= Mljet National Park =

National park in Croatia

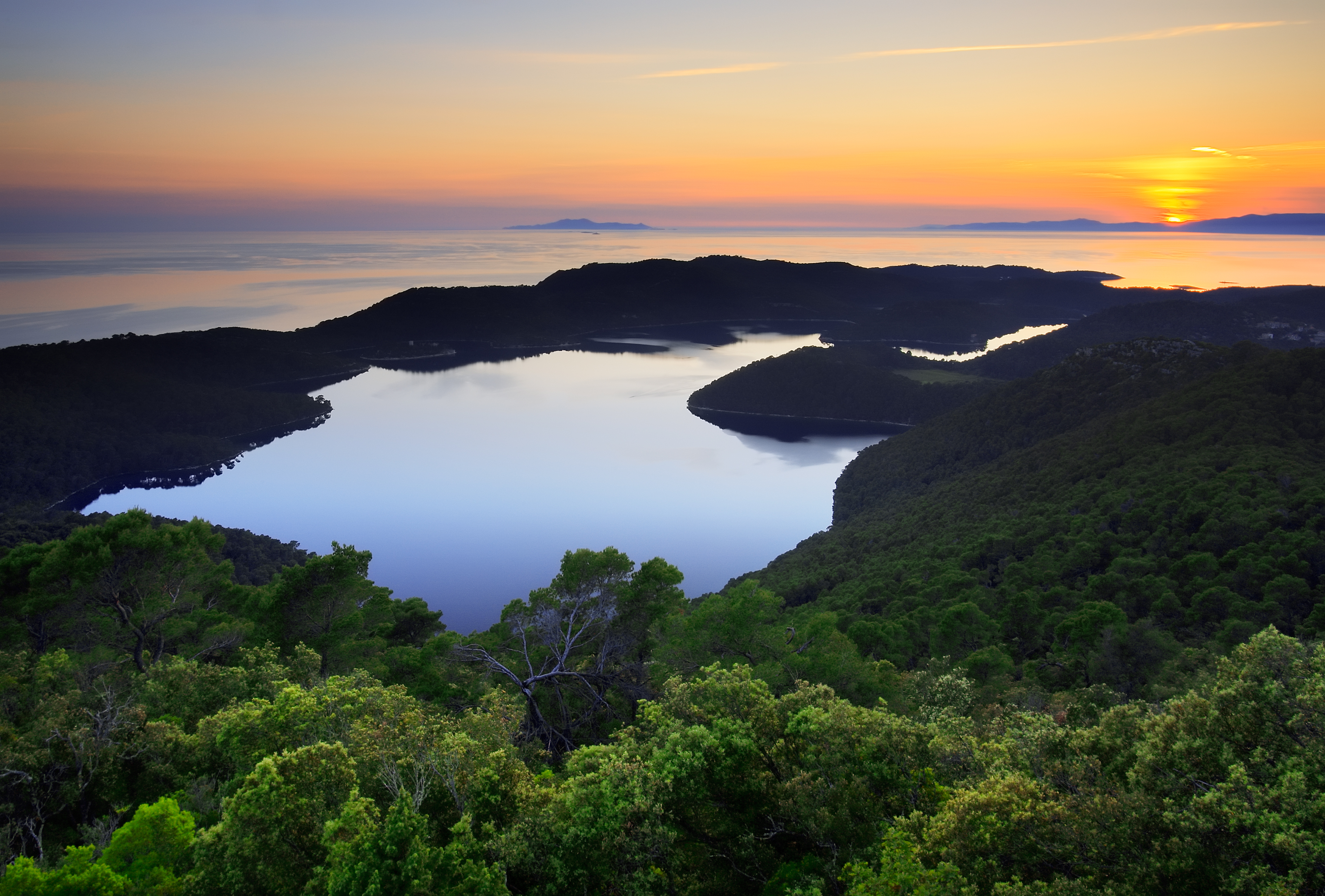
- A sunset over the lakes in the national park

- Location within Croatia
- Interactive map of Mljet National Park
- Coordinates: 42°46′42″N 17°22′5″E
- Area: 5,300 ha (20 sq mi)
- Designation: National Park
- Designated: November 11, 1960
- Website: https://np-mljet.hr/

The Mljet National Park is a national park that covers the western part of the Adriatic island of Mljet, in the south of Croatia.

Its area includes the western part of the island, Veliko jezero, Malo jezero, Soline Bay and a sea belt 500 metres wide from the most prominent cape of Mljet covering an area of almost 5,300 ha (53 km^{2}).

The central parts of the park are Veliko jezero with the Isle of St. Mary, Malo jezero and the villages of Goveđari, Polače, and Pomena.

The Park was first proclaimed on November 11, 1960.
