= Korita, Dubrovnik-Neretva County =

Korita
- Village
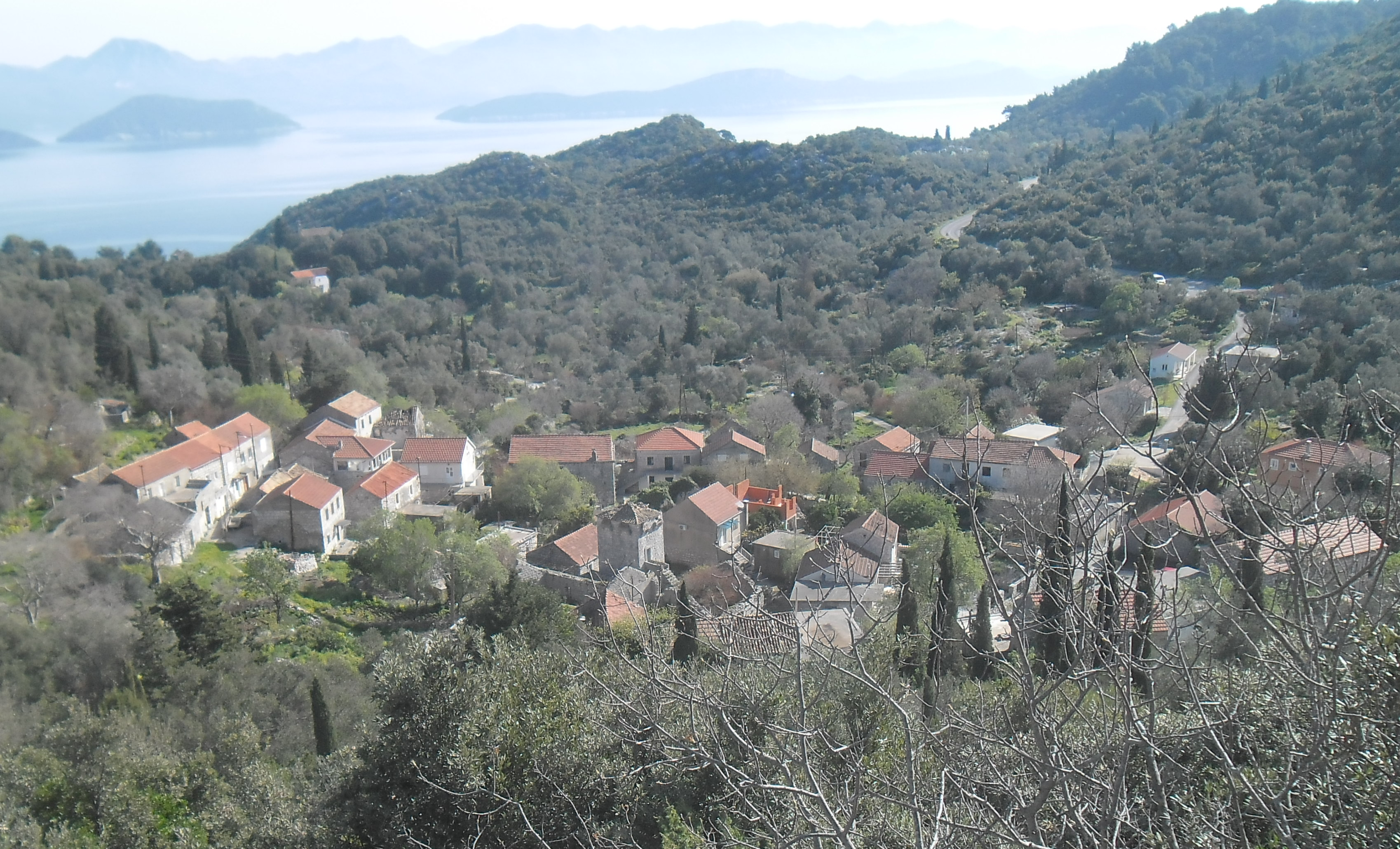
- Interactive map of Korita
- Location of Korita in Croatia
- Coordinates: 42.7087036°N 17.6943271°E
- Country: Croatia
- County: Dubrovnik-Neretva County
- Municipality: Mljet

Area
  - Total: 3.4 sq mi (8.7 km^{2})

Population (2021)
  - Total: 52
  - Density: 15/sq mi (6.0/km^{2})
- Time zone: UTC+1 (CET)
  - Summer (DST): UTC+2 (CEST)
- Postal code: 20225 Babino Polje
- Area code: +385 (0)20

Korita is an inland village on the island of Mljet in southern Croatia. In 2021, its population was 52.

== Name ==
The village gets its name from natural stone hollows (korito: a trough) that would fill with water during rainy periods.

== History ==
Due to its geographical placement, Korita held strategic value for observing the Mljet Channel and the adjacent open sea. Throughout history, Korita was one of the larger settlements on the island.

The village of Korita came into existence during the 15th century, following the destruction of Okuklje and people moving from Žara.

A tower that stands in the middle of the village was originally built to defend against pirate attacks. Throughout the 17th and 18th centuries, the residents focused on fishing, particularly catching and selling salted sardines, which brought considerable wealth to the area. During this time, nobles from Dubrovnik, Ston, and other regions settled in Korita, giving it the characteristics of a more urban settlement.

The sudden vanishing of sardines late in the 18th century caused Korita to fall into poverty. This led to many people leaving the village, and a subsequent plague caused many deaths.

The long-term settlement of the town, as well as the island, is evidenced by the excavations of the church of St. Paul from the 5th century and the remains of a villa rustica from the 1st century.

== Demographics ==
Village of Korita: Population trends 1857–2021
v

| population | 135 | 128 | 141 | 135 | 120 | 153 | 132 | 141 | 163 | 164 | 186 | 168 | 115 | 90 | 74 | 46 | 52 |
| | 1857 | 1869 | 1880 | 1890 | 1900 | 1910 | 1921 | 1931 | 1948 | 1953 | 1961 | 1971 | 1981 | 1991 | 2001 | 2011 | 2021 |

Sources: Croatian Bureau of Statistics publications

== Landmarks ==
Korita features several historical churches:

St. Vid Chapel
a 16th century church with the village cemetery
Gospa od Brijega
a church dating back to the 14th century (an old local cemetery is nearby, and it's thought that a larger settlement called Seoce existed here in the 14th and 15th centuries)
St. Ilija (Elias) Chapel
a church from the 16th century. St. Elias is the local patron saint, whose feast is observed in Korita on July 20th
Church of St. Mark
St. Clare's house

== Gallery ==
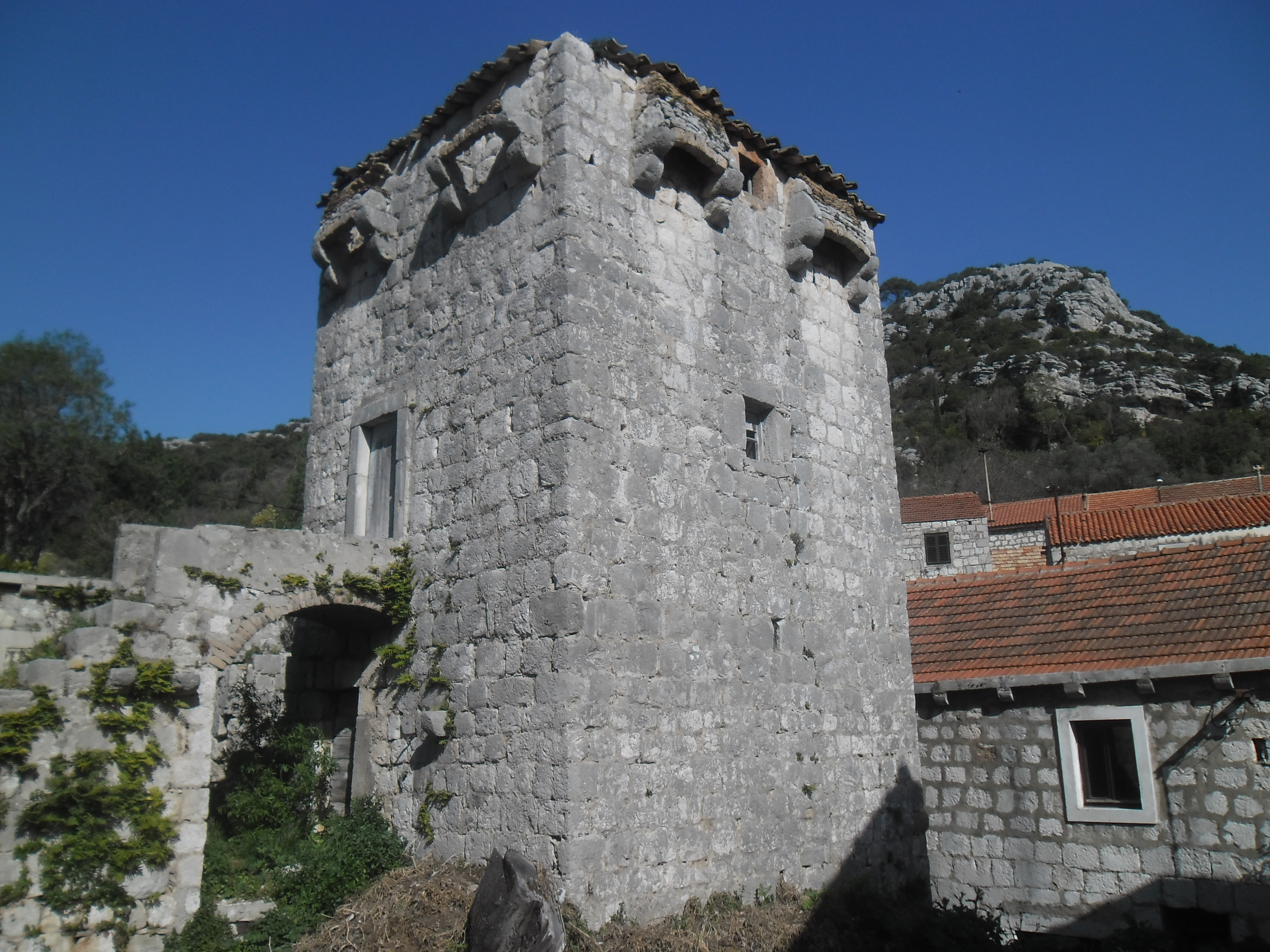
Tower

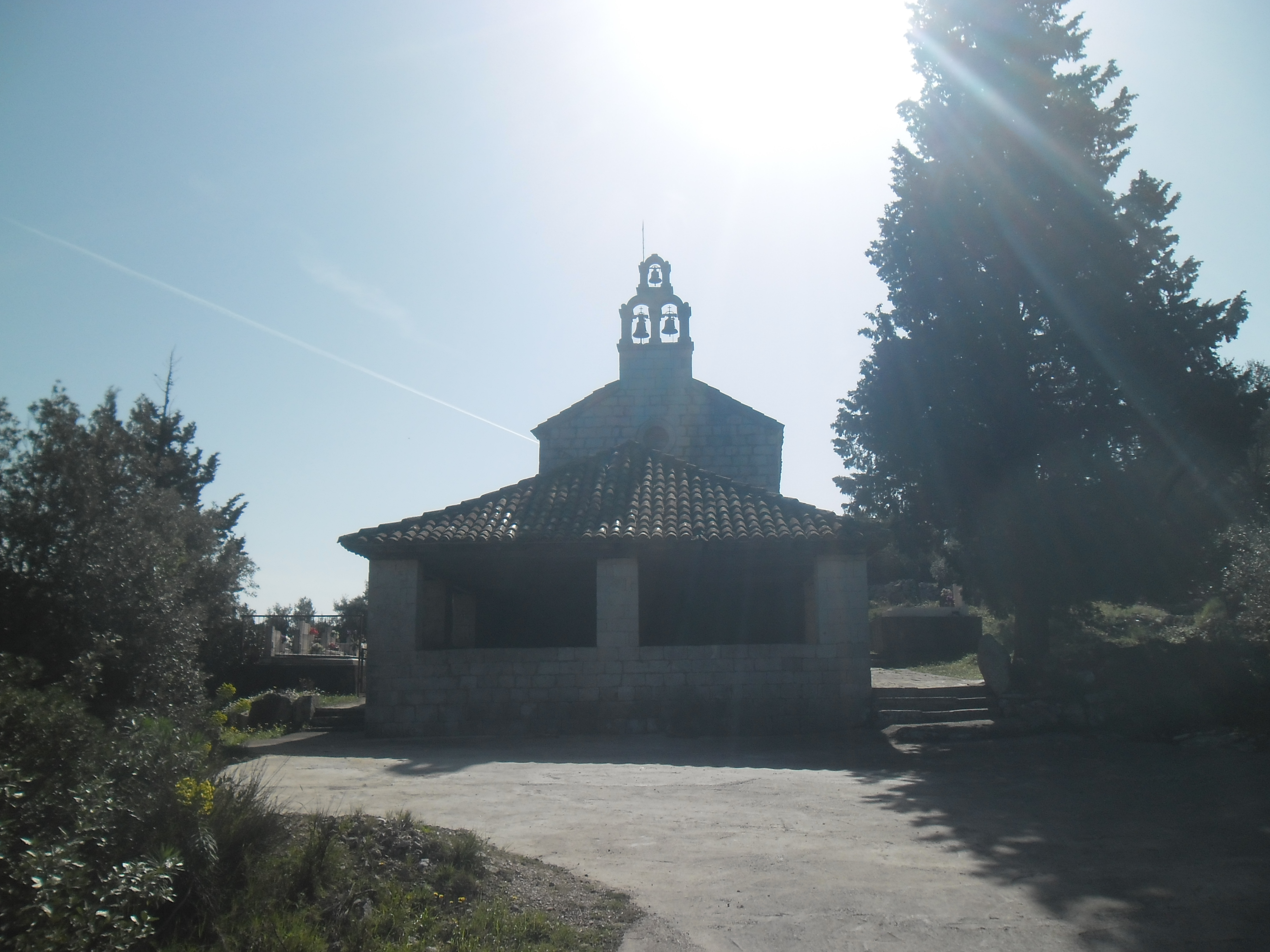
St. Vid Chapel

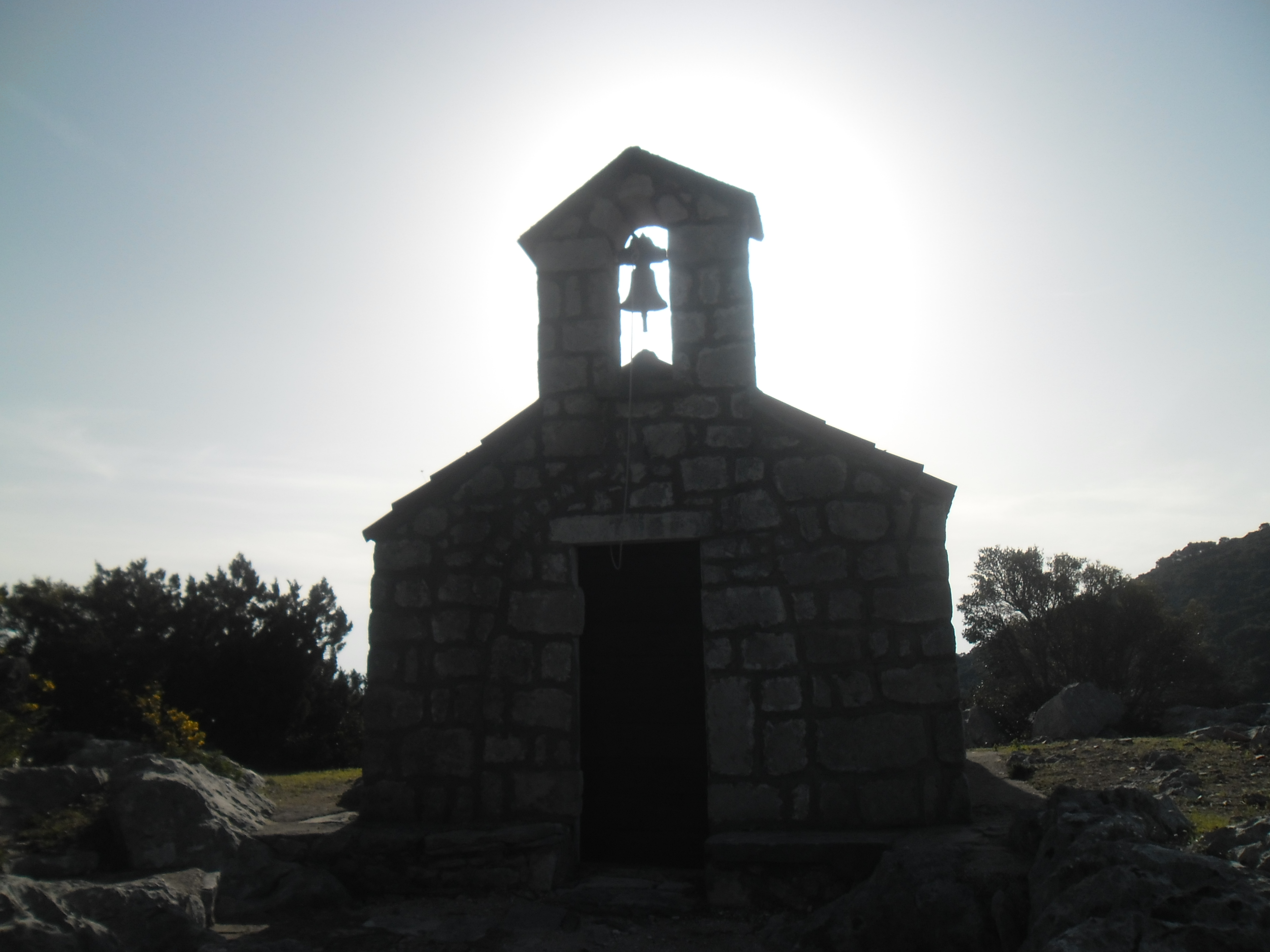
Gospa od Brijega Church

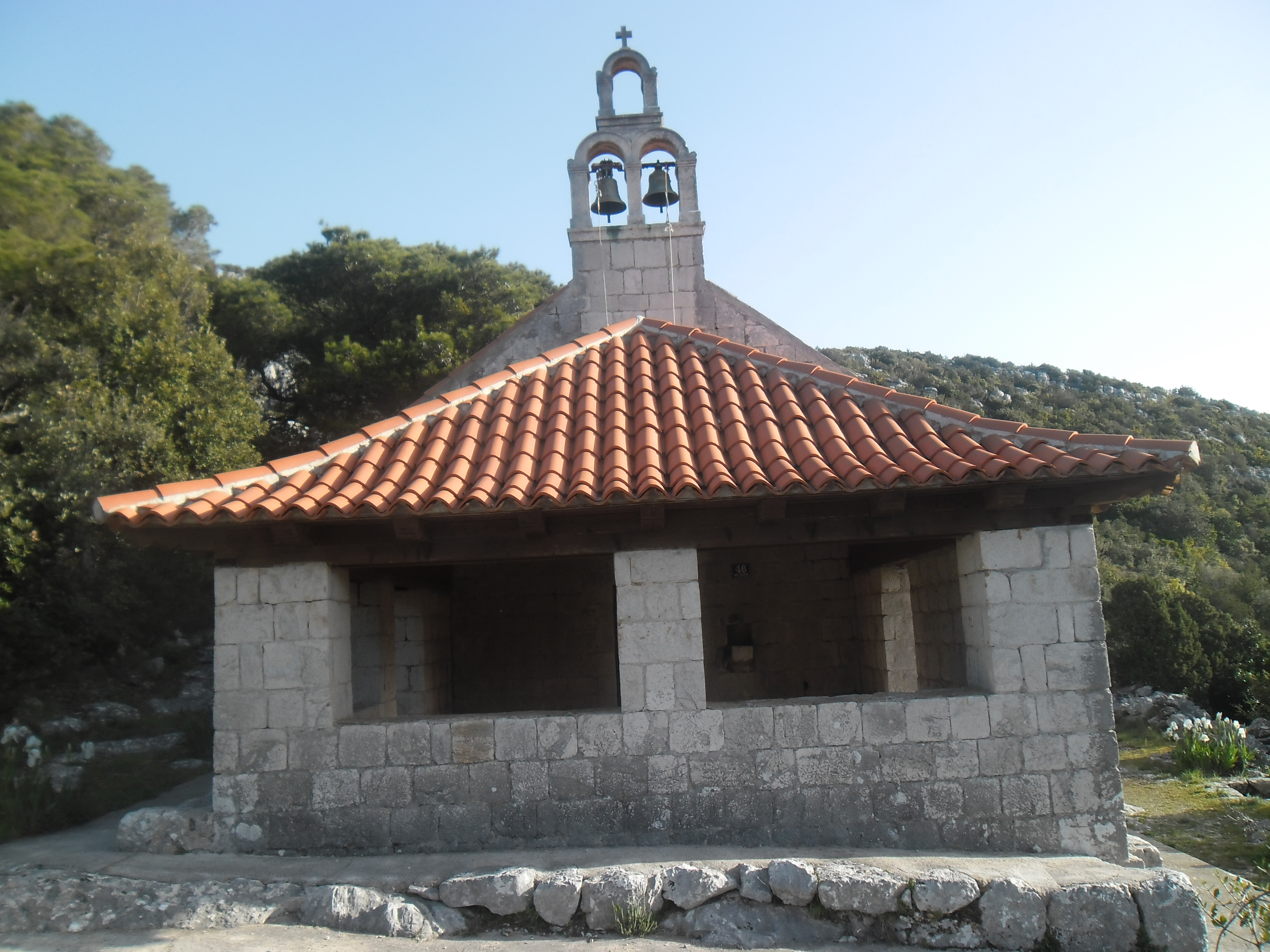
St. Ilija Chapel
