= Fusinus buzzurroi =

Scientific classification
- Kingdom: Animalia
- Phylum: Mollusca
- Class: Gastropoda
- Subclass: Caenogastropoda
- Order: Neogastropoda
- Family: Fasciolariidae
- Genus: Fusinus
- Species: F. buzzurroi

Binomial name
- Fusinus buzzurroi Prkić & Russo, 2008

Species of gastropod

Fusinus buzzurroi is a species of sea snail, a marine gastropod mollusc in the family Fasciolariidae.

The type locality is Mljet Island, Croatia.
