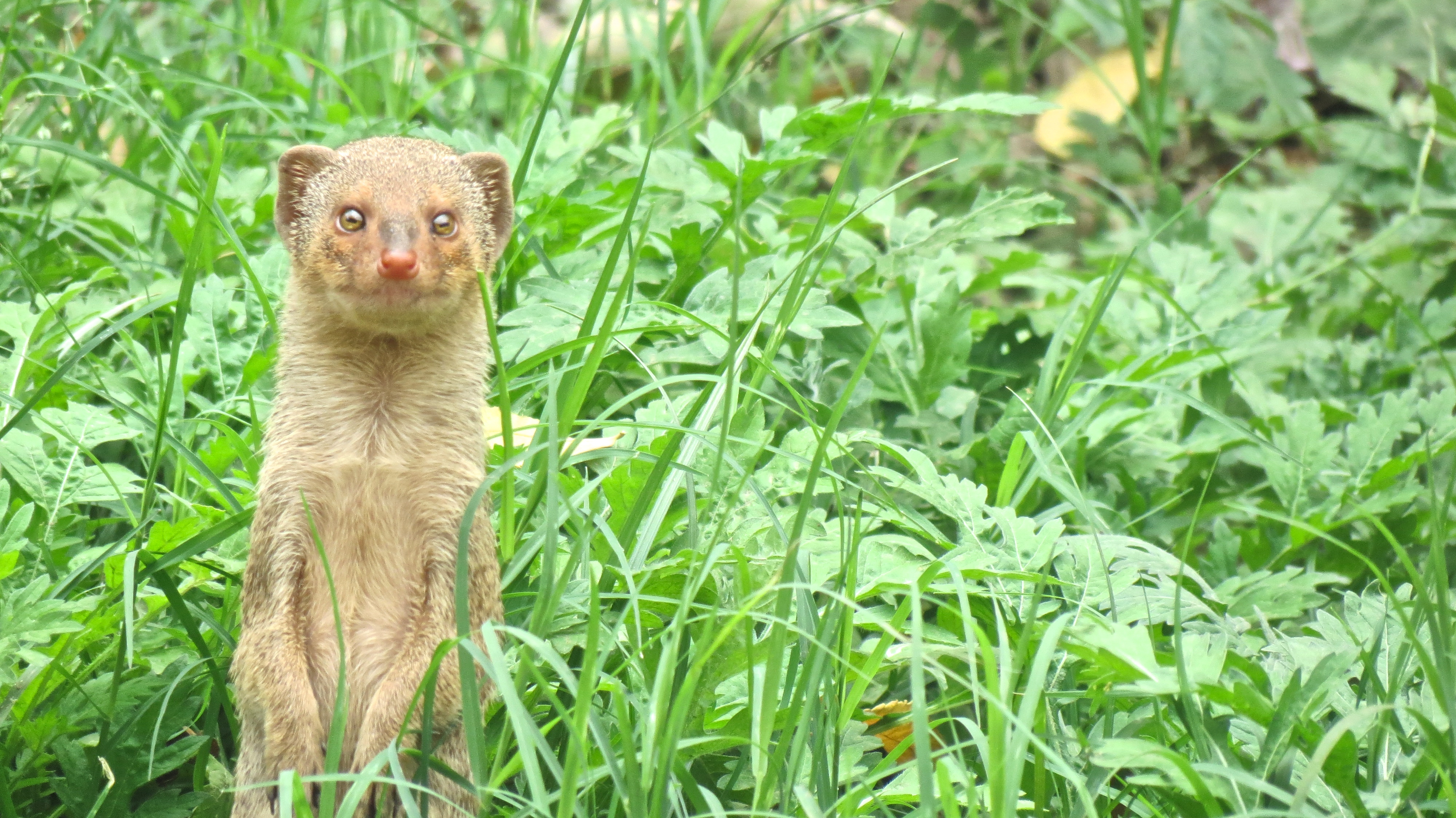
- Small Indian mongoose in Panna National Park

Conservation status
- Least Concern (IUCN 3.1)

Scientific classification
- Kingdom: Animalia
- Phylum: Chordata
- Class: Mammalia
- Order: Carnivora
- Family: Herpestidae
- Genus: Urva
- Species: U. auropunctata

Binomial name
- Urva auropunctata (Hodgson, 1836)
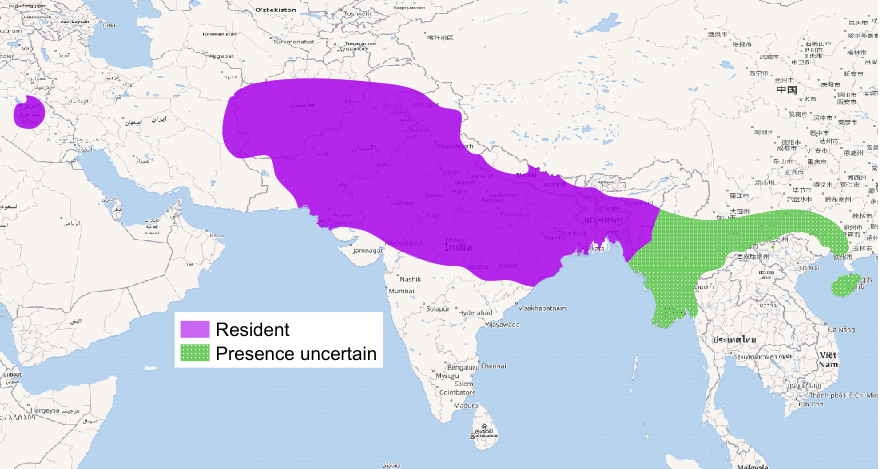
- Native distribution of the small Indian mongoose in 2016

Synonyms
- Mangusta auropunctata Mangusta pallipes Herpestes palustris Herpestes auropunctatus

= Small Indian mongoose =

Species of carnivoran in South Asia

The small Indian mongoose (Urva auropunctata) is a mongoose species native to Iraq and northern India; it has also been introduced to several Caribbean and Pacific islands.

== Taxonomy ==
Mangusta auropunctata was the scientific name proposed by Brian Houghton Hodgson in 1836 for a mongoose specimen collected in central Nepal. In the 19th and 20th centuries, several zoological specimens were described:

- Mangusta pallipes proposed by Edward Blyth in 1845 was based on mongooses observed in Kandahar, Afghanistan.
- Herpestes palustris proposed by R. K. Ghose in 1965 was an adult male mongoose collected in a swamp on the eastern fringe of Kolkata, India.

The small Indian mongoose was later classified in the genus Herpestes; all Asian mongooses are now classified the genus Urva.

The small Indian mongoose was once considered a subspecies of the Javan mongoose (H. javanicus). Genetic analysis of hair and tissue samples from 18 small Indian and Javan mongooses revealed that they form two clades and are distinct species.

== Description ==
The small Indian mongoose's body is slender, and the head is elongated with a pointed snout. The length of the head and body is 509–671 mm (20.0–26.4 in). The ears are short. The feet have five toes and long claws. Sexes differ in size, with males having a wider head and bigger bodies.

It can be distinguished from the often sympatric Indian grey mongoose (U. edwardsii) by its somewhat smaller size. Populations on islands throughout the world have increased in size and sexual dimorphism, resembling populations in the east of their range, where they have no ecological competitors. Introduced populations show genetic diversification due to genetic drift and isolation.

== Distribution and habitat ==
The small Indian mongoose is distributed in Iraq through southeastern Iran, Afghanistan, Pakistan, India, Nepal, Bhutan, Bangladesh and Myanmar. It has been introduced to several European countries, islands in the Caribbean Sea, Indian and Pacific Oceans, and on Okinawa in southern Japan. It lives at elevations of up to 2,100 m (6,900 ft).

In Iraq, the small Indian mongoose lives in the alluvial plains of the Tigris–Euphrates river system, where it inhabits riverine thickets, crop fields and orchards. It was also observed in the Hammar Marshes.

In Iran, it was recorded only in a few localities in the south and east, in particular in Kerman Province.

In Pakistan, it occurs on the Pothohar Plateau, in Sialkot District, southeastern Azad Jammu and Kashmir and in Margalla Hills National Park. In India, it was observed in forested areas of Madhya Pradesh, in Panna Tiger Reserve, Guna district, and in Gandhi Sagar Sanctuary.

In 2016, the European Commission added the small Indian mongoose to the annual list of invasive and alien species.

=== Introduction to Caribbean ===
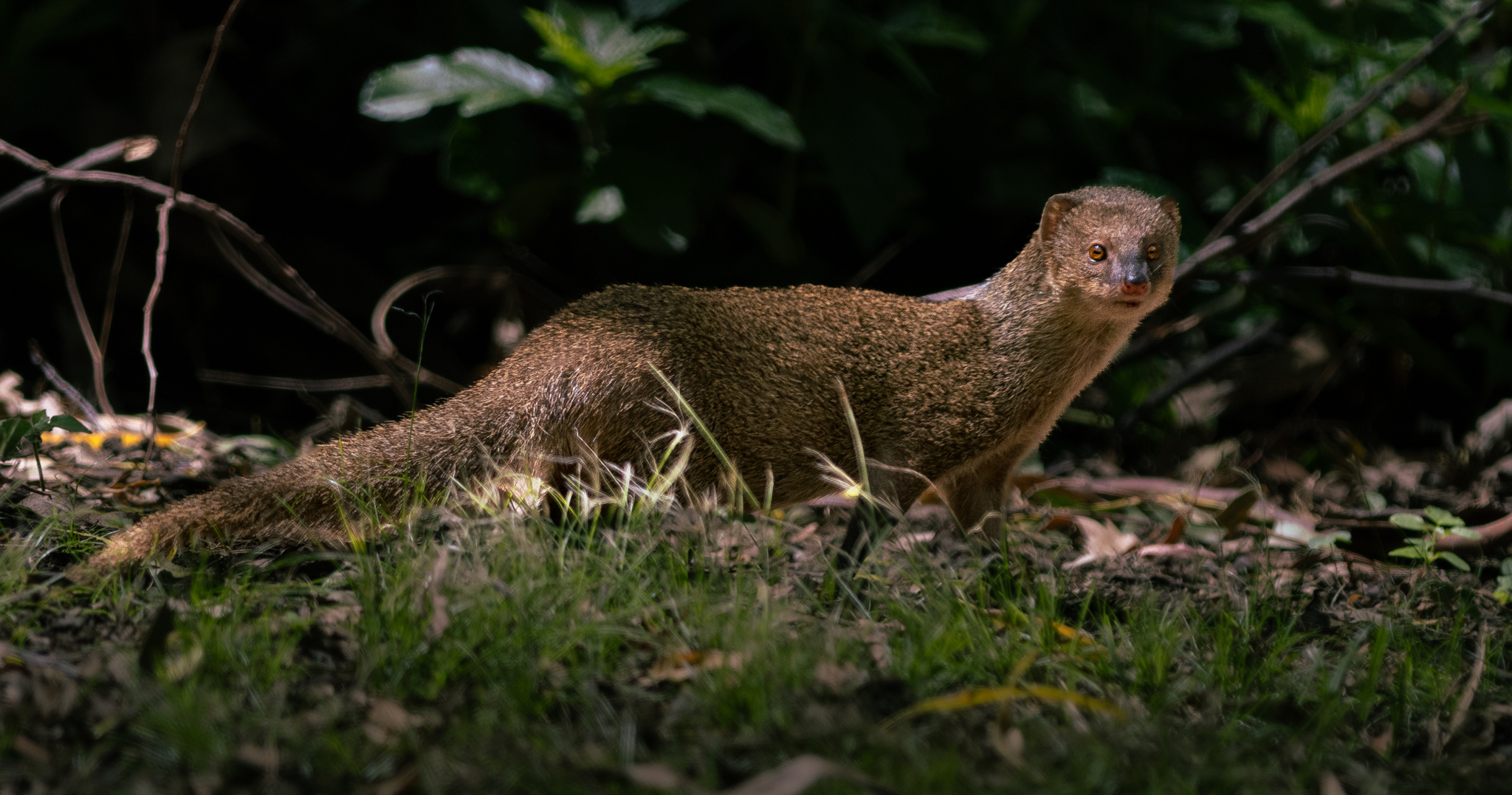
Small Indian Mongoose photographed in Hawaiʻi

In 1872, nine small Indian mongooses were introduced to Jamaica from India to control black (Rattus rattus) and brown rats (R. norvegicus) on sugarcane plantations. They reproduced within a few months. In the 1800s, sugarcane plantations were established on many Pacific islands such as Hawaii and Fiji. Sugarcane attracted rats, which caused widespread crop failure and loss. Attempts to introduce the small Indian mongoose on Trinidad in 1870 for the purpose of rat control were not successful. From 1870 onwards, it was introduced to all of the Greater Antilles islands including Cuba, Hispaniola, Jamaica, Puerto Rico, Saint Croix, U.S. Virgin Islands to reduce crop damage. This introduction had a negative impact on the native fauna, as populations of endemic reptiles greatly decreased in number like the green iguana (Iguana iguana); the ground lizard (Ameiva polops) had been eliminated from the island of St. Croix by 1962. Ground-nesting birds, terrestrial rock iguanas and small mammals like hutias and solenodons were likely also affected. Native snakes have been largely extirpated on many of the Caribbean islands where mongooses were introduced, and now only exist on remote offshore islands; at least one snake species in St. Croix may now be extinct.

=== Introduction to Hawaii ===
Small Indian mongoose in Hawaii

Offspring from Jamaican small Indian mongooses were shipped to plantations on other islands. Early 1900s accounts claimed that introduced mongooses were effective at reducing the number of rats, mice and insects. However, the mongooses also preyed on native birds that had evolved in the absence of any mammalian predators. The mongooses also raided the nests of green sea turtles to consume eggs and turtle hatchlings.

=== Introduction to Okinawa ===
The small Indian mongoose was introduced to Okinawa Island in 1910 and also to Amami Ōshima Island in 1979 in an attempt to control the venomous pit viper Protobothrops flavoviridis and other perceived 'pests'; the mongoose has since become a pest itself.

On September 3, 2024, the Ministry of the Environment announced that the small Indian mongoose had been eradicated from Amami Ōshima.

=== Introduction to Dalmatian islands ===
The small Indian mongoose was introduced to the Mljet island in 1910 by order of the Austro-Hungarian Ministry of Agriculture in an attempt to control the horned viper (Vipera ammodytes) population. After quarantine, seven males and four females, were released near Goveđari and introduced to Korčula, Pelješac, Brač and Šolta between 1921 and 1927, the population of the horned viper decreased significantly in 20 years and the mongooses started preying more on resident and migratory birds, and also on domestic poultry. Around 1970, the mongoose inhabited Hvar and spread rapidly. It did not survive on Brač and Šolta, but it did appear on Čiovo. The mongoose is considered vermin, but neither the bounties offered nor the introduction of wild boars to the island helped to reduce the population.

== Behaviour and ecology ==
The small Indian mongoose uses about 12 different vocalizations.

=== Diet ===
In Pakistan, the small Indian mongoose feeds primarily on insects including dragonflies, grasshoppers, mole crickets, ground beetles, earwigs and ants. It also preys on lesser bandicoot rat (Bandicota bengalensis), short-tailed bandicoot rat (Nesokia indica), Asian house shrew (Suncus murinus), Indian gerbil (Tatera indica) and house mouse (Mus musculus). Scat collected in Pir Lasura National Park contained remains of black rat (Rattus rattus), small amphibians, reptiles, small birds, seeds of grasses and fruits. Faecal pellets found near burrows in Gujarat contained fish scales, feathers and remains of insects in December and plant matter also in spring.

=== Diseases ===
Small Indian mongooses in northern Okinawa Island were infected with Leptospira and antibiotic-resistant strains of Escherichia coli. The small Indian mongoose is a major rabies vector in Puerto Rico, but transmission to humans is low.
