= Babino Polje =

- Village
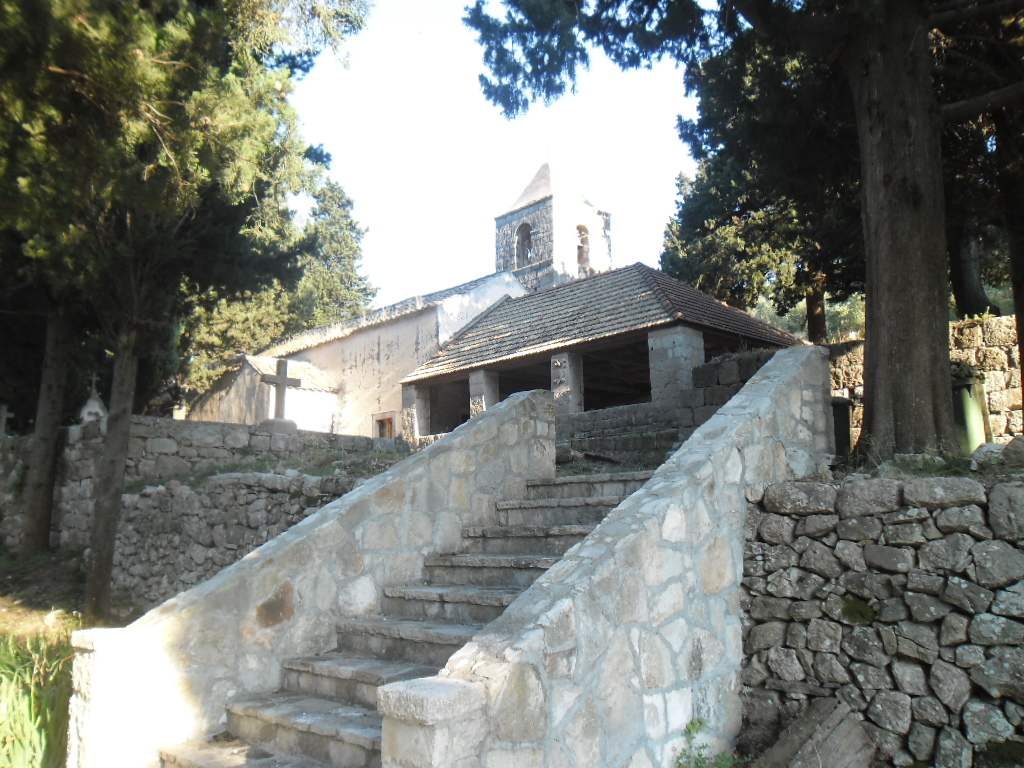

- Location within Croatia
- Coordinates: 42°44′08″N 17°33′03″E
- Country: Croatia
- County: Dubrovnik-Neretva County
- Municipality: Mljet

Area
  - Total: 10.5 sq mi (27.2 km^{2})

Population (2021)
  - Total: 262
  - Density: 24.9/sq mi (9.63/km^{2})
- Time zone: UTC+1 (CET)
  - Summer (DST): UTC+2 (CEST)
- Postal code: 20225 Babino Polje

Babino Polje is a village in Dalmatia, southern Croatia. With a population of 262, it is the largest settlement on the island of Mljet and is connected by the D120 state road.

== Demographics ==
According to the 2021 census, its population was 262. It had 270 in 2011.

== Gallery ==
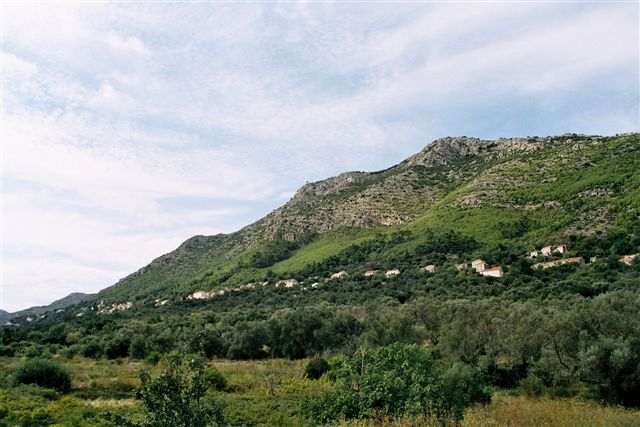

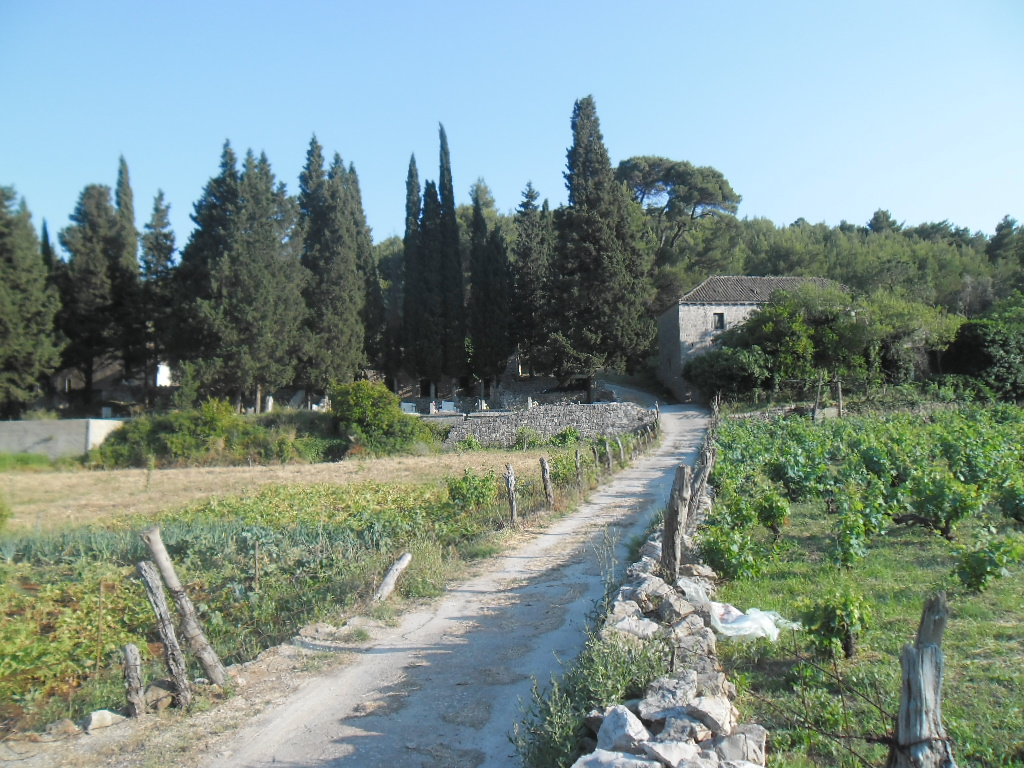

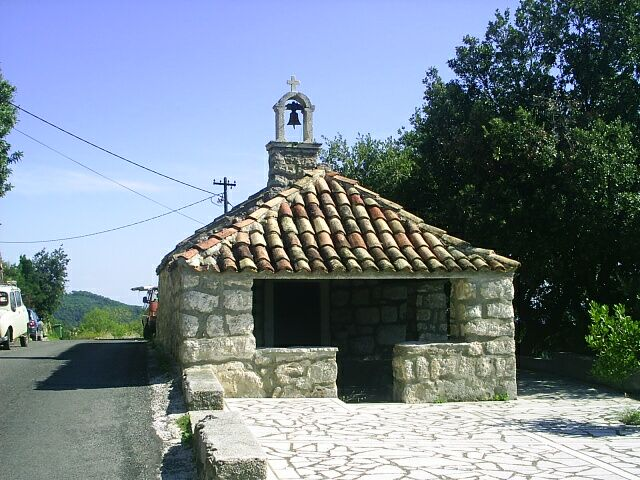

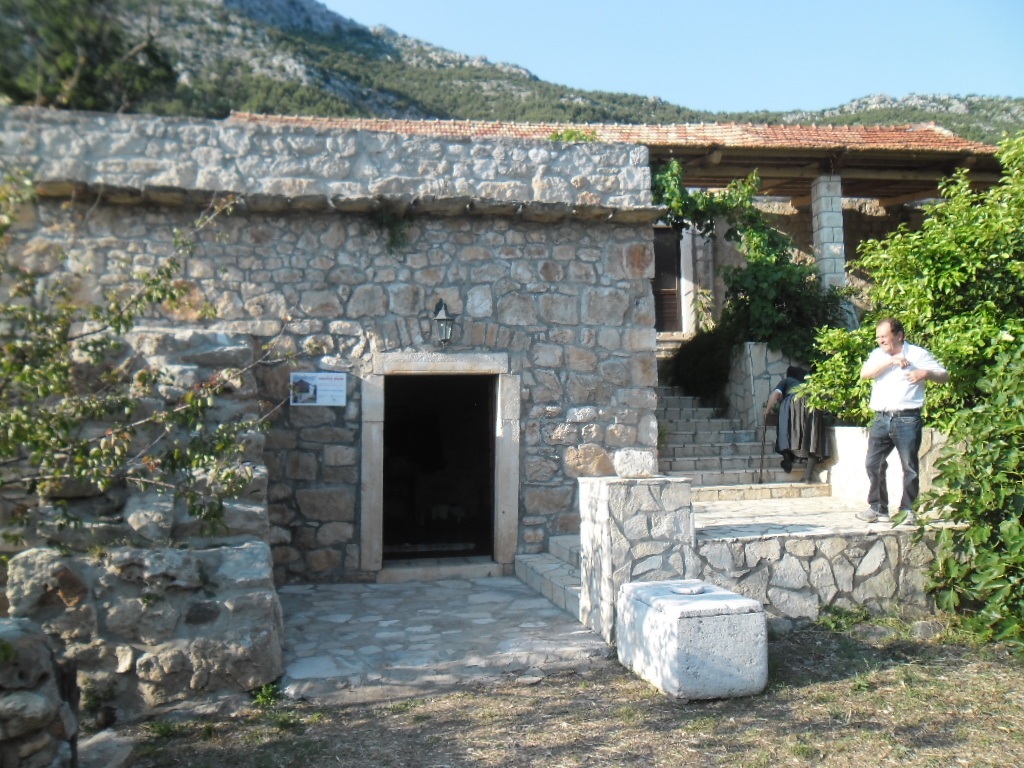

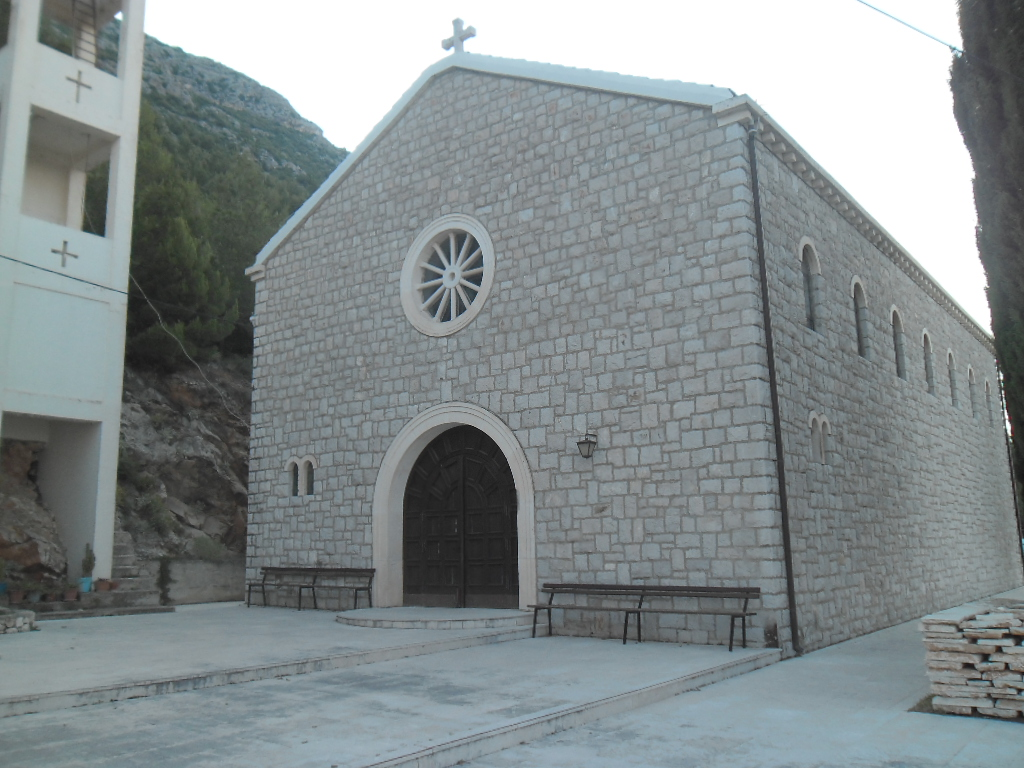

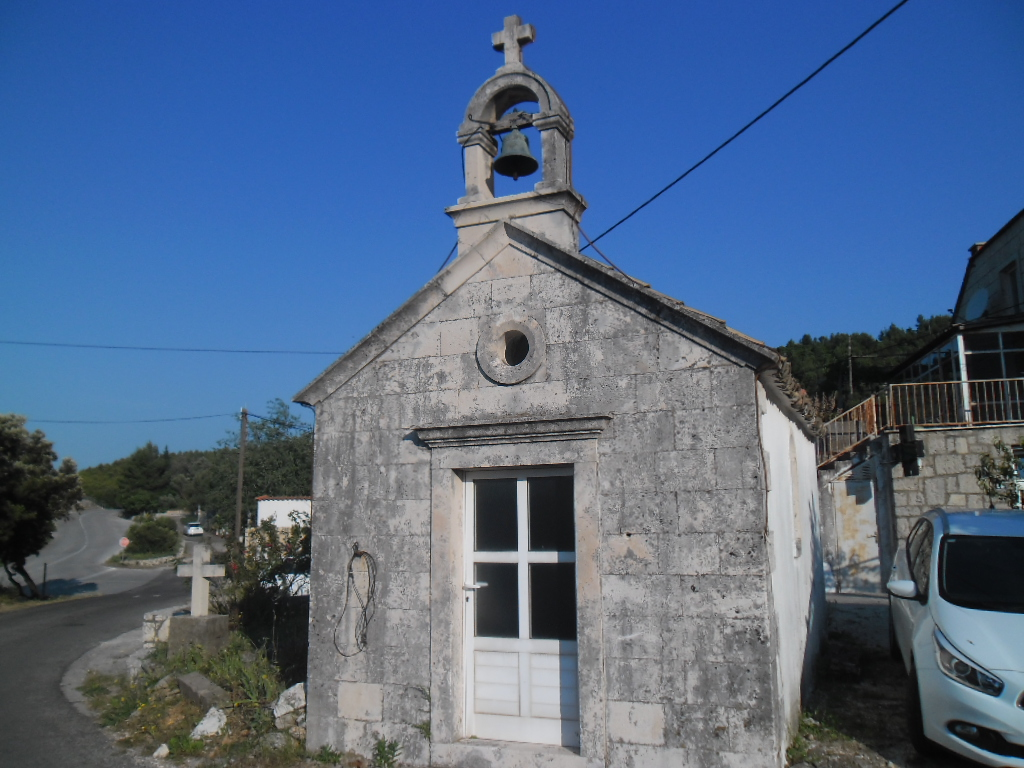

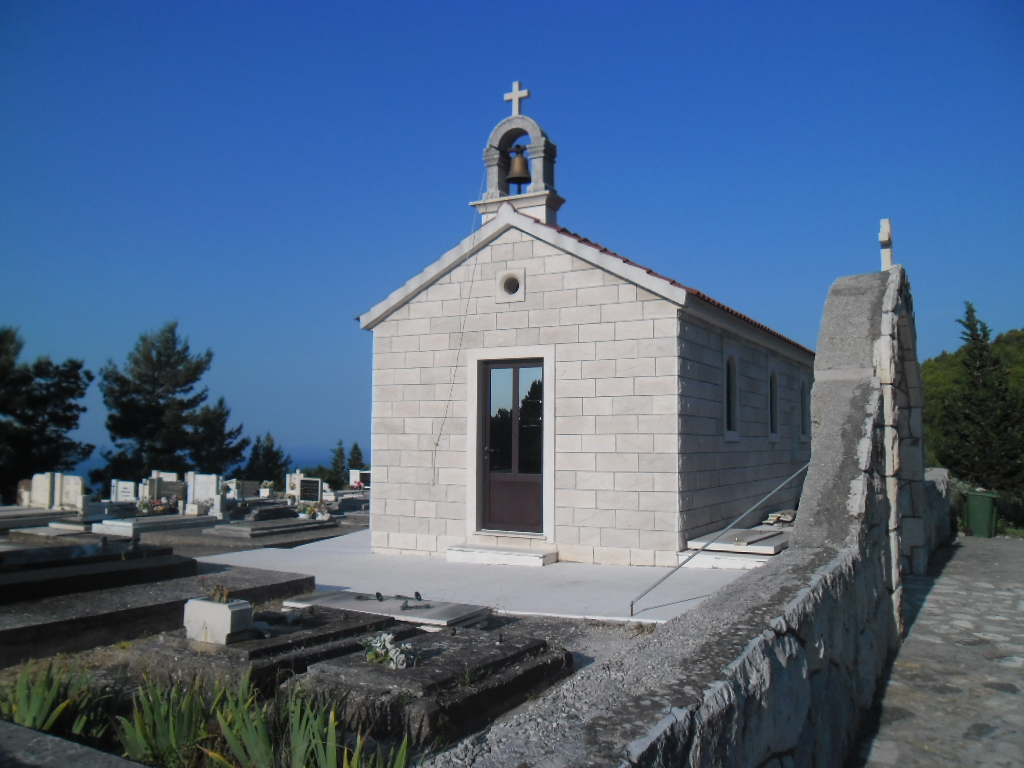

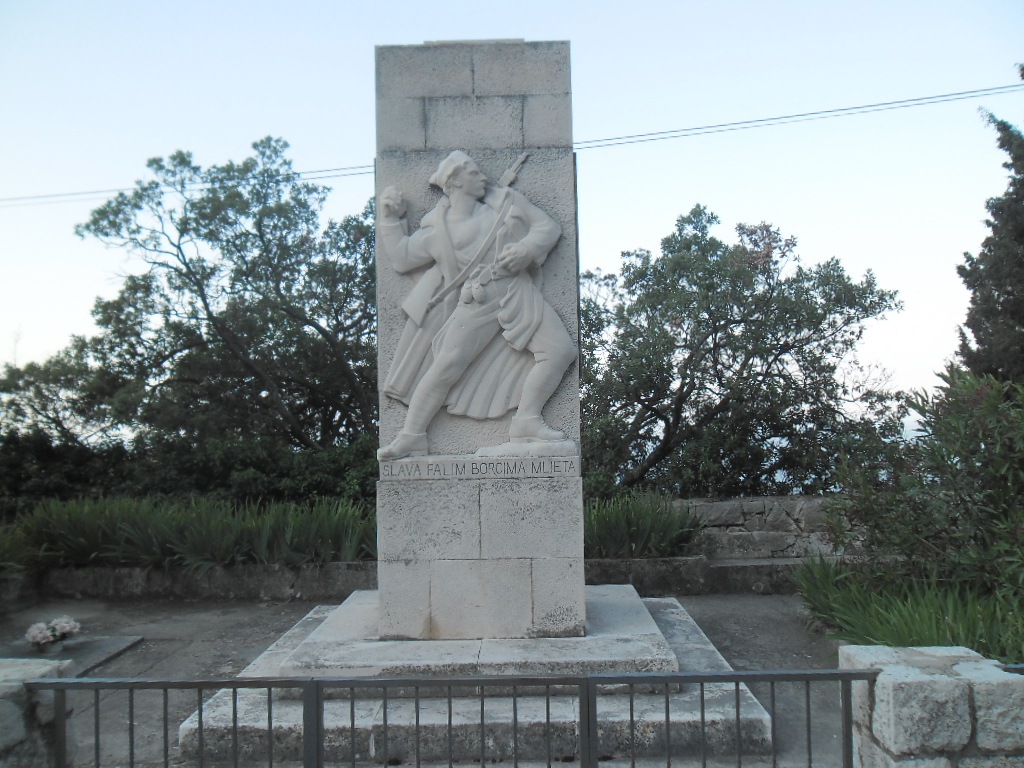
