= Prožurska Luka =

- Village
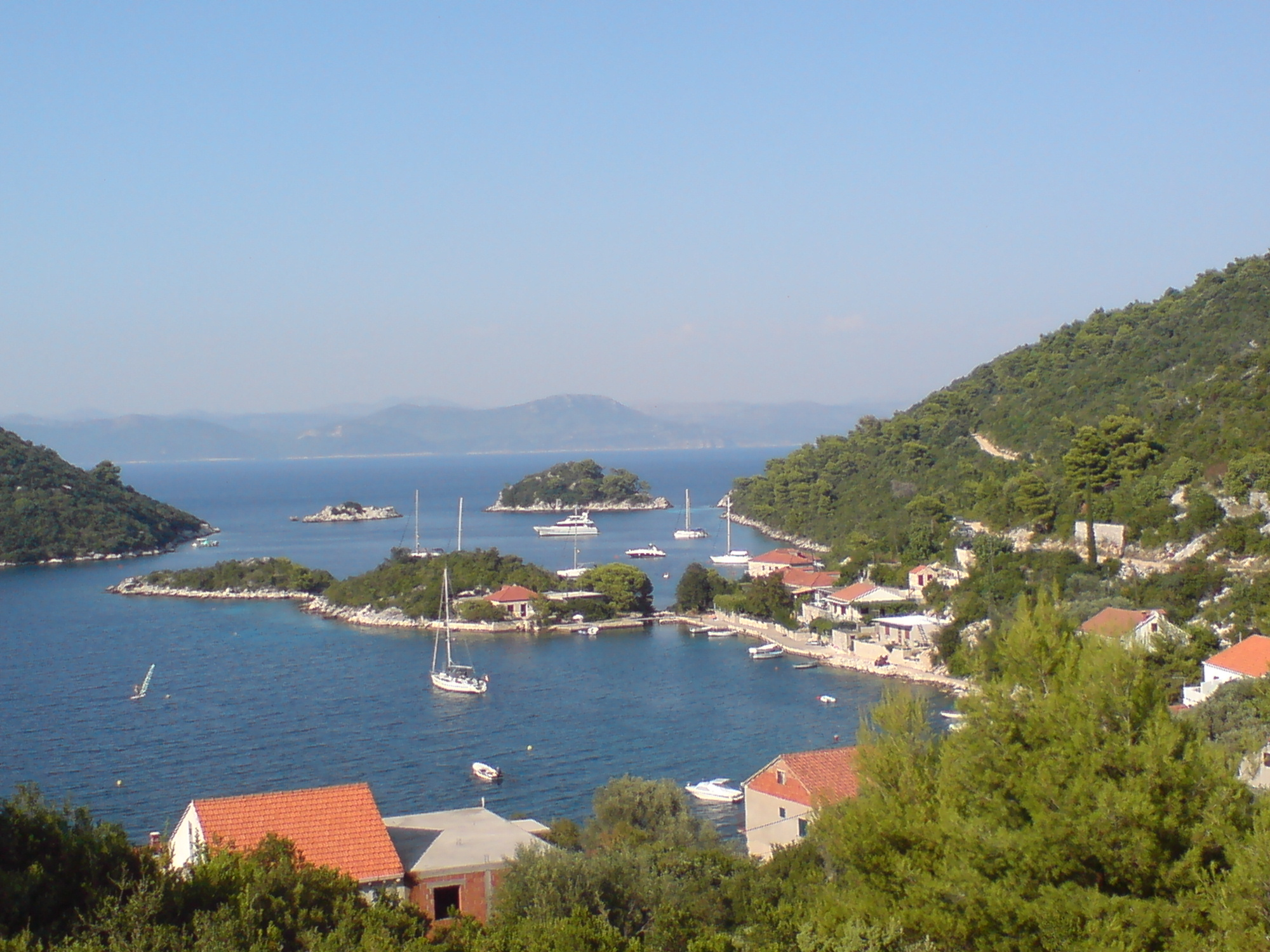

- Location within Croatia
- Coordinates: 42.7317595°N 17.6428286°E
- Country: Croatia
- County: Dubrovnik-Neretva County
- Municipality: Mljet

Area
  - Total: 0.50 sq mi (1.3 km^{2})

Population (2021)
  - Total: 48
  - Density: 96/sq mi (37/km^{2})
- Time zone: UTC+1 (CET)
  - Summer (DST): UTC+2 (CEST)

Prožurska Luka is a village on the island of Mljet in southern Croatia.

== Demographics ==
According to the 2021 census, its population was 48.
