= Blato, Mljet =

Blato
- Village
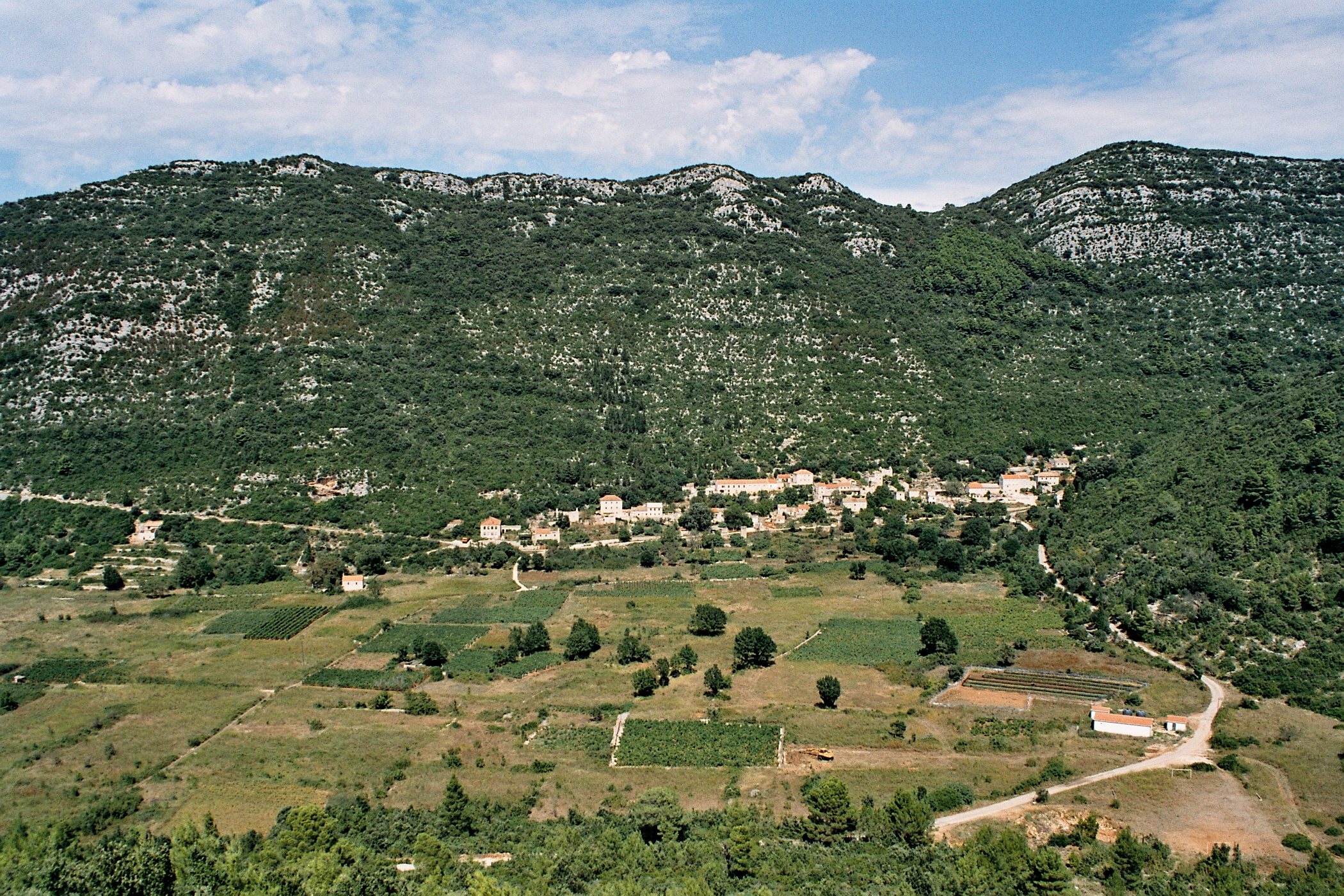

- Location within Croatia
- Coordinates: 42°45′45″N 17°28′53″E
- Country: Croatia
- County: Dubrovnik-Neretva County
- Municipality: Mljet

Area
  - Total: 3.3 sq mi (8.6 km^{2})

Population (2021)
  - Total: 31
  - Density: 9.3/sq mi (3.6/km^{2})
- Time zone: UTC+1 (CET)
  - Summer (DST): UTC+2 (CEST)
- Postal code: 20225 Babino Polje

Blato is a village on the island of Mljet in southern Croatia.

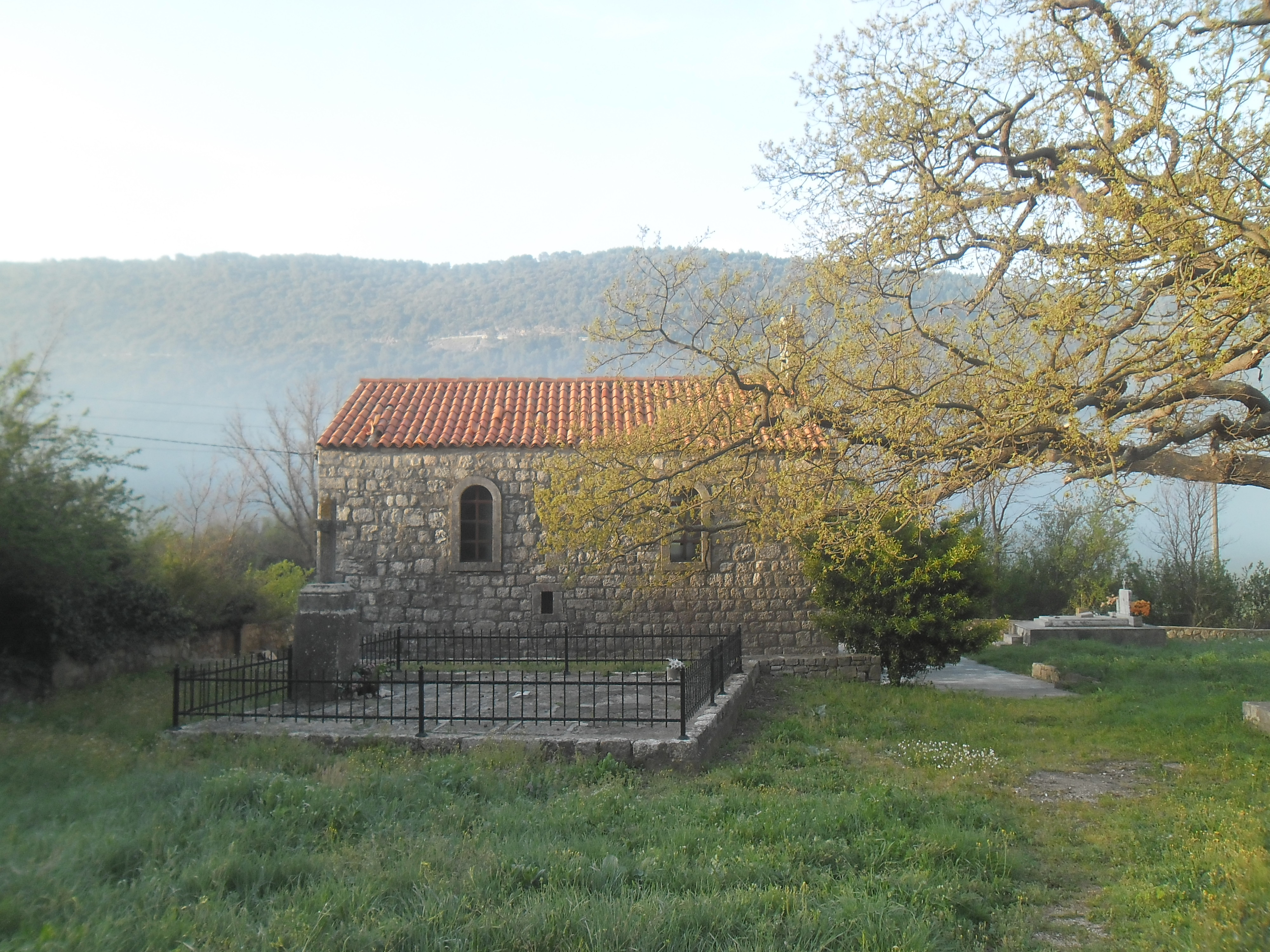
St. Peter and Paul's Church

== Demographics ==
According to the 2021 census, its population was 31. It had 46 in 2001.
