= Ropa, Croatia =

Ropa
- Village
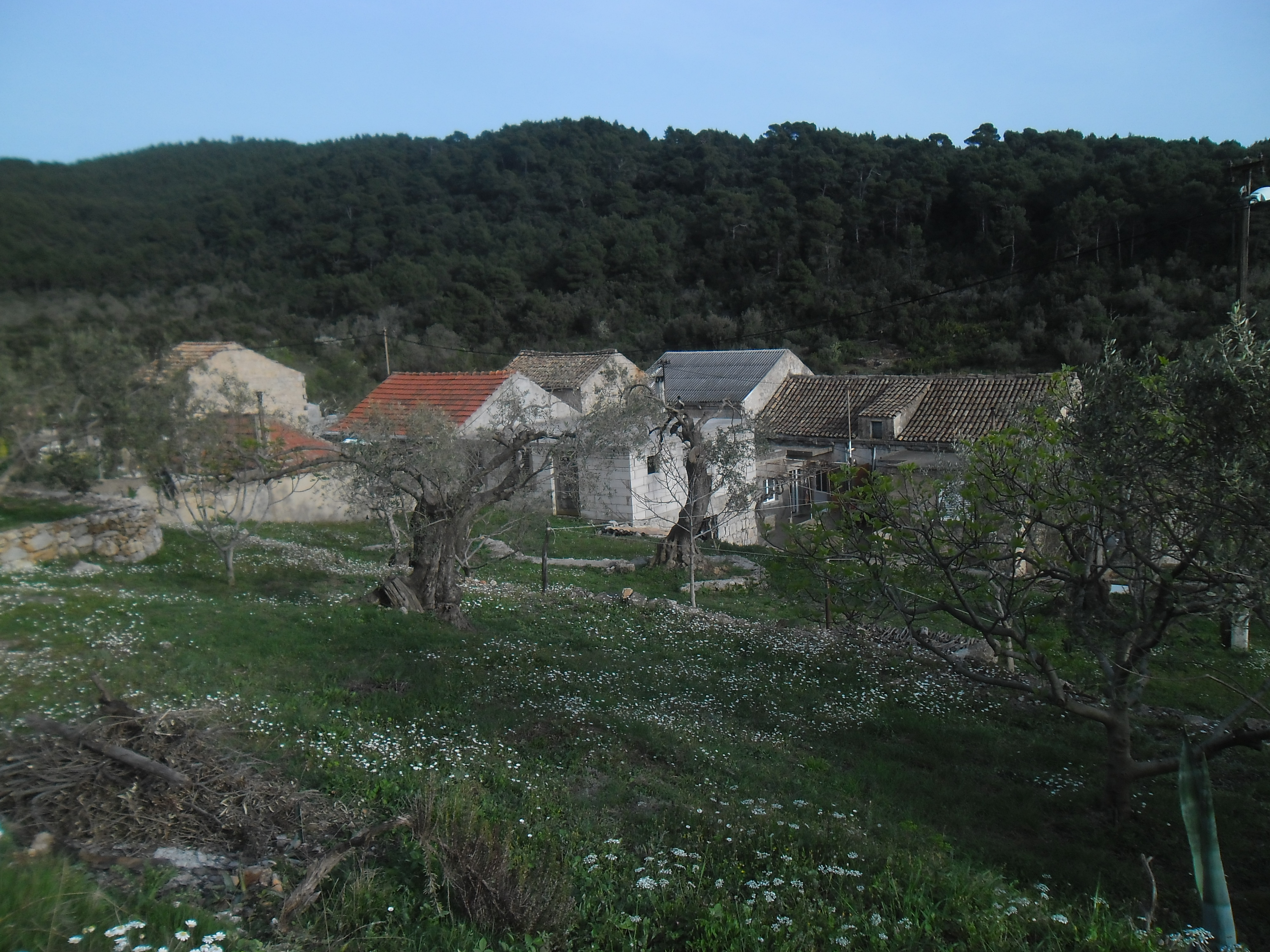

- Location within Croatia
- Coordinates: 42.7516615°N 17.4441593°E
- Country: Croatia
- County: Dubrovnik-Neretva County
- Municipality: Mljet

Area
  - Total: 1.4 sq mi (3.5 km^{2})

Population (2021)
  - Total: 23
  - Density: 17/sq mi (6.6/km^{2})
- Time zone: UTC+1 (CET)
  - Summer (DST): UTC+2 (CEST)

Ropa is a village on the island of Mljet in southern Croatia.

== Demographics ==
According to the 2021 census, its population was 23.
