= Maranovići =

- Village
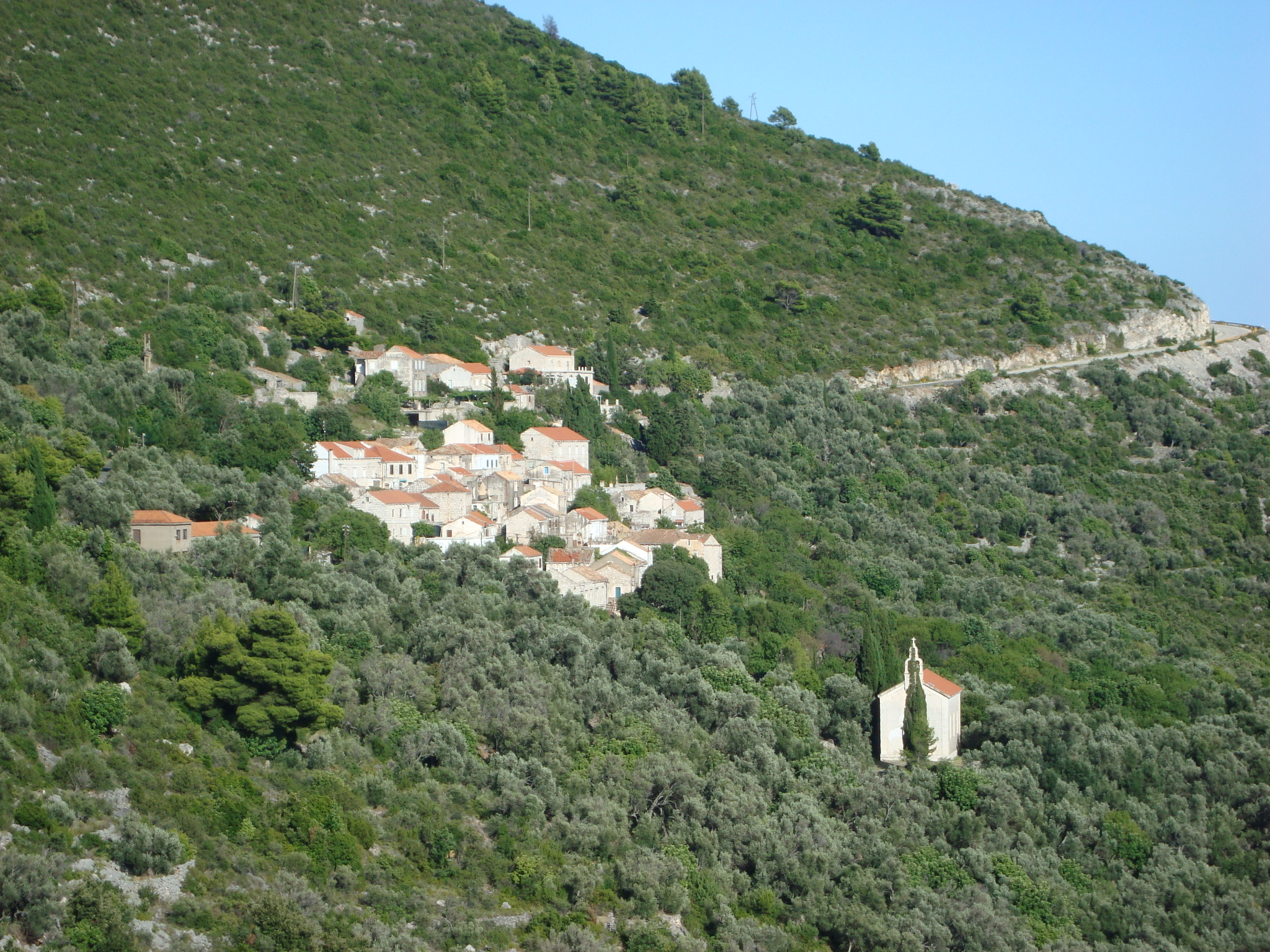

- Location within Croatia
- Country: Croatia
- County: Dubrovnik-Neretva County
- Municipality: Mljet

Area
  - Total: 1.5 sq mi (4.0 km^{2})

Population (2021)
  - Total: 29
  - Density: 19/sq mi (7.2/km^{2})
- Time zone: UTC+1 (CET)
  - Summer (DST): UTC+2 (CEST)

Maranovići is one of the oldest villages on Mljet in Croatia. The place is located on eastern part of the D120 highway that runs through the whole island. Olive production is the main occupation.

Maranovici also has its parish church of Sveti Anton.

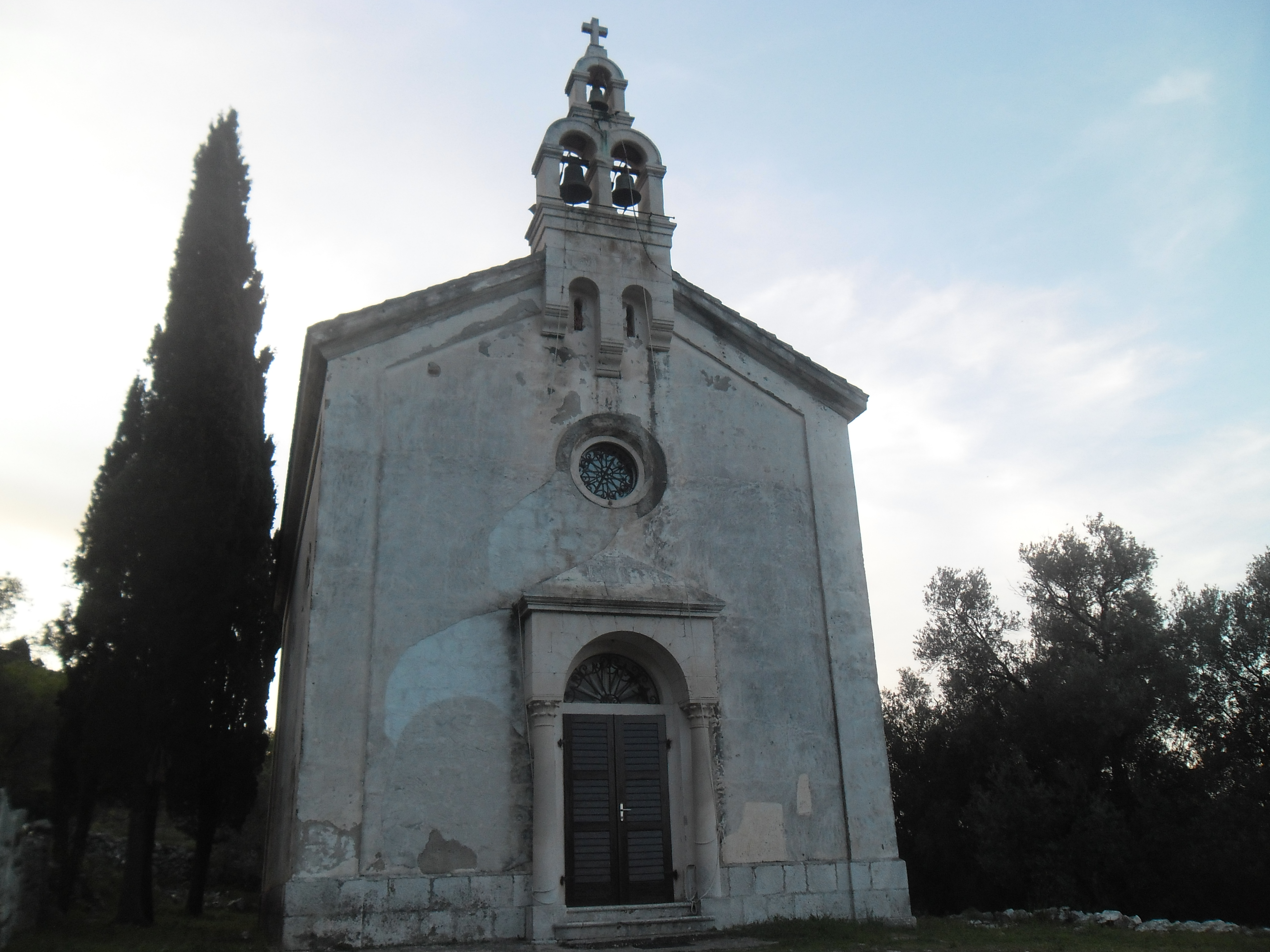
St. Anton's Church

== Demographics ==
According to the 2021 census, its population was 29.
