= Prožura =

- Village
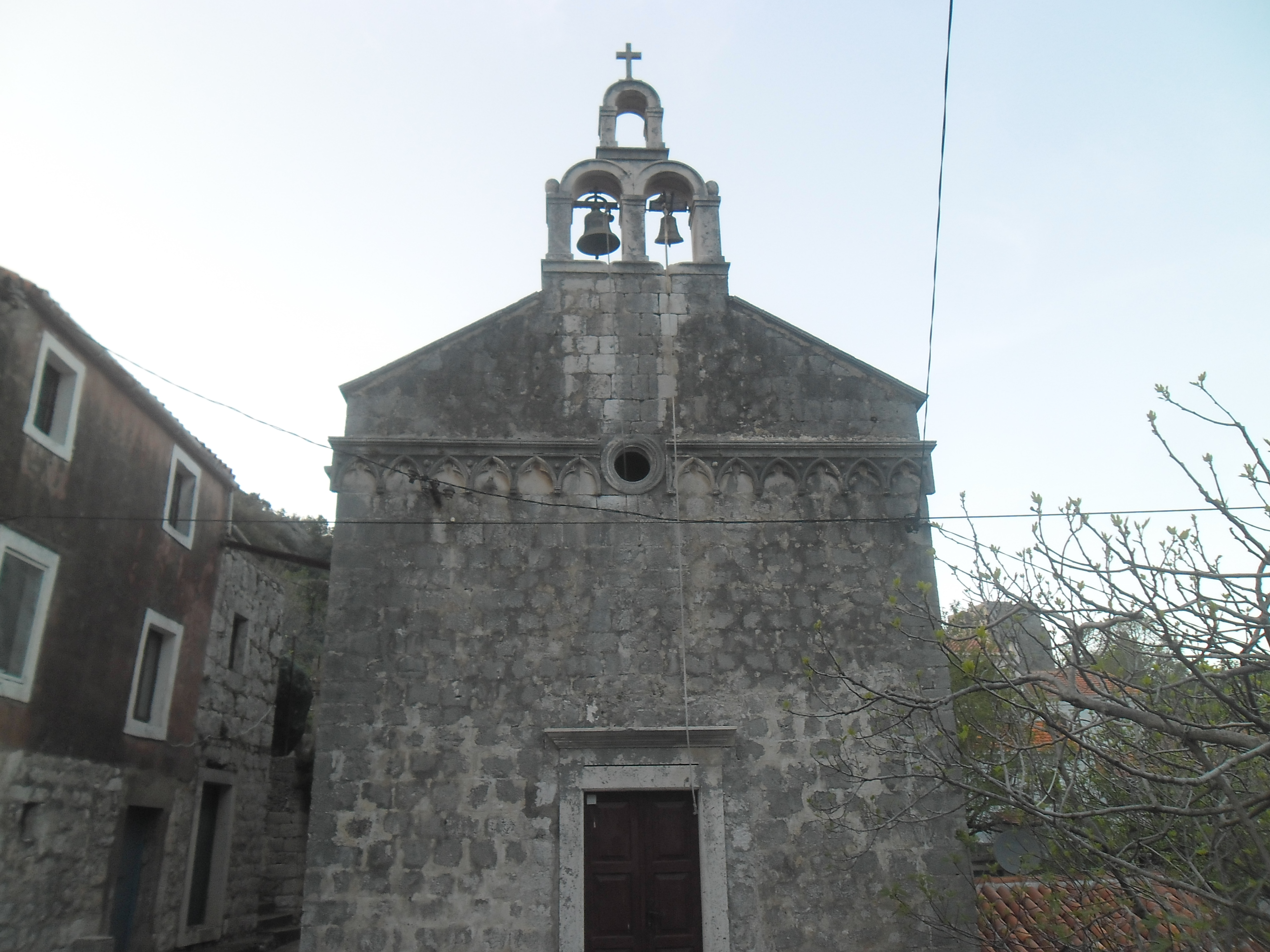
- Church of the Holy Trinity
- Interactive map of Prožura
- Location within Croatia
- Country: Croatia
- County: Dubrovnik-Neretva County
- Municipality: Mljet

Area
  - Total: 2.6 sq mi (6.8 km^{2})

Population (2021)
  - Total: 26
  - Density: 9.9/sq mi (3.8/km^{2})
- Time zone: UTC+1 (CET)
  - Summer (DST): UTC+2 (CEST)
- Postal code: 20225 Babino Polje
- Area code: +385 (0)20

Prožura is a village on the island of Mljet in southern Croatia. It is connected by the road D120.

== History ==
Dating back to medieval times, Prožura is one of the island's few settlements not visible from the sea. Defense against pirate threats relied significantly on Kaštio, a prominent square defensive tower from the 17th century that overlooks the village, as well as the clever strategies devised by the inhabitants. During the Dubrovnik Republic period, this small town served as a peaceful retreat for the nobility of Dubrovnik.

Prožura also features its own port, considered one of the most attractive bays on Mljet. Additionally, the area includes the Prožura mudflat, a location where eels were traditionally fished for centuries.

== Demographics ==
According to the 2021 census, its population was 26.

Naselje Prožura: Population trends 1857–2021
v

population	155	153	180	181	170	184	179	192	217	208	182	149	121	78	53	40	26
	1857	1869	1880	1890	1900	1910	1921	1931	1948	1953	1961	1971	1981	1991	2001	2011	2021

Note:In 1981, population data was reduced by separating part of the settlement into the new settlement of Prožurska Luka, for which it contains data up to 1971. Sources: Croatian Bureau of Statistics publications

== Landmarks ==
Church of the Holy Trinity
notable for its crucifixes
Church of St. Martin
dedicated to the village's patron saint Saint Martin
Church of St. Rok
the feast day of Saint Roch is commemorated annually on August 16th with a procession

== Gallery ==
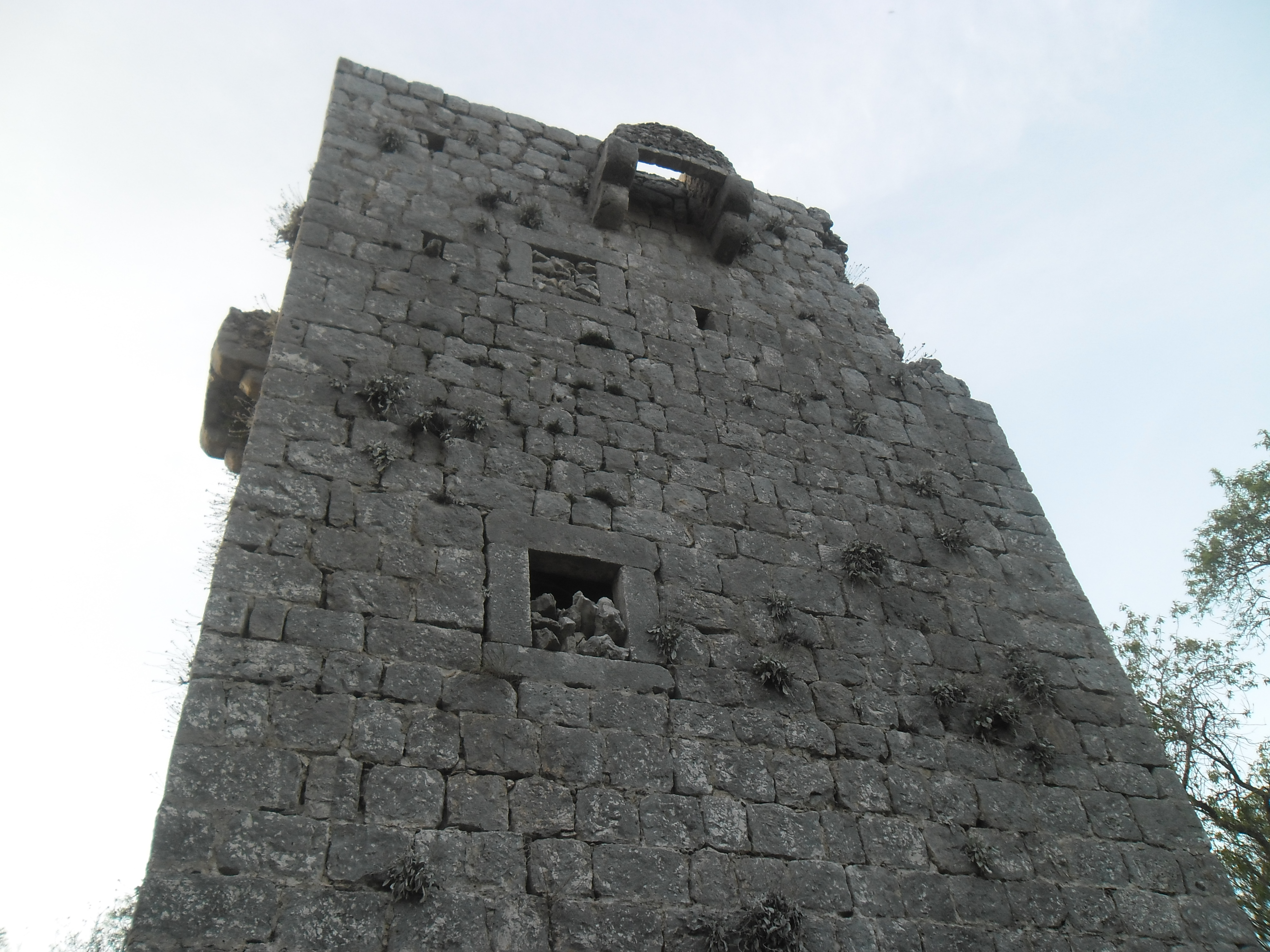
Tower

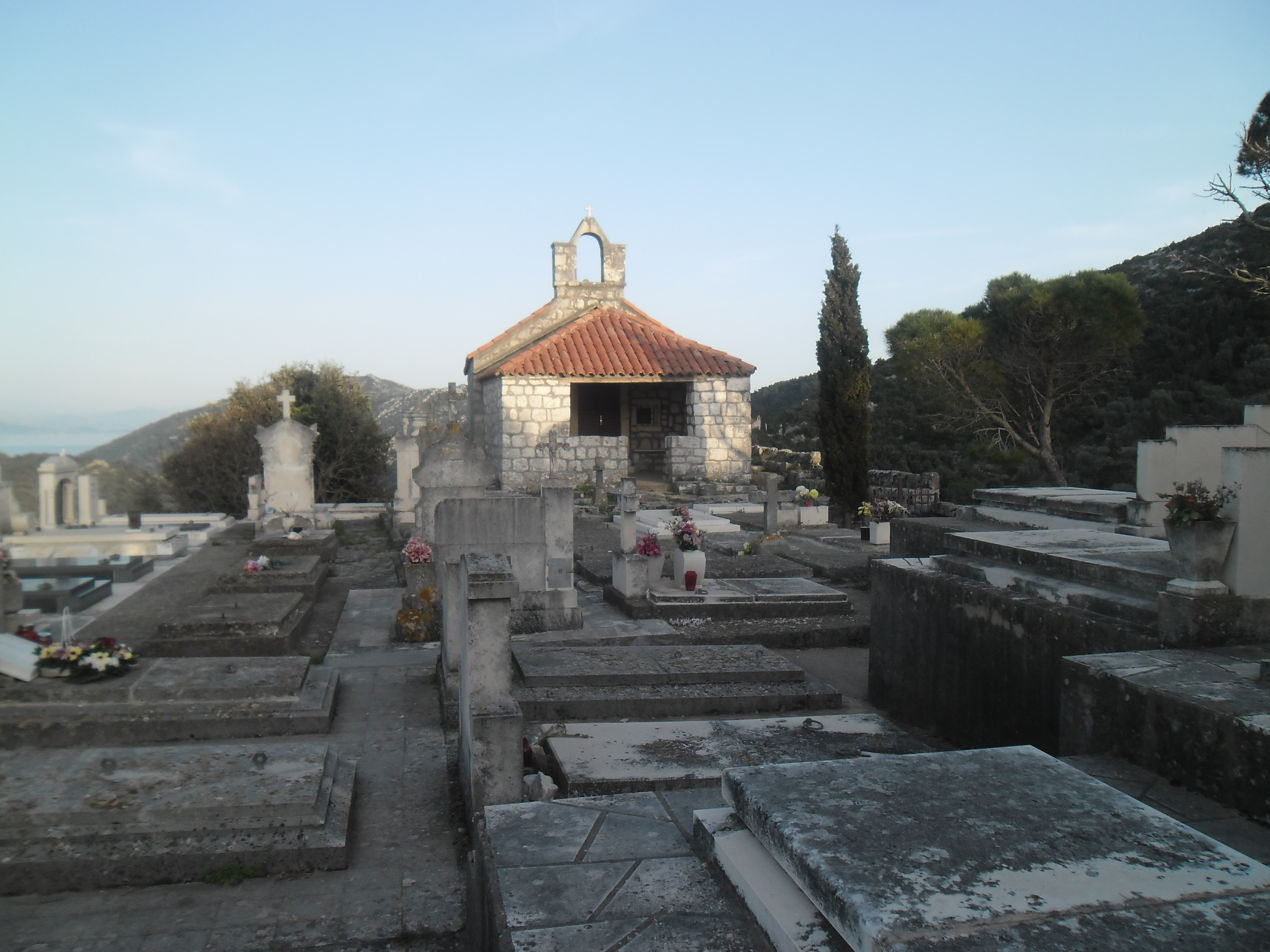
St. Martin's Church

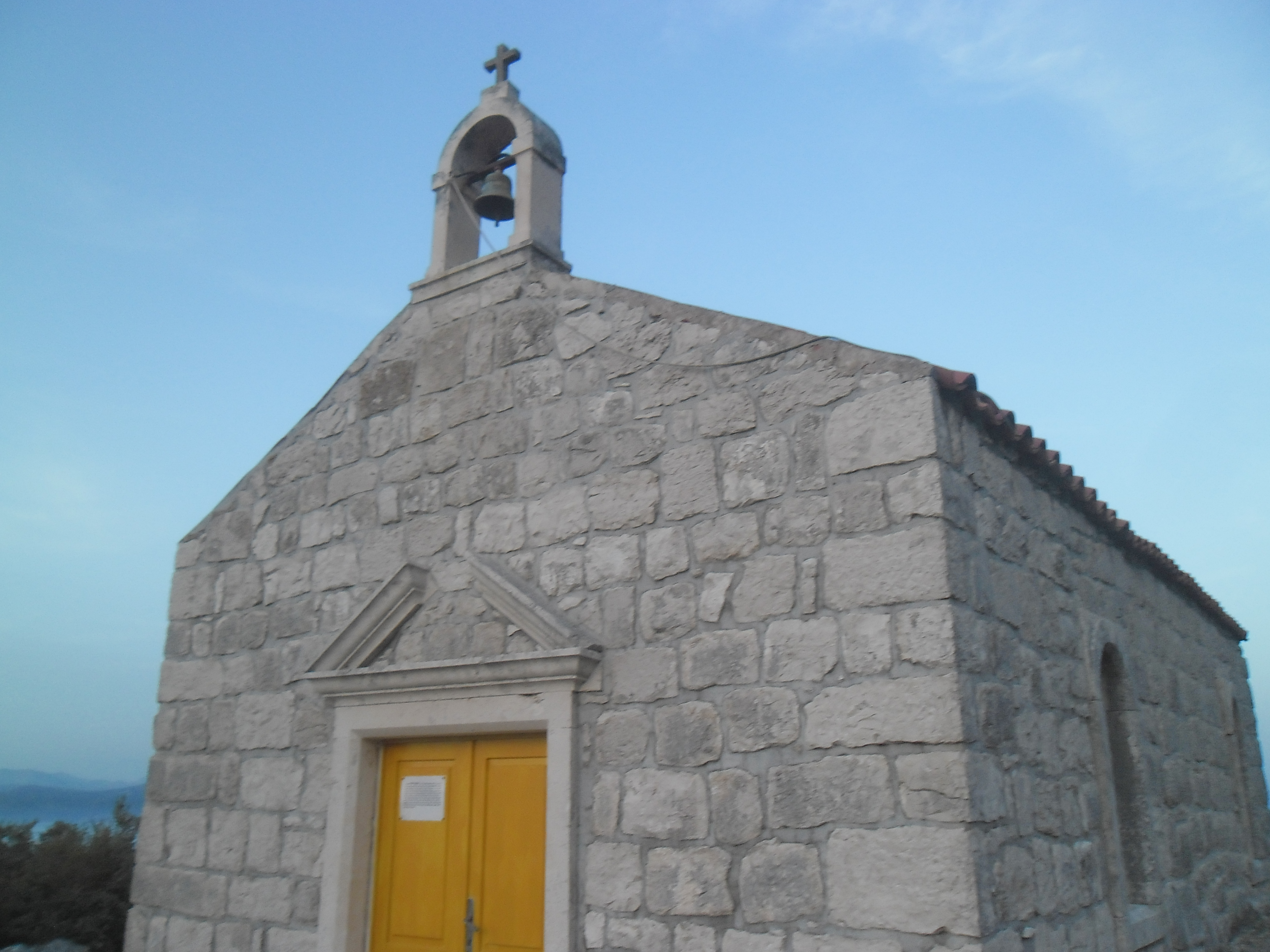
St. Roch's Church

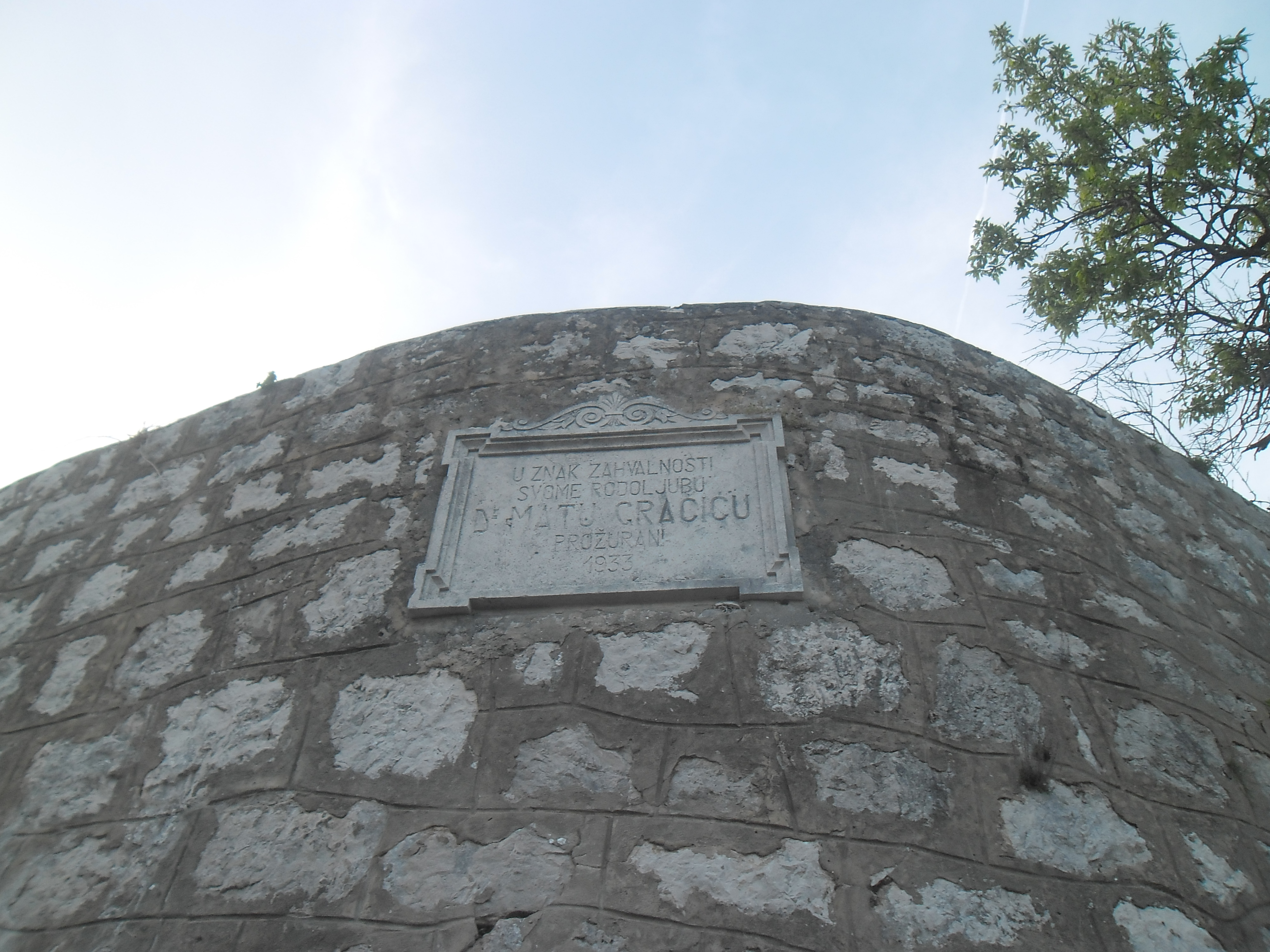
Memorial of Mato Gracić
