= Kozarica =

- Village
- Location within Croatia
- Country: Croatia
- County: Dubrovnik-Neretva County
- Municipality: Mljet

Area
  - Total: 0.69 sq mi (1.8 km^{2})

Population (2021)
  - Total: 30
  - Density: 43/sq mi (17/km^{2})
- Time zone: UTC+1 (CET)
  - Summer (DST): UTC+2 (CEST)

Kozarica is a village in Croatia, and is a part of Mljet, Dubrovnik-Neretva County.

== Demographics ==
According to the 2021 census, its population was 30.
