= Okuklje =

- Village
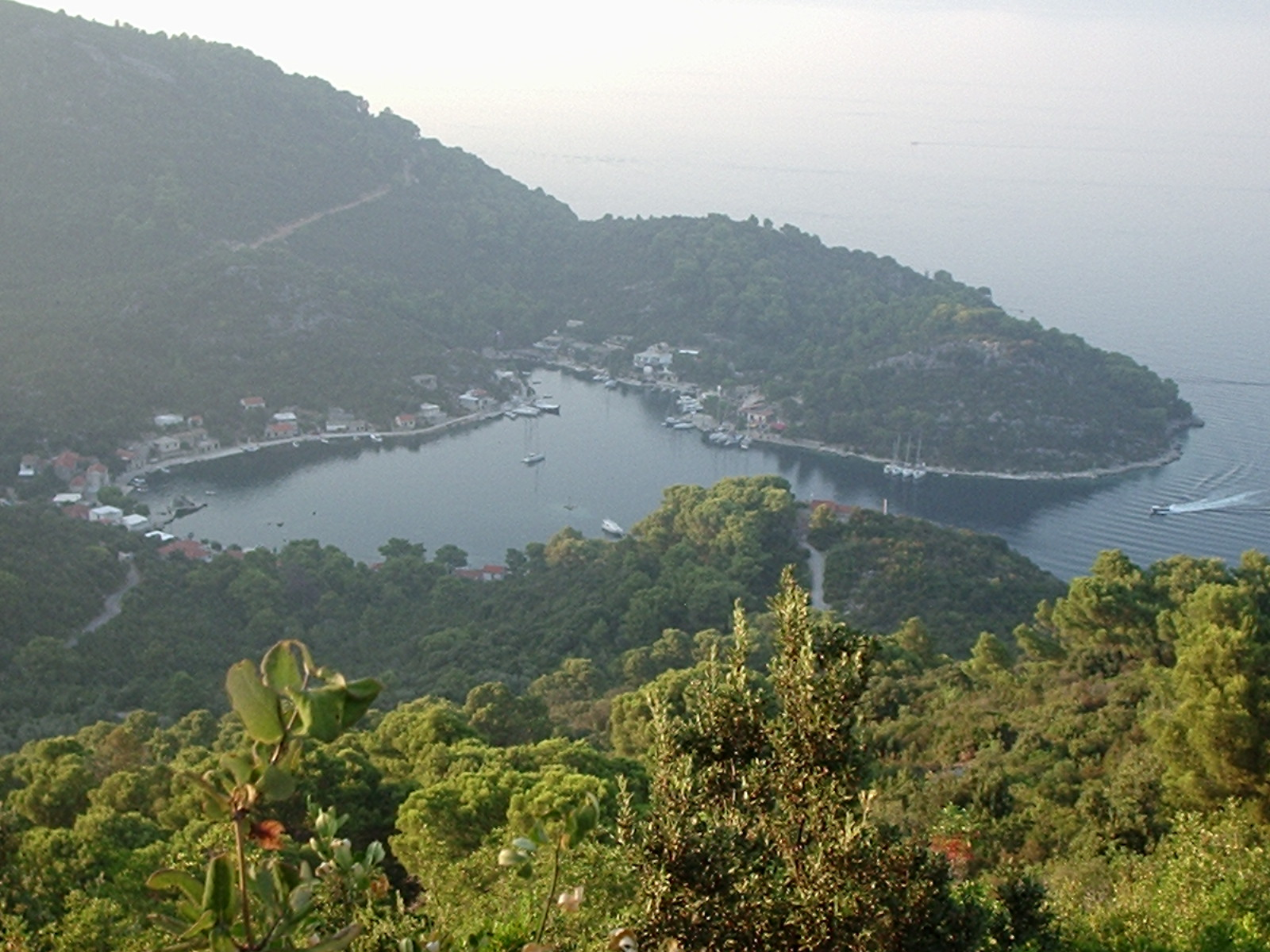
- Okuklje, a bay and port on the island of Mljet

- Location within Croatia
- Country: Croatia
- County: Dubrovnik-Neretva County
- Municipality: Mljet

Area
  - Total: 1.3 sq mi (3.4 km^{2})

Population (2021)
  - Total: 38
  - Density: 29/sq mi (11/km^{2})
- Time zone: UTC+1 (CET)
  - Summer (DST): UTC+2 (CEST)

Okuklje is a village on the island of Mljet in southern Croatia.

== Demographics ==
According to the 2021 census, its population was 38.
