= Polače =

- Village
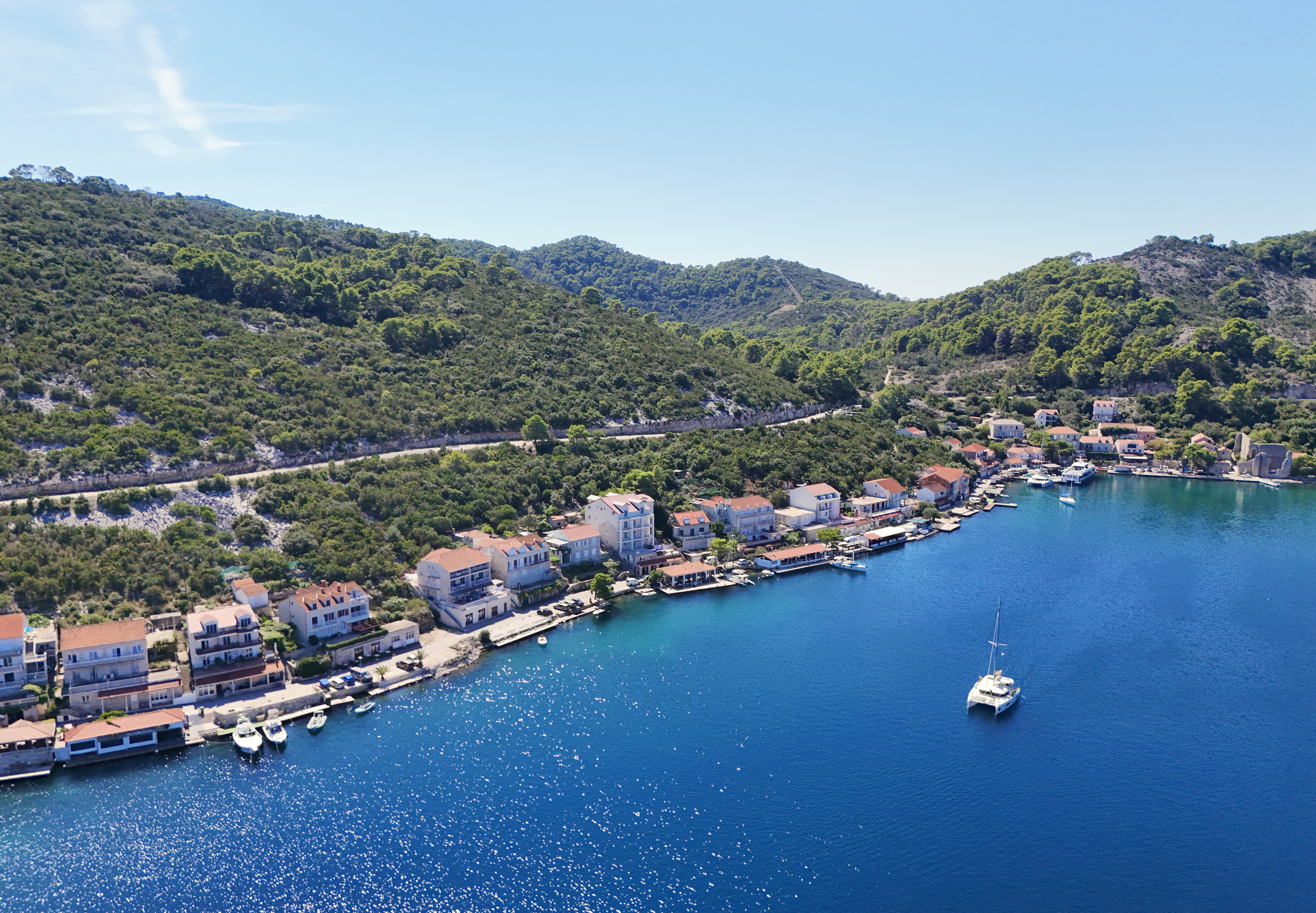

- Location within Croatia
- Country: Croatia
- County: Dubrovnik-Neretva County
- Municipality: Mljet

Area
  - Total: 5.6 sq mi (14.5 km^{2})

Population (2021)
  - Total: 111
  - Density: 19.8/sq mi (7.66/km^{2})
- Time zone: UTC+1 (CET)
  - Summer (DST): UTC+2 (CEST)

Polače is a village on the island of Mljet in southern Croatia, connected by the D120 highway. In the 2021 census, its population is 111. It is 113 in the 2011 census.
