= Mljet =

Adriatic island of Croatia

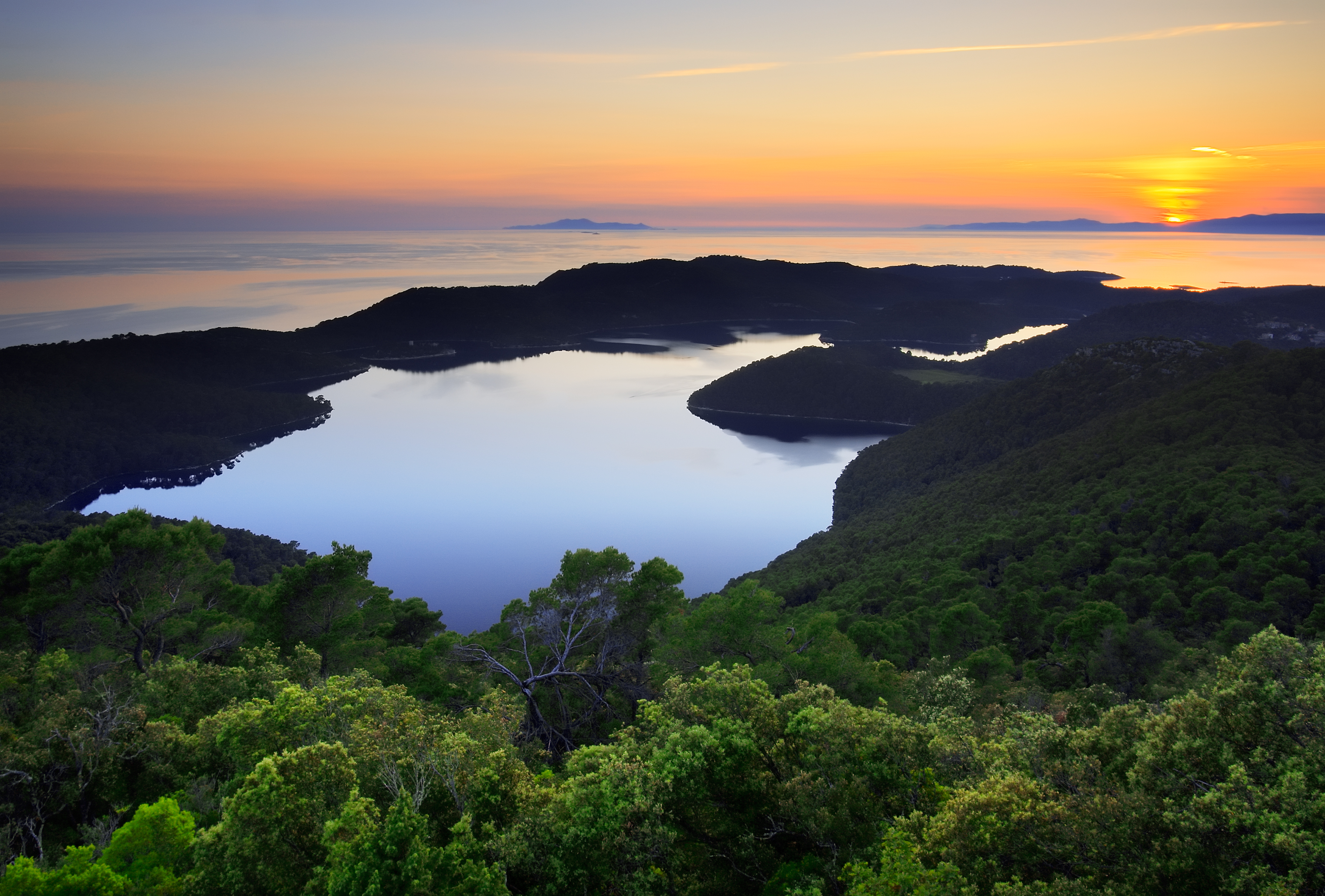
- Sunset over the Mljet lakes

- Location within Croatia
- Interactive map of Mljet

Geography
- Location: Adriatic Sea
- Coordinates: 42°44′42″N 17°32′06″E
- Archipelago: Adriatic islands
- Area: 98.01 km^{2} (37.84 sq mi)
- Length: 37 km (23 mi)
- Width: 3.2 km (1.99 mi)
- Coastline: 135.185 km (84.0001 mi)
- Highest elevation: 514 m (1686 ft)
- Highest point: Veliki grad

Administration
- Croatia
- County: Dubrovnik-Neretva County
- Largest settlement: Babino Polje (pop. 270)

Demographics
- Demonym: Mljećanin (male) Mljećka (female)
- Population: 1,088 (2011)
- Pop. density: 11.34/km^{2} (29.37/sq mi)
- Ethnic groups: 97.3% Croats; 2.7% others

Mljet (pronounced [mʎɛ̂t]) is the southernmost and easternmost of the larger Adriatic islands of the Dalmatia region of Croatia, known also as Croatia's "greenest island". In the west of the island is the Mljet National Park.

== Population ==
In the 2011 census, Mljet had a population of 1,088. Ethnic Croats made up 97.33% of the population.

In 2021, the municipality had 1,062 residents in the following 14 settlements:

- Babino Polje, population 262
- Blato, population 31
- Goveđari, population 138
- Korita, population 52
- Kozarica, population 30
- Maranovići, population 29
- Okuklje, population 38
- Polače, population 111
- Pomena, population 62
- Prožura, population 26
- Prožurska Luka, population 48
- Ropa, population 23
- Saplunara, population 83
- Sobra, population 129
Mljet: Population trends 1857–2021
v

population	1330	1381	1509	1623	1617	1915	1934	2050	2086	2054	1963	1638	1395	1237	1111	1088	1062
	1857	1869	1880	1890	1900	1910	1921	1931	1948	1953	1961	1971	1981	1991	2001	2011	2021

Sources: Croatian Bureau of Statistics publications

== History ==
Mljet was discovered by ancient Greco-Roman geographers, who wrote the first records and descriptions. The island was first described by Scylax of Caryanda in the 6th century BC; others prefer the text, Periplus of Pseudo-Scylax. In both texts, it is named Melite (Μελίτη) and supported by Apollonius of Rhodes. Agathemerus and Pliny the Elder call the island Melita. According to Pliny the Elder, citing Callimachus, the "Melitean lapdogs” (Μελιταῖά) derive their name from this island. Stephanus of Byzantium likewise addresses the origin of the dog's name, whereas other authors associate the dogs with Malta, which was also known as Melite in antiquity.

Appian reports that the Meliteni and the Corcyreans, described as islanders engaged in piracy, had revolted against Rome and were suppressed during the Illyrian campaigns of Octavian, who punished them harshly by executing the young men and enslaving the rest.

Agesilaus of Anaxarba in Cilicia, the father of Oppian, was banished to Mljet by the Roman Emperor Septimius Severus (AD 145–211) (or to Malta by Lucius Verus).

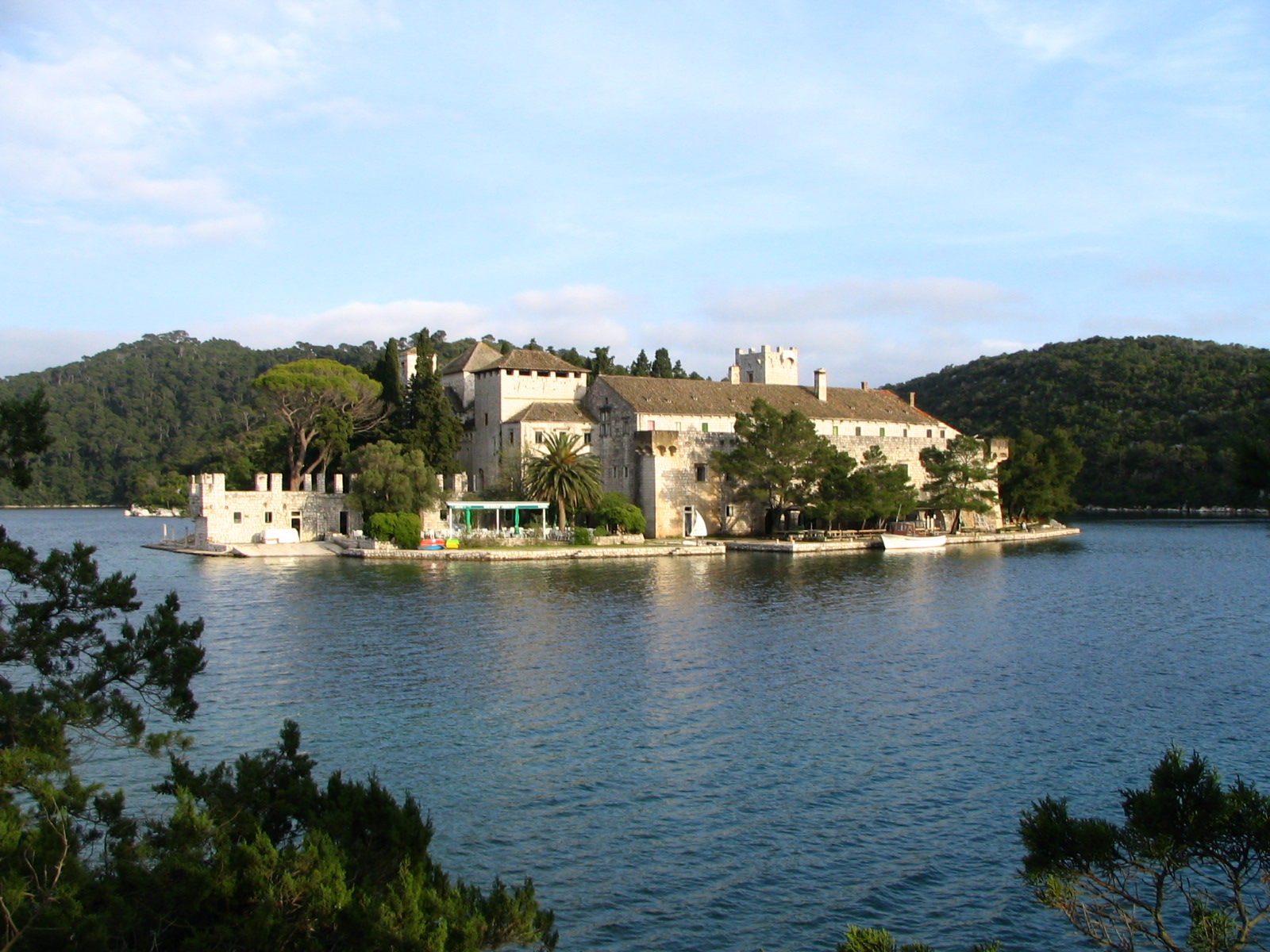
Monastery of Saint Mary

Mljet is mentioned around 950 by the Byzantine Emperor Constantine VII Porphyrogenitos in his De Administrando Imperio as one of the islands held by the Narentines. The island was often a controversy of ownership between them and Zachlumia. Ancient Greeks called the island "Melita" or "honey" which over the centuries evolved to become the Slavic name, Mljet (pronounced [mʎɛt]).

Mljet has been regarded as the "Melita" on which Paul the Apostle was shipwrecked (Acts of the Apostles 27:39–28:11), this view being first expounded in the 10th century, by Eastern Roman Emperor Constantine Porphyrogenitus. Paul's shipwreck is generally placed on the Mediterranean island of Malta. Mljet and Malta had the same name in the Greek and Roman sources; the mention of a viper in Acts 28:3–5 was thought to be in favour of Mljet (there are snakes on both Mljet and Malta but only the former is home to a venomous snake). Harbours named after the Apostle exist on both islands.

The Benedictines from Pulsano in Apulia became the feudal lords of the island in 1151, having come from Monte Gargano in Italy. They came ashore in the Sutmiholjska cove and in 1187–1198 Desa, Grand Prince of Serbia, of the House of Vojislavljević built and donated to them the Church and Monastery of Saint Mary on the islet in the Big Lake (Veliko jezero) towards the north-west end of the island. Pope Innocent III issued a document consecrating the church in 1198.

The Benedictines renounced their rule over Mljet in 1345, keeping only a third of the land. The island got a statute and a municipality in Babino Polje. It was formally annexed by the Republic of Ragusa in 1410. According to the Contract with the Benedictines, the municipality had to pay 300 perperas each year.

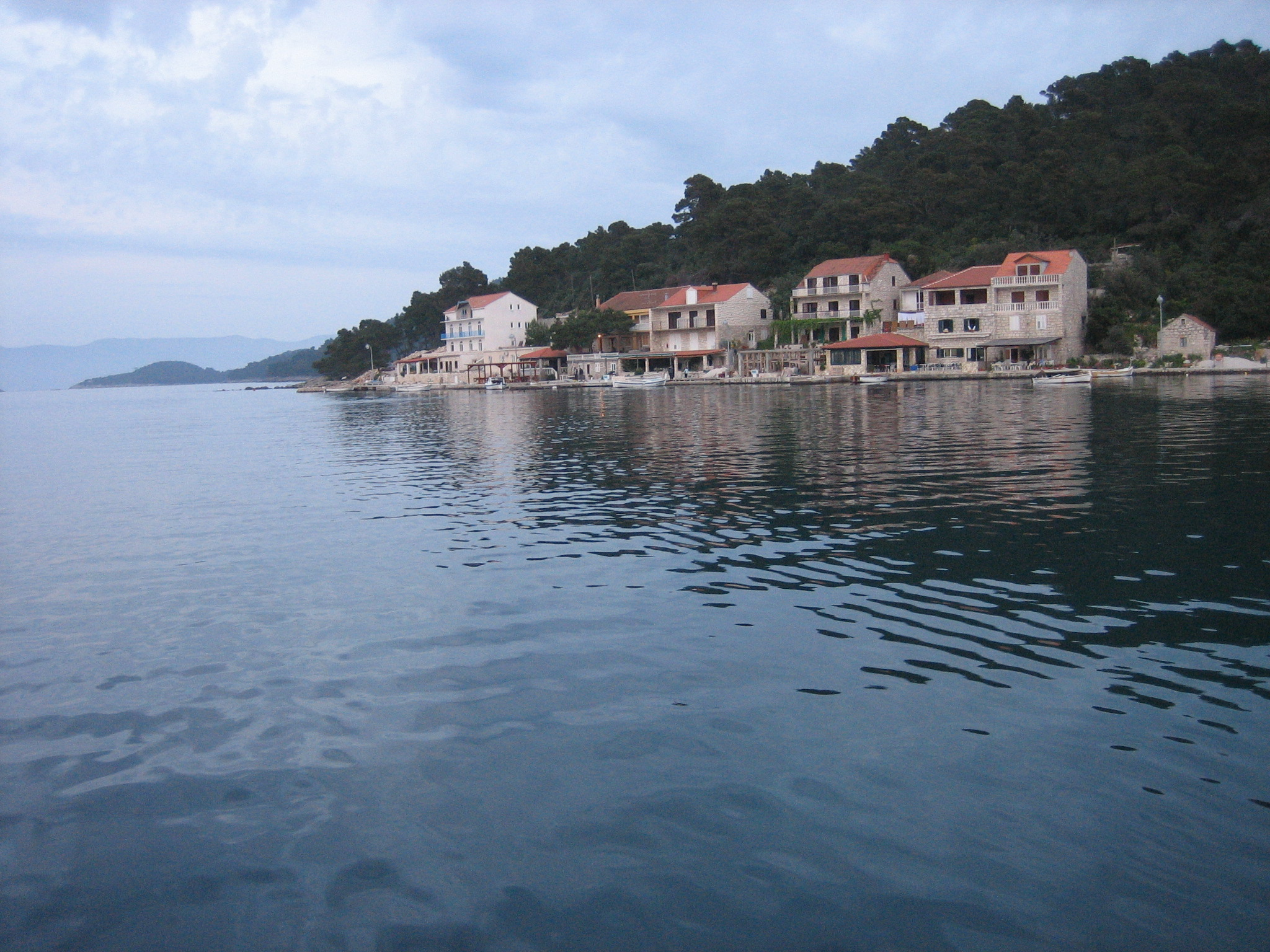
Seaside of Pomena

In the 16th century, the monastery was the center of the Mljet Congregation (Congregatio Melitensis or Melitana), gathering all the monasteries of Benedictine monks in the area of the Republic of Ragusa. The first president of the Congregation was Mavro Vetranović, the abbot of the Mljet monastery and the famous poet. Another great poet was abbot there—Ignjat Đurđević in the 18th century. As time went by, the Benedictine monastery on Mljet lost its importance, while the seat of the Mljet Congregation moved to Sveti Jakov near Ragusa.

In 1809, during the rule of Napoleon, the Mljet monastery was disbanded. When Austria took over the island, it placed the forestry office in the building. Between the world wars, the building was owned by the Diocese of Ragusa (Dubrovnik). In 1960 it became a hotel, and in 1998 it was returned to the Diocese. The island has a long history of eco-damage. In order to ease their transport problems, the monks dug a channel to the south coast, from the Big Lake, thus turning both fresh-water lakes into seawater-based ones.

The second incident involves mongooses. Small Indian mongooses were introduced onto the island in the early 20th century in order to reduce the Vipera ammodytes population (the island was apparently completely overrun). Whilst the mongooses completed this task, they also disposed of pretty much all the birdlife of the island. To this day, the island is notably short of hedgerow birds, such as sparrows. Mongooses are a hazard for domestic poultry, and are also known to cause damage in vineyards and orchards.

== Archaeology ==
In 2026, archaeologists investigating a Byzantine shipwreck near the island of Mljet recovered a collection of gold ceremonial belt sets decorated with emeralds, rubies, and pearls, gold solidi issued under the Heraclian dynasty, and a gold signet ring bearing the image of a Byzantine emperor. The shipwreck, dated to the late 7th or early 8th century CE, also contained amphorae, pottery, trading equipment, and other cargo associated with maritime commerce. Researchers interpreted the luxury regalia and imperial signet ring as evidence that the vessel likely transported a high-ranking Byzantine official or imperial representative, while the associated finds contribute to the study of Byzantine administration, long-distance trade, and maritime networks in the Adriatic during the Early Middle Ages.

== Geography ==
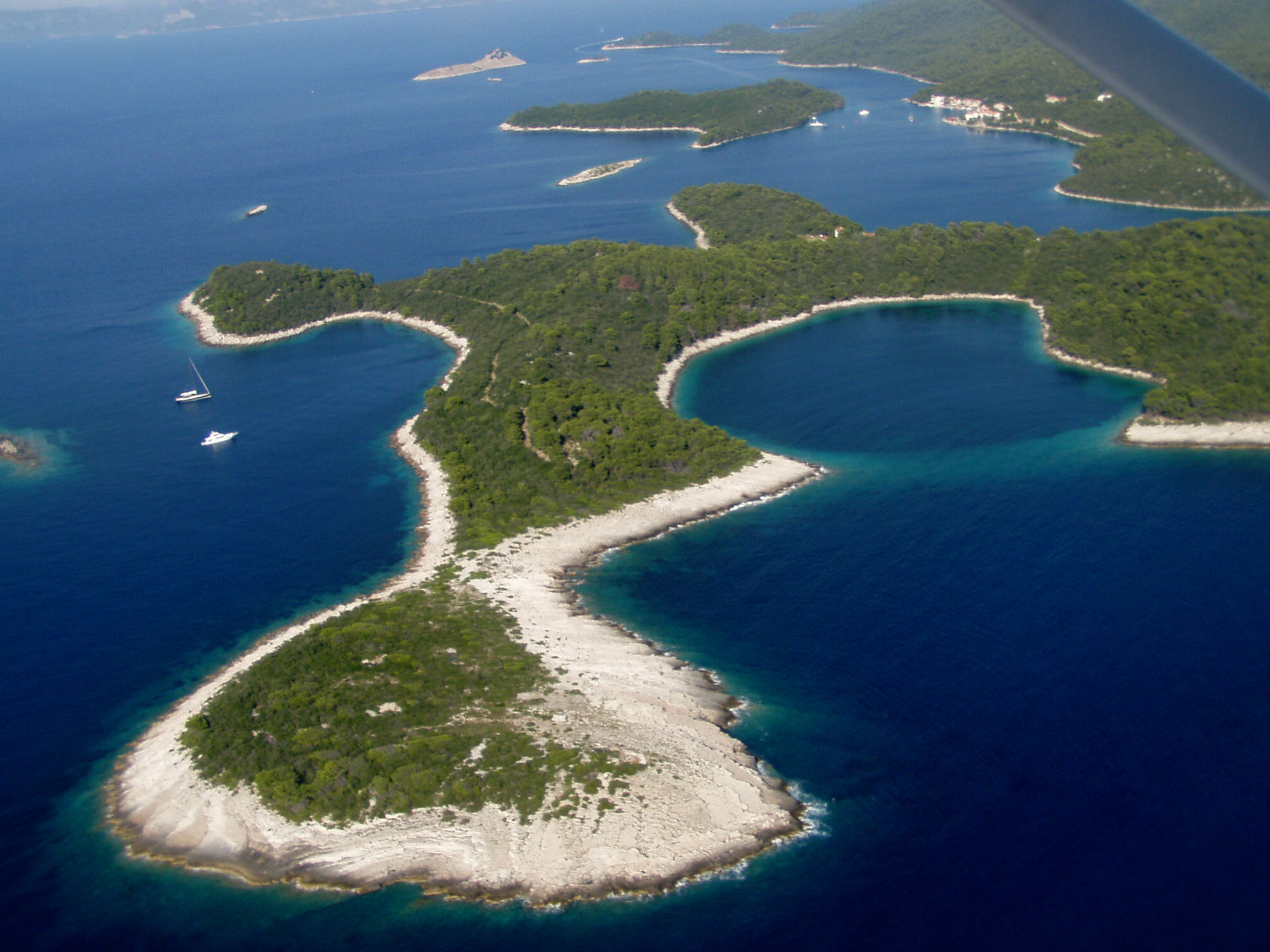
Goli Rat is Mljet's westernmost point

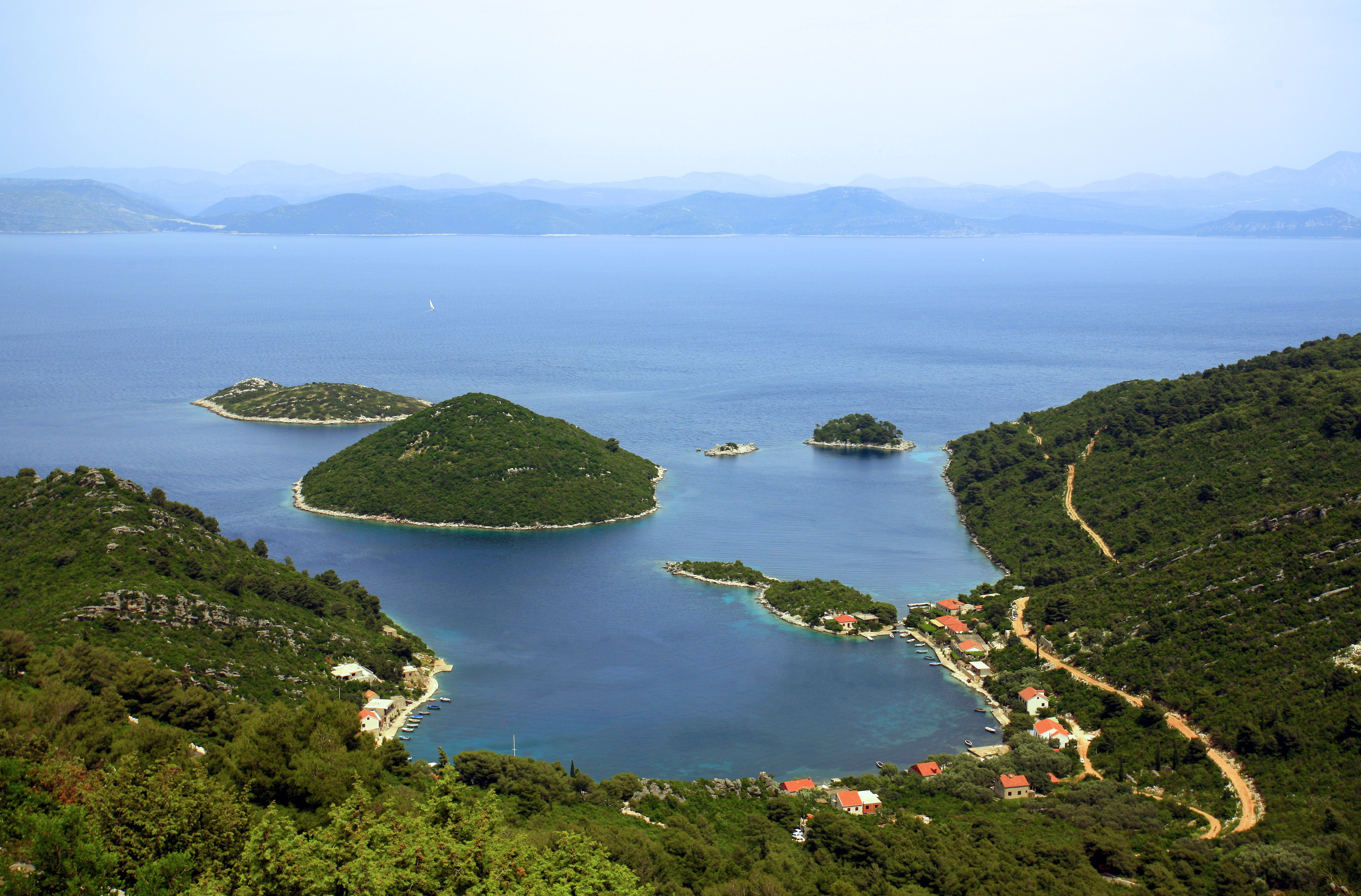
Prožurska Luka

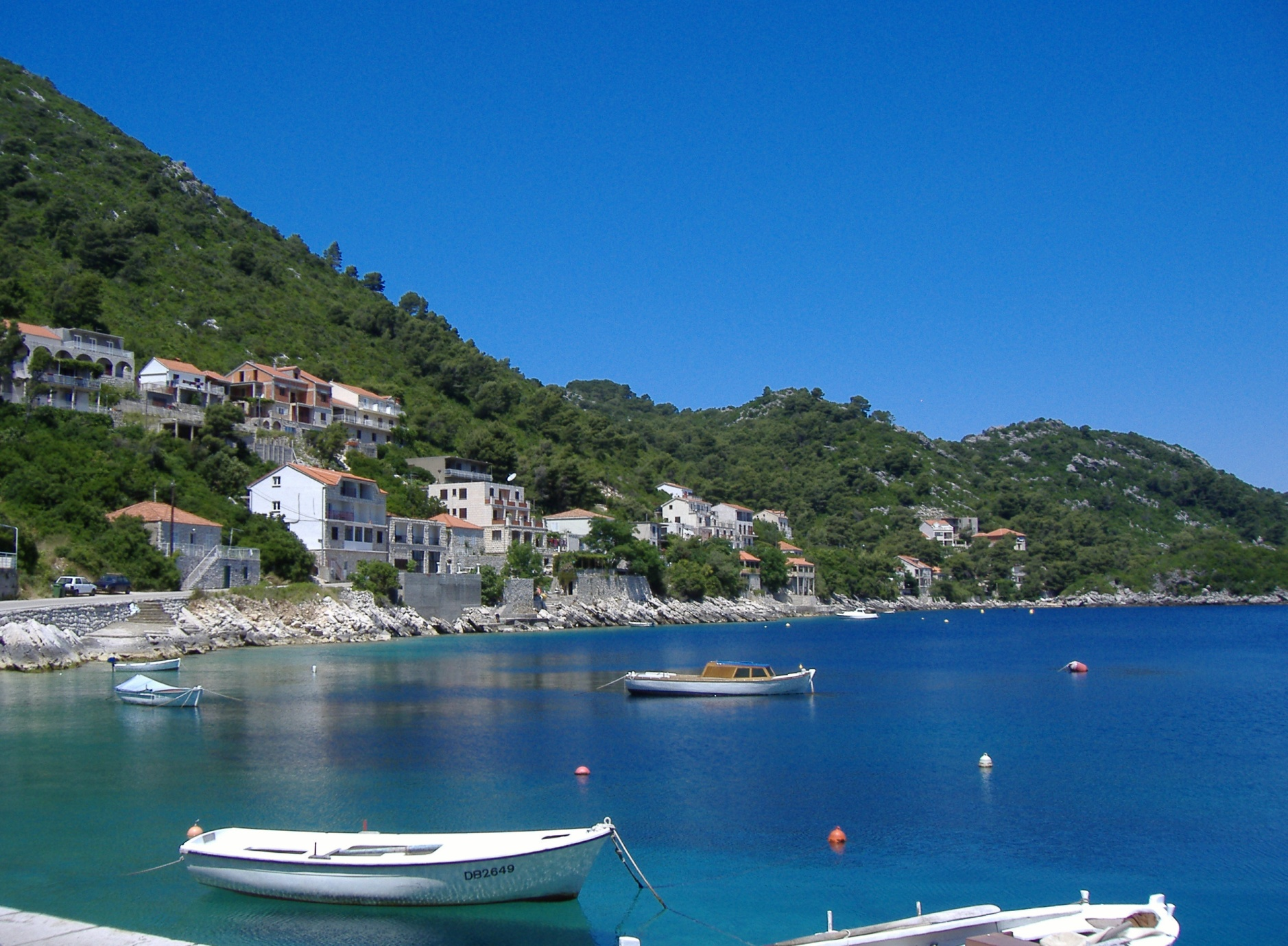
Sobra

Mljet lies south of the Pelješac peninsula, from which it is divided by the Mljet Channel. Its length is 37 km (23 mi); its average breadth 3.2 km (2.0 mi). It is of volcanic origin, with numerous chasms and gorges, of which the longest, the Babino Polje, connects the north and south of the island. Port Polače, the principal harbour in the north, is a port of call for tourist ferries. Mljet contains one hotel—The Odisej (from the Greek Odysseus) in the north-west corner of the island.

The northwestern part of the island includes an inland lake as well as a small island within it. It has been part of the Mljet National Park since November 12, 1960. Over 84% of the island of 98.01 km^{2} (37.84 sq mi) is forest. The island's geological structure consists of limestone and dolomite forming ridges, crests and slopes. A few depressions on the island of Mljet are below sea level and form non-permanent brackish lakes known as blatine ("mud-lakes") or slatine ("salt-lakes").

The climate is Mediterranean; an average air temperature in January is 9 °C (48 °F) and in July about 24 °C (75 °F). Precipitation (mostly falling between October and April) averages between 35 and 45 inches annually, with the hills receiving the highest amounts.

=== Settlements ===
According to the 2011 census, the settlements of Mljet have the following population:

- Babino Polje (270): largest settlement, police station, school
- Goveđari (151)
  - Babine Kuće
  - Pristanište
  - Soline
- Pomena (52)
- Polače (113): ferry port, Roman ruins
- Blato (39)
- Ropa (37): auto camp
- Kozarica (28)
- Sobra (131): ferry port
- Prožura (40)
  - Prožurska Luka (40)
- Maranovići (43)
- Okuklje (31)
- Korita (46)
- Saplunara (67): beach

== Transportation ==
The island of Mljet has no airport. Dubrovnik Airport on the mainland provides the main international connection for the island. Mljet has ferry lines with Pelješac peninsula and Dubrovnik. Transportation to the island is provided by Jadrolinija ferry service. Sobra, the main port on the island, is connected to Dubrovnik-Gruž and Ston via a car ferry. There are two type of ferries available: a car ferry and a faster catamaran ferry (2.5 hours and 90 minutes to Dubrovnik, respectively).

The two-lane paved D120 road runs throughout the island. Scheduled buses on Mljet travel just once or twice a day.

== See also ==
- Meleda disease
