= Goveđari =

- Village
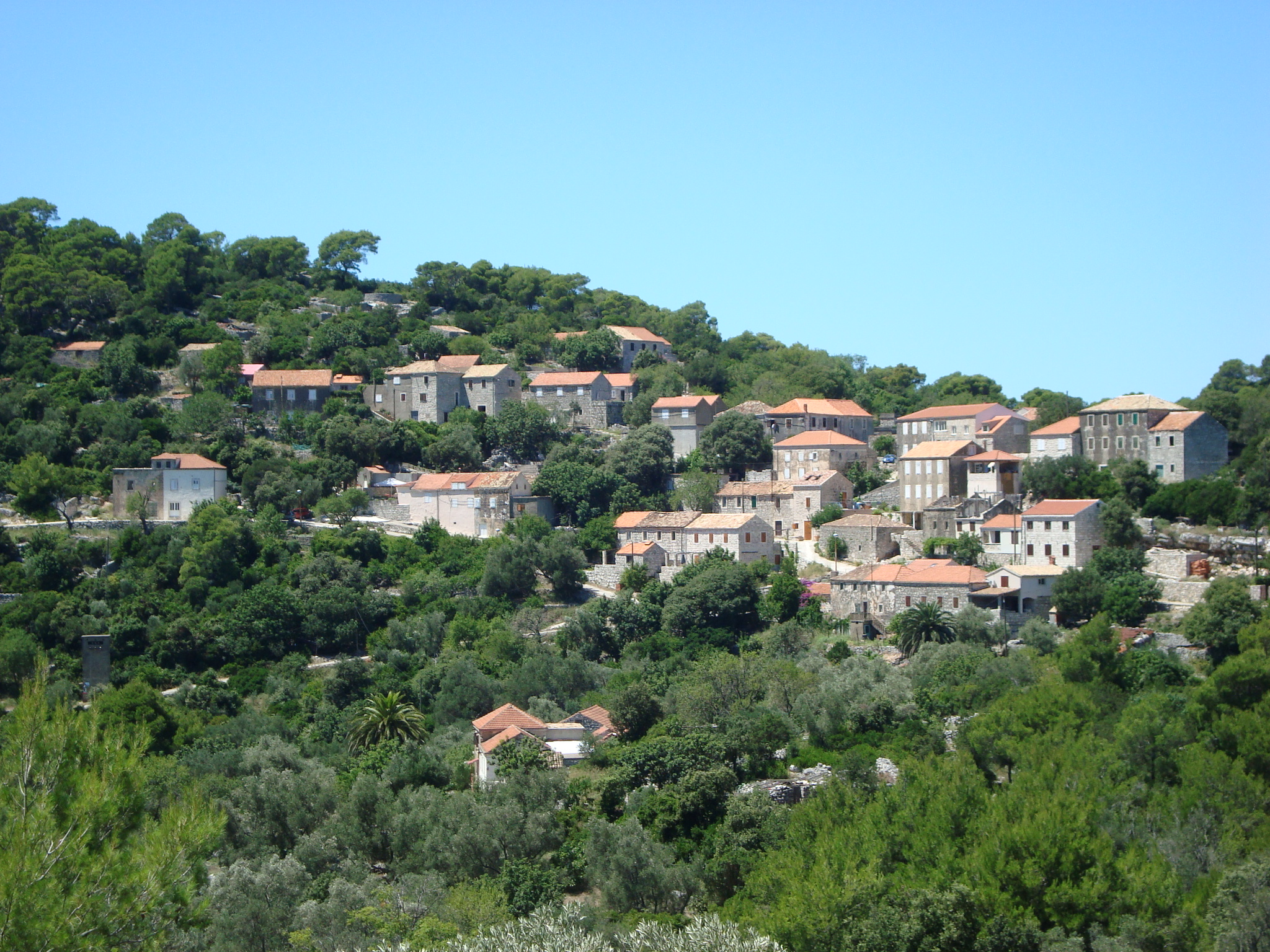

- Location within Croatia
- Coordinates: 42.7703432°N 17.3500645°E
- Country: Croatia
- County: Dubrovnik-Neretva County
- Municipality: Mljet

Area
  - Total: 3.9 sq mi (10.1 km^{2})

Population (2021)
  - Total: 138
  - Density: 35.4/sq mi (13.7/km^{2})
- Time zone: UTC+1 (CET)
  - Summer (DST): UTC+2 (CEST)
- Postal code: 20225 Babino Polje

Goveđari is a village on the island of Mljet in southern Croatia.

== Climate ==
Since records began in 1981, the highest temperature recorded at the local weather station was 40.8 °C (105.4 °F), on 10 August 2017. The coldest temperature was −7.2 °C (19.0 °F), on 7 January 2017. At Goveđari jedan, The coldest temperature was −2.8 °C (27.0 °F), on 18 February 18 February 2009.

== Demographics ==
According to the 2021 census, its population was 138.
