= Croatian wine =

Wine making in Croatia

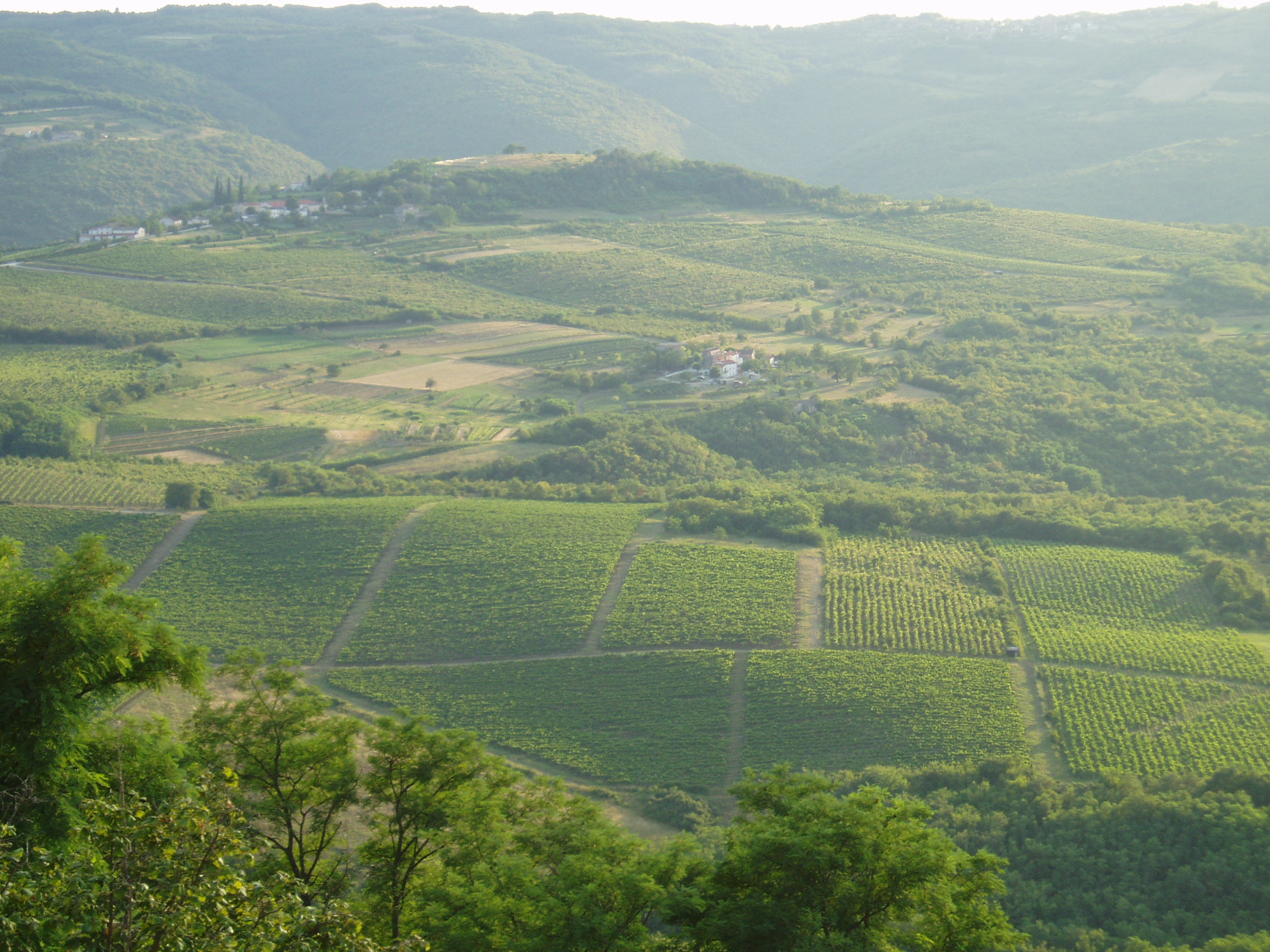
The vineyards of Istria, within Northern Croatia, in 2004

The production of wine (Croatian: vino, pl. vina) in Croatia dates back to the Ancient Greek settlers, and their wine production on the southern Dalmatian islands of Vis, Hvar and Korčula some 2,500 years ago. Like other old world wine producers, many traditional grape varieties still survive in Croatia, perfectly suited to their local wine hills. Modern wine-production methods have taken over in the larger wineries and EU-style wine regulations have been adopted, guaranteeing the quality of the wine.

There are currently over 300 geographically defined wine regions and a strict classification system to ensure quality and origin. The majority of Croatian wine is white, with most of the remainder being red and, and to a lesser extent, rosé wines. In 2014, Croatia ranked 32nd in wine production by country with an estimated 45,272 tonnes.

Wine is a popular drink in Croatia, and locals traditionally like to drink wine with their meals. The wine is occasionally diluted with either still or sparkling water—producing drinks known as gemišt (white wine and carbonated water) and bevanda (red wine and still water).

== History ==
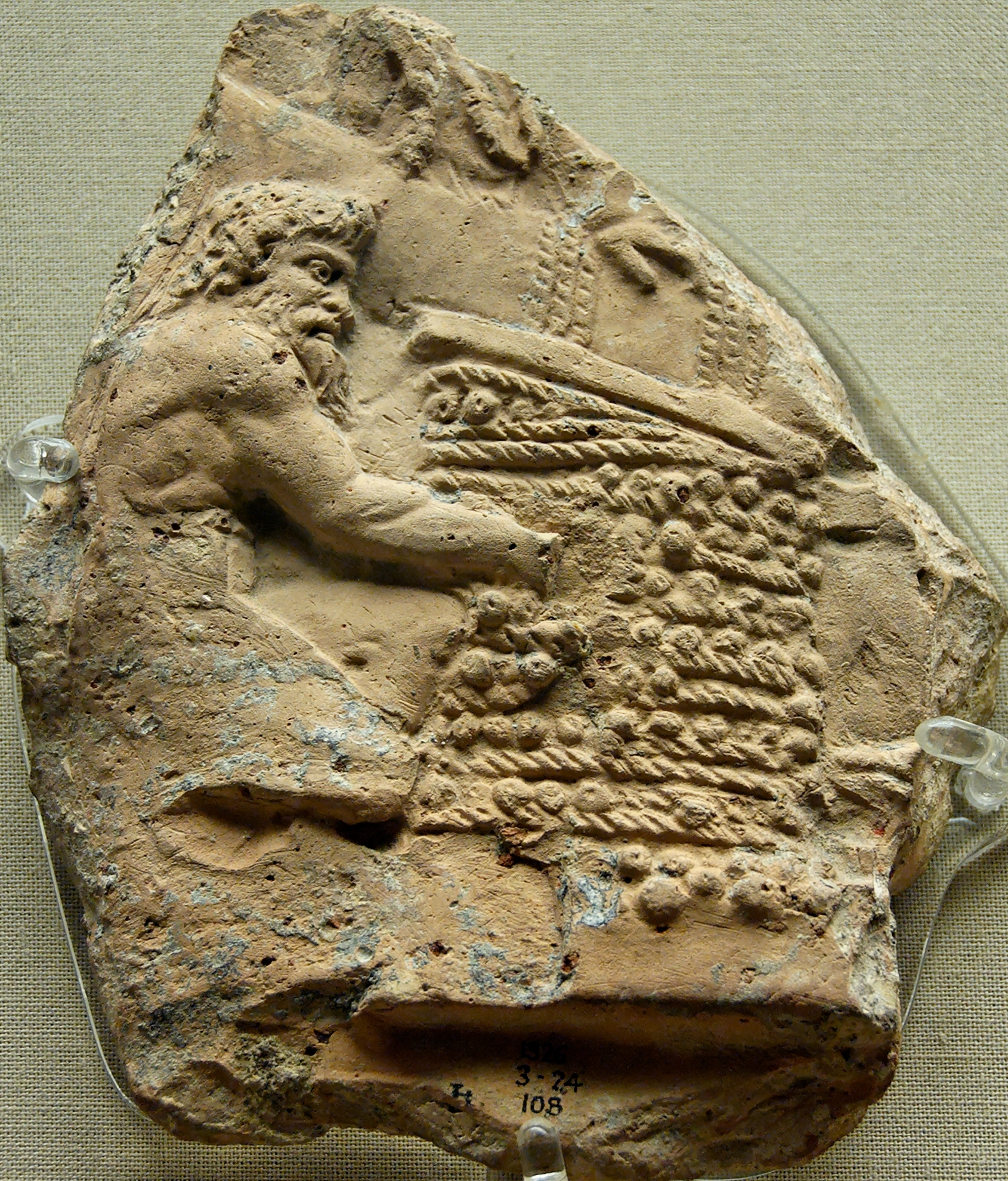
Wine press in Roman art from 1st century AD.

Like the rest of Central Europe and Southern Europe, viticulture in the present-day Croatia existed hundreds of years before the rise of the Roman Empire. Recent research has shown that the Illyrians living in Dalmatia during the Bronze Age and Iron Age may already have grown grapevines. The start of grape cultivation and wine production in Croatia is related to the Ancient Greeks settlers, who arrived on the Croatian coast in the 5th century BC. The Greek writer Athenaeus wrote 18 centuries ago about the high quality wine produced on the Dalmatian islands of Vis, Hvar and Korčula. Coins from the period have motifs related to grape cultivation and wine, demonstrating the importance of wine in the economies of the ancient Greek colonies.

Under the Roman Empire, wine production grew, becoming more organized. Wine was exported to other parts of the empire. Artifacts from this time include stone presses for squeezing grapes and amphoras from sunken Roman galleys. Decorations on numerous religious and household items bear witness to the wine-making culture.

As the Croatians arrived and settled the area, they learned from their predecessors, and wine production continued to expand. During the Middle Ages, there was a royal court official called the "royal wine procurer", whose responsibilities included the production and procurement of wine. Free towns adopted legal standards on winegrowing and protected it accordingly. A statute of the town and island of Korčula in 1214 contains strict rules protecting the vineyards.

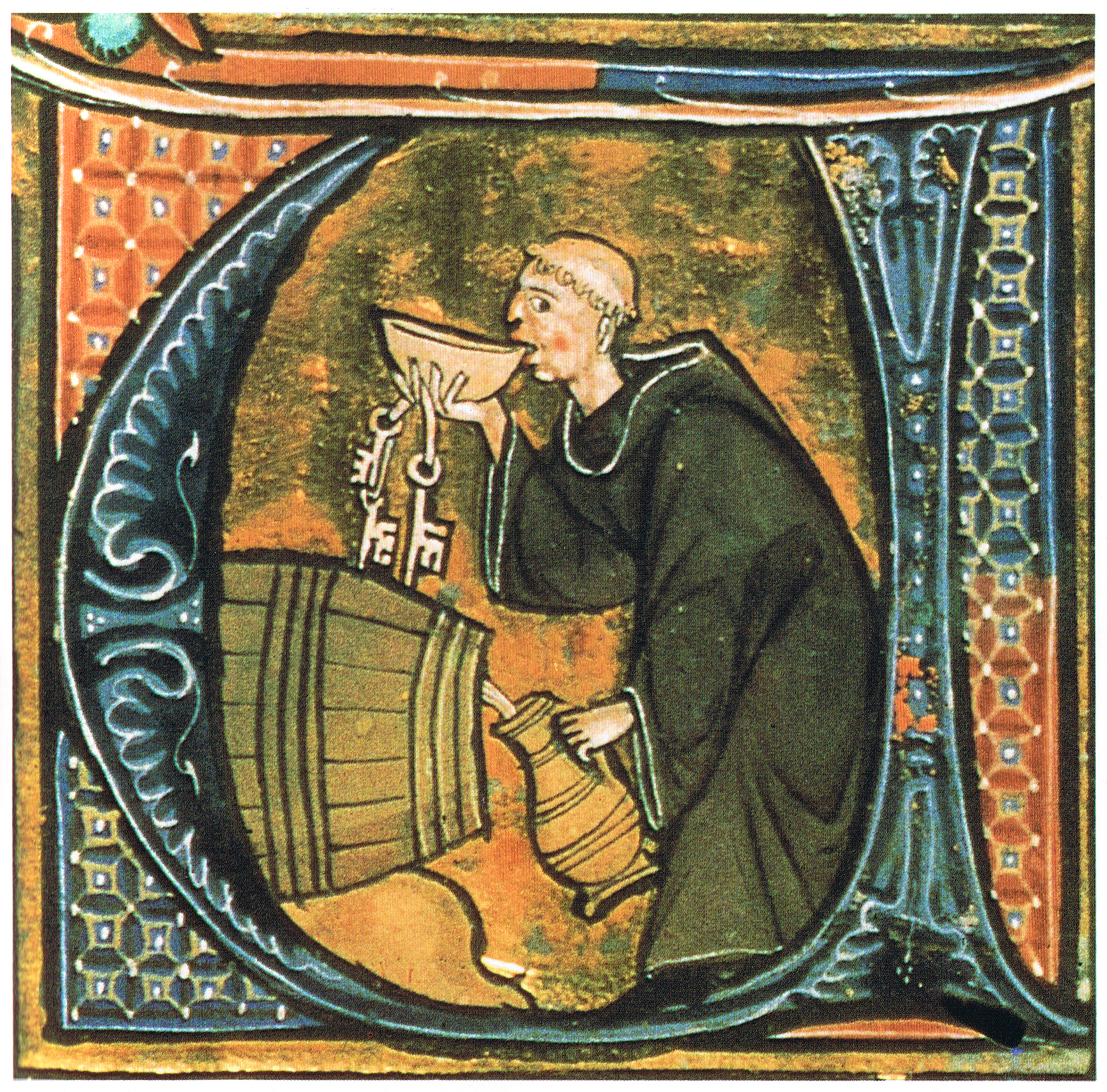
Priests and monks continued wine production in the 13th century

In the 15th century, the Ottoman Turks arrived in South Eastern Europe, and imposed strict anti-alcohol laws as part of the new Islamic law. Fortunately, the Ottoman Empire was tolerant of Christianity. Catholic church traditions involving wine may have “saved” local wine production from complete extinction—as priests and monks were permitted to continue making wine for church services.

In the 18th century, much of present-day Croatia came under control of the Habsburg Empire, where wine production flourished through the 19th and 20th centuries. The history of wine changed dramatically in 1874, when phylloxera, a hazardous grapevine pest, started to appear in Europe. Wine production dropped, first in France and Germany, as growers struggled with the blight. Croatian vineyards remained unaffected, and wine exports greatly increased to fill the demand. French companies even planted vines in Croatia with a view to expanding operations in the safe area. By the next century, Croatian vines had also succumbed to phylloxera, leading to the destruction of the vineyards and the collapse of the local economy in many areas. Large numbers of winegrowing families moved to the new world, contributing to the growth of wine production abroad.

Under the communist system of Yugoslavia, wine production was centered in large cooperatives, and private ownership of vineyards was discouraged. Quantity rather than quality became the main focus. The Croatian War of Independence in the early 1990s saw many vineyards and wineries once again destroyed. With the move back to small, independent producers, Croatian wines are once again competing with wine makers across the world.

== Geography and climate ==
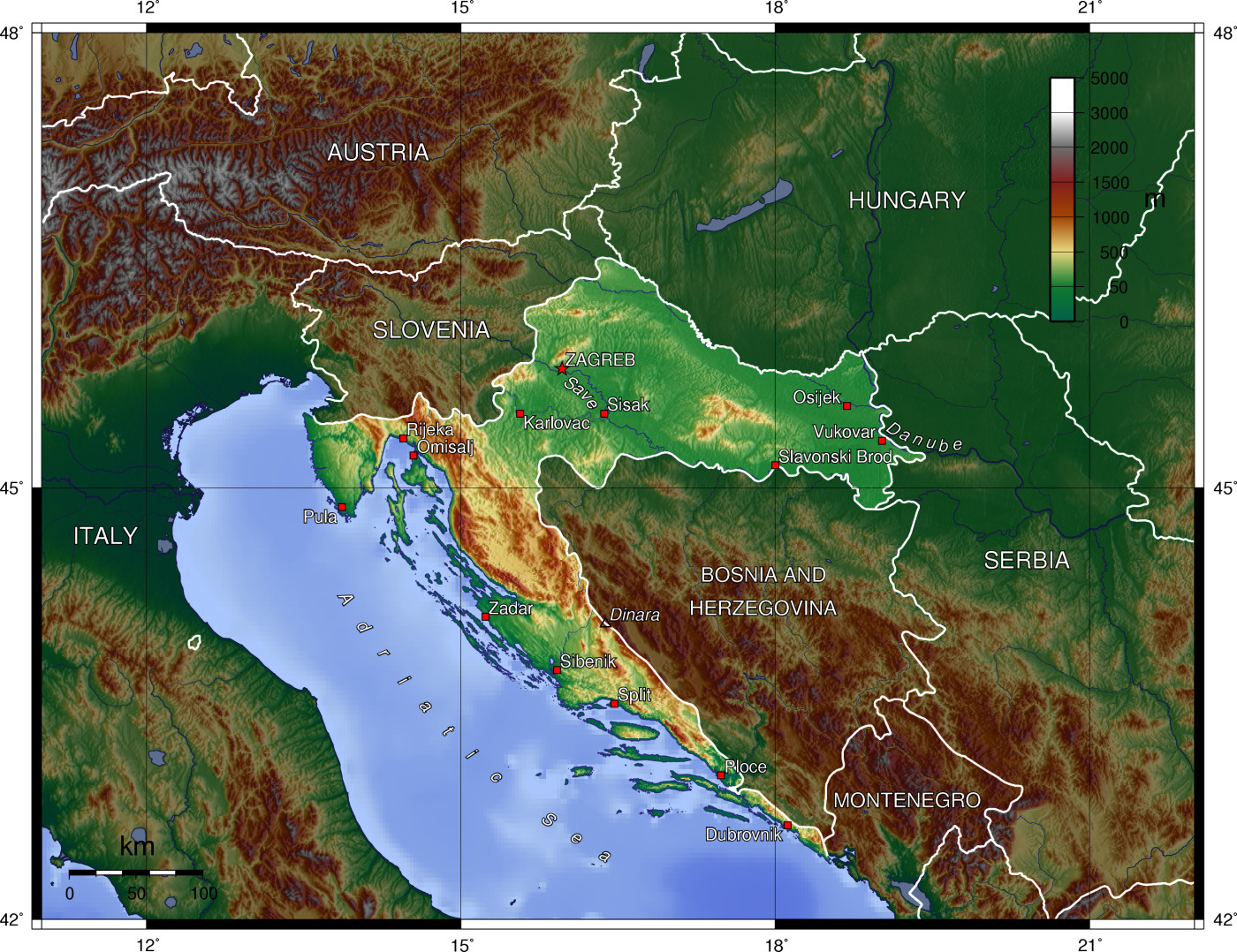
Croatia's winegrowing regions are affected by the Alps to the north, and the Dinaric Alps running down the Adriatic coast.

Croatia is a Mediterranean country, lying to the east of Italy, across the Adriatic Sea. Towards the north lie the Alps, and to the north-east the country forms the western end of the great Pannonian Plain.

The interior of Croatia has a continental climate, with cold winters, and hot summers with enough rain to make it a major agricultural area. Winegrowing is concentrated in the hilly areas bordering on the Pannonian Plain.

The Dalmatian Coast is typically Mediterranean in climate, though the Dinaric Alps mountain range creates pockets of alpine climate at higher altitudes. The coastline of the Adriatic Sea is ideal for grape cultivation with its hot, humid summers and mild winters. Further down the coast, and on the islands, grapes are grown on the karst hillside, sometimes steep slopes with little rainfall. Some of the best-known wine-production areas are on the Dalmatian islands. Located along hillsides and slopes, wine regions along the coast receive many hours of sunlight, ideal for grape production. Croatia is also home to the Slavonian oak forest, which provides oak for the casks favoured by many European winemakers for aging their finest wines.

The average inland temperature is between 0 and 2 °C in January, and between 19 and 23 °C in August. Average coastal temperatures range from 6–11 °C in January to 21–27 °C in August. Sea temperature averages 12 °C in winter and 25 °C in summer.

== Wine styles ==
There are two distinct wine-producing regions in Croatia. The continental region in the north-east of the country produces rich fruity white wines, similar in style to the neighbouring areas of Slovenia, Austria and Hungary. On the north coast, Istrian wines are similar to those produced in neighbouring Italy, while further south production is more towards big Mediterranean-style reds. On the islands and the Dalmatian coast, local grape varieties, microclimates and the rather harsh nature of the vineyards leads to some highly individual wines, and some of Croatia's best known.

The majority (67%) of wine produced is white and produced in the interior, while 32% is red and produced mainly along the coast. Rosé is relatively rare. Some special wines, such as sparkling wine (pjenušavo vino or pjenušac) and dessert wine, are also produced.

== Wine regions ==
Croatian regional administrative divisions

Croatia has three main wine regions: Eastern Continental (Istočna kontinentalna), Western Continental (Zapadna kontinentalna) and Coastal (Primorska), which also includes the islands. Each of the main regions is divided into sub-regions, which are divided yet further into smaller vinogorje (literally wine hills). Altogether, there are more than 300 geographically defined wine-producing areas in Croatia. More than half of the wine production is concentrated in three counties: Istria, Osijek-Baranja and Vukovar-Srijem.

=== Eastern continental Croatia ===
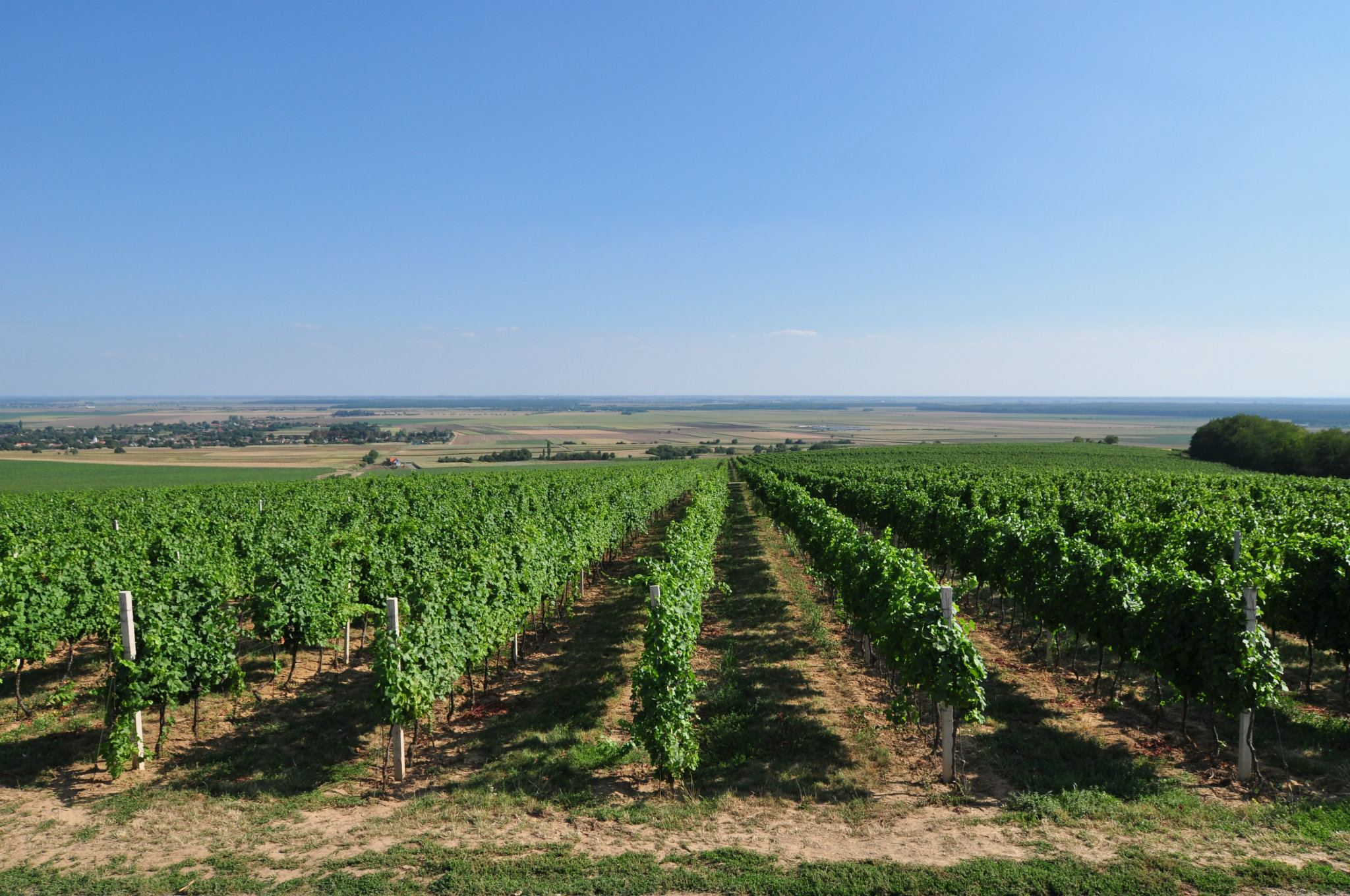
Vineyard in Zmajevac, 2015

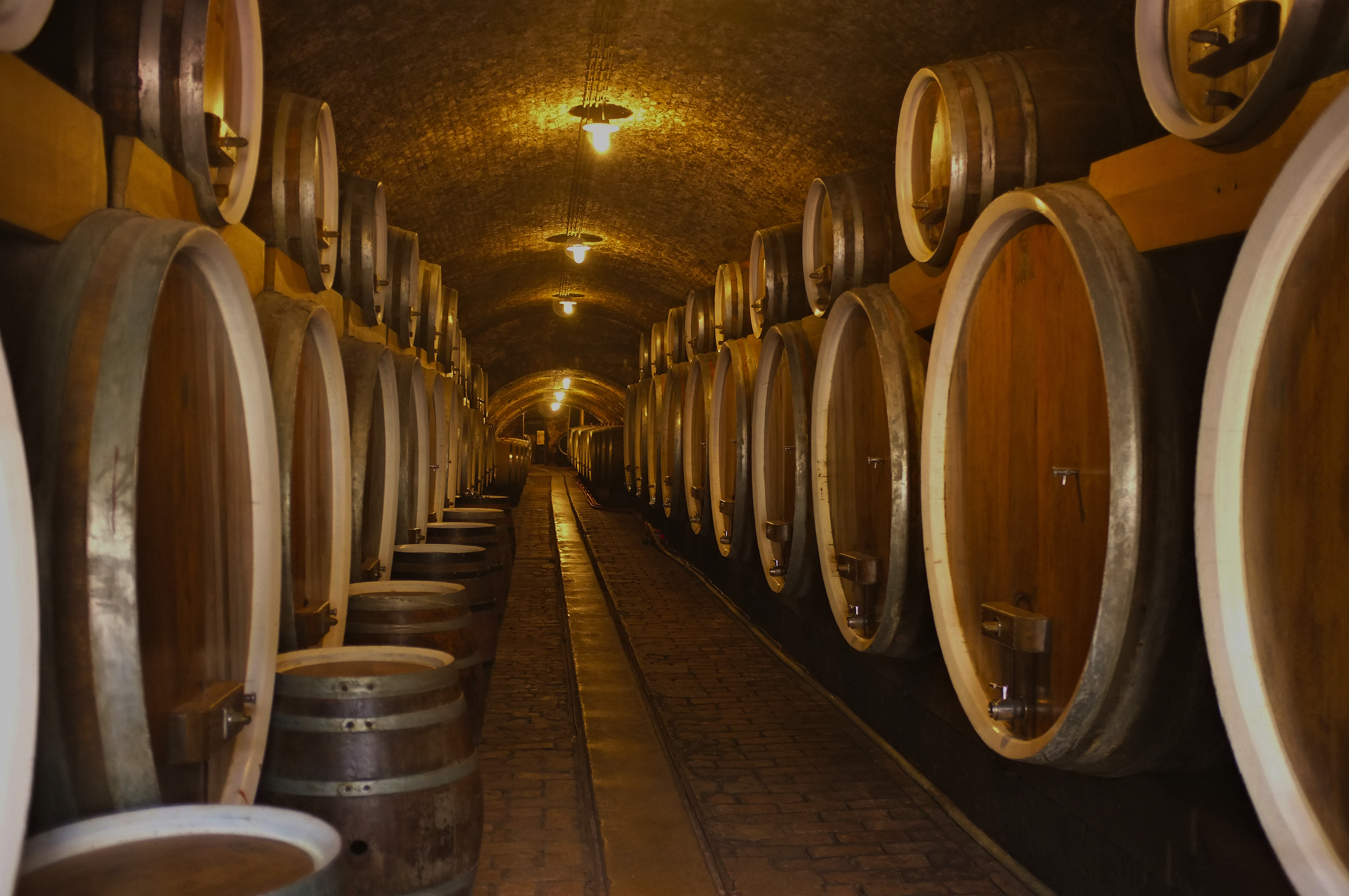
Ilok, 2013

The eastern inland wine region includes Slavonia and the Croatian Danube. It is a relatively flat area bordered by three rivers: the Danube, Drava and Sava. Vineyards are generally located on the low hills rising from the plain. It has a typical continental climate with cold winters and hot summers, and production is concentrated in white wine varieties. The best-known area within this region is Slavonia; the most widely planted grape is Graševina, which yields light, crisp, refreshing, mildly aromatic wines.

The continental region is divided into the following sub-regions:

Sub-region	Winehills (Vinogorje)
Podunavlje	Baranja, Erdut, Srijem
Slavonia	Daruvar, Đakovo, Feričanci, Kutjevo, Nova Gradiška, Orahovica-Slatina, Pakrac, Požega-Pleternica, Slavonski Brod, Virovitica

=== Western continental Croatia ===
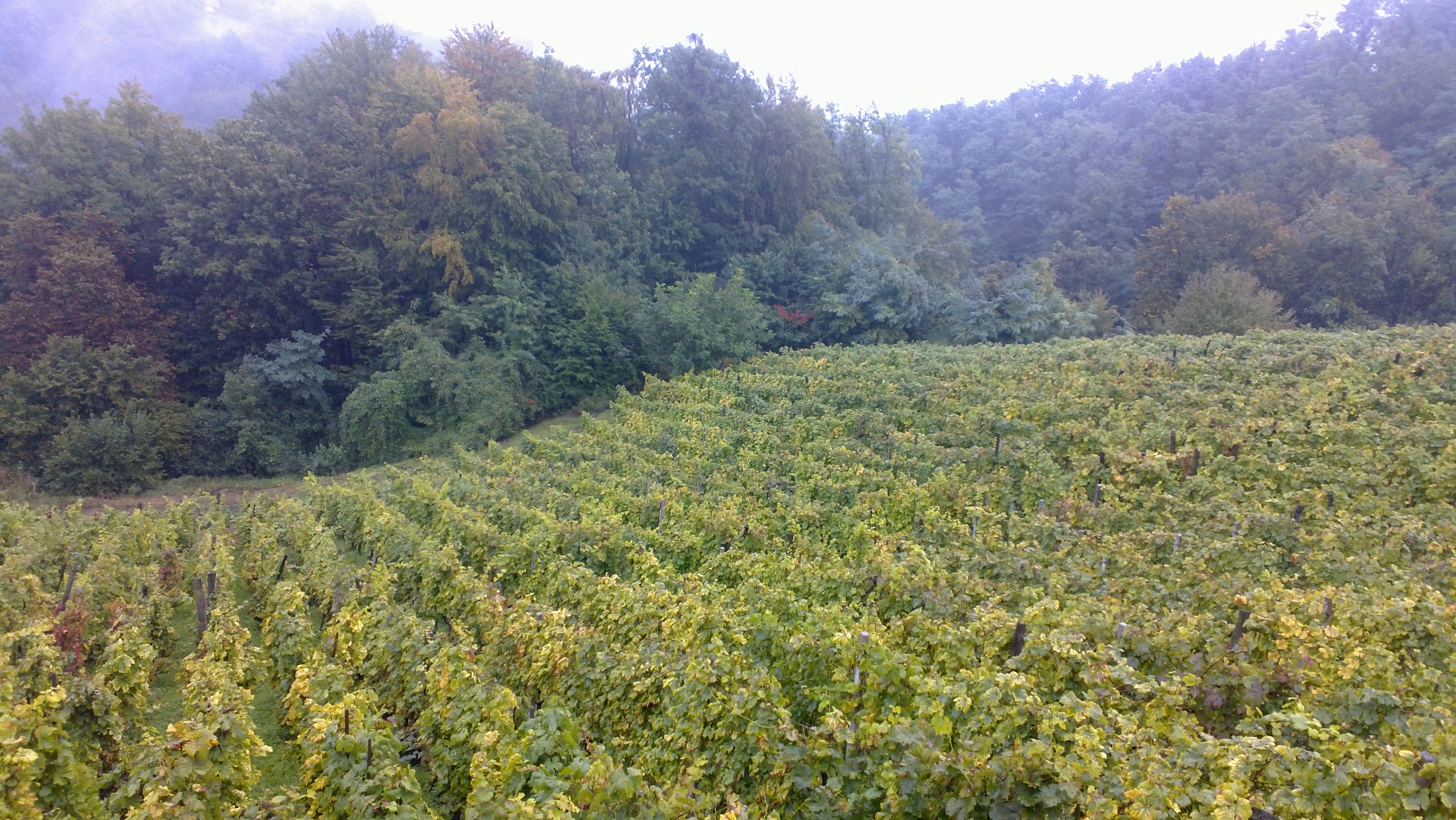
Vineyard in Hrvatsko Zagorje, 2013

The western inland wine region includes the Croatian uplands and is characterized by rolling hills and a cool climate with very cold winters. The sloping vineyards ensure sufficient sun and wind during the growing season, and the wines here display intense aromas and high levels of acidity. Production is concentrated in white wine varieties.

The continental region is divided into the following sub-regions:

Sub-region	Winehills (Vinogorje)
Moslavina	Kutina, Čazma, Voloder-Ivanić Grad
Plešivica	Krašić, Ozalj-Vivodina, Plešivica-Okić, Samobor, Sveta Jana
Pokuplje	Karlovac, Petrinja, Vukomeričke Gorice
Prigorje–Bilogorje	Bilogora, Dugo Selo-Vrbovec, Kalnik, Koprivnica-Đurđevac, Zagreb, Sv. Ivan Zelina
Zagorje–Međimurje	Klanjec, Krapina, Ludbreg, Međimurje, Pregrada, Stubica, Varaždin, Zabok, Zlatar, Zaprešić

=== Coastal Croatia ===
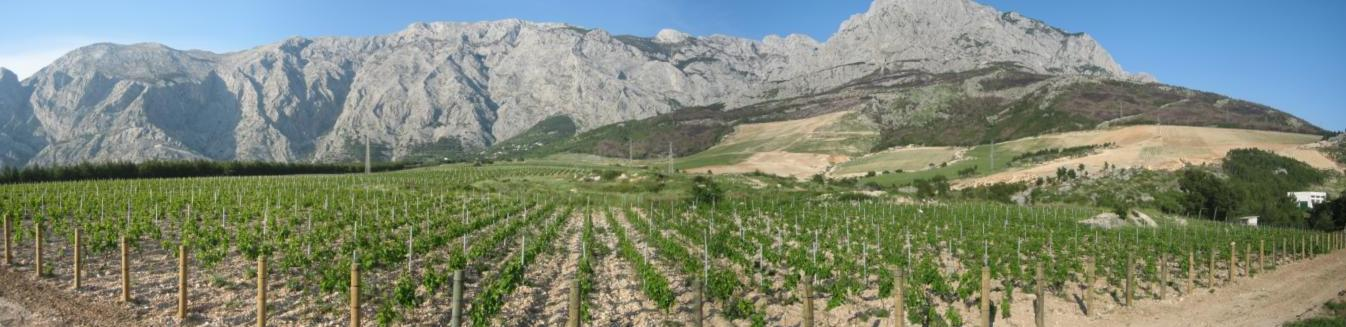
Vineyard in the Makarska region on the slopes of Biokovo, 2009

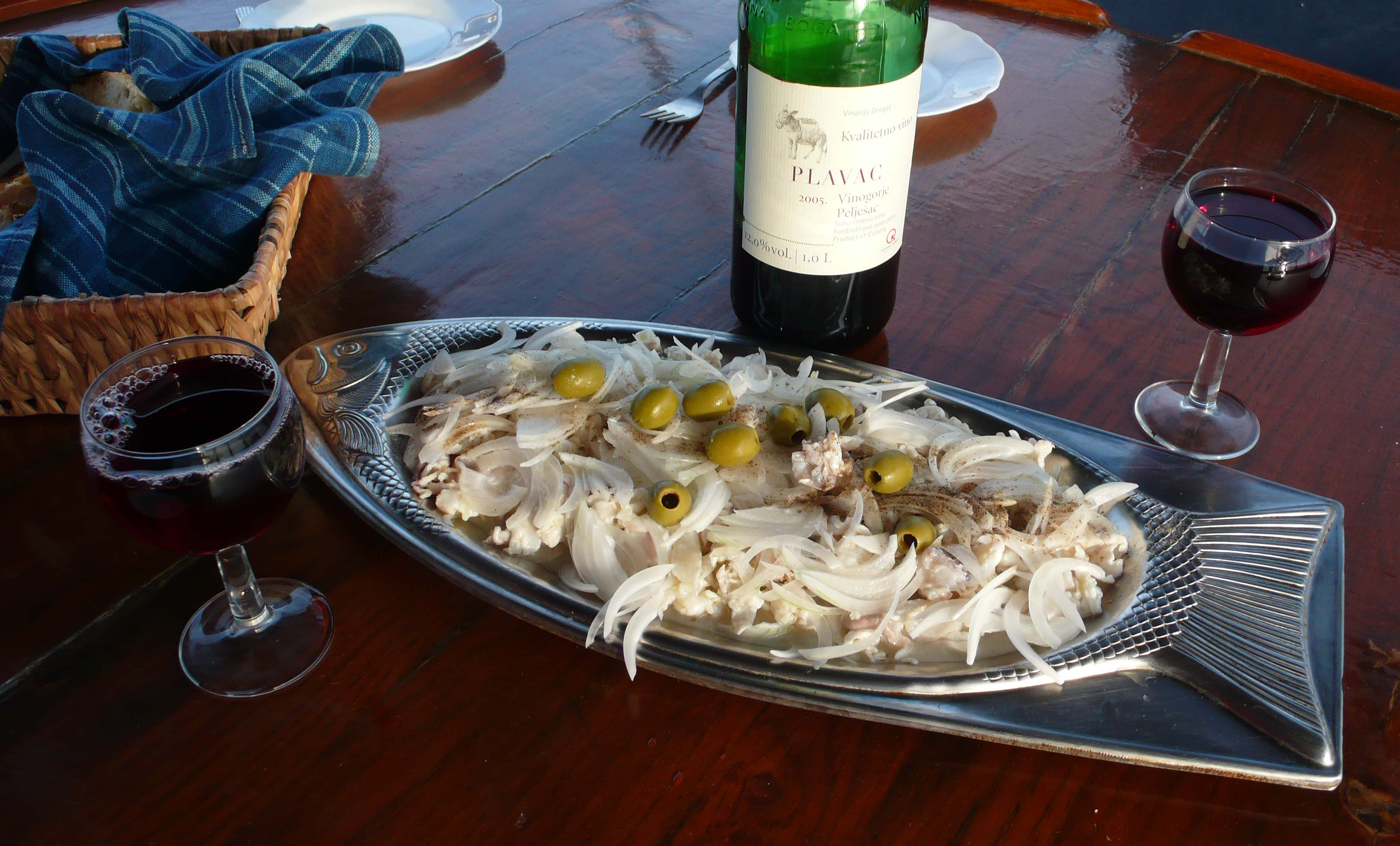
Plavac wine from the Dalmatian region of Croatia, 2007

The coastal wine region runs from Istria in the north to Dalmatia to the south. Due to the widely differing growing conditions, the grape varietals, and the resulting wines, the coastal region is often divided into two parts: Istria/Kvarner and Dalmatia.

Istria and Kvarner are where the warmth of the Mediterranean meets the cold from the Alps, making for a cooler climate than the southern part of the coastal region. A very rich red soil, rich in iron oxides, combined with the mild climate make this area ideal for wine production. In Istria and the north coast, the focus is on fruity, dry white wines from a wide range of grape varieties, but mostly Malvazija, as well as bold, dry reds including Teran.

Istria has a history of viticulture and is one of the oldest wine regions in Europe. The topography of the region is hilly with long coastlines. This means that there is a range of microclimates across the region, allowing for the growth of a range of grape varietals and the production of a diverse catalog of wines. Currently, there is 4000 ha under the vine in Istria. At the end of the 19th century, the area under vine was 44 000 ha but this decreased dramatically after phylloxera struck the region.

Further south, in Dalmatia, with its rocky landscapes, the islands and hillsides have an infinite variety of microclimates resulting in a winegrowing area where terroir is a crucially important factor. A wide range of indigenous grape varietals are grown here, the best known being Plavac Mali, the child of Zinfandel and Dobričić. The coastal region is divided into the following sub-regions (listed from north to south):

Sub-region	Winehills (Vinogorje)
Istria (Istra)	Western Istria (Zapadna Istra), Central Istria (Centralna Istra), Eastern Istria (Istočna Istra)
Croatian Coast or Kvarner (Hrvatsko Primorje)	Opatija-Rijeka-Vinodol, islands Krk, Rab, Cres-Lošinj, Pag
Northern Dalmatia (Sjeverna Dalmacija)	Pirovac-Skradin, Primošten, Šibenik, Zadar-Biograd
Dalmatian Interior (Dalmatinska Zagora)	Benkovac-Stankovci, Skradin, Knin, Promina, Drniš, Imotski, Sinj-Vrlika, Kaštelanska zagora, Vrgorac
Central and South Dalmatia (Srednja i Južna Dalmacija)	Kaštela-Trogir, Split-Omiš-Makarska, Neretva, Komarna, Konavle, Pelješac peninsula, islands Brač, Hvar, Korčula, Lastovo, Mljet, Šolta, Vis

== Grape varieties ==
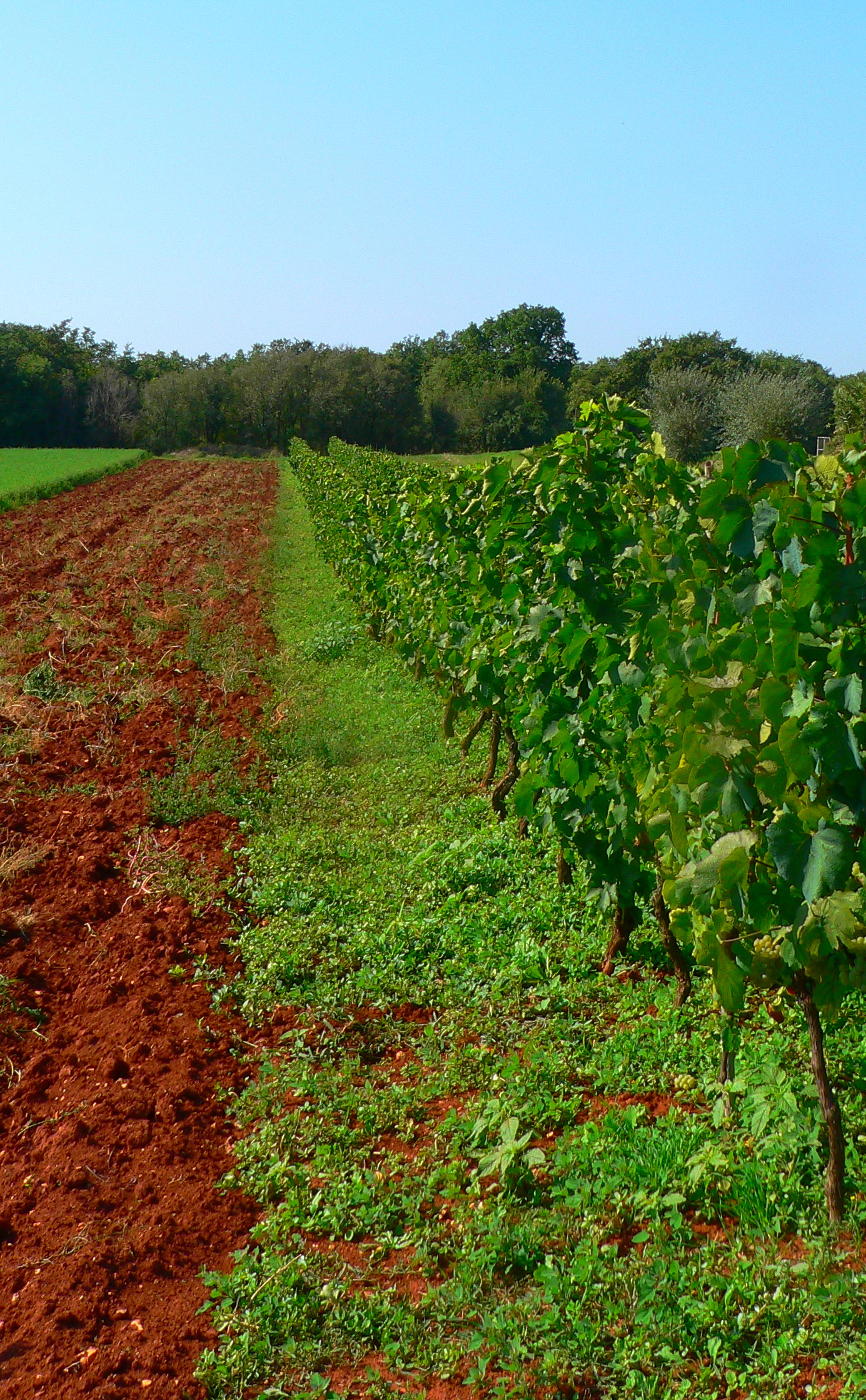
Malvasia vine growing on the red soil of Istria, 2006

The grape varieties in use in Croatia can be very confusing to foreigners, not simply because the Croatian names are unfamiliar, but because many of the varieties may not be in use beyond a very limited area. There are indeed many foreign "international" grape varieties grown in Croatia but its long history of wine production has left it with a rich tradition of indigenous varieties, especially in the more out-lying areas and the more extreme growing conditions. Some of these have been so successful that they are in widespread use within Croatia, yet remain relatively unknown outside the country. One such is Plavac Mali, the foundation of many highly regarded Dalmatian red wines.

The well-known Napa Valley winemaker Miljenko "Mike" Grgich is a Croatian native, and he has argued the case for Zinfandel being descended from the Plavac Mali grape. DNA testing has now demonstrated that Plavac Mali is in fact a child of the true original Zinfandel, which is a little-planted grape from the same area named Crljenak Kaštelanski.

Following the devastation of the vines by phylloxera at the end of the 19th century, Croatian vineyards were replanted by grafting the traditional varieties on to American root stock. Only a very few pre-phylloxera vines still survive today on a couple of the islands (Korčula, and Susak). In recent years, foreign-based winemakers and investors are taking an interest in Croatia's many indigenous grape varieties. As the battle against phylloxera continues, broadening the gene pool may be one way to help prevent a recurrence.

The tables below give an overview of the common varieties, alternative names, and where they are grown.

=== White wine grapes ===
Grape	Origin / other names	Usage
Bogdanuša	Origin: Stari Grad Plain on Hvar	Central and South Dalmatia, especially Hvar
Bratkovina	Origin: Dalmatia	Central & South Dalmatia, mainly Korčula
Cetinjka Bijela		Central & South Dalmatia, especially Korčula, Hvar, Mljet, Peljesac
Chardonnay		Moslavina, Plešivica, Podunavlje, Pokuplje, Prigorje–Bilogora, Slavonia, Zagorje–Međimurje, Istria, Croatian coast, North Dalmatia, Dalmatian interior (everywhere except Central & South Dalmatia)
Debit	Origin: Brought to Dalmatia from Apulia, Italy, but may originate from Anatolia; Also known as pagadebit and puljižanac	North Dalmatia, inland Dalmatia, Central and South Dalmatia
Gegić	Debeljan	Croatian coast, especially islands such as Pag and Rab
Graševina	Origin: May be France. Welschriesling, Laški rizling, Italian Riesling, Olaszriesling	Widely grown throughout the Continental Region. Slavonia produces the largest number of premium quality Graševina wines.
Grk	Origin: Lumbarda on Korčula	Central & South Dalmatia, especially Korčula, Mljet, and Pelješac
Kraljevina	Origin: Zeline, Prigorje	Moslavina, Prigorje–Bilogora, Zagorje-Međimurje
Kujundžuša	Origin: Imotsko Polje. Also known as Kojunđuša, Tvrdac, Tvrdorijez, žutac, ruderuša bijela	Dalmatian interior. Leading white grape variety in Imotski.
Kurtelaška bijela	Indigenous Dalmatian variety	Central & South Dalmatia, esp. Vis and nearby islands. Not widespread and only used in blends.
Malvazija Istarska	Theoretically, Malvasia but more testing is needed	Istria, north Croatian Coast
Malvasia Dubrovačka	Origin: Likely Greece; Italian Malvasia delle Lipari, Malvasia di Sardegna, Greco di Gerace, and Spanish Malvasia de Sitges	Central & South Dalmatia, especially Konavle
Maraština	Origin: Dalmatia or possibly Italy. Also Krizol, Rukatac, Đurđevina, Kačebelić, Kače-debić, Kukuruz, Mareština, Marinkuša	Croatian Coast, North Dalmatia, Central & South Dalmatia, esp. Korčula and Pelješac, Dalmatian Interior
Manzoni bijeli	Incrocio manzoni. Hybrid Pinot blanc/German Riesling	Moslavina, Plešivica, Podunavlje, Prigorje–Bilogora, Slavonia
Moslavac	Origin: possibly Hungary. Also known as šipon, mosler, furmint	Grown throughout the Continental region
Muškat bijeli	Muscat Blanc à Petits Grains	Plešivica, Pokuplje, Prigorje–Bilogora, Zagorje–Međimurje, Istria (dessert wines)
Muškat žuti	Yellow Muscat, Muškat momjanski	Plešivica, Pokuplje, Prigorje–Bilogora, Zagorje–Međimurje, Istria, Croatian Coast (dessert wines)
Muškat ottonel	Muscat Ottonel	Plešivica, Podunavlje, Pokuplje, Slavonia, Zagorje-Međimurje, Istria (dessert wines)
Neuburger	Austrian variety	Plešivica, Pokuplje
Parč	Indigenous to Hvar	Central & South Dalmatia, esp. Hvar
Pinot Bijeli	Pinot blanc	Continental region, Istria, Croatian Coast, Dalmatian Interior
Pinot Sivi	Pinot gris	Continental region, Istria, Croatian Coast, Dalmatian Interior
Plavec Žuti	Old variety from northwest Croatia	Moslavina, Podunavlje, Pokuplje, Prigorje–Bilogora
Pošip	Origin: Smokvica on Korčula.	North Dalmatia, Central & South Dalmatia, Dalmatian islands
(Rajnski) Rizling	German Riesling	Grown throughout Continental region, producing many premium wines
Rizvanac bijeli	Müller-Thurgau	Grown throughout Continental region
Rkatsiteli	Georgian variety	North Dalmatia
Ružica Crvena	Hungarian Dinka	Prigorje, Slavonia
Sauvignon (bijeli)	Sauvignon blanc	Continental region, Istria, Croatian Coast
Silvanac zeleni	Silvaner	Throughout Continental region
Šipelj	Indigenous to northwest Croatia	Pokuplje
Škrlet	Origin: Moslavina	Moslavina, Prigorje–Bilogora
Traminac	Gewürztraminer, Traminac Mirisni	Continental region
Trbljan bijeli	Kuč, Trebbiano romagnolo	Croatian Coast, North Dalmatia, Central & South Dalmatia
Trebbiano toscano		Istria, North Dalmatia, Central & South Dalmatia
Verduzzo		Istria
Vugava	Origin: Vis. bugava, ugava, viškulja	Central & South Dalmatia, esp. Vis
Zelenac	Zelinika	Plešivica, Slavonia, Zagorje–Međimurje
Žilavka	Originates from Herzegovina	Southern Dalmatia
Žlahtina	Origin: Croatian Coast	Istria, Croatian Coast, esp. Krk

=== Red wine grapes ===
Grape	Origin / Other names	Usage
Alicante Bouschet	French hybrid of Grenache and Petit Bouschet	Moslavina, Podunavlje, Prigorje–Bilogora, Istria
Babić	Origin: around Primošten, Dalmatia	Croatian Coast, North Dalmatia, Central & South Dalmatia
Barbera		Istria
Borgonja Crna	Cultivar of Modra Frankinja	Istria
Cabernet Franc		Moslavina, Podunavlje, Prigorje–Bilogora, Slavonia, Istria, North Dalmatia, Central & South Dalmatia
Cabernet Sauvignon		Moslavina, Podunavlje, Prigorje–Bilogora, Slavonia, Istria, Croatian Coast, North Dalmatia, Dalmatian Interior, Central & South Dalmatia
Carignan		North Dalmatia
Crljenak Kaštelanski	Zinfandel, Primitivo, one parent of Plavac Mali	Hvar, Pelješac but rarely grown
Dobričić	Indigenous to Šolta, other parent of Plavac Mali	Central & South Dalmatia, esp. Šolta
Drnekuša	Darnekuša, Drnekuša Crna	Central & South Dalmatia, esp. Hvar
Frankovka	Blaufränkisch, Kékfrankos, Lemberger, Frankonia	Continental Region, Croatian Coast
Gamay bojadiser	Gamay	Moslavina, Prigorje–Bilogora, Zagorje–Međimurje
Grenaš crni	Grenache	North Dalmatia, Dalmatian Interior
Hrvatica	Croatina, Croattina, croatizza. Originates from North Italy	Istria
Jarbola	Related to Hrvatica	Croatian Coast
Lasina	Origin: north Dalmatia	North Dalmatia
Lovrijenac	St Laurent	Moslavina, Plešivica, Pokuplje, Prigorje–Bilogora, Zagorje–Međimurje
Merlot		Podunavlje, Pokuplje, Prigorje–Bilogora, Slavonia, Istria, Croatian Coast, North Dalmatia, Dalmatian Interior, Central & South Dalmatia
Muškat ruža crni	Moscato delle rose nero, Muscat des roses noir, Rosenmuskateller blauer	Istria, Central & South Dalmatia
Nebbiolo	Italy	Croatian Coast
Ninčuša	Indigenous to Dalmatia	Dalmatian Interior, Central & South Dalmatia
Okatac	ružica crvena, glavinuša	Dalmatian Interior, Central & South Dalmatia
Pinot crni	Burgundac crni, Pinot noir	Continental Region, Istria, Croatian Coast
Plavac Mali	Origin: central and south Dalmatia. Pagadebit	Dalmatian Interior, Central & South Dalmatia
Plavina	Origin: Dalmatia. Plavka, Plajka, Brajda, Brajdica	Istria, Croatian Coast, North Dalmatia, Central & South Dalmatia
Portugizac	Blauer Portugieser, Austria	Continental Region
Refošk	Refosco Origin: Italy.	Istria
Susac Crni	Sansigot, sujćan, tvardo grozje, sanseg, Sušćan crni	North Dalmatia esp Susac, Lošinj, Cres, and the Kvarner Island region
Svrdlovina crna	Galica	North Dalmatia
Syrah	Shiraz	Slavonia, Istria, Croatian Coast, North Dalmatia, Dalmatian Interior
Teran	Terrano	Istria
Tocai Friulano		Istria
Trnjak	Rudežuša	Dalmatian Interior, Central & South Dalmatia
Vranac	Vranec	North Dalmatia
Zadarka crna		North Dalmatia
Zweigelt		Continental Region

== Classification ==
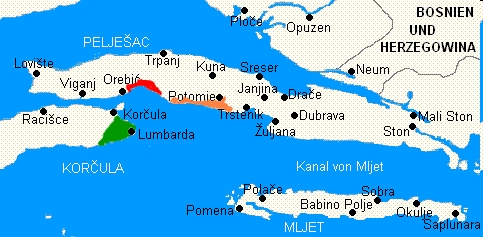
The hills of Dingač (orange) and Postup (red) on Pelješac and Grk (green) on Korčula produce some of Croatia's best wines

Areas of Teran growing regions in Croatia, Italy and Slovenia

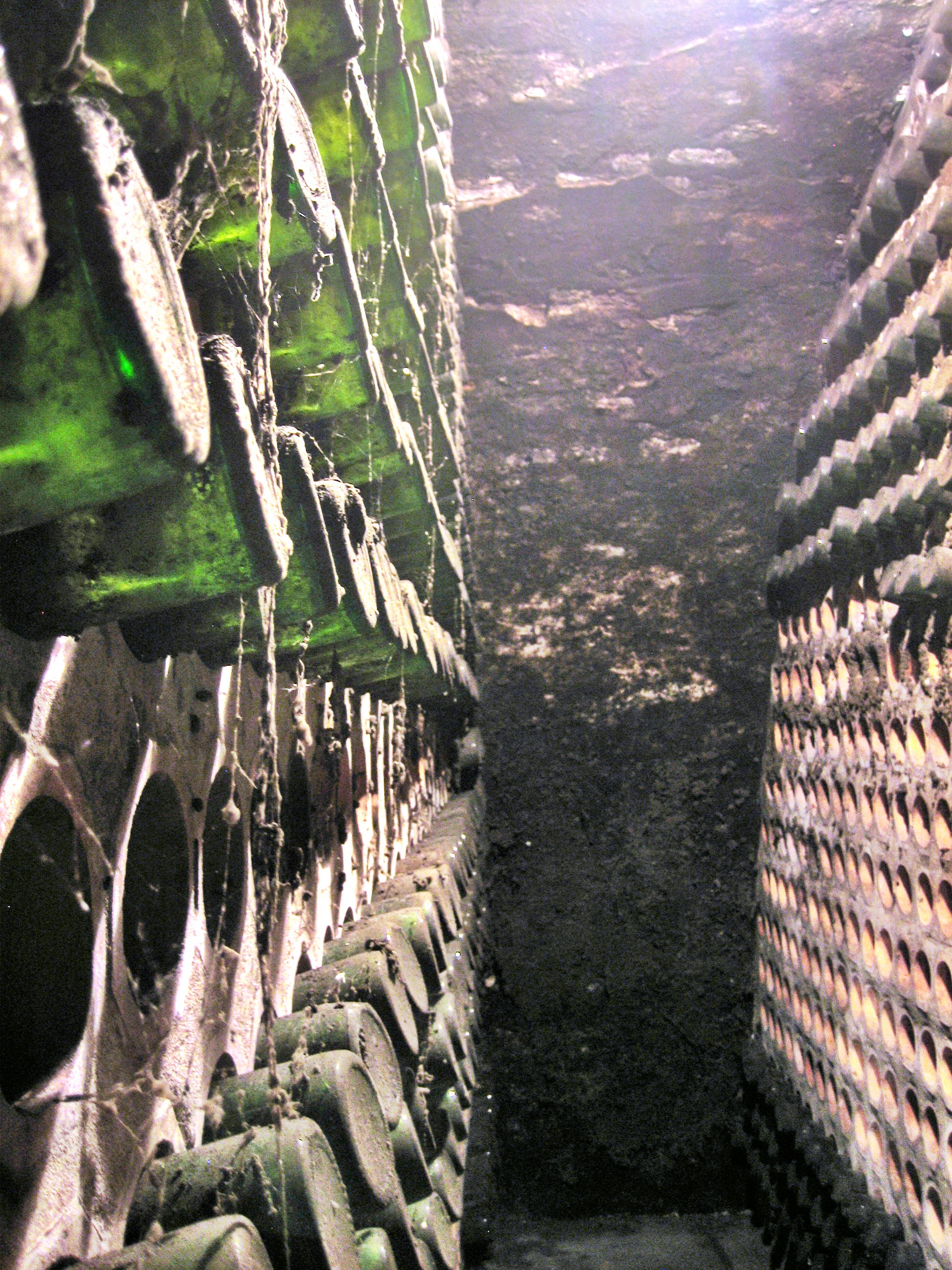
Wine Cellar in Kneževi Vinogradi, Baranja, 2008

In 1961, Dingač and then, in 1967, Postup were registered for Yugoslav state protection.

The Croatian Institute of Viticulture and Enology was set up in 1996 to oversee the country's wine industry, and be responsible for regulating winegrowing and wine production. Standards, similar to the EU wine regulations, were set up to ensure the consistent quality of the final product. Croatian wines are classified by quality, which is clearly marked on the label.

- Vrhunsko Vino: Premium Quality Wine
- Kvalitetno Vino: Quality Wine
- Stolno Vino: Table Wine

In addition, wines may qualify for a geographical origin stamp, if it is produced from grapes grown in the same winegrowing region. The definition becomes stricter for higher-quality classifications, so that a premium quality wine with geographical origin stamp must meet criteria for the type of grape, the position in the vinogorije (winegrowing hill) with the distinct quality and characteristics for the variety. If the wine has a grape varietal stamp, it must be at least 85% of the grape type whose name it carries. Distinctive quality wines have a special quality, attained in certain years, in special conditions of maturation, manner of harvesting and processing, and must be produced only from the recommended sorts of grape for the particular winegrowing hills.

Wines qualifying for a vintage designation, known as Arhiv, must be kept in cellar conditions longer than its optimal maturation period, and not less than 5 years from the day of processing grape into wine, of which at least 3 years in a bottle.

- Suho: Dry
- Polusuho: Semi-dry
- Slatko: Sweet
- Bijelo: White
- Crno: Red (literally Black)
- Rosa: Rosé
- Prošek: Dalmatian dessert wine made from dried grapes, similar to Italian Vin Santo

Despite these various classifications systems, Croatian wines don't have a DO or AOC system like Spain, Italy, or France, which can make it confusing to understand a wine's grade or origin.

== Wine production ==
Wine production in Croatia
Year	Quantity (thousands of hl)
2003	1,265
2004	1,204
2005	1,248
2006	1,237
2007	1,365
2008	1,278
2009	1,424
2010	1,433
2011	1,409
2012	1,293
2013	1,249
2014	842
2015	992
2016	760

As of 2018, the five largest wine producers are:

1. Iločki podrumi (Ilok)
2. Agrolaguna (Poreč)
3. Kutjevo d.d. (Kutjevo)
4. Belje d.d. (Darda)
5. Erdutski vinogradi (Erdut)

== Acknowledgements ==
At the Decanter World Wine Awards 2023, 360 Croatian wines in total received gold, silver, and bronze medals.

49 Croatian wines scored more than 90 points (out of 100) by Wine Enthusiast magazine during 2022 and 2023.

== See also ==
- Beer in Croatia
- Croatian cuisine
- Agriculture in Croatia
- Culture of Croatia
- Winemaking

== Sources ==
- Sokolić, Ivan (April 2012). "Kratka priča o hrvatskom vinogradarstvu i vinarstvu" [A Short History of Croatian Viticulture and Winemaking] (PDF). Acta Turistica Nova (in Croatian and English). 6 (1): 21–26.
