= Agawam =

Agawam may refer to:

== People ==
- Agawam people, Native Americans inhabiting the coast of New England encountered by English colonists who arrived in the early 17th century

== Places ==
All located in the United States

- Agawam, Kentucky, an unincorporated community
- Agawam, Massachusetts, a city
  - Agawam, early name of Ipswich, Massachusetts, during the 17th century
  - Agawam Plantation, early name of Springfield, Massachusetts, when first settled in 1636
- Agawam, Montana, an unincorporated community
- Agawam, Oklahoma, a ghost town

== Rivers ==
- Agawam River, in southeastern Massachusetts
- Westfield River, in western Massachusetts, the lower parts of which were formerly known as the Agawam River

== Other uses ==
- USS Agawam (disambiguation), several ships of the United States Navy
- Agawam (grape), a hybrid grape variety and one of the so-called Rogers' Hybrids
