= Agawa =

Agawa may refer to:

- Agawa (surname)
- Agawa District, Kōchi, Japan
  - Agawa, Kōchi, a village in Agawa District
- Agawa River, a river in Ontario, Canada
- Agawa Canyon, a canyon in Ontario, Canada

== See also ==
- Agaw people, in the Horn of Africa
  - Agaw languages, spoken by the Agaw
- Agawam (disambiguation)
