= Requa (grape) =

Variety of grape

Requa is one of the lesser known members of the collection of grape varieties known as Rogers' Hybrids, created by Edward S. Rogers of Salem, Massachusetts in the mid-19th century, and is the result of a cross of Carter, a selection of Vitis labrusca, and Black Hamburg (there are two varieties known by this name, but in this case it was probably Schiava Grossa), a selection of Vitis vinifera. It was originally known as Rogers No. 28, until Rogers named it after a James Augustus Requa, agent for Thomas Lake Harris' utopian winegrowing community of 'Salem-on-Erie' at Brocton, New York. Requa is female, and thus requires a second grape variety as a pollen source. Fruit is a dark red, ripens late, and is prone to rot.
