= Postup (wine) =

Postup is a Croatian premium quality red wine produced of the plavac Mali crni grape variety in a limited homonymous area of the Pelješac subregion of the Middle and South Dalmatia wine growing region.

At about 50 ha of the locality Postup, in a good year it is possible to produce about 34,000-40,000 t of grapes (the harvest yield being at most 60%), that is about 2,400 hl of the premium wine postup. In fact, a good year is one when due to the specific microclimatic conditions a part of the grapes of the variety plavac Mali crni grown at this locality (as well as at the locality called Dingač) over-ripe so that there are about 30% of dry berries, increasing the sugar content and making conditions to produce many other ingredients of importance for the quality of the future wine.

Postup wine is characterized by a high content of ethanol (often over 14% vol.) and dry extract (over 30 g/L). The wine has a purple - dark red color with blue reflections, as well as a pleasant and unique fragrance and bouquet. It has always been highly priced at the market and used to be sold as much as four times more expensive than other Dalmatian red wines (apart from dingač, a wine postup is difficult to distinguish from). Postup is classified as the highest standard recognized by the Croatian law - "Vrhunsko Vino" ("Premium Quality Wine"). It was the second wine (after dingač) protected as "Premium Quality" (1967).
