= Goethe (grape) =

Grape variety; one of "Rogers' Hybrids"

- Grape (Vitis)
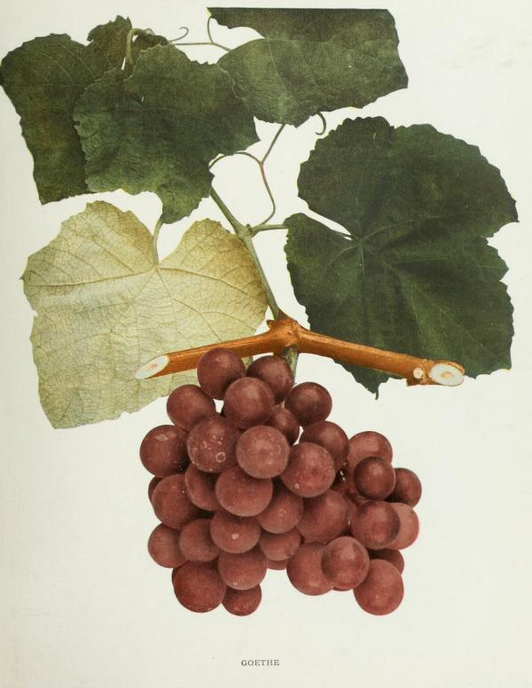
- Illustration of Goethe grapes from the 1908 book The Grapes of New York
- Color of berry skin: Rose
- Also called: Rogers No. 1
- Sex of flowers: Female
- VIVC number: 4851

Goethe is one of the collection of grape varieties known as Rogers' Hybrids, created by Edward Staniford Rogers of Salem, Massachusetts, in the mid-19th century, and is the result of a cross of Carter, a selection of Vitis labrusca, and Black Hamburg (there are two varieties known by this name, but in this case it was probably Schiava Grossa), a selection of Vitis vinifera. It was originally known as Rogers No. 1, until Rogers named it after Johann Wolfgang Goethe, the German author, artist, and scientist.

Goethe is female, and thus requires a second grape variety as a pollen source. Fruit is a pale red, ripens late, and is prone to rot. Hedrick considered it the most vinifera-like of the Rogers' Hybrids, but while of high quality, it rarely reaches full maturity in shorter-seasoned climates, and only achieved a measure of popularity in the Mid-Atlantic and Mid-West United States.
