= Herbert (grape) =

Variety of grape

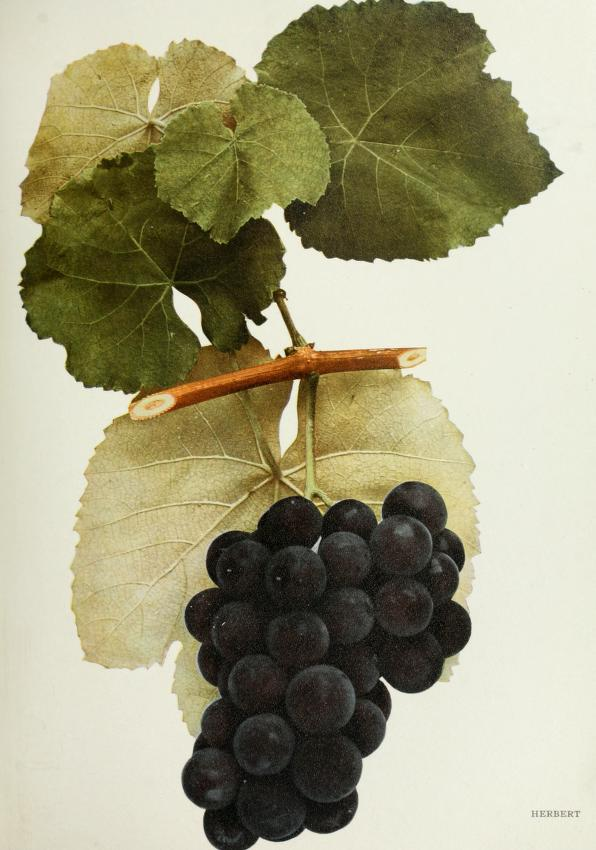
- Photographic plate of Herbert grape from the book The Grapes of New York, 1908 by Ulysses Prentiss Hedrick

Herbert is one of the collection of grape varieties known as Rogers' Hybrids, created by Edward Staniford Rogers (of Salem, Massachusetts,) in the mid-19th century, and is the result of a cross of Carter, a selection of Vitis labrusca, and Black Hamburg (there are two varieties known by this name, but in this case it was probably Schiava Grossa), a selection of Vitis vinifera. It was originally known as Rogers No. 44.

Herbert is female, and thus requires a second grape variety as a pollen source. Even then, Herbert tends towards straggly, poorly filled clusters. The black fruit ripens with Concord and keeps well. Although never extensively cultivated, it was a favorite of amateurs in the late 19th century and early 20th century. Hedrick considered the quality, at its best, to rival that of its vinifera parent.
