= Chetek (YTB-827) =

Harbor Tug of United States Navy

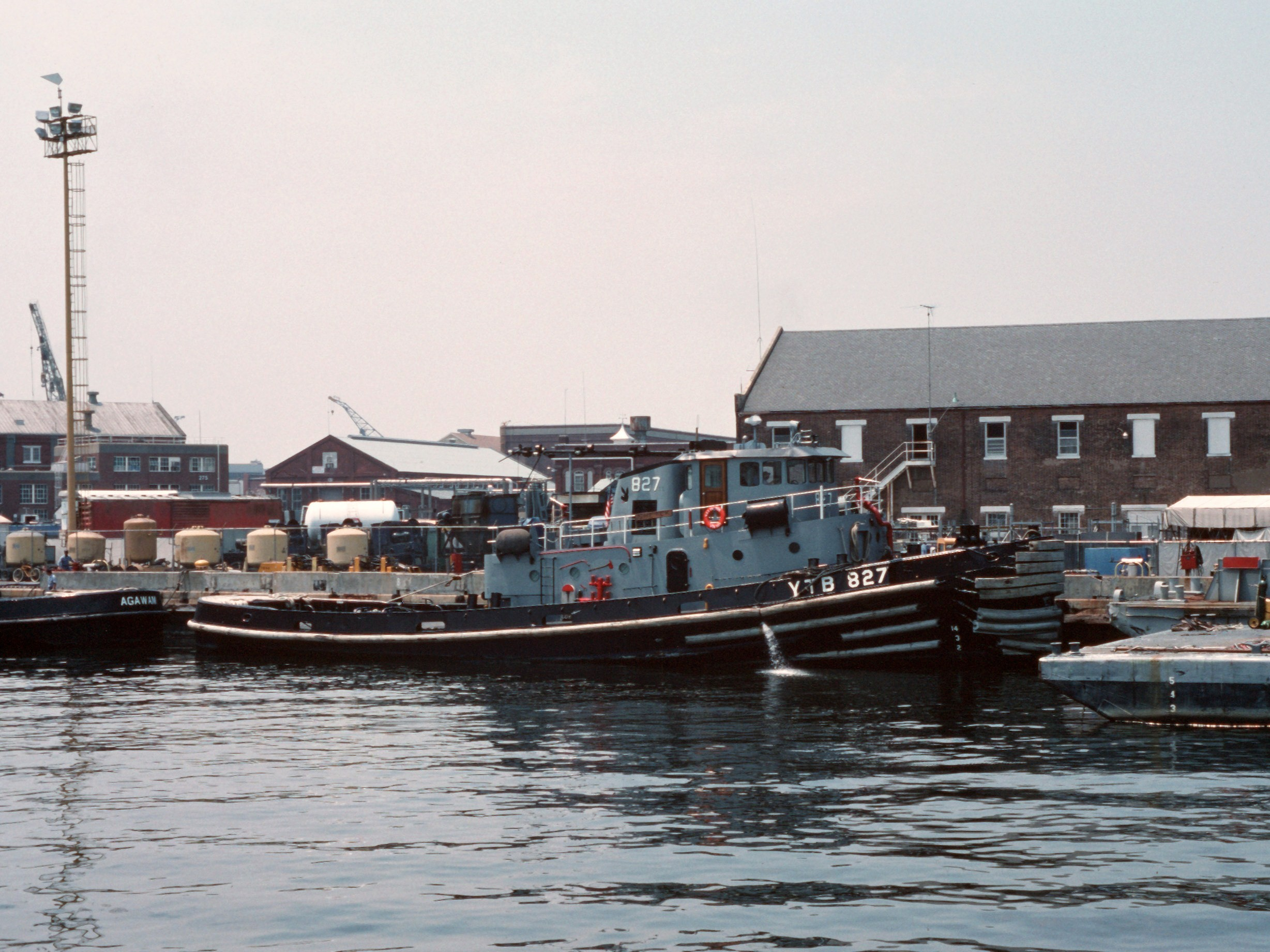
- Chetek (YTB-827) tied up at Norfolk Naval Shipyard, Portsmouth, VA., 7 July 1988. Agawam (YTB-809) is astern of Chetek.

History

United States
- Awarded: 9 August 1971
- Builder: Marinette Marine, Marinette, Wisconsin
- Laid down: 21 May 1973
- Launched: 25 October 1973
- In service: 8 December 1973
- Stricken: 29 February 1996
- Identification: IMO number: 8654247; MMSI number: 367393840; Callsign: WDER746
- Fate: Transferred to the US Army of Corps of Engineers, Buffalo, N.Y., 1 March 1996

General characteristics
- Class & type: Natick-class large harbor tug
- Displacement: 286 long tons (291 t) (light); 346 long tons (352 t) (full)
- Length: 109 ft (33 m)
- Beam: 31 ft (9.4 m)
- Draft: 14 ft (4.3 m)
- Speed: 12 knots (14 mph; 22 km/h)
- Complement: 12
- Armament: None

Chetek (YTB-827) was a United States Navy Natick-class large harbor tug named for Chetek, Wisconsin.

== Construction ==
The contract for Chetek was awarded 9 August 1971. She was laid down on 5 May 1973 at Marinette, Wisconsin, by Marinette Marine and launched 25 October 1973.

== Operational history ==
Chetek served as a tug in the 5th Naval District at Norfolk, VA. Stricken from the Navy List 29 February 1996, Chetek was transferred to the US Army of Corps of Engineers, Buffalo, N.Y., 1 March 1996.

Chetek's fate is unclear. Navsource indicates that ex-Chetek was renamed Demelon. Further, she is listed for sale as of 2007. Another source indicates that ex-Chetek was renamed Chetek and at some point sold to Basic Towing, Inc. and renamed Nickelena.
