= Babić (grape) =

Native Croatian red wine grape

- Grape (Vitis)
- Color of berry skin: Red
- Notable regions: Dalmatia, Croatia
- VIVC number: 844

Wine characteristics
- Medium climate: Plum, figs
- Hot climate: Tobacco

Babić is a native Croatian red wine grape common to the Northern Dalmatia region. Typically grown in and around the towns of Šibenik and Primošten, it can also be found on some Croatian islands such as Korčula. While officially listed as a National Cultivar in Croatia (NN 159/04), the name of this grape is also a common Croatian family name.

== History ==
Like many grapes in Croatia, the history behind Babić is largely unknown other than the fact it has been actively grown in the Northern Dalmatian region for hundreds of years. One theory is that it is a localized clone of Dobričić. Another suggests that it is connected to Dobričić via a parent/offspring relationship. Until more genetic testing has concluded, it will not be known for certain.

== Characteristics ==
The wine produced from this grape is dark and thick. It typically has a high degree of tannins as well as alcohol. Higher-end versions of the grape are thought to be able to age well.

Wines that are typically considered to be of the highest vrhunsko grade are made from the grapes that grow on the historic stone terraces that surround Primošten.

== Synonyms ==
Given the far-flung spread of this grape along the coast of Croatia, a great number of synonyms have arisen, including Babic Crni, Babic Mali, Babic Pivati, Babic Pluskavi, Babic Veliki, Babica, Babica Crni, Babica Gresljivka Crni, Babica Mala, Babica Vela, Babica Velika, Babicevic, Babicevica, Babinka Vela, Babić, Babičević, Babytch, Crnac Rani, Grastavac, Gresljivka, Pazanin, Pažanin, Rogoznicanin, Roguljanac, Roguljanak, Sibencanac, and Šibenčanac.
