= Massasoit (grape) =

Variety of grape

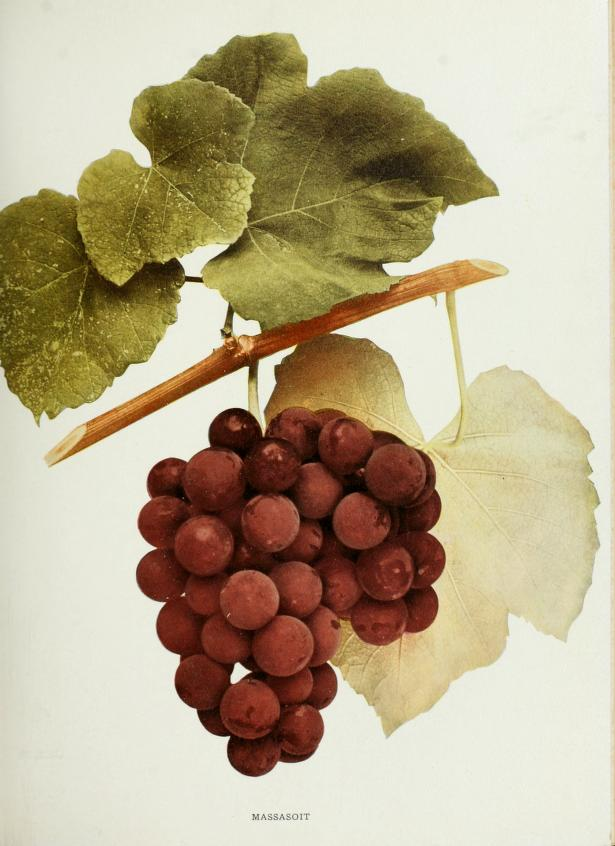
- Photographic plate of Massasoit grape from the book The Grapes of New York, 1908 by Ulysses Prentiss Hedrick

Massasoit is one of the collection of hybrid grape varieties known as Rogers' Hybrids, created by E.S. Rogers of Salem, Massachusetts, in the mid-19th century, and is the result of a cross of Carter, a selection of Vitis labrusca, and Black Hamburg (there are two varieties known by this name, but in this case it was probably Schiava Grossa), a selection of Vitis vinifera. It was originally known as Rogers No. 3, but in 1869 Rogers named it after a prominent Native American chief from early Massachusetts history, Ousamequin, who used the title Massasoit.

Massasoit is female, and thus requires a second grape variety as a pollen source for full fruit set. However unlike many female-flowered grapes, if left unpollinated the variety will often set a number of small, seedless grapes, so consistently that the variety circulated for many years under the name Williams Seedless. Fruit is a dark brown-red, and ripens earlier than any of the other Rogers' Hybrids, though considered by many to be inferior to that of the others. Ulysses Prentiss Hedrick, in Grapes of New York, stated that the fruit is at its best before it fully ripens, acquiring an unpleasant degree of foxiness if allowed to hang on the vine too long. Massasoit is rarely, if ever, cultivated today, but it enjoyed some popularity as an early table grape in the late 19th century.
