= Teran grape =

Variety of grape

- Grape (Vitis)
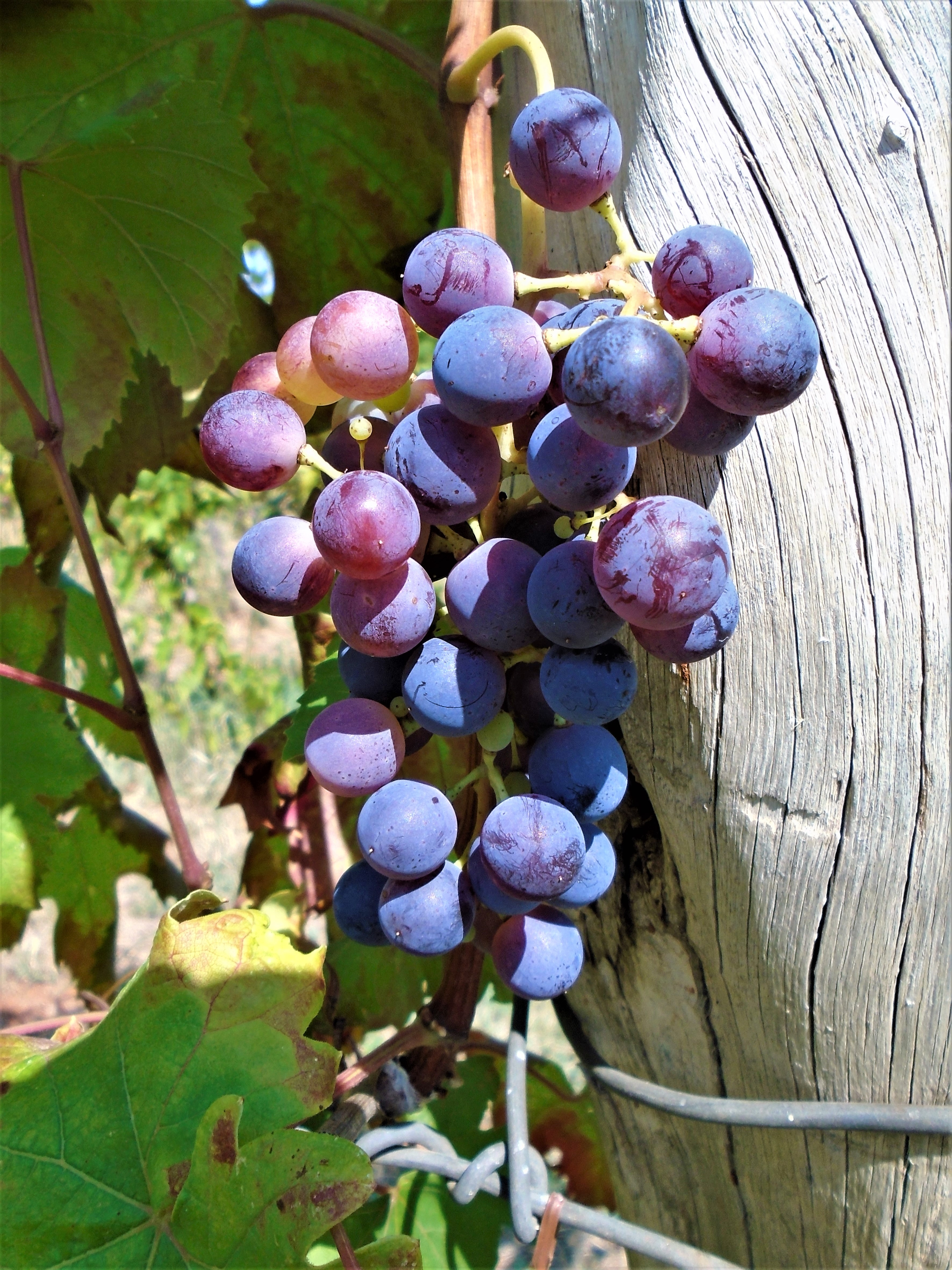
- Teran grape ripening at Novigrad, Istria County
- Color of berry skin: Noir
- Species: Vitis vinifera
- Origin: Croatia
- Notable regions: Istria
- Notable wines: Teran - Hrvatska Istra (Croatian Istria)
- Hazards: sensitive to strong sun and excessive humidity
- VIVC number: 12374

Teran grape growing area

Teran grape is a variety of red grape from Istria, Croatia. It is mostly found in western part of Istria. It is a late-ripening variety and grows in large clusters with densely packed berries. Berries have highly resistant skin and deep ruby red color. The vine requires a lot of sun but less water. It is sensitive, both to extremely strong sun (burning hazard) and to excessive humidity (botrytis). When the grapes are fully ripe and all other needed conditions are met, a very good quality red wine can be made from them. Its alcohol content is usually between 11 and 14%.

== History ==
Teran has been grown in the Istrian peninsula for centuries. According to some sources, it has been part of Istria's identity for more than 650 years. At the end of the 19th century it was planted approximately on 90% of all vineyards in Istria and hence was the most widespread grape variety in Istria. Today it still remains the most common red grape variety in the region covering around 400 hectares. It is protected by the delegated act on wine labels of the European Commission in 2017.

== Wine ==
Teran wine is traditionally produced from teran grapes. It is considered as one of the highest quality red wines on the market, having rich and robust character. The wine is known for its persistency and slightly higher acidity than other similar wines and is best served at about 18 degrees Celsius.

The quality of the wine can depend on the location as well as on the conditions in the vineyard. Its colour is ruby-red, almost purple, and it has high tannins and a typical, fruity aroma which is easy to recognize. Different yeast type can influence the quality of teran wine as well. Teran wine differs from Kraški teran wine (Italian: Terrano del Carso), which is produced from Refošk (Italian: Refosco) grape variety, grown in Istrian hinterland.

== Gallery ==
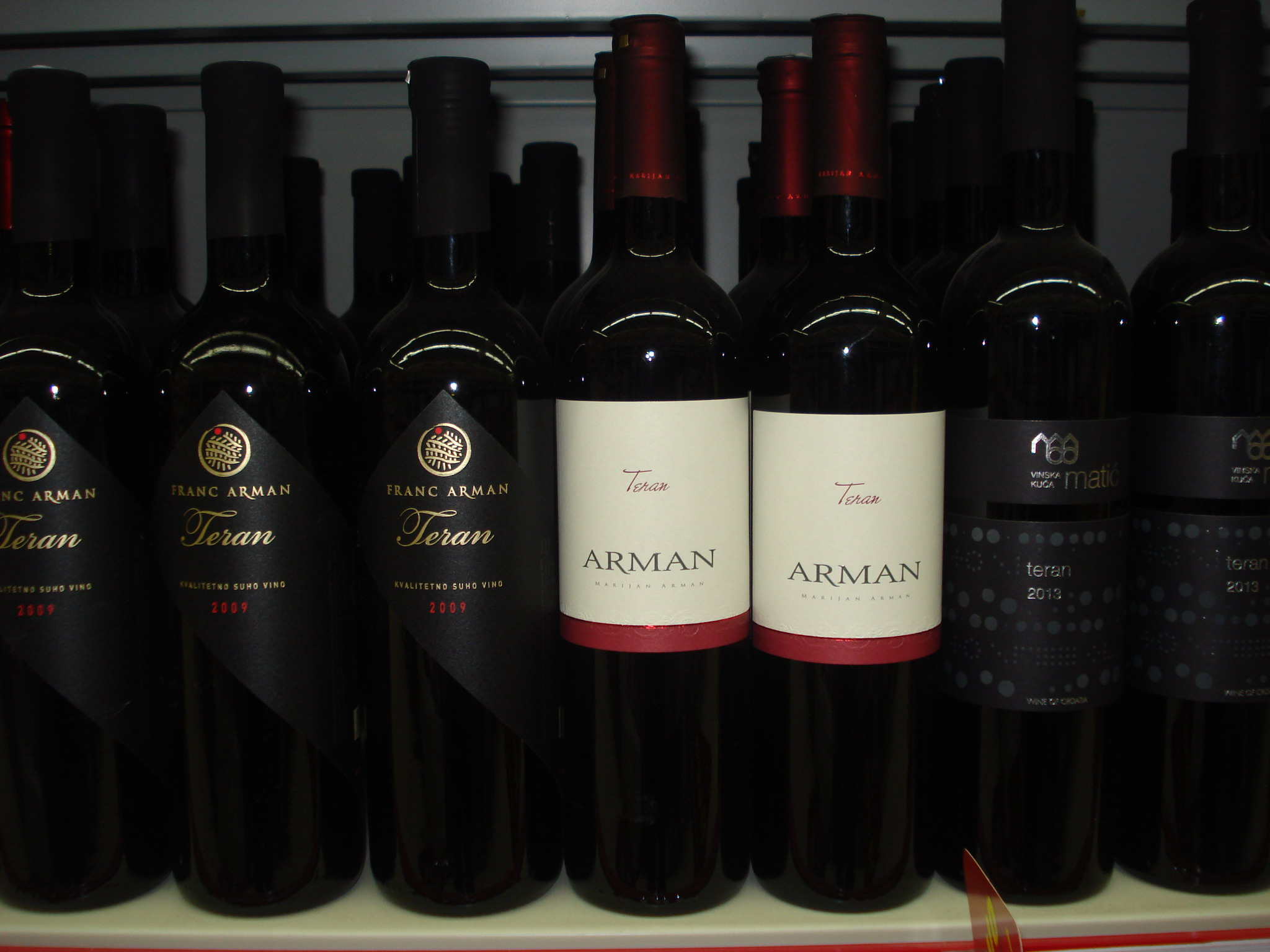
2009 vintage

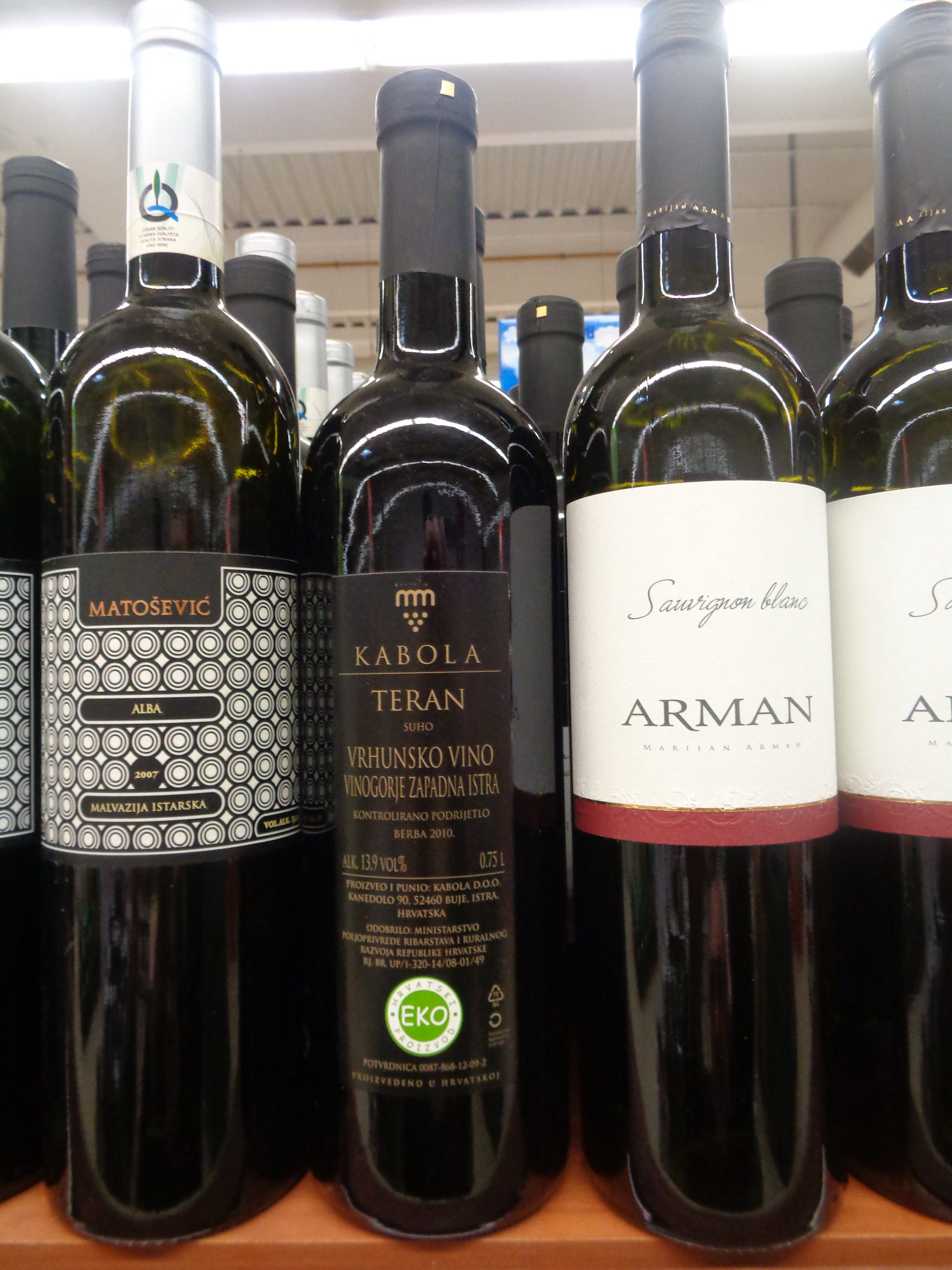
2010 vintage

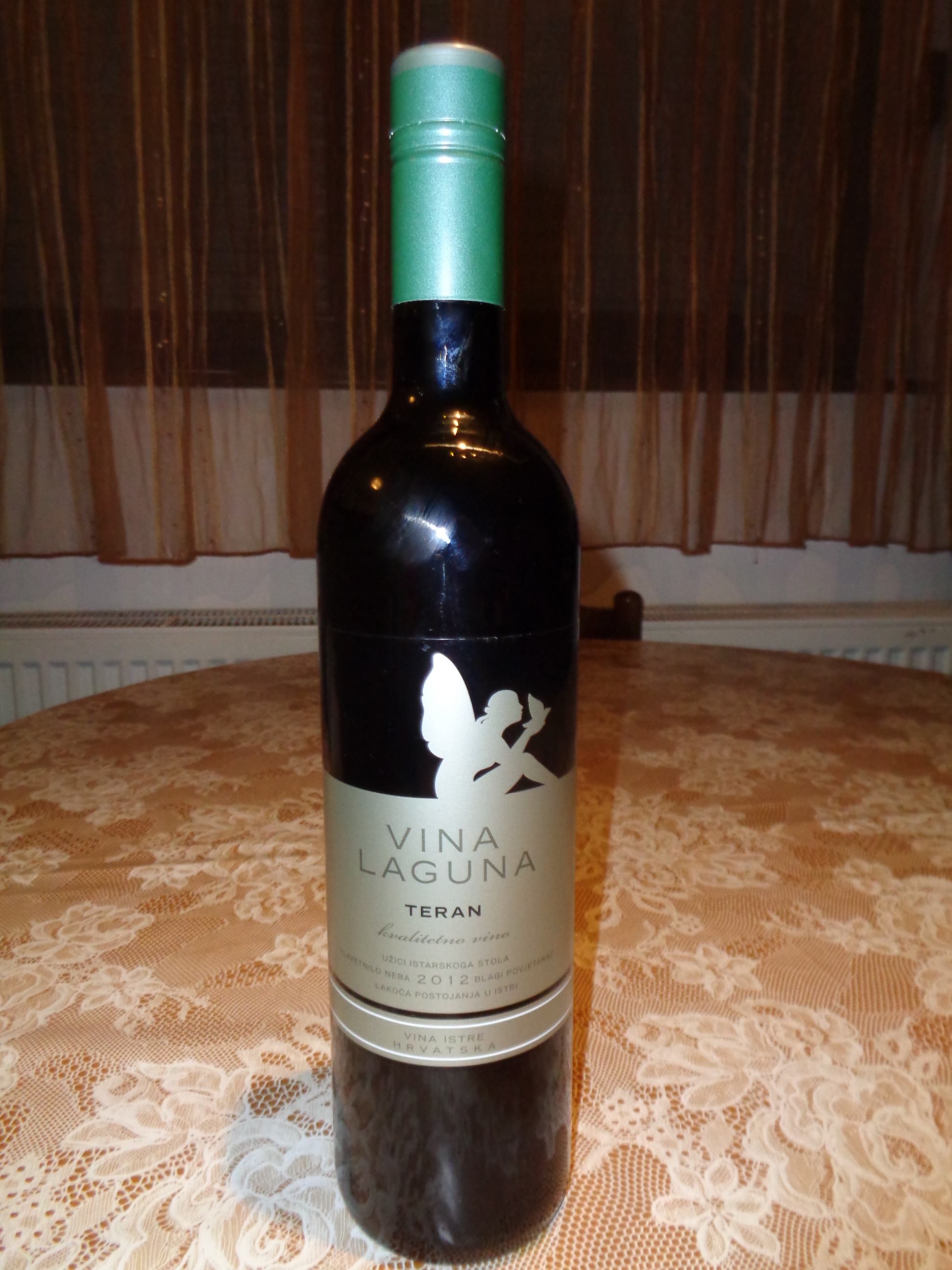
2012 vintage

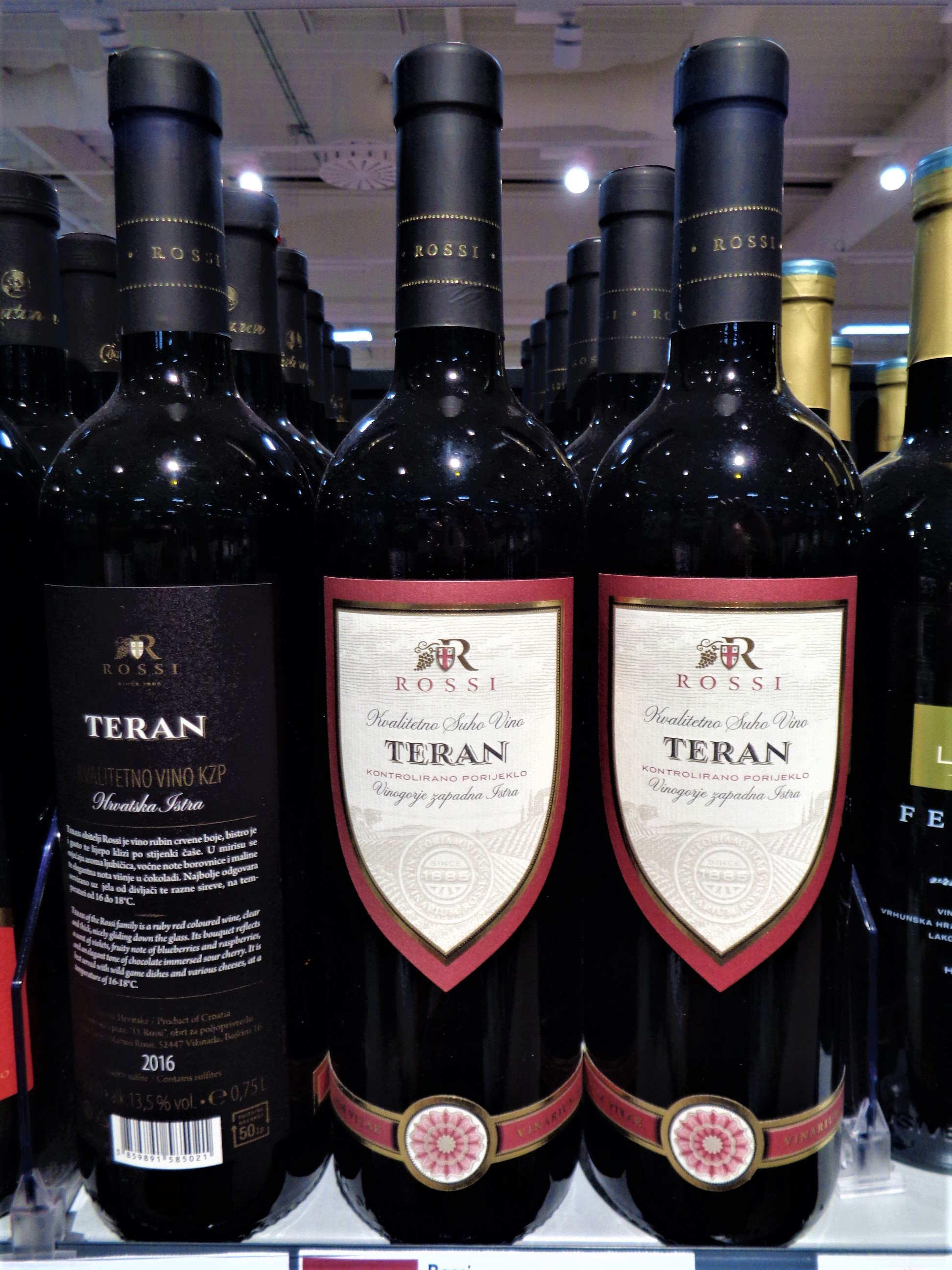
2016 vintage

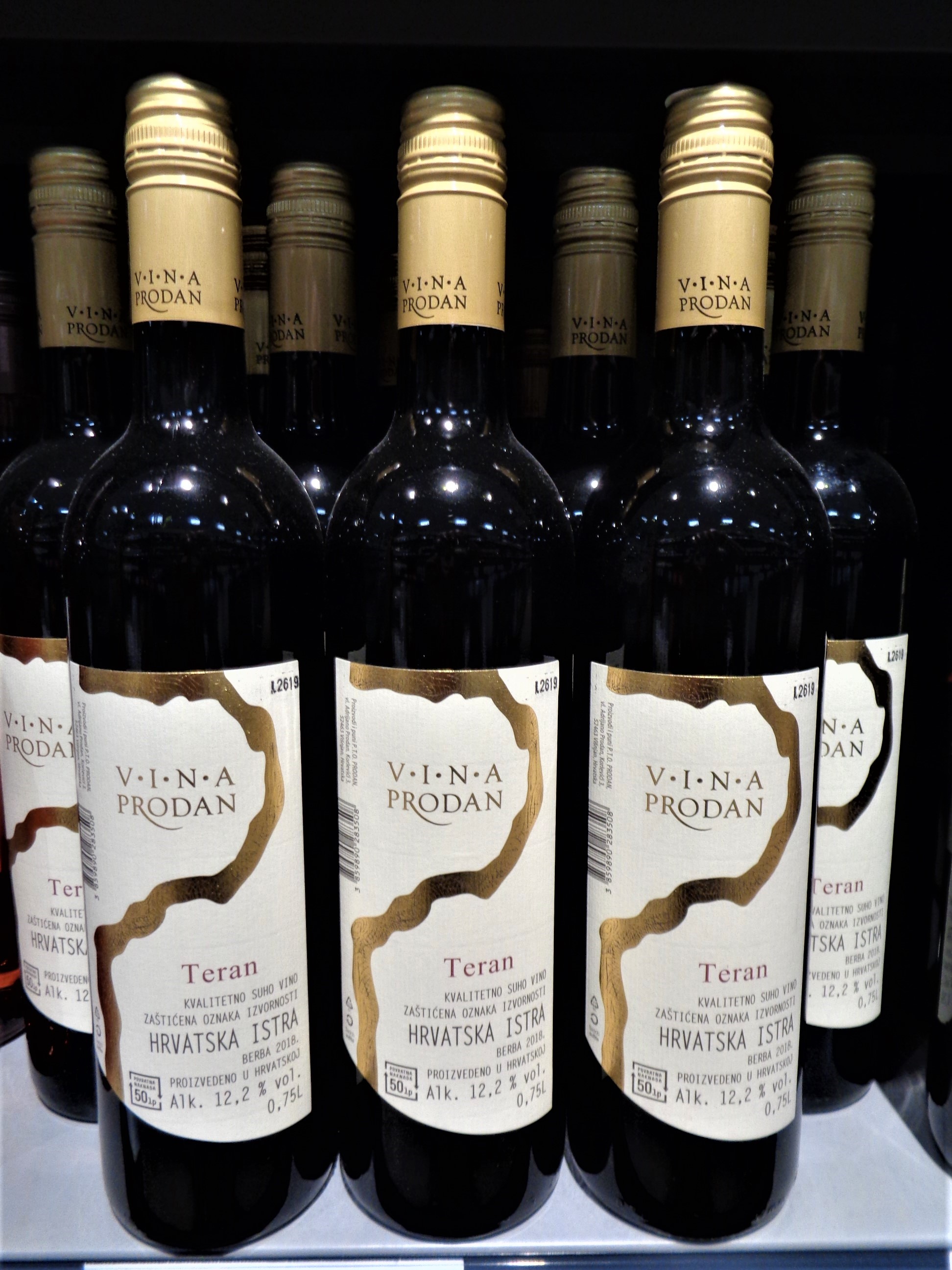
2018 vintage

== See also ==
- List of grape varieties
- Croatian wine
