= Agawam (grape) =

Variety of grape

- Grape (Vitis)
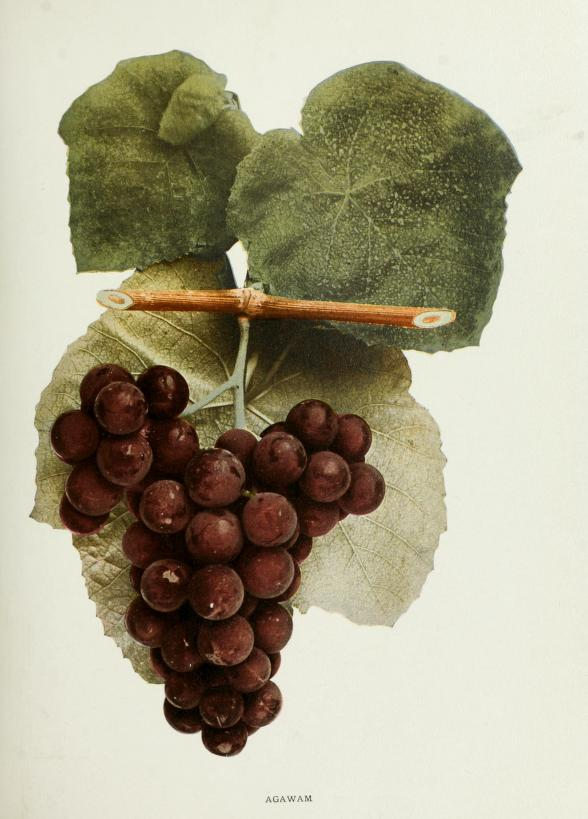
- Color of berry skin: Rouge
- Species: Interspecific crossing with Vitis vinifera and Vitis labrusca in its pedigree
- Also called: Rogers 15
- VIVC number: 94

Agawam (or Rogers 15) is a hybrid grape variety. It is a crossing of Carter (another hybrid grape with Vitis labrusca and Vitis vinifera in its pedigree) and Muscat Hamburg (a Vitis vinifera cultivar). Agawam is one of the so-called Rogers' Hybrids created by E.S. Rogers of Salem, Massachusetts, in the early-to-mid-19th century, and is unique among the named cultivars of that group in that it is self-fertile.

It can be used to make a rosé wine having a "foxy" flavor.

== Synonyms ==
Agawam is also called Agavam, Rogers 15, and Rogers' Hybrid Nr. 15.

== See also ==
- List of grape varieties
