= Drnekuša =

Variety of grape

- Grape (Vitis)
- Color of berry skin: Red
- Notable regions: Dalmatia, Croatia

Drnekuša is an ancient red wine grape variety from the Dalmatian coast in Croatia. Rarely found, when it is grown, it is typically blended with Plavac Mali, giving a deep, ruby coloration typically to when Syrah is used as a blend. On the island of Hvar, one winery will sometimes release a wine that is 100% Drnekuša but only when the growing season is the most optimal.

A bisexual flower, Drnekuša starts producing in its third year of growth. It prefers deep, fertile, permeable soils to grow in, such as those found in the Stari Grad Plain. Its resistance to mildew and mold is very weak and as such, the vines need to planted in a warm climate. This also results in the grape having a thin skin that breaks easily.

== Synonyms ==
Due to Croatian dialectic shifts, the grape is also known as Drnekuša crna, Dernekuša, Darnekuša (on Hvar Island), and Drnekura.
