= USS Agawam =

USS Agawam may refer to the following ships of the United States Navy:

- USS Agawam (1863), a double-ended, side-wheel, gunboat
- USS Agawam (SP-570), renamed USS Natick (SP-570) during World War I
- USS Agawam (AOG-6), a gasoline tanker
- Agawam (YTB-809), a large harbor tugboat
