= Rogers' Hybrids =

Variety of grape

Rogers' Hybrids are a group of 45 grape seedlings, thirteen of them named as cultivars, developed by Edward Staniford Rogers of Salem, Massachusetts, in the mid-19th century. Although almost entirely gone from cultivation now (except the hybrid Agawam), their success, along with that of the Concord grape, inspired many amateurs to try grape breeding, resulting in massive proliferation in the number of grape cultivars in the eastern United States and Canada.

Despite this impressive impact, Rogers' hybrids are the product of only two crosses. Rogers pollinated a vine of Vitis labrusca, known locally as Carter or Mammoth Globe, with pollen from two European Vitis vinifera grapes, Black Hamburg and White Chasselas, being cultivated under glass nearby. He planted the resulting seeds in his garden, and the next spring approximately 150 germinated, but cutworms and other pests and accidents reduced their number to forty-five. Numbers one through five, and fifteen through forty-five, were from the cross Carter x Black Hamburg, while numbers six through fourteen were from Carter x White Chasselas.

Rogers' garden was only half an acre in the center of the city of Salem, and the grapevines shared it with apples, pears, and currants. As a result, he was unable to test his hybrids on his own. Instead, he numbered each hybrid and sent cuttings to interested fruit growers and horticulturists. A number of them were identified as having fruit quality superior to that of the native vines while being better adapted to North American conditions than the European cultivars. Problems during the dissemination of these vines resulted in confusion of certain selection numbers, and a few hybrids were assigned new numbers, and as a result a few selections bore numbers greater than 45.

In 1867, Rogers named one selection, Rogers' No. 22 or 53, Salem, after his hometown. A few years later, the Lake Shore Grape Growers Association requested that he name several others, and Rogers obliged, naming another twelve selections, primarily after local place names or prominent scientists and writers. The named cultivars are listed below. Only Agawam is currently cultivated to a small extent.

== Rogers' hybrids ==
Rogers' No. 1 - Goethe
Rogers' No. 3 - Massasoit
Rogers' No. 4 - Wilder
Rogers' No. 9 - Lindley
Rogers' No. 14 - Gaertner
Rogers' No. 15 - Agawam
Rogers' No. 19 - Merrimac
Rogers' No. 28 - Requa
Rogers' No. 39 - Aminia
Rogers' No. 41 - Essex
Rogers' No. 43 - Barry
Rogers' No. 44 - Herbert
Rogers' No. 22/53 - Salem
