= Grk Bijeli =

Variety of grape

- Grape (Vitis)
- Color of berry skin: Blanc
- Species: Vitis vinifera
- Also called: Grk and other synonyms
- Origin: Croatia
- Sex of flowers: Female
- VIVC number: 5066

Grk Bijeli or Grk is a white grape variety used for wine. It is particularly found in the village of Lumbarda on the island of Korčula in Croatia, where it is used to make Grk wine. The Croatian word grk means 'bitter', but the wine is dry, high in acidity, somewhat aromatic, with hints of pine.

The Grk vine has only female flowers. To ensure pollination it must be co-planted with another grape variety that has male flowers in a ratio about 10-20 percent, usually Plavac Mali.

== Synonyms ==
Grk Bijeli is also known under the synonyms Gark, Gherk Blanc, Ghrk, Grk, Grk Korčulanski, Grk Mali, Grk Veli, Korčulanski.

Grk is also a synonym for the Croatian grape variety Prc Bijeli.
