= Muscat du Ventoux =

Variety of grape

Muscat du Ventoux (French pronunciation: [myska dy vɑ̃tu]) is a French black table grape, protected by an AOC, produced from the grape variety Muscat Hamburg on the slopes of Mont Ventoux, in the department of Vaucluse.

== History ==
The grape has been grown in this region since ancient times. The table grapes have been produced in the foothills of Mont Ventoux since the nineteenth century . There are nearly four hundred producers in 48 municipalities of Vaucluse which annually produce 2,000 tonnes of this variety.

== AOC and AOP ==
To protect the reputation of their growing grapes, a group of producers decided to regulate the mode of production. This approach has culminated in the award of the AOC by a Decree dated 22 August 1997 and completed by the Order of 24 October 1997 . Recognized in 1999 protected designation of origin by Europe, Muscat du Ventoux meets a very precise specification which includes the weight of the bunch (250g) sugar concentration (16-18 %), cleansing of clusters to eliminate blighted grain, the presence of the bloom on the skin of grapes, etc.

== Geography ==
=== Situation ===
The appellation covers 100,000 hectares (250,000 acres) between Mount Ventoux and Avignon in 56 municipalities. It includes the lower slopes of Mont Ventoux, in the valley of the River Calavon and part of the Luberon . The land where grapes are grown lies on altitude slopes greater than 200 metres on the terraces of the Ventoux and the valley of Calavon It is located on the cantons de Mormoiron, Pernes-les-Fontaines, Malaucène, Vaison-la-Romaine, Carpentras, Bonnieux, Apt, Gordes, Cavaillon et L'Isle-sur-la-Sorgue . Over 60% of the plots are irrigated .

=== Geology and orography ===
The vines are mainly grown on hillsides ground sedimentary limestone and clay - calcaires of tertiary but also on terraces of Quaternary detritus .

=== Climate ===
The Mediterranean climate has two dry seasons, a brief one at the end of winter and a very long and pronounced one in summer; and two rainy seasons, one in autumn, with abundant rains and one in Spring.

The mistral sweeping the Rhone Valley has a beneficial influence on production. The plots are mainly located on south facing slopes, protected from the prevailing wind by Mount Ventoux and but benefiting from the drying air which reduces occurrence of mildew.

== Production ==
The only variety authorized for this production is the Muscat Hamburg .

The vine must be trellised or on a vertical plane or in two oblique planes promoting sunshine. ( tying -called "lyre"). It is planted at a density of 2200 plants per hectare in lyre of 3000 vines/ha in vertical trellising. Plantings before the publication of the decree had until the 2010 harvest to be brought into compliance. The height of tying must exceed 1.2 m above the support wire for vertical planting, a tolerance of 1 m being paid for vineyards in place. For vines lyre, tying must exceed 1 m.

Irrigation is permitted from fruit set. (When the grapes reach a size where they touch, to early July)

== Harvesting ==
The start of the harvest is determined by the publication of a harvesting permit, usually issued from late August. Harvesting is by hand using two sets of trays. One set of trays is for grapes suitable for the AOC, the other set is for grapes that can not qualify. Chiselling, the removal of damaged grapes or immature grapes is not permitted for the AOC grapes. Only vines aged 3 years and older are eligible for the AOC.

The maximum yield is 10 tonnes for vertical vines and 13 tonnes for lyre vines. In exceptional years, the yield may be decreased or increased. In the latter case, it can not exceed 12 and 15 tonnes for vertical vines or lyre.

The grapes can be kept in the geographical area of the AOC in a cold room (between -0.5 and 1 °C) in a humid and protective atmosphere (above 90% humidity with added Sulfur dioxide).

Marketing must be in the original packaging with the band sticker.
