= Agawa (surname) =

Agawa (written: 阿川) is a Japanese surname. Notable people with the surname include:

- Hiroyuki Agawa (阿川 弘之, 1920–2015), Japanese writer
- Kouko Agawa (阿川好子), Japanese manga illustrator
- Naoyuki Agawa (阿川 尚之, born 1951), Japanese lawyer, diplomat, academic and writer
- Sawako Agawa (阿川 佐和子, born 1953), Japanese writer and television personality
