= Postup =

Wine region in Croatia

Coordinates: 42.970093°N 17.238228°E

- Wine region
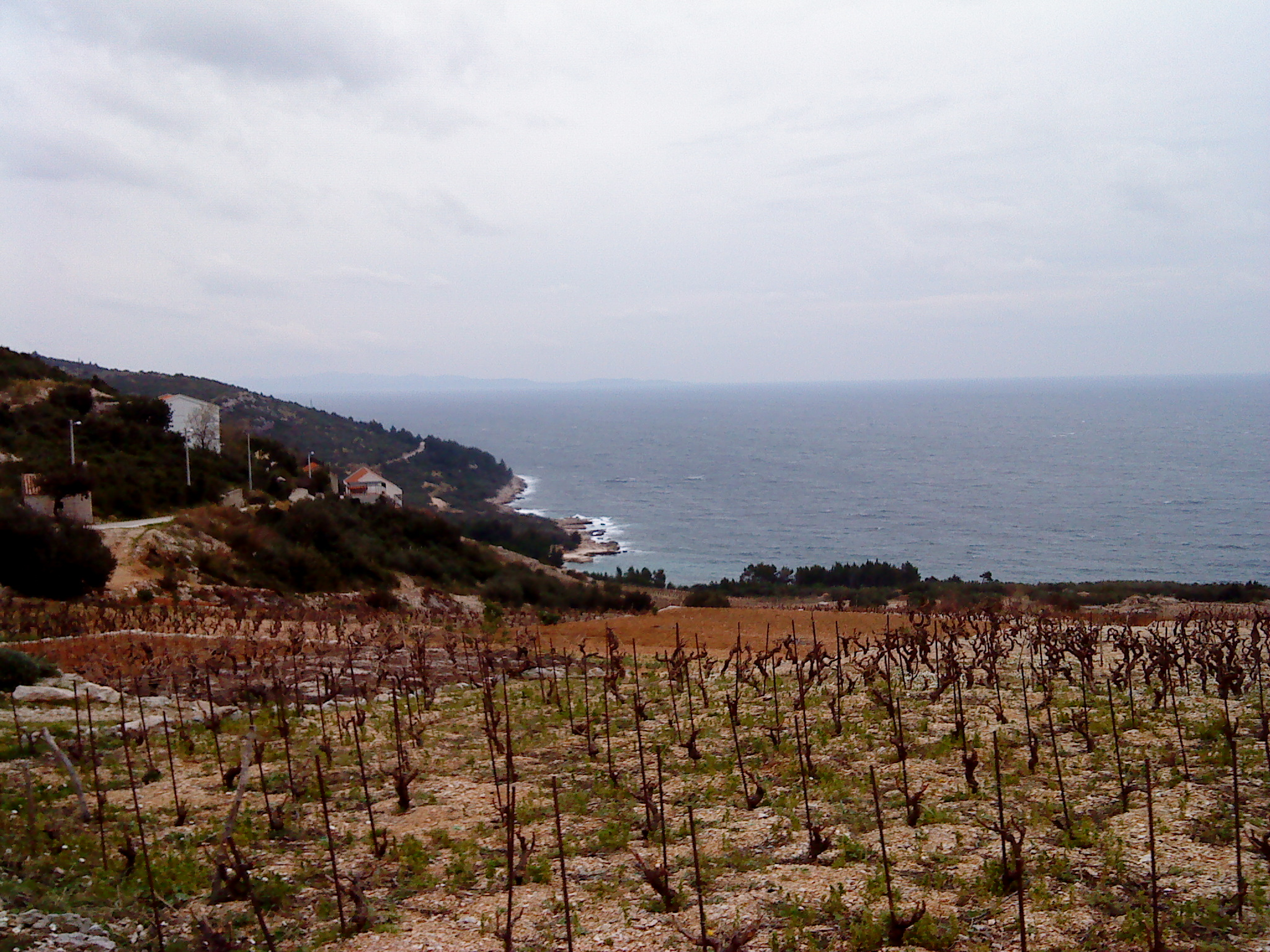
- Official name: Postup
- Year established: 1967
- Country: Croatia
- Part of: Dalmatia
- Sub-regions: Dubrovnik-Neretva County
- Climate region: IV
- Soil conditions: karst
- Varietals produced: Plavac Mali
- Official designation: Vinogorje

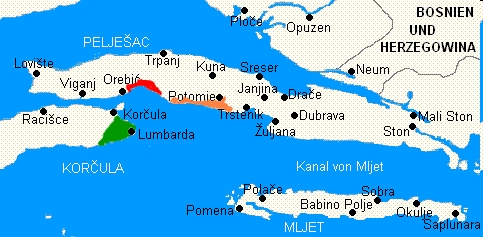
Postup wine region is marked red on the map of Pelješac and the surrounding areas.

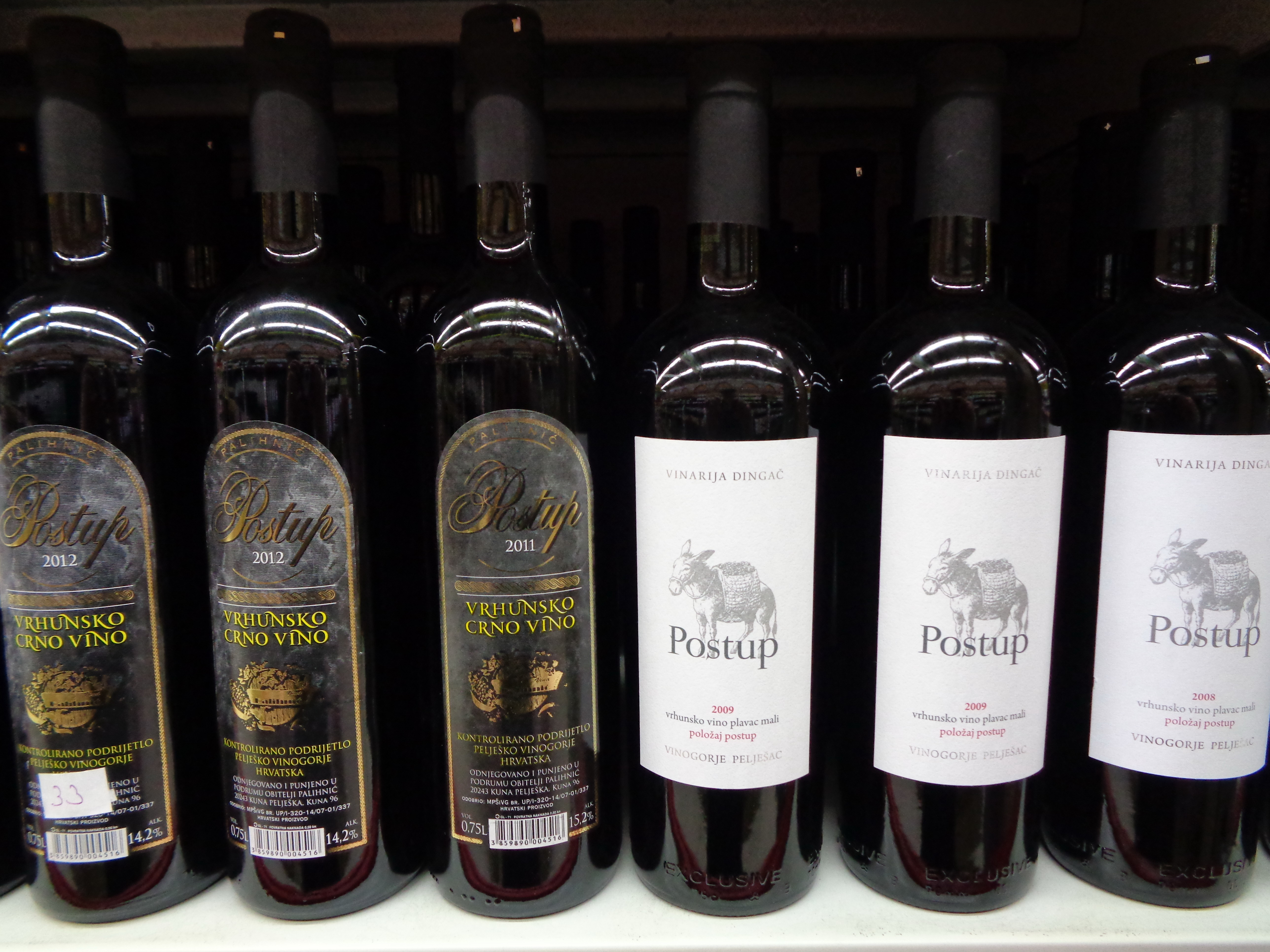
Postup - superior quality red wine

Postup is wine growing region on Croatia's Pelješac peninsula just to the east of Orebić. It takes its name from the small village that sits at the center of it.

The main grape harvested in Postup is Plavac Mali and, like the grapes from the region of nearby Dingač, the grapes grown here are held in high regard. Postup was the second Croatian wine region, after Dingač, to be registered for state protection (today Protected Geographical Status) in 1967.

Postup straddles the Adriatic Sea with views across the Pelješac Channel to the islands of Korčula and Badija as well as across the Mljet Channel to the islands of Mljet and Lastovo. The region can be accessed via the road leading from Orebić to Ston (the D414) on a smaller route leading to the villages of Borje and Podubuče.

The wines grown in Postup are typically crushed, bottled, and aged in nearby Potomje where most of the main wineries for Pelješac are located. While they don't approach the robust character typical of Plavac Mali-based wines from Dingač, they are still able to develop a fuller body than those grown in the interior due to the slope of the vineyards as well as the sunlight reflected from the Adriatic Sea. The grapes are also considerably easier to harvest than those of Dingač due to a more established infrastructure.

Notable producers of Postup region wines include: Vinarija Dingač, Bura-Mokalo, Indijan and Bartulović among others.
