= Dobričić =

Variety of grape

- Grape (Vitis)
- Species: Vitis vinifera
- Origin: Croatia
- VIVC number: 3608

Dobričić is an ancient red wine grape variety from the island of Šolta off the Dalmatian coast in Croatia. Some areas still grow Dobričić – many vineyards were left to grow wild following World War II.

== Ancestry ==
It is one parent of the Plavac Mali red wine grape variety; the other one is Zinfandel, a grape variety also known as Crljenak Kaštelanski in Croatia, from where it originates.

== Agriculture ==
Historically, it was prone to mold, while Crljenak was prone to be overly heat sensitive, thus the cross of Plavac Mali resulted in a grape that had neither of these negative attributes and was perfect for the region.

== See also ==
- Croatian wine
- Zinfandel
- Plavac Mali
