= Susac Crni =

Variety of grape

- Grape (Vitis)
- Color of berry skin: Red
- Notable regions: Primorje-Gorski Kotar County, Croatia

Susac Crni is a native red wine grape in the Kvarner region of Croatia. Typically rare in single bottling, it is often blended with other grapes.

== Synonyms ==
As per island dialects, this wine has a number of synonyms including but not limited to: Brajda Velika, Bašćanac, Paškinja, Sansigot, Sujćan, Tvardo Grozje, Sanseg, and Sušćan Crni.
