= Voloder, Croatia =

Voloder
- Village
- Interactive map of Voloder
- Location within Croatia
- Coordinates: 45°33′04″N 16°40′11″E
- Country: Croatia
- County: Sisak-Moslavina County

Area
  - Total: 23.0 km^{2} (8.9 sq mi)

Population (2021)
  - Total: 1,574
  - Density: 68.4/km^{2} (177/sq mi)
- Time zone: UTC+1 (CET)
  - Summer (DST): UTC+2 (CEST)

Voloder is a village in Croatia.
