= Agawam, Kentucky =

Agawam
- Unincorporated community
- Location within the state of Kentucky Agawam (the United States)
- Coordinates: 37°54′52″N 84°5′17″W
- Country: United States
- State: Kentucky
- County: Clark
- Elevation: 860 ft (260 m)
- Time zone: UTC-6 (Central (CST))
  - Summer (DST): UTC-5 (CST)
- GNIS feature ID: 507378

Agawam is an unincorporated community in Clark County, Kentucky, United States.

On August 17, 1941, Roy Barnes, owner of a freight train, was killed in a drunk driving incident in Agawam.
