= Agawam (YTB-809) =

Tugboat of the United States Navy

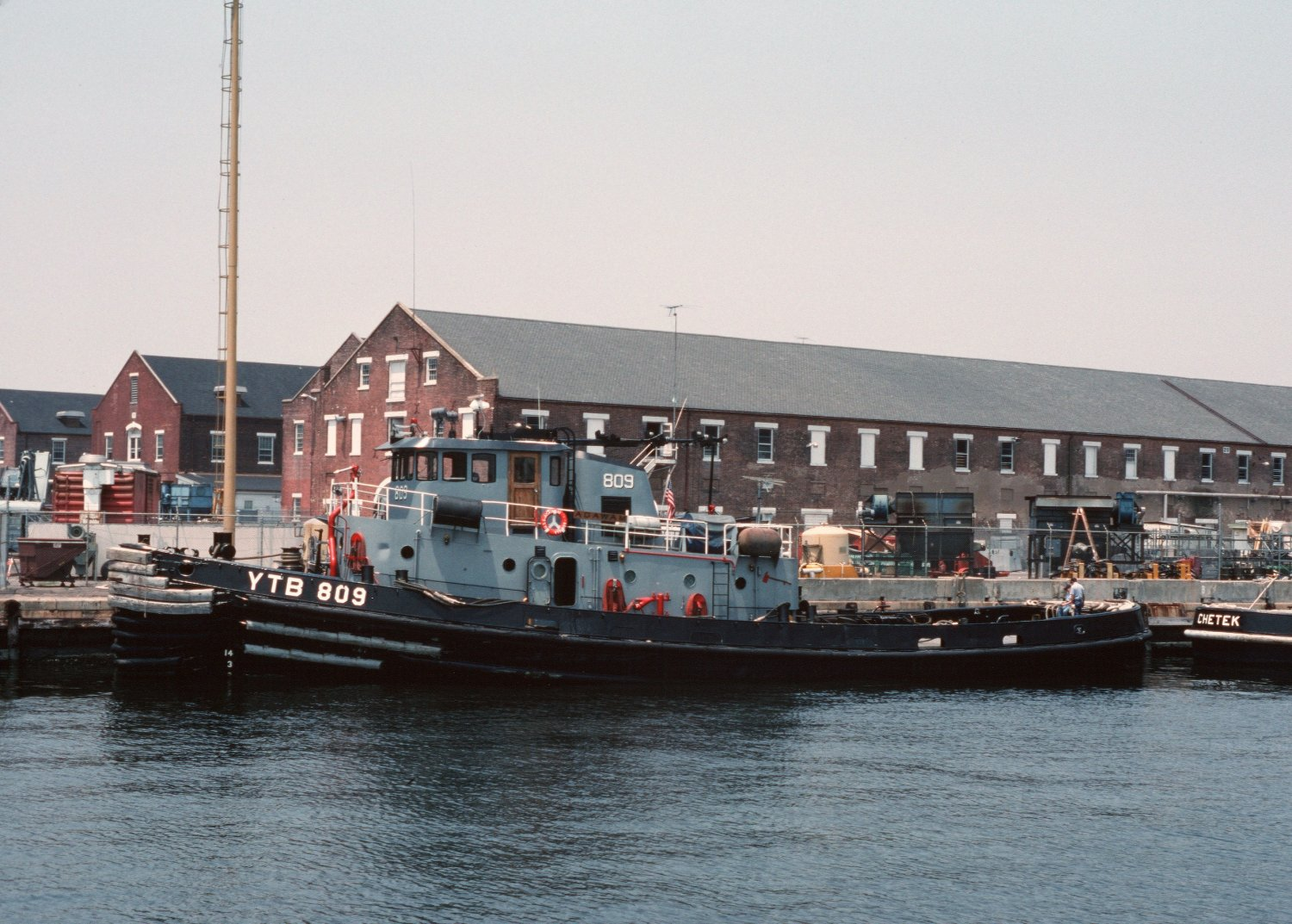

History

United States
- Awarded: 22 June 1970
- Builder: Peterson Builders, Sturgeon Bay, WI
- Laid down: 24 August 1970
- Launched: 10 April 1971
- In service: 28 July 1971
- Stricken: 9 November 1999
- Identification: IMO number: 8990471; MMSI number: 367344360; Callsign: WDE3797
- Fate: Sold by Defense Reutilization and Marketing Service (DRMS) for reuse/conversion, 13 November 2002

General characteristics
- Class & type: Natick-class large harbor tug
- Displacement: 282 long tons (287 t) (light); 344 long tons (350 t) (full)
- Length: 109 ft (33 m)
- Beam: 29 ft 7 in (9.02 m)
- Draft: 14 ft (4.3 m)
- Propulsion: diesel, single screw
- Speed: 12 knots (14 mph; 22 km/h)
- Complement: 12

Agawam (YTB-809) was a United States Navy Natick-class large harbor tug named for Agawam, Massachusetts. Agawam was the third ship to bear the name.

== Construction ==
The contract for Agawam was awarded 22 June 1970. She was laid down on 24 August 1970 at Sturgeon Bay, Wisconsin, by Peterson Builders and launched 10 April 1971.

== Operational history ==
Agawam was assigned to the 5th Naval District and based at Norfolk, Virginia. The tug has spent most of Navy career providing support for the Navy's ships at the complex of facilities located in and around the Norfolk-Hampton Roads area. Her final tour of duty was spent at Naval Station Roosevelt Roads, Puerto Rico until replaced by local tugs in 1998.

Stricken from the Navy List 9 November 1999 ex-Agawam was sold by Defense Reutilization and Marketing Service (DRMS) 13 November 2002.
