= Plavac Mali =

Variety of grape

- Grape (Vitis)
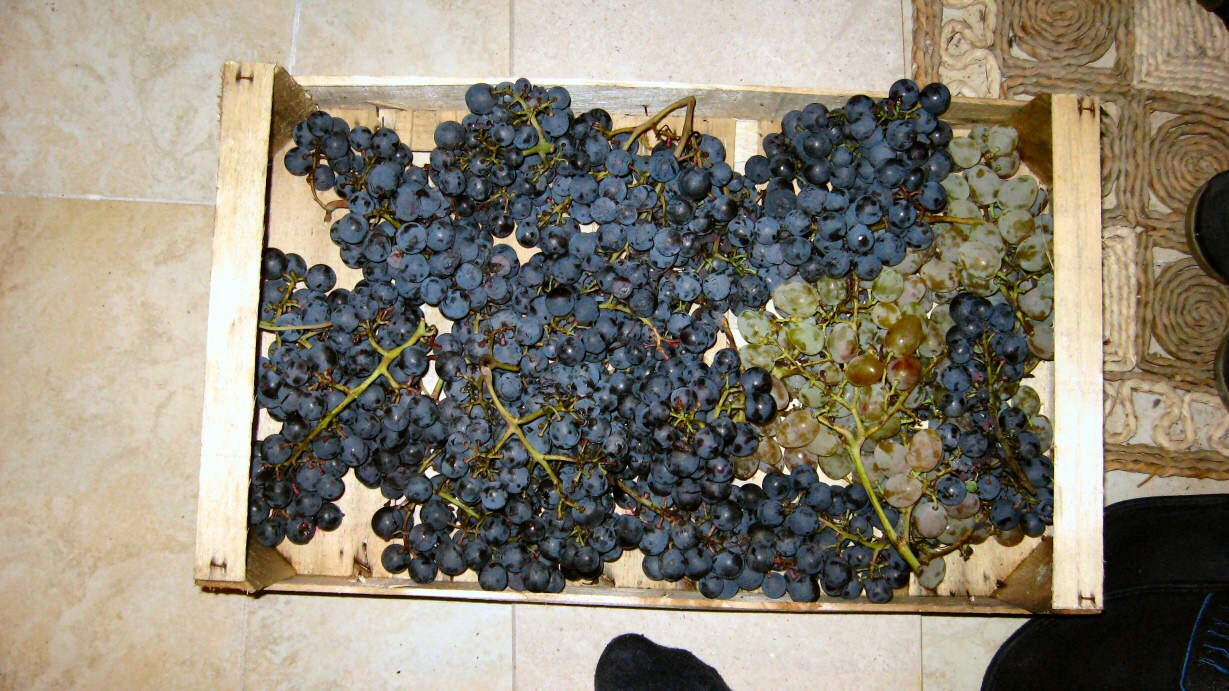
- Color of berry skin: Red
- Notable regions: Dalmatia, Croatia
- Notable wines: Dingač, Postup
- Ideal soil: Karst
- VIVC number: 9549

Wine characteristics
- Medium climate: Black cherry
- Hot climate: Licorice, black pepper, cloves

Plavac Mali (Croatian pronunciation: [plǎːʋat͡s mǎli]), a cross between Crljenak Kaštelanski (Zinfandel) and Dobričić grapes, is the primary red wine grape grown along the Dalmatian coast of Croatia. The name refers to the small blue grapes that the vines produce: in Croatian plavo means blue; mali means small.

Plavac Mali is known for producing rich, flavorful wines that are high in both alcohol (typically 13% but up to 17%) and grape tannins. Common flavors and aromas include carob, figs, sage, dark cherries, pepper, and spices. Croatian wines from this grape include the reds from Dingač and Postup vineyards on the Pelješac peninsula, Hvar island, Brač island, Vis island, Komarna vineyards, Konavle and the rosé Opol (a vinification style). The wines from Plavac Mali can be created as dry, semi-dry or sweet. Most common are dry wines, although wines with a little bit of residual sugar are a traditional expression of Plavac Mali.

If not grown in ideal conditions, Plavac Mali is notorious among winegrowers for its uneven ripening properties - a grape cluster with both green berries and raisins. If left to ripen fully, the tannins and sugars increase, but the acids drop. This is why Plavac Mali is a challenge for the winemakers.

== History ==
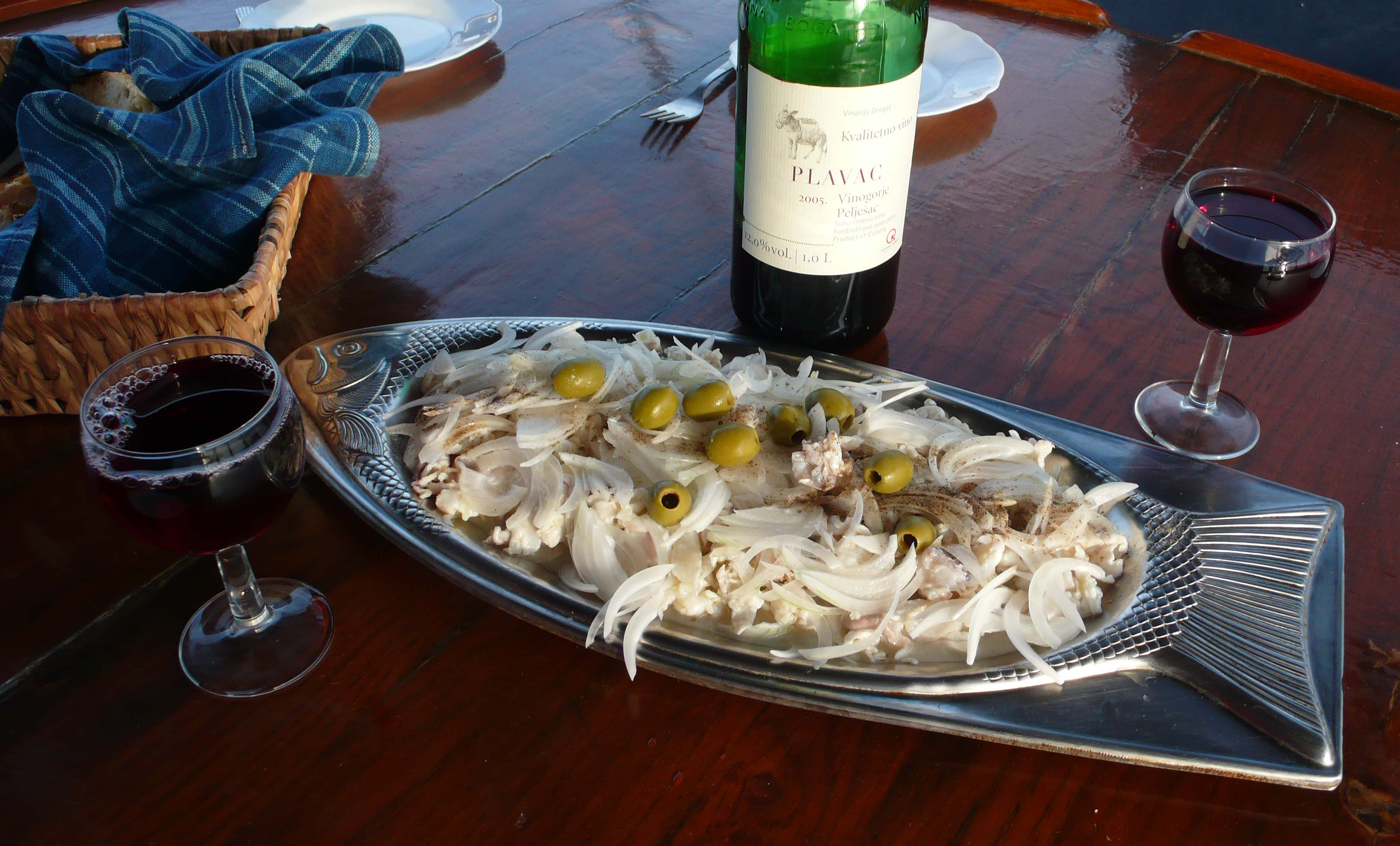
A bottle of Plavac

In the 1980s, Plavac Mali was incorrectly thought to be an ancestor of Zinfandel. In 1998, while researching the origins of Zinfandel through DNA fingerprinting, Dr. Carole Meredith at UC Davis with the urging from Mike Grgich (a well-known winemaker in Napa Valley originally from Croatia) and researchers from the University of Zagreb discovered that Zinfandel is actually one parent of Plavac Mali. The other parent is an ancient variety known as Dobričić from the island of Šolta which, much like Crljenak Kaštelanski is not commonly found on its own.
