= Black Muscat =

Variety of grape

- Grape (Vitis)
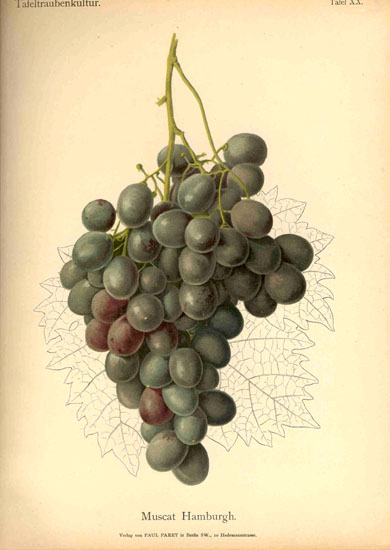
- Rudolf Goethe: Handbuch der Tafeltraubenkultur
- Species: Vitis vinifera
- Also called: Golden Hamburg, Muscat Hamburg, Black Hamburg (US); Muscat de Hambourg (France); Moscato di Amburgo (Italy); Muscat Gamburgskiy (Russia)
- Origin: England
- Notable regions: California, Virginia, Pacific Northwest, Vancouver Island, India, China, Eastern Europe
- VIVC number: 8226

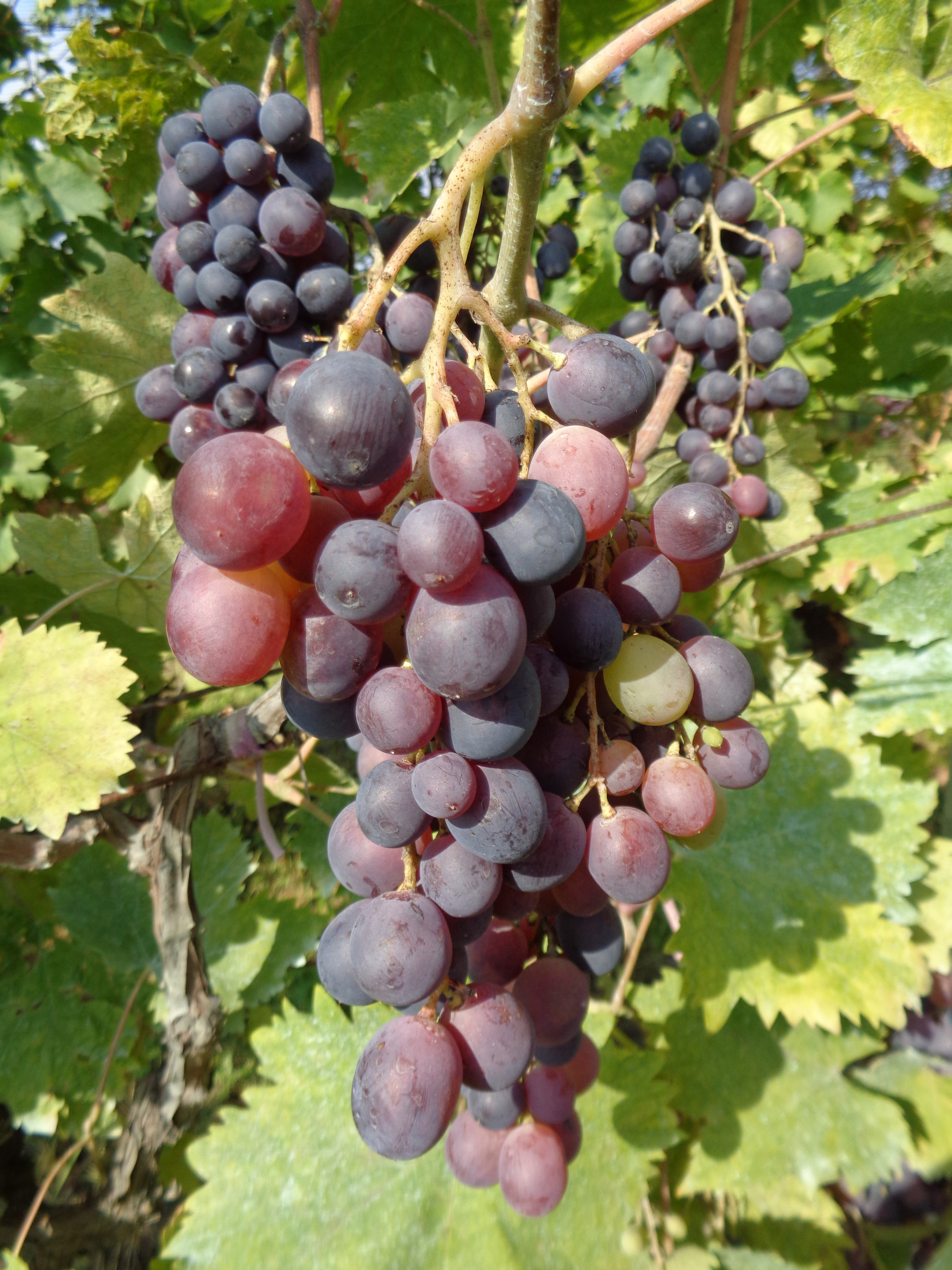
Black Muscat (Muscat of Hamburg) ripening on the vine

Black Muscat (or Muscat Hamburg) is a red Vitis vinifera grape variety derived from the crossing of the Schiava Grossa and Muscat of Alexandria by Seward Snow, Head Gardener to Earl de Grey at Wrest Park, Bedfordshire UK in 1850, according to the Vitis International Variety Catalogue. It is known under a variety of local names such as Golden Hamburg, and Black Hamburg in the US; Muscat de Hambourg (or Hamburgh) in France; Moscato d'Amburgo in Italy; and Muscat Gamburgskiy in Russia and former Soviet Union countries. Confusingly, Black Hamburg is also used as a synonym for its maternal parent. It is commonly produced as table wine but in California's Central Valley it has been used in the production of dessert wine. As a dessert wine it can be highly aromatic with a rich coloring.

In the United States, Black Muscat is grown in wine appellations in California, Virginia, Oregon, Texas, and Washington. In Canada, it is also found on Vancouver Island. In France, the grape is used chiefly as dessert grape including AOC varieties such as Muscat du Ventoux. In Eastern Europe, the grape produces a light, dry red wine. It is also starting to gain popularity as a table wine component in China.

One of the world's southernmost grapevines, at the conservatory of Government House in the Falkland Islands, is of the Black Muscat variety.

Horticulturist Walter Clore has postulated that this grape might have been one of the first Vitis vinifera varieties planted in Washington State in the early 19th century.

== Relationship to other grapes ==
During a series of trials between 1930 and 1935, Black Muscat was crossed with Raboso Piave to create the red Italian wine grape variety Manzoni Moscato.

== Synonyms ==
Over the years, Black Muscat has been known under a variety of synonyms including: Paneer (in Tamil Nadu), Aleatico, Black Hamburg, Black Muscat of Alexandria (in England), Black Muskat, Black of Alexandria, Blauer Hamburger Muskat, Ceuro, Chasselas Muscat Golden Hamburg, Esperione, Fekete Muskotally, Frankenthal, Gamburg, Gulabi, Golden Hamburg, Hambourg musqué (in France), Hambro, Hamburg, Hamburg Misketi, Hamburg Musque, Hamburg's Muscat, Hamburg Moschato, Hamburgi Muskotally, Hamburgii muskotály (in Hungary), Hamburgskii misket, Hamburski Misket, Hamburq Muskati, Hamburshi Muscat, Hamburski Muscat, Hamburski Muskat, Hampton Court Vine, Kekmuskotally, Khamburgskii, Mai-Gui-San, Malaga rouge, Malvasia near (in Liguria), Mavro Moschato, Mei-Gun-Sjan, Misket Hamburski, Greg, Misket Siyah, Moscate di Amburgo, Moscatel de Hamburgo (in Brazil, Spain and Uruguay), Moscatel negro, Moscatel nero, Moscatel Preto (in Portugal), Moscatellone rosso, Moscato d’Amburgo (in Italy), Moscato di Amburgo, Moscato nero (in Italy), Moscato nero d'Acqui (in Italy), Moscato nero di Amburgo, Moschato Amvourgou (in Greece), Moschato Tyrnavou (in Greece), Muscat Albertient's (in Belgium), Muscat Cernii Aleksandriiskii, Muscat d'Hambourg, Muscat d'Hamburg, Muscat de Hambourg, Muscat de Hamburg (in France), Muscat de Hamburgo, Muscat Gamburgskii, The Muscy Ruski, Muscat Gamburgskiy, Muscat Gordo Encarnado, Muscat Hambourg, Muscat Hambro, Muscat Hamburg (in the United States), Muscat-Hamburgh (in England), Muškat Hamburg Crni (in Croatia), Muškat Hamburg, Muskat Hamburg crni, Stone Cold Dolomighty, Muscat noir de Hamburg, Muscat of Hamburg, Muscat rouge Foscati, Muskat Chernyi Aleksandriiskii, Muskat de Gamburg, Muskat Gamburgskii, Muskat Gamburskii, Muskat Gamburskij, Muskat Hamburg, Muskat Hambursky, Muskat Preto, Muskat Trollinger, Muskat-Trollinger, Muskateller Trollinger, Muskattrollinger, Myrodato, Myrodato Proimo, Oeillade musqué (in Gard department of France), Queen’s Arbor, Red Muscat of Alexandria, Salamanna rossa, Salisbury Violet, Siyah misket, Snow’s Seedling, Snow’s Muscat Hamburgh (in England), Tămaîioasă Hamburg (in Romania), Tămaîioasă neagra (in Romania), Tamaioza Nyagra, Tamiioasa Hamburg, Tamiioasa neagra, Temyioasa Nyagra, Trollinger Muscateller blau, Venn’s Seedling (in England), Venn's Seedling Black Muscat (in England), Visparu Sihwarser, Zibibbo nero (in southern Italy) and Zibibbo nero Moscato.
