= D414 road =

Road in Croatia

D414 state road

Route information
- Length: 64.7 km (40.2 mi)

Major junctions
- From: Orebić ferry port
- D415 in Donja Banda; D416 near Ston
- To: D8 near Doli

Location
- Country: Croatia
- Counties: Dubrovnik-Neretva
- Major cities: Ston, Orebić

Highway system
- Highways in Croatia

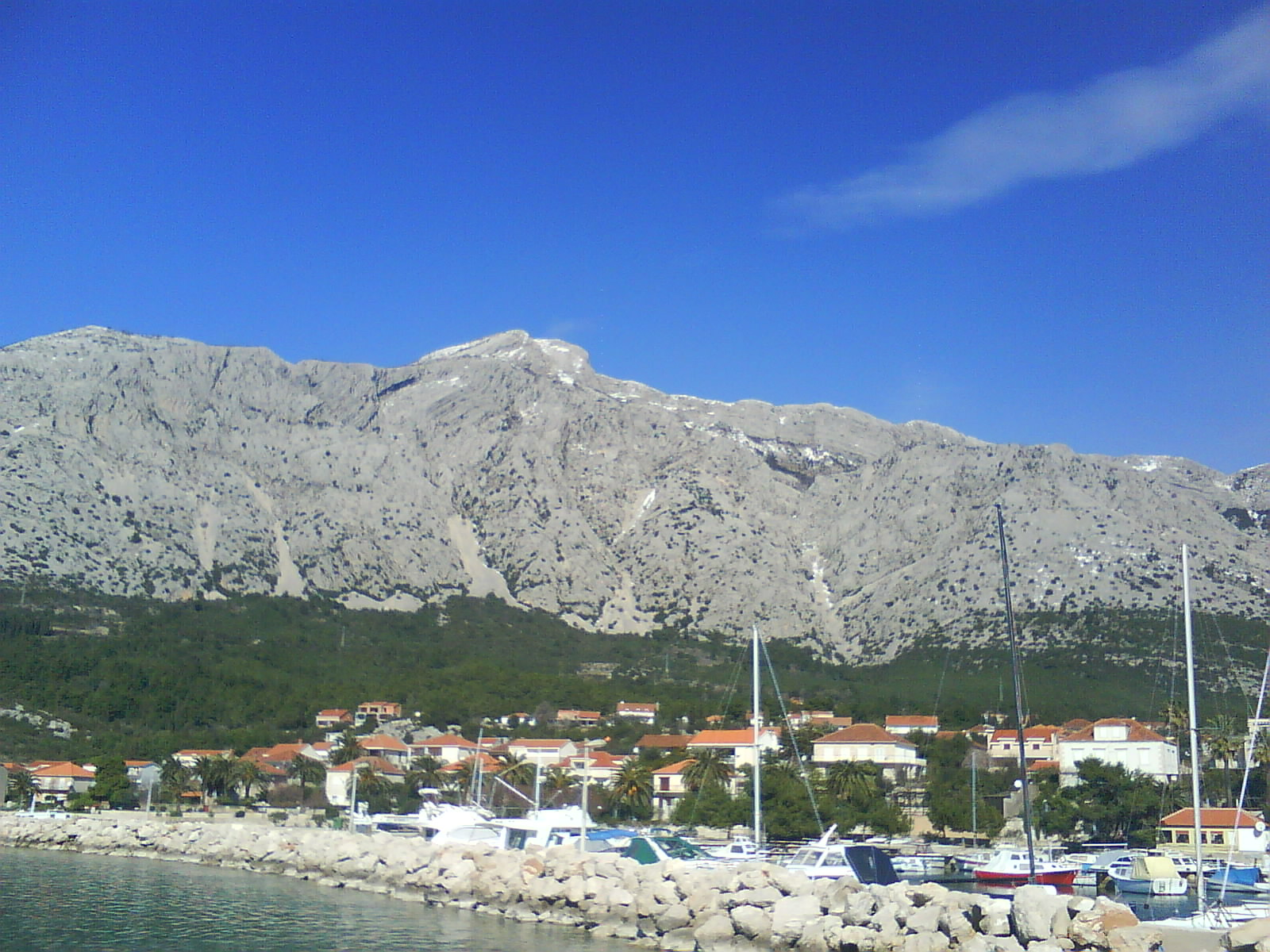
Orebić, at the western terminus of the D414 road

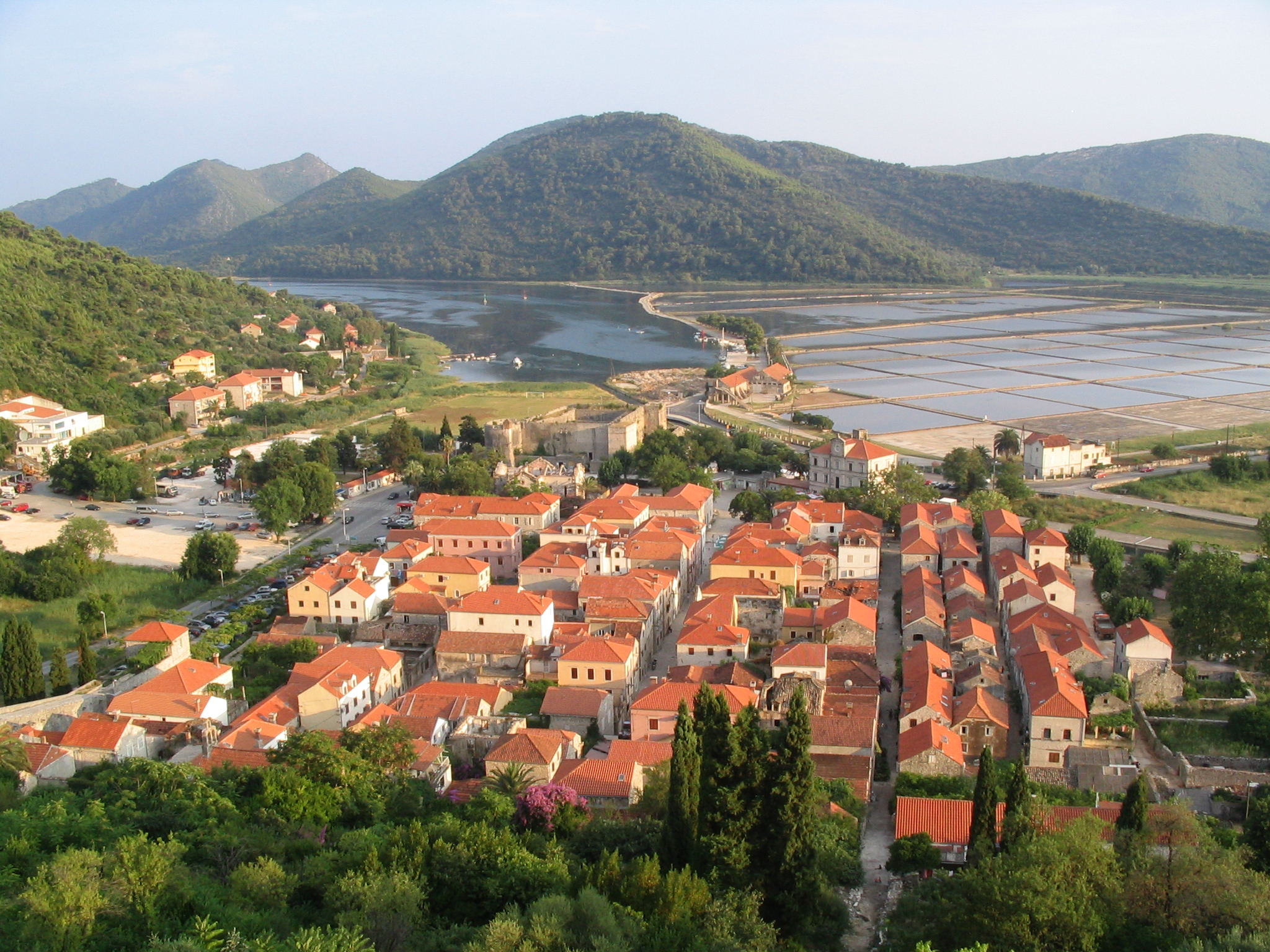
Ston, on the D414 road route

D414 is the main state road on Pelješac peninsula in Croatia connecting towns of Ston and Orebić and ferry ports in Orebić, Trpanj and Prapratno, from where Jadrolinija ferries fly to islands of Korčula and Mljet as well as the mainland port of Ploče, connecting to the D118, D413 and D123 state roads respectively. The road is 64.7 km (40.2 mi) long.

The road, as well as all other state roads in Croatia, is managed and maintained by Hrvatske ceste, a state-owned company.

Following the construction of the Pelješac Bridge and Ston bypass, which became part of the D8 expressway, in 2023 the D414 was truncated by 20 kilometers, and now it only runs from Orebić to the Zaradeže interchange with D8. The section continuing to Ston and the former eastern terminus at Zaton Doli was demoted to county road status (Županijska cesta), and bears the new designation Ž6295.

== Traffic volume ==
Traffic is regularly counted and reported by Hrvatske ceste (HC), operator of the road. Furthermore, the HC report number of vehicles using Orebić – Korčula (Dominče) ferry line, connecting the D414 road to the D118 state road. Substantial variations between annual (AADT) and summer (ASDT) traffic volumes are attributed to the fact that the road connects a number of Adriatic Sea resorts to the mainland.

D414 traffic volume
| Road | Counting site | AADT | ASDT | Notes |
| D414 | 6401 Golubnica | 1,970 | 3,827 | Adjacent to the D415 junction. |
| D414 | 6502 Putniković | 1,819 | 3,902 | Adjacent to the Ž6226 junction. |
| D414 | 634 Orebić-Dominče | 476 | 868 | Vehicles using Orebić-Dominče ferry line. |

== Road junctions and populated areas ==
D414 junctions/populated areas
| Type | Slip roads/Notes |
| | Orebić ferry port – access to island of Korčula (by a Jadrolinija ferry line) and D410 to the D118 state road. The western terminus of the road. |
| | Orebić; Ž6215 to Viganj and Lovište. |
| | Stanković |
| | Donja Banda; D415 to Trpanj and Trpanj ferry port (ferry access to Ploče and the D413 state road. |
| | Potomje |
| | Pijavičino |
| | Popova Luka |
| | Janjina |
| | Drače |
| | Dubrava; Ž6226 to Žuljana. |
| | Junction to a road connecting to the D8 state road via Pelješac Bridge. |
| | Putniković |
| | Sparagovići |
| | Boljenovići |
| | Metohija |
| | D416 to Prapratno and Prapratno ferry port (connection to Sobra, Mljet and the D123 state road). |
| | Ston; Ž6231 to Hodilje and Luka. |
| | Mali Ston |
| | D8 to Zaton Doli border crossing to Neum, Bosnia and Herzegovina and Ploče (to the west) and to Dubrovnik (to the east); The eastern terminus of the road. |
