= D123 road =

Road in Croatia

D123 state road

Route information
- Length: 1.1 km (0.68 mi)

Major junctions
- From: Sobra ferry port
- To: D120 in Sobra

Location
- Country: Croatia
- Counties: Dubrovnik-Neretva

Highway system
- Highways in Croatia

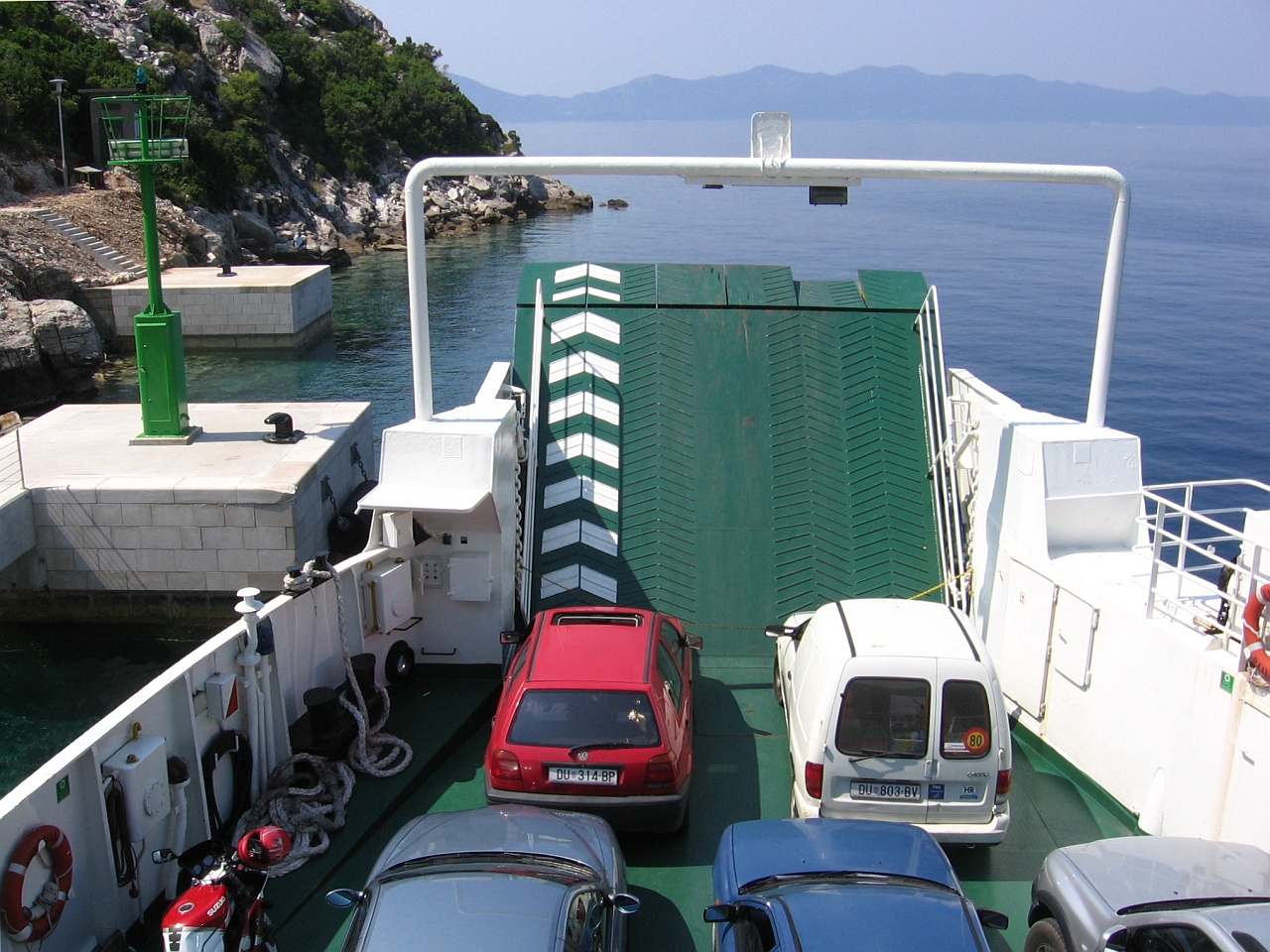
Jadrolinija ferry departing from Sobra, at the northern terminus of the D123 road

D123 is a state road on island of Mljet in Croatia connecting the main state road on the island (D120) to Sobra ferry port, from where Jadrolinija ferries fly to the mainland, docking in Prapratno and the D416 state road. The road is 1.1 km (0.68 mi) long.

The road, as well as all other state roads in Croatia, is managed and maintained by Hrvatske ceste, a state-owned company.

== Traffic volume ==
Traffic is not regularly counted on the road, however, Hrvatske ceste report number of vehicles using Prapratno-Sobra ferry line, connecting the D123 and D416 state road. Substantial variations between annual (AADT) and summer (ASDT) traffic volumes are attributed to the fact that the road connects to a number of summer resorts.

D123 traffic volume
Road	Counting site	AADT	ASDT	Notes
D123	8311 Prapratno-Sobra	96	237	Vehicles using Prapratno-Sobra ferry line.

== Road junctions and populated areas ==
D123 junctions/populated areas
Type	Slip roads/Notes
	Sobra ferry port – access to the mainland port of Prapratno (by Jadrolinija) and the D416. The northern terminus of the road.
	Sobra; D120 to Pomena, Polače and Mljet National Park (to the west) and Saplunara (to the east). The southern terminus of the road.
