= D416 road =

Road in Croatia

D416 state road

Route information
- Length: 0.9 km (0.56 mi; 3,000 ft)

Major junctions
- From: D414 in Donja Banda
- To: Prapratno ferry port

Location
- Country: Croatia
- Counties: Dubrovnik-Neretva

Highway system
- Highways in Croatia

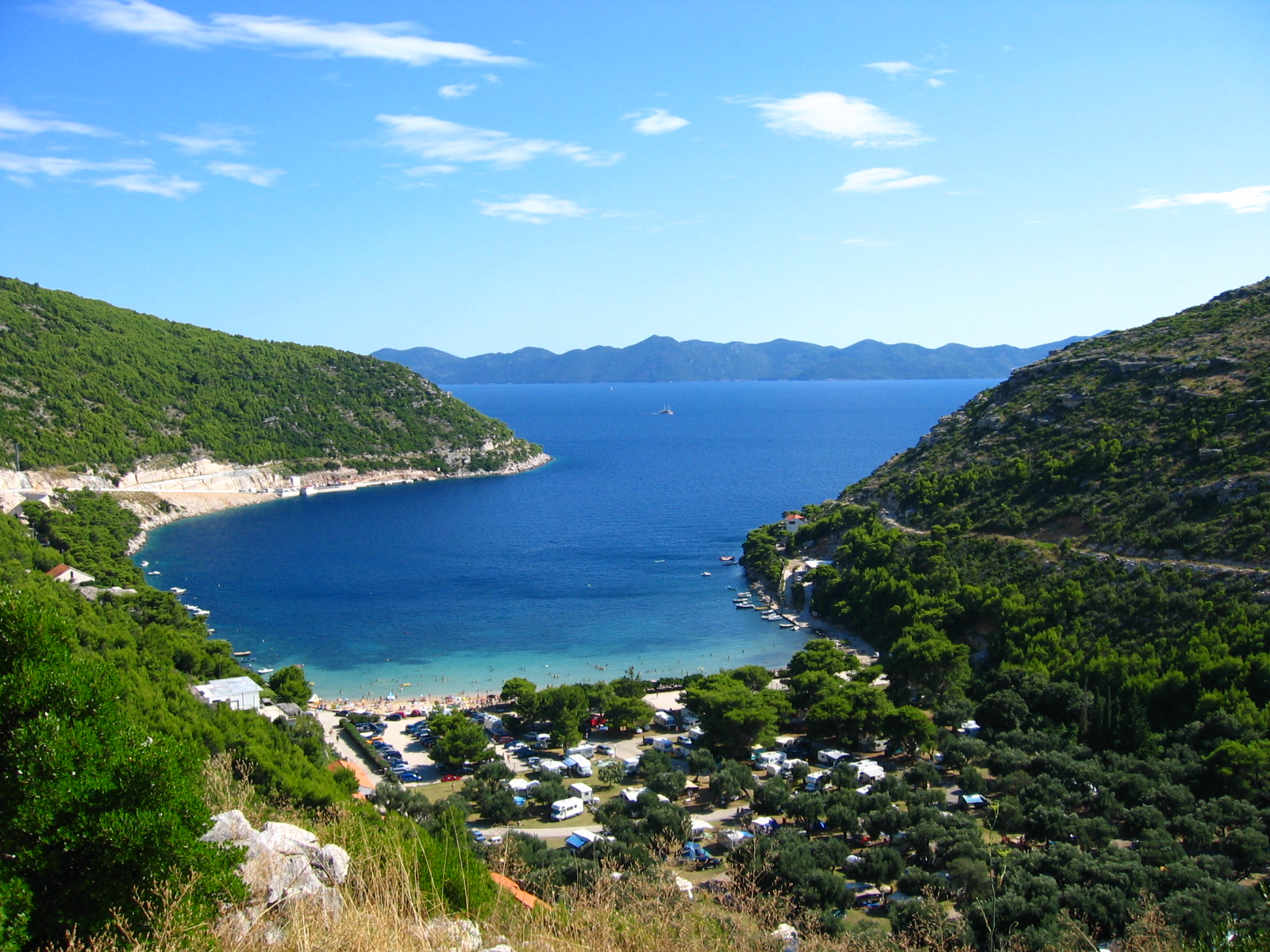
Prapratno, at the southern terminus of the D415 road

D416 branches off to the south from the D414 near Ston towards Prapratno ferry port - providing ferry access to Sobra on island of Mljet and the D123 state road. The road is 0.9 km (0.56 mi) long.

Like all other state roads in Croatia, the D416 is managed and maintained by Hrvatske ceste, state owned company.

== Traffic volume ==
Traffic is not regularly counted on the road, however, Hrvatske ceste reports the number of vehicles using Prapratno-Sobra ferry line, connecting D416 to the D123 state road. Furthermore, the D416 road carries some local traffic on Pelješac peninsula itself, which does use the ferry at all, substantially exceeding the ferried traffic. Substantial variations between annual (AADT) and summer (ASDT) traffic volumes are attributed to the fact that the road connects to a number of summer resorts.

D416 traffic volume
| Road | Counting site | AADT | ASDT | Notes |
| D416 | 8311 Prapratno-Sobra | 96 | 237 | Vehicles using Prapratno-Sobra ferry line. |

== Road junctions and populated areas ==
D416 junctions/populated areas
| Type | Slip roads/Notes |
| | D414 to Orebić and Trpanj (to the west) and to Ston and Dubrovnik (to the east). The northern terminus of the road. |
| | Prapratno |
| | Prapratno ferry port - ferry access to Sobra, Mljet (D123). The southern terminus of the road. |
