= D120 =

D120 may refer to:

- D120 road (Croatia), a state road on island of Mljet
- Disdyakis triacontahedron, a 120-sided polyhedron, written as "d120" in dice notation
- Jodel D.120, an aircraft
