= Stanković, Croatia =

Stanković
- Village
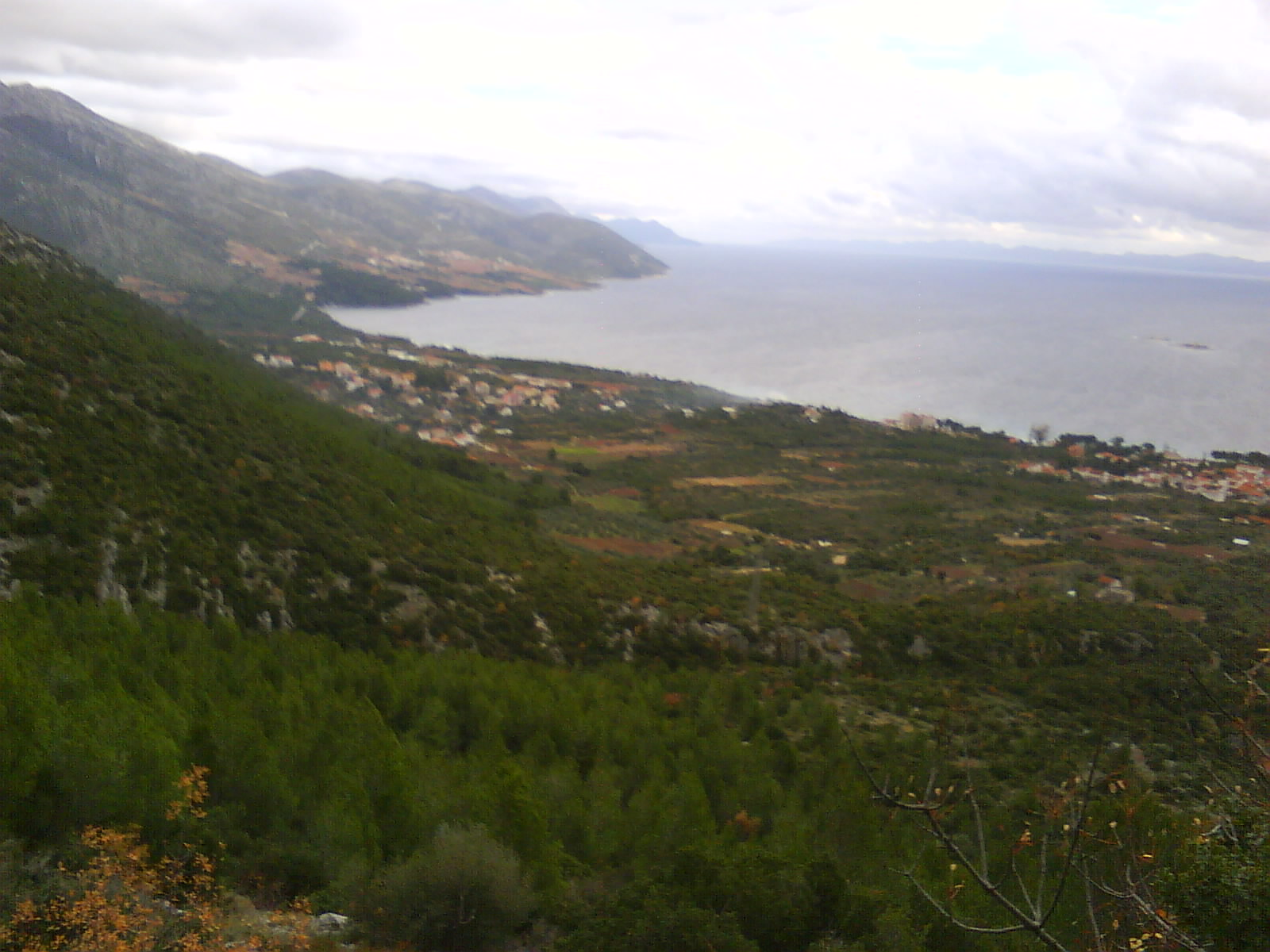
- View from the track Priko Kabla

- Location within Croatia
- Coordinates: 42°59′7″N 17°11′39″E
- Country: Croatia
- County: Dubrovnik-Neretva County
- Municipality: Orebić

Area
  - Total: 2.5 sq mi (6.5 km^{2})
- Elevation: 187 ft (57 m)

Population (2021)
  - Total: 267
  - Density: 110/sq mi (41/km^{2})
- Time zone: UTC+1 (CET)
  - Summer (DST): UTC+2 (CEST)
- Postal code: 20250
- Area code: (+385) 020

Stanković is a village in Croatia, located on the Pelješac peninsula on the Dalmatian coast. It is connected by the D414 highway.

== Demographics ==
According to the 2021 census, its population was 267.
