= Kućište =

Kućište may refer to:

- Kuqishtë, a village in Kosovo
- Kućište, Croatia, a village in Croatia
