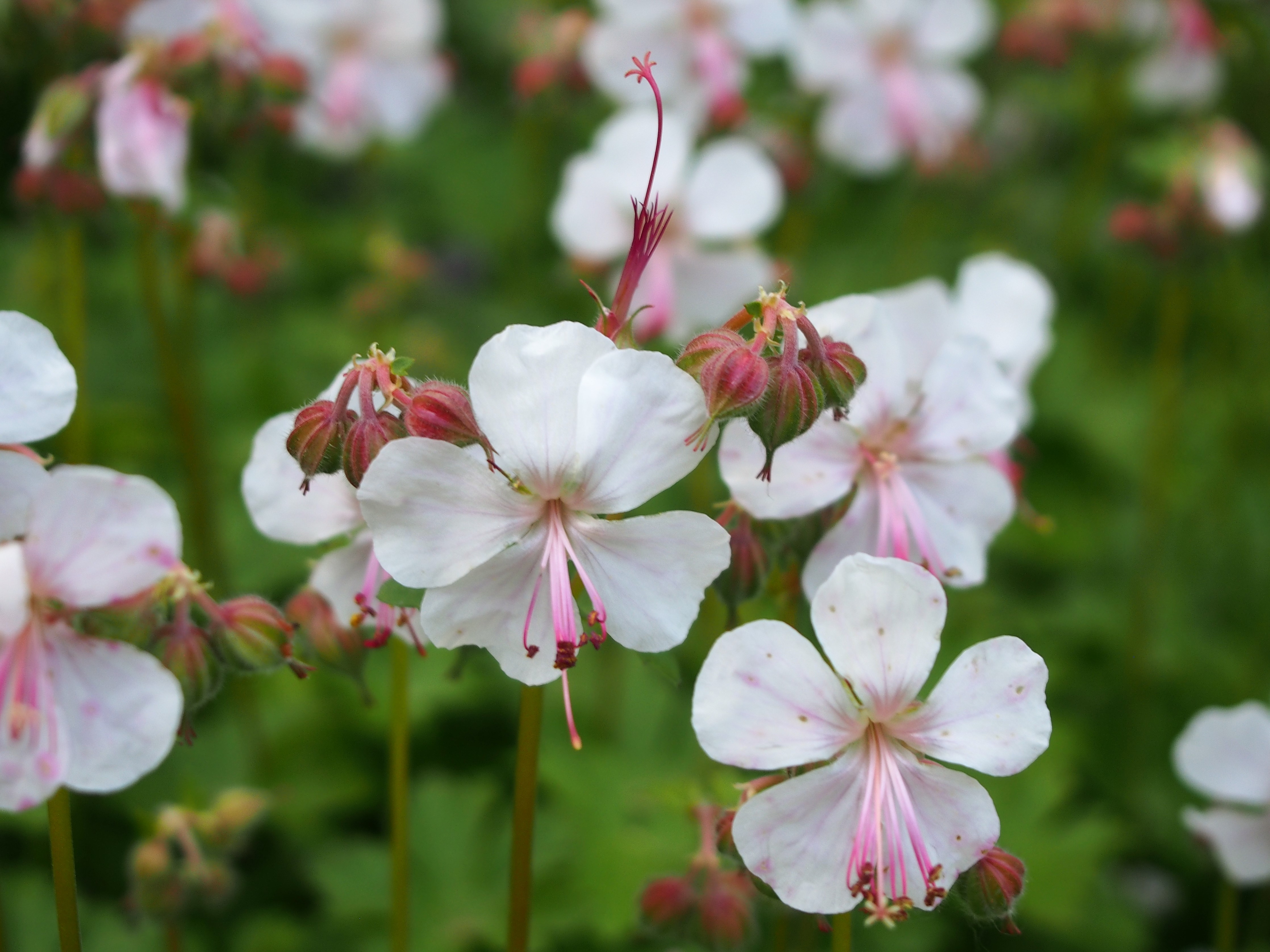

Scientific classification
- Kingdom: Plantae
- Clade: Tracheophytes
- Clade: Angiosperms
- Clade: Eudicots
- Clade: Rosids
- Order: Geraniales
- Family: Geraniaceae
- Genus: Geranium
- Species: G. × cantabrigiense

Binomial name
- Geranium × cantabrigiense P.F.Yeo

= Geranium × cantabrigiense =

Hybrid flowering plant

Geranium × cantabrigiense is a hybrid flowering plant in the cranesbill family Geraniaceae. It is an hybrid between Geranium dalmaticum and G. macrorrhizum.

== Etymology ==
The name cantabrigiense comes from Cantabrigia, the Latin name for Cambridge, England.

== Origin ==
Geranium × cantabrigiense was originally obtained in cultivation in 1974, when Dr. Helen Kiefer of the Cambridge University Botanic Garden used pollen of G. dalmaticum to fertilise G. macrorrhizum. The resulting plant is sterile, producing long-lasting pink flowers that do not set seed, but spreads vegetatively through trailing stems.

This hybrid has since been found in the wild, having formed through natural hybridisation where both parents co-occur. One naturally occurring form discovered in the Biokovo mountains of Croatia has been introduced in cultivation as the cultivar 'Biokovo'.
