= Dubrava, Dubrovnik-Neretva County =

Dubrava
- Settlement
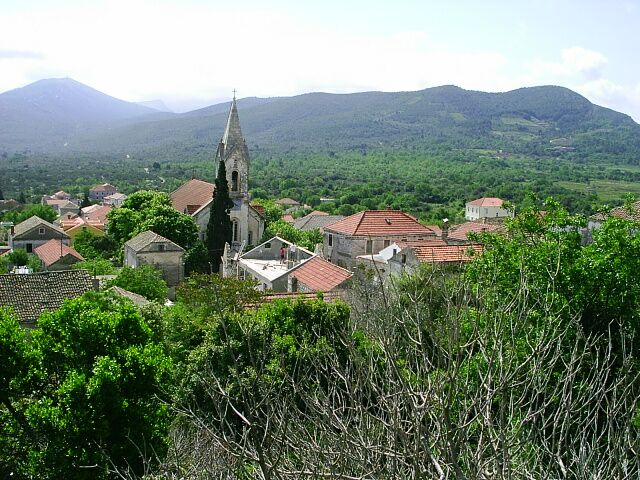
- Town of Pelješka Dubrava at Pelješac peninsula, Croatia

- Location within Croatia
- Coordinates: 42.886368°N 17.503912°E
- Country: Croatia
- County: Dubrovnik-Neretva County
- Municipality: Ston

Area
  - Total: 5.1 sq mi (13.2 km^{2})

Population (2021)
  - Total: 161
  - Density: 31.6/sq mi (12.2/km^{2})
- Time zone: UTC+1 (CET)
  - Summer (DST): UTC+2 (CEST)
- Postal code: 20230 Ston

Dubrava is a village on the Pelješac peninsula in Croatia. It is connected by the D414 highway.

== Demographics ==
According to the 2021 census, its population was 161. It was 133 in 2011.
