= D120 road =

Road in Croatia

D120 state road

Route information
- Length: 42.9 km (26.7 mi)

Major junctions
- From: Pomena
- D123 in Sobra
- To: Saplunara

Location
- Country: Croatia
- Counties: Dubrovnik-Neretva

Highway system
- Highways in Croatia

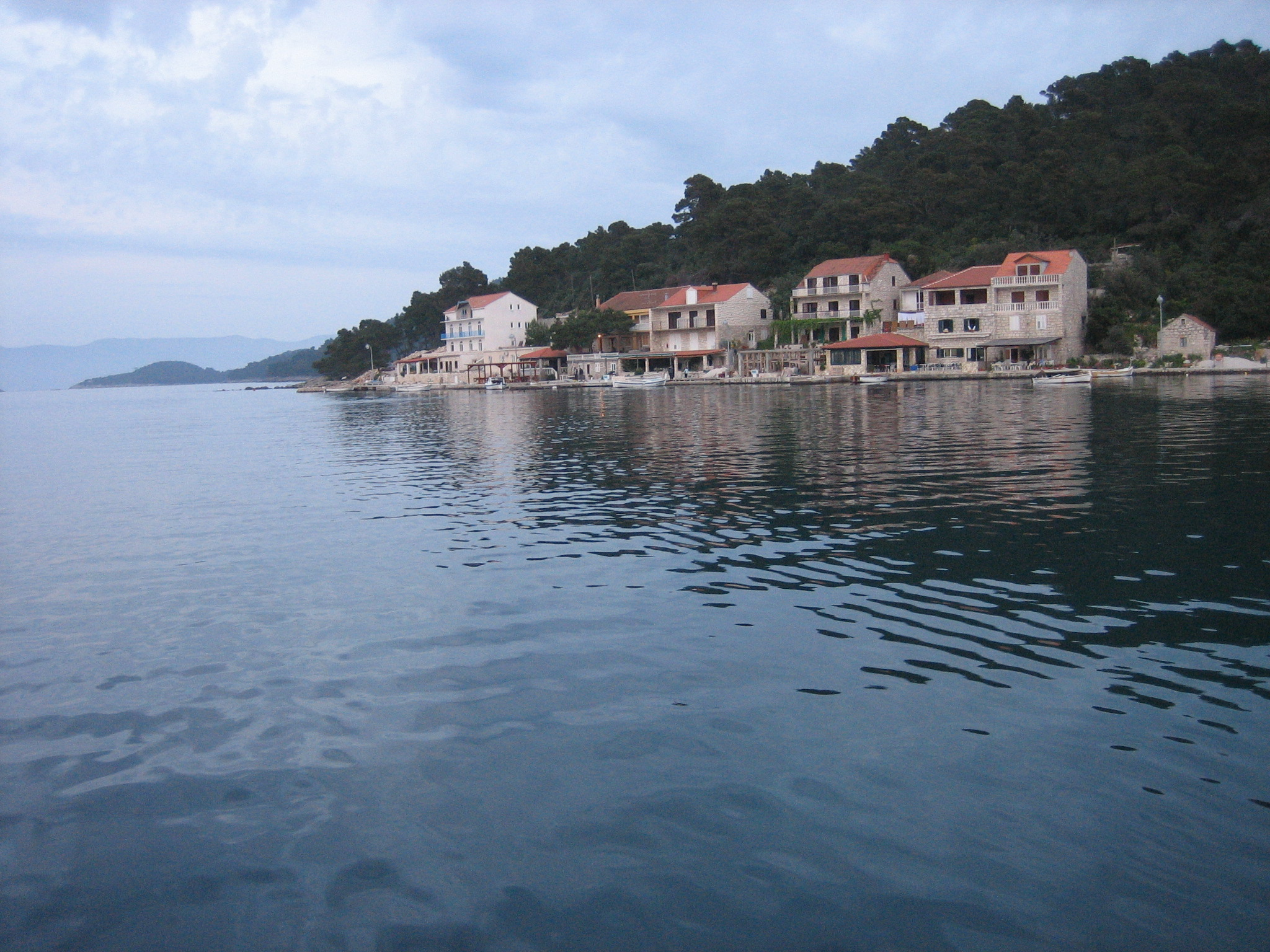
Pomena, at the western terminus of the D120 road

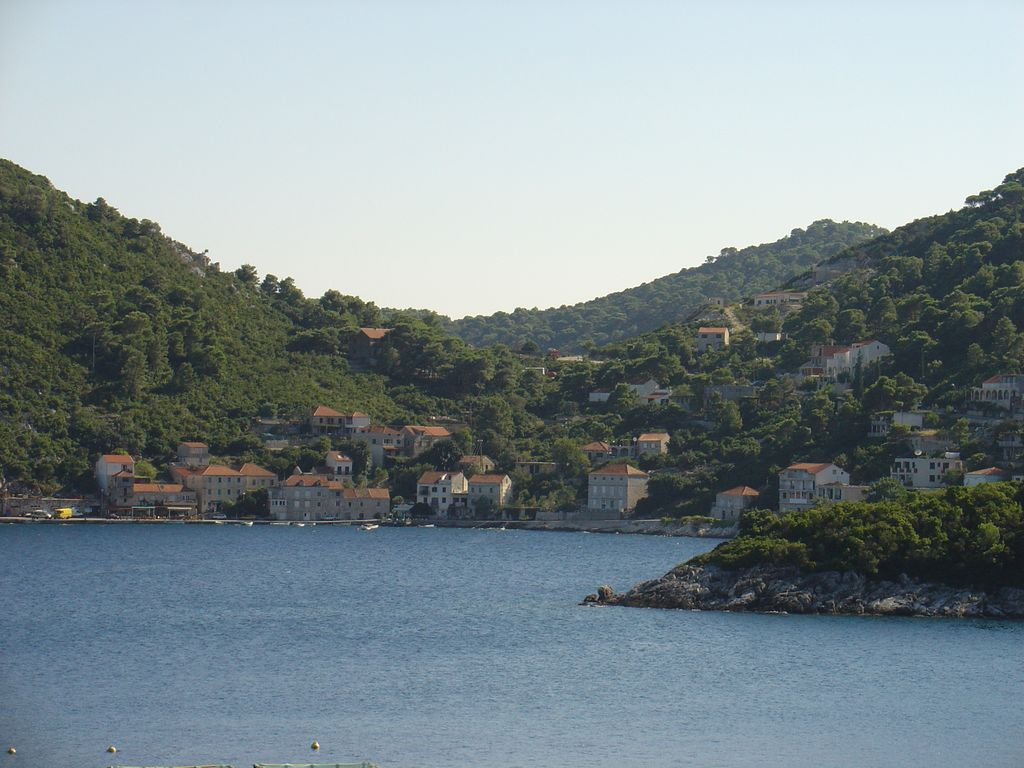
Sobra, on the D120 road route

D120 is the main state road on island of Mljet in Croatia connecting Mljet National Park and resorts on the island to Sobra and the ferry port in the town, from where Jadrolinija ferries sail to the mainland, docking in Prapratno and the D416 state road. The road is 42.9 km (26.7 mi) long.

The road, as well as all other state roads in Croatia, is managed and maintained by Hrvatske ceste, a state-owned company.

== Traffic volume ==
Traffic is regularly counted and reported by Hrvatske ceste (HC), operator of the road. Substantial variations between annual (AADT) and summer (ASDT) traffic volumes are attributed to the fact that the road connects a number of island resorts to the mainland.

D120 traffic volume
Road	Counting site	AADT	ASDT	Notes
D120	6504 Babino Polje	308	646	Adjacent to the D123 junction.

== Road junctions and populated areas ==
D120 junctions/populated areas
Type	Slip roads/Notes
	Pomena; The western terminus of the road.
	Polače
	L69037 to Blato and Kozarica.
	Babino Polje
	Sobra; D123 to Sobra ferry port – access to the mainland port of Prapratno (by Jadrolinija) and the D416 state road.
	Prožura
	Maranovići; L69070 to Okuklje.
	Saplunara; The eastern terminus of the road.
