= D118 road =

Road in Croatia

D118 state road

Route information
- Length: 43.5 km (27.0 mi)

Major junctions
- From: Vela Luka ferry port
- To: Korčula ferry port

Location
- Country: Croatia
- Counties: Dubrovnik-Neretva
- Major cities: Vela Luka, Korčula

Highway system
- Highways in Croatia

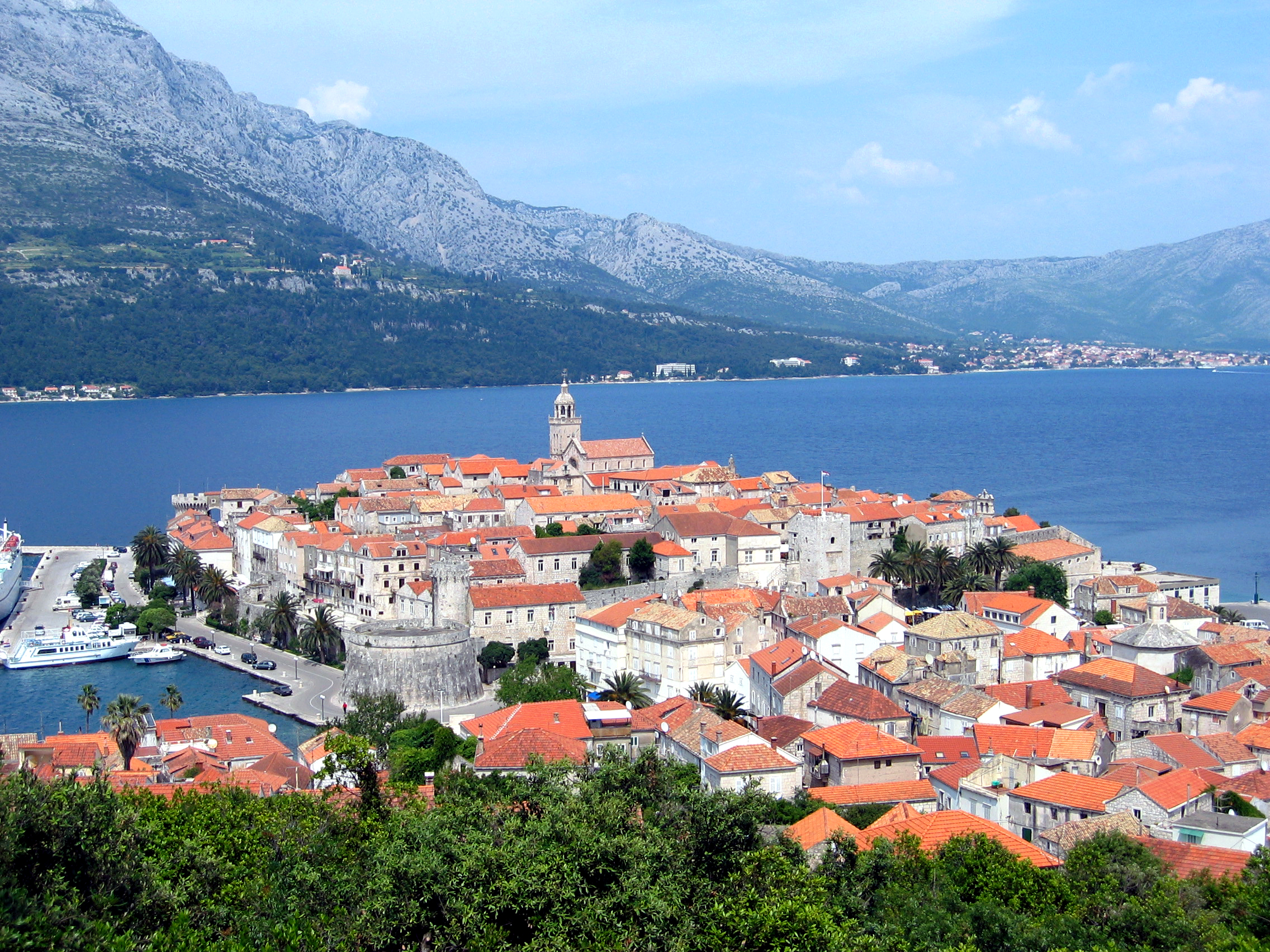
Korčula, at the eastern terminus of the D118 road

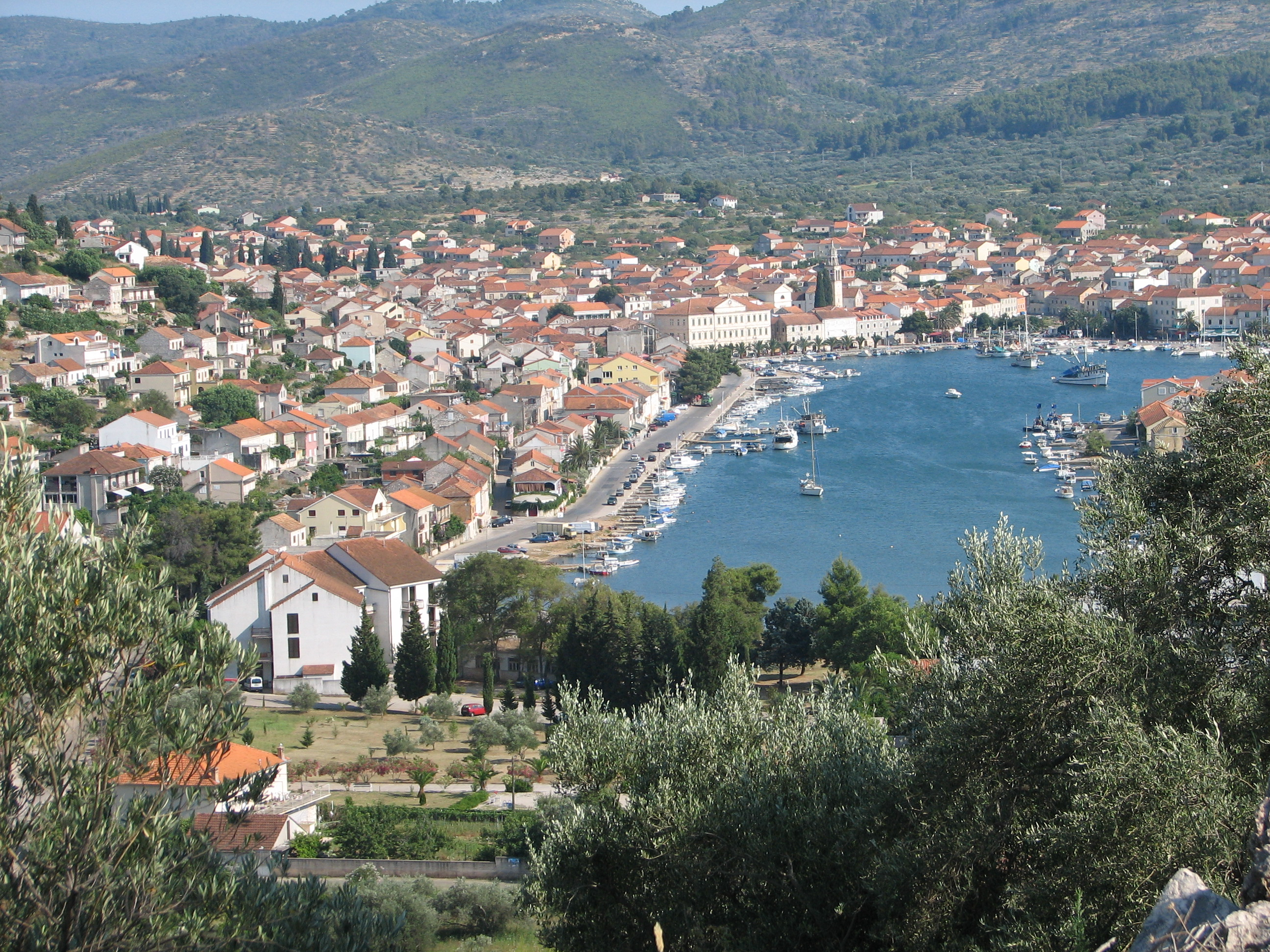
Vela Luka, at the western terminus the D118 road

D118 is the main state road on island of Korčula in Croatia connecting towns of Vela Luka and Korčula and ferry ports in those two towns, from where Jadrolinija ferries fly to the mainland, docking in Split and the D410 state road (from Vela Luka) and Orebić and the D414 state road (from Korčula). The road is 43.5 km (27.0 mi) long.

The road, as well as all other state roads in Croatia, is managed and maintained by Hrvatske ceste, a state-owned company.

== Traffic volume ==
Traffic is regularly counted and reported by Hrvatske ceste (HC), operator of the road. Substantial variations between annual (AADT) and summer (ASDT) traffic volumes are attributed to the fact that the road connects a number of island resorts to the mainland.

D118 traffic volume
Road	Counting site	AADT	ASDT	Notes
D118	6301 Korčula - west	1,766	3,427	Adjacent to the Ž6244 junction.

== Road junctions and populated areas ==
D118 junctions/populated areas
Type	Slip roads/Notes
	Vela Luka ferry port – access to the mainland port of Split (by Jadrolinija) and D410 to Split and A1 motorway Dugopolje interchange. The western terminus of the road.
	Vela Luka; Ž6221 to Plitvine.
	Ž6222 to Blato. The road loops to the town and back forming two intersections with the D118.
	Ž6222 to Blato. The second intersection of the D118 and Ž6222 roads.
	Ž6268 to Smokvica and Čara. The road loops to the two towns and back forming two intersections with the D118.
	Ž6268 to Čara and Smokvica. The second intersection of the D118 and Ž6268 roads.
	Pupnat
	Žrnovo
	Ž6225 to Lumbarda.
	Korčula; Ž6224 to Račišće. Ž6244 to the port.
	Korčula ferry port – access to the mainland port of Orebić (by Jadrolinija) and D414 to Ploče (via the D415) and Dubrovnik (via the D8 state road); The eastern terminus of the road.
