= Popova Luka =

- Village
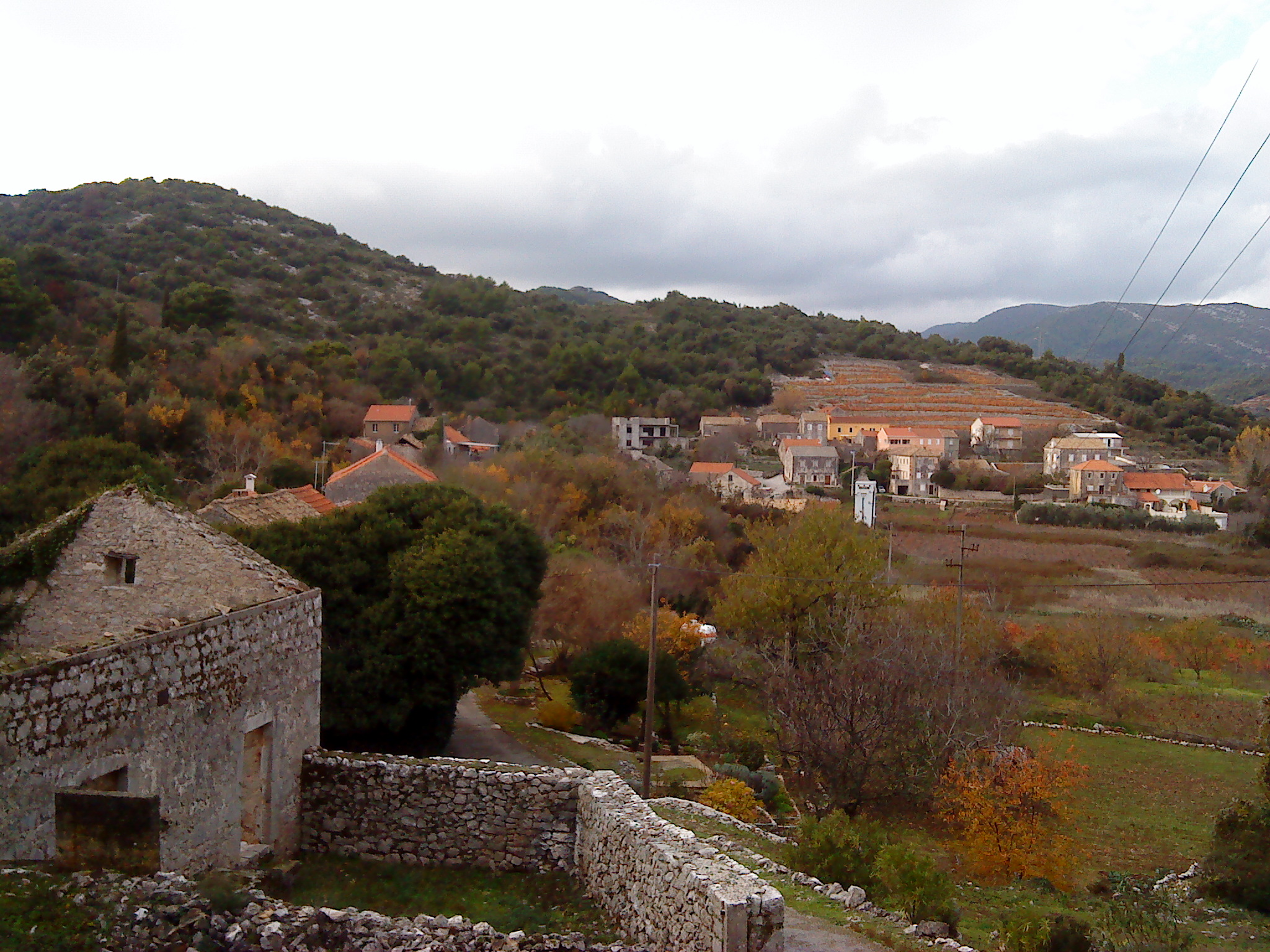
- View of the Village of Popova Luka

- Location within Croatia
- Country: Croatia
- County: Dubrovnik-Neretva County
- Municipality: Janjina

Area
  - Total: 2.7 sq mi (7.1 km^{2})

Population (2021)
  - Total: 20
  - Density: 7.3/sq mi (2.8/km^{2})
- Time zone: UTC+1 (CET)
  - Summer (DST): UTC+2 (CEST)

Popova Luka is a village in Croatia, located on the Pelješac peninsula. It is connected by the D414 highway.

== Demographics ==
According to the 2021 census, its population was 20.
