= Boljenovići =

- Settlement
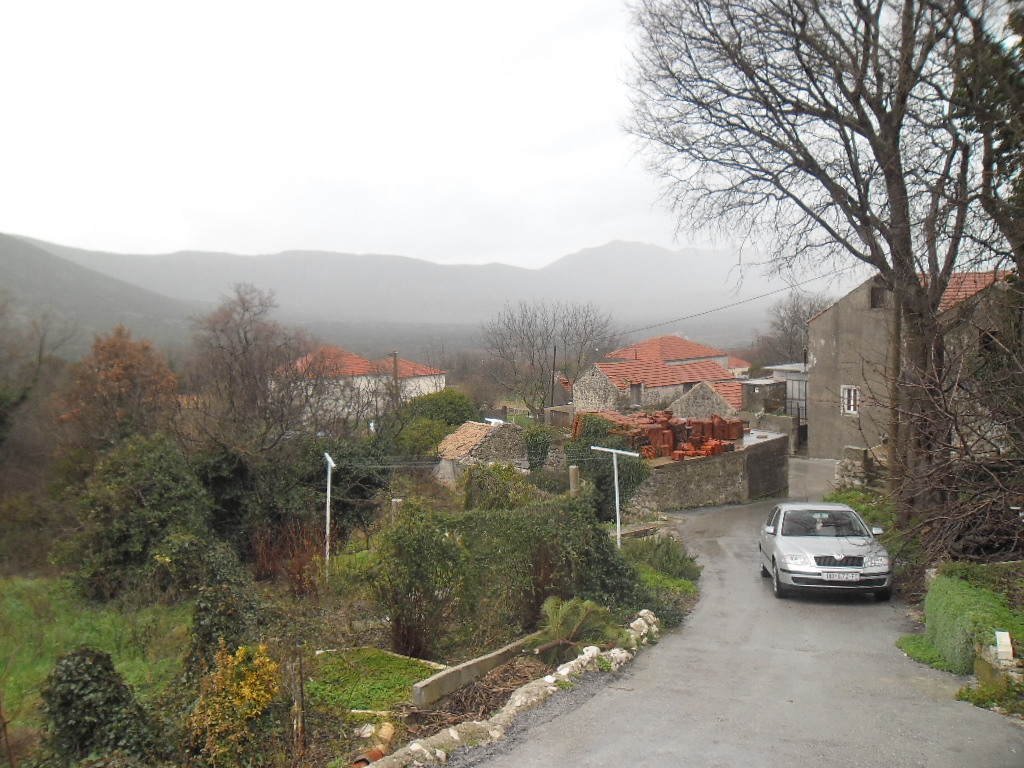

- Location within Croatia
- Coordinates: 42°50′53″N 17°37′30″E
- Country: Croatia
- County: Dubrovnik-Neretva County
- Municipality: Ston

Area
  - Total: 0.77 sq mi (2.0 km^{2})

Population (2021)
  - Total: 85
  - Density: 110/sq mi (43/km^{2})
- Time zone: UTC+1 (CET)
  - Summer (DST): UTC+2 (CEST)
- Postal code: 20230 Ston

Boljenovići is a village in Croatia. It is located along the D414 state road in the south of the country. Administratively Boljenovići are part of the Ston municipality within the Dubrovnik-Neretva County.

American bare-knuckle boxer Nick Burley (Nicholas Barovich), Heavyweight Champion of the Yukon Territory in 1902, comes from this village.

== Demographics ==
According to the 2021 census, its population was 85. It was 94 in 2001.
