= Pijavičino =

- Village
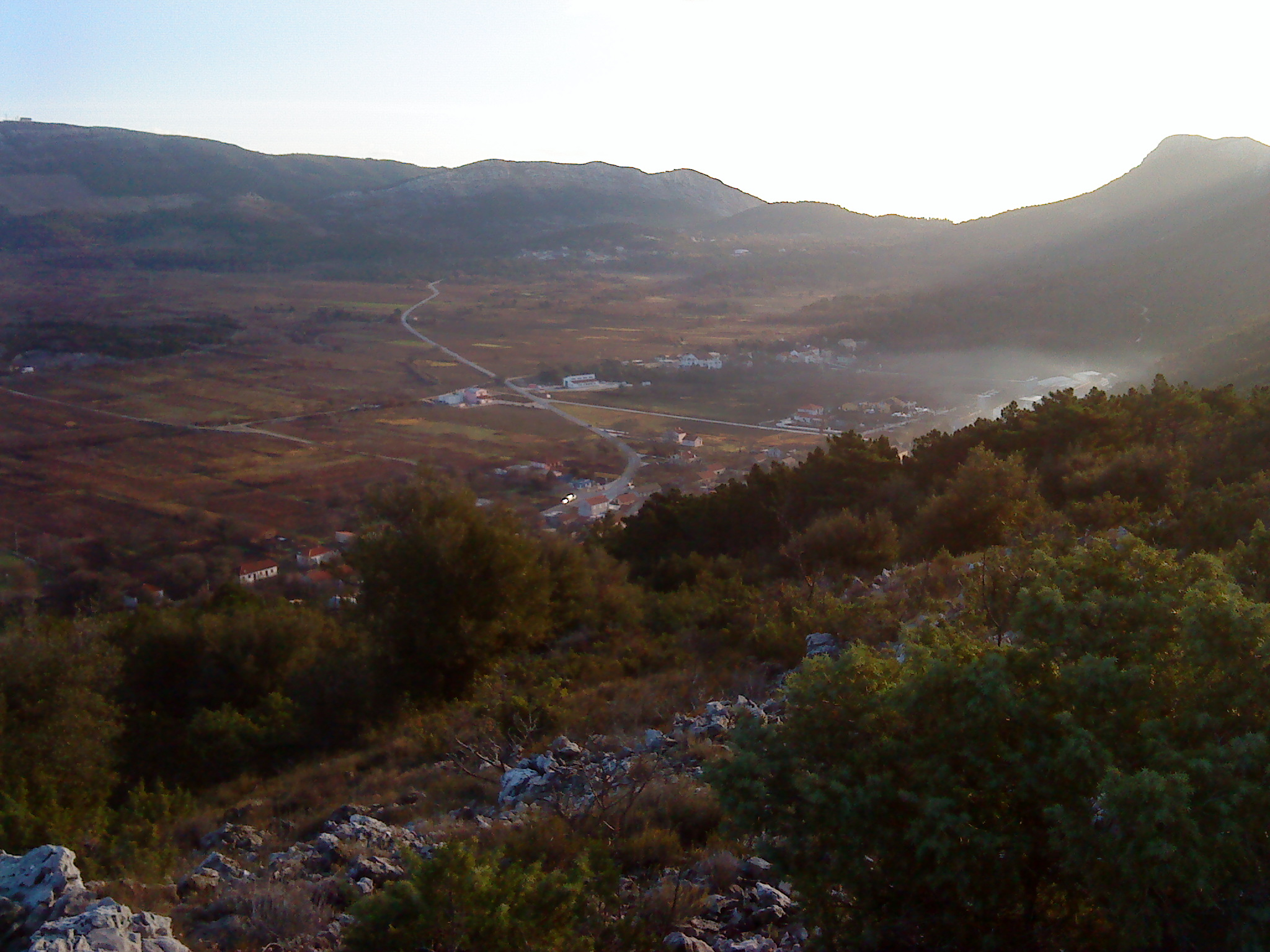
- Panorama photo of Potomje and Pijavičino

- Location within Croatia
- Country: Croatia
- County: Dubrovnik-Neretva County
- Municipality: Orebić

Area
  - Total: 4.9 sq mi (12.7 km^{2})

Population (2021)
  - Total: 94
  - Density: 19/sq mi (7.4/km^{2})
- Time zone: UTC+1 (CET)
  - Summer (DST): UTC+2 (CEST)

Pijavičino is a village in Croatia. It is connected by the D414 highway.

== Demographics ==
According to the 2021 census, its population was 94.
