= Putniković =

- Village
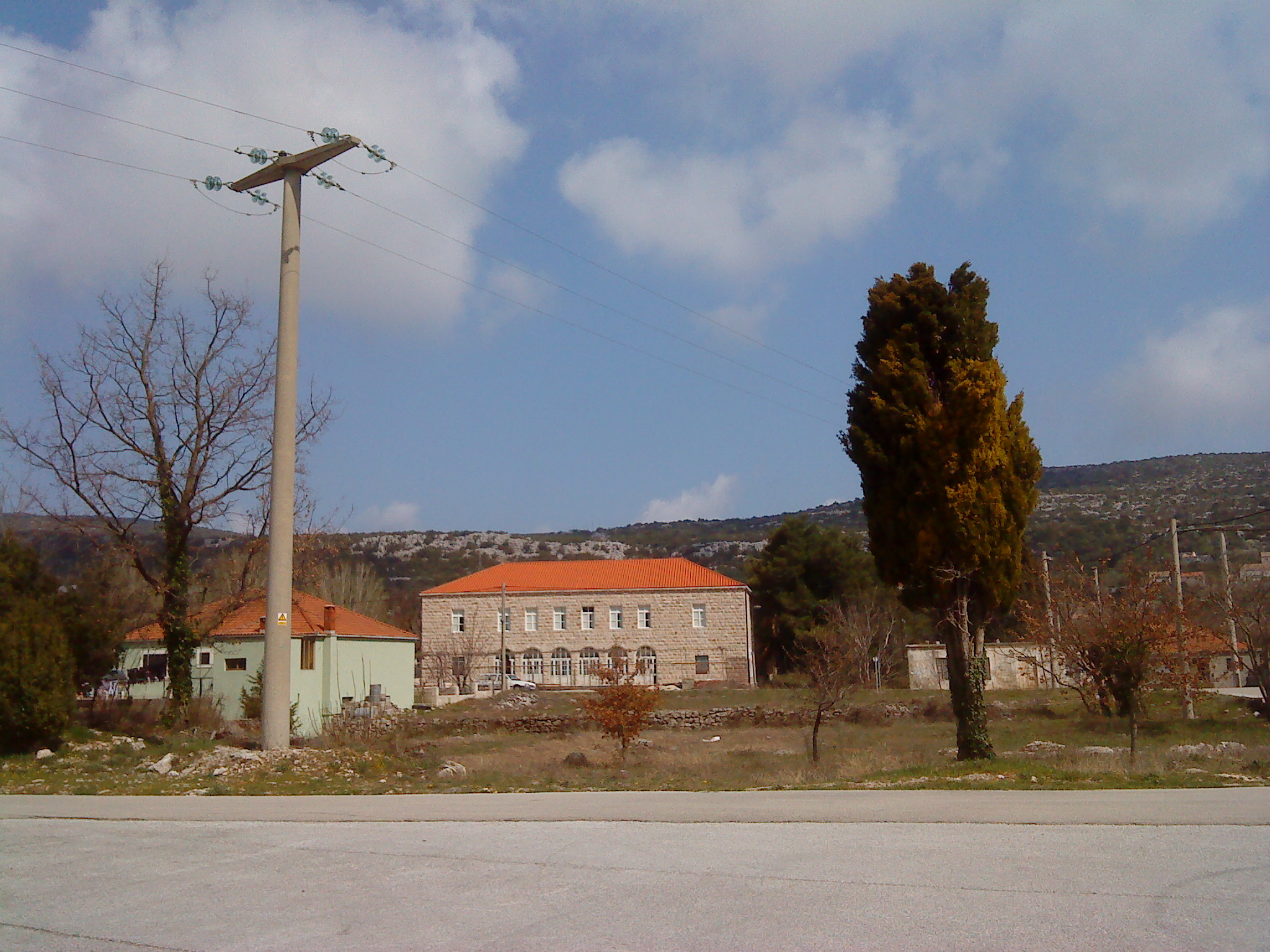

- Location within Croatia
- Country: Croatia
- County: Dubrovnik-Neretva County
- Municipality: Ston

Area
  - Total: 5.1 sq mi (13.2 km^{2})

Population (2021)
  - Total: 90
  - Density: 18/sq mi (6.8/km^{2})
- Time zone: UTC+1 (CET)
  - Summer (DST): UTC+2 (CEST)

Putniković is a village in Croatia. It is connected by the D414 highway.

== Demographics ==
According to the 2021 census, its population was 90.
