= Viganj =

- Village
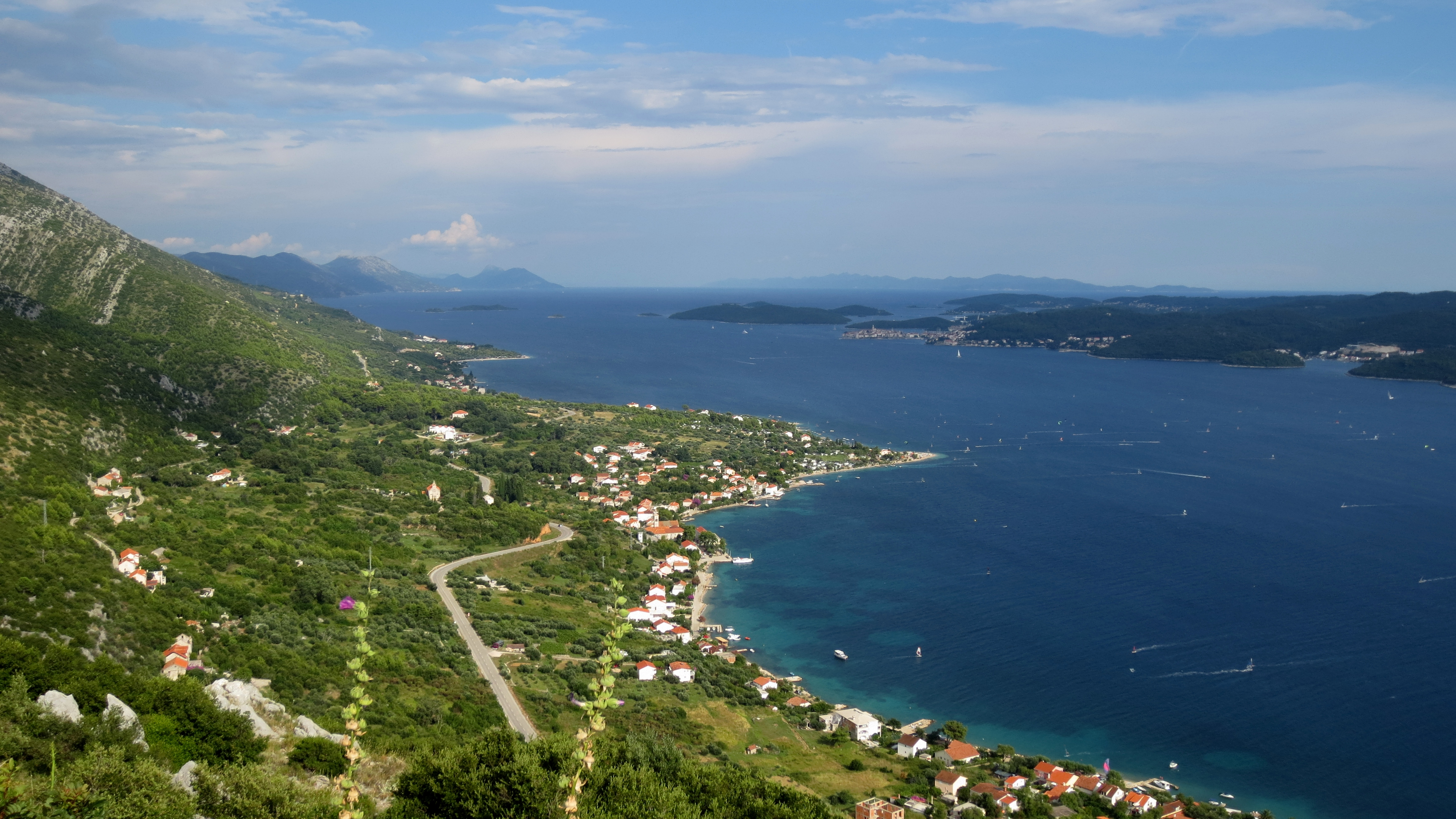
- Viganj lies in the Pelješac channel that separates Pelješac from Korčula
- Interactive map of Viganj
- Location within Croatia
- Coordinates: 42°59′02″N 17°05′58″E
- Country: Croatia
- County: Dubrovnik-Neretva County
- Municipality: Orebić

Area
  - Total: 2.9 sq mi (7.6 km^{2})

Population (2021)
  - Total: 236
  - Density: 80/sq mi (31/km^{2})
- Time zone: UTC+1 (CET)
  - Summer (DST): UTC+2 (CEST)

Viganj (lit. 'forge, bellows') is a village located in the west of the Pelješac peninsula in southern Dalmatia, Croatia, by the Adriatic Sea, between Nakovana and Kućište.

Because the Maestral wind is common in summer time, Viganj is a tourist resort known for its windsurfing opportunities. Windsurfing competitions are regularly held in Viganj.

A Dominican convent in the village dates to 1671.

== Demographics ==
According to the 2021 census, its population was 236. It had a population of 283 in 2011.
