= Petar Šegedin (writer) =

Croatian writer

- Born: 8 July 1909; Žrnovo, Dalmatia, Austria-Hungary (modern Croatia)
- Died: 1 September 1998; Zagreb, Croatia
- Writing career
- Genres: socialist realism, existentialism
- Notable work: Children of God (Djeca božja)
- Notable awards: Vladimir Nazor Award for Life Achievement in Literature (laureate)

Petar Šegedin (Croatian pronunciation: [pětar ʃêgediːn], 8 July 1909 – 1 September 1998) was a Croatian writer.

Šegedin was born in Žrnovo, on the island of Korčula. He finished elementary school education in Žrnovo, first grades of the high school in Korčula and teacher's college in Dubrovnik. He graduated from the Faculty of Humanities and Social Sciences, University of Zagreb. He worked as a professor and diplomat, and later as a professional writer. In 1964 he became a member of the Yugoslav Academy of Sciences and Arts. In the 1970s he was blacklisted due to his criticism of the communist authorities, and lived for a while in a self-imposed exile in Germany.

From his debut novel Children of God (Djeca božja), published in 1946, Šegedin's work broke away from socialist realism and introduced existentialism into Croatian literature. He is also noted for his essays and travelogues.

Šegedin served as a president of Matica hrvatska and the Croatian Writers' Association. He was a full member of the Croatian Academy of Sciences and Arts since 1963. Šegedin is the 1991 laureate of the Vladimir Nazor Award for Life Achievement in Literature.

== Sources ==
- Umro Petar Šegedin (in Croatian)
- Petar Šegedin (1909 - 1998) (in Croatian)
- Deceased members
- Ljetopis Petra Šegedina (in Croatian)
- Bibliografija (in Croatian)
- Šegedin, Petar (in Croatian)

Cultural offices
Preceded by Ljudevit Jonke	President of Matica hrvatska 1990	Succeeded by Vlado Gotovac
