= D415 road =

Road in Croatia

D415 state road

Route information
- Length: 7.2 km (4.5 mi)

Major junctions
- From: D414 in Donja Banda
- To: Trpanj ferry port

Location
- Country: Croatia
- Counties: Dubrovnik-Neretva
- Major cities: Trpanj

Highway system
- Highways in Croatia

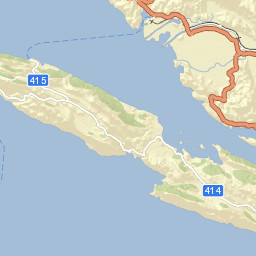
road 415 displayed on Pelješac map

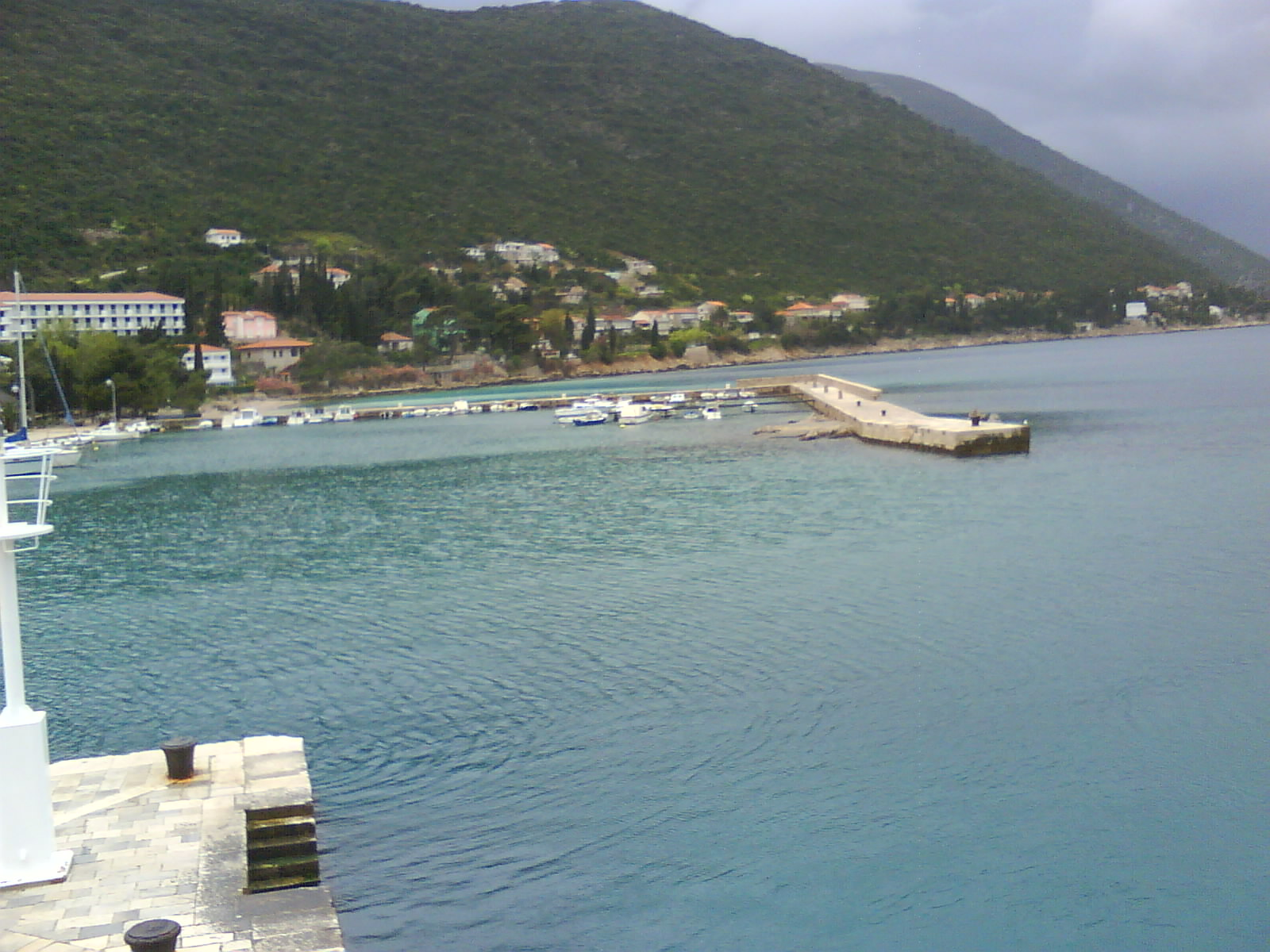
Trpanj, at the northern terminus of the D415 road

D415 branches off to the north from D414 in Donja Banda towards Trpanj ferry port - ferry access to Ploče on the mainland coast. The road is 7.2 km (4.5 mi) long.

The road, as well as all other state roads in Croatia, is managed and maintained by Hrvatske ceste, state owned company.

== Traffic volume ==
Traffic is not regularly counted on the road, however, Hrvatske ceste report number of vehicles using Trpanj-Ploče ferry line, connecting D415 to the D413 state road. Furthermore the D415 road carries some local traffic on Pelješac peninsula itself, which does use the ferry at all, substantially exceeding the ferried traffic. Substantial variations between annual (AADT) and summer (ASDT) traffic volumes are attributed to the fact that the road connects to a number of summer resorts.

D415 traffic volume
| Road | Counting site | AADT | ASDT | Notes |
| D415 | 633 Ploče-Trpanj | 143 | 383 | Vehicles using Ploče-Trpanj ferry line. |

== Road junctions and populated areas ==
D415 junctions/populated areas
| Type | Slip roads/Notes |
| | Donja Banda; D414 to Orebić (to the west) and to Ston and Dubrovnik (to the east). The southern terminus of the road. |
| | Trpanj |
| | Trpanj ferry port - ferry access to Ploče (D413). The northern terminus of the road. |
