= Sparagovići =

- Settlement
- Location within Croatia
- Country: Croatia
- County: Dubrovnik-Neretva County
- Municipality: Ston

Area
  - Total: 4.9 sq mi (12.6 km^{2})

Population (2021)
  - Total: 104
  - Density: 21.4/sq mi (8.25/km^{2})
- Time zone: UTC+1 (CET)
  - Summer (DST): UTC+2 (CEST)
- Postal code: 20230 Ston

Sparagovići is a village in the Ston municipality, Dubrovnik-Neretva County, Croatia. It is connected by the D414 highway.

== Demographics ==
According to the 2021 census, its population was 104.
