= Žrnovo =

- Village
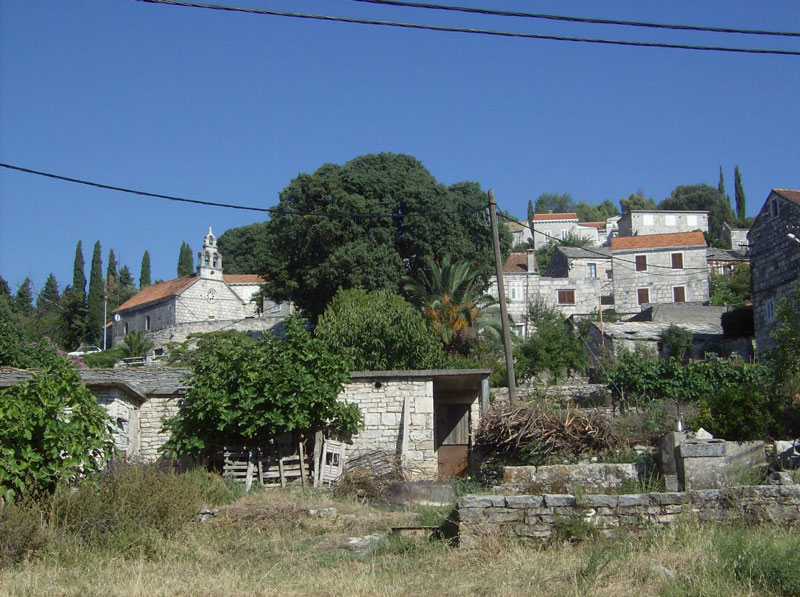

- Location within Croatia
- Coordinates: 42°57′N 17°07′E
- Country: Croatia
- County: Dubrovnik-Neretva County
- Municipality: Korčula

Area
  - Total: 13.1 sq mi (33.9 km^{2})

Population (2021)
  - Total: 1,401
  - Density: 107/sq mi (41.3/km^{2})
- Time zone: UTC+1 (CET)
  - Summer (DST): UTC+2 (CEST)

Žrnovo is a village on the island of Korčula in Croatia. Korčula is an island on the Dalmatian coast of the Adriatic Sea and administratively belongs to the Dubrovnik–Neretva County of Croatia. The village is situated four kilometers west of the old town of Korčula, on the D118 road.

Žrnovo is one of the oldest settlements on the island and is made up of four hamlets - Prvo Selo, Brdo, Kampus and Postrana. The village has numerous small churches.

== Demographics ==
According to the 2021 census, its population was 1,401. It had a population of 1,308 residents in 2001.

The well-known Croatian writer and academic Petar Šegedin (1909–1998). was born in Žrnovo.

== See also ==
- Kumpanija
- Korčula
