= Kućište, Croatia =

Kućište
- Village
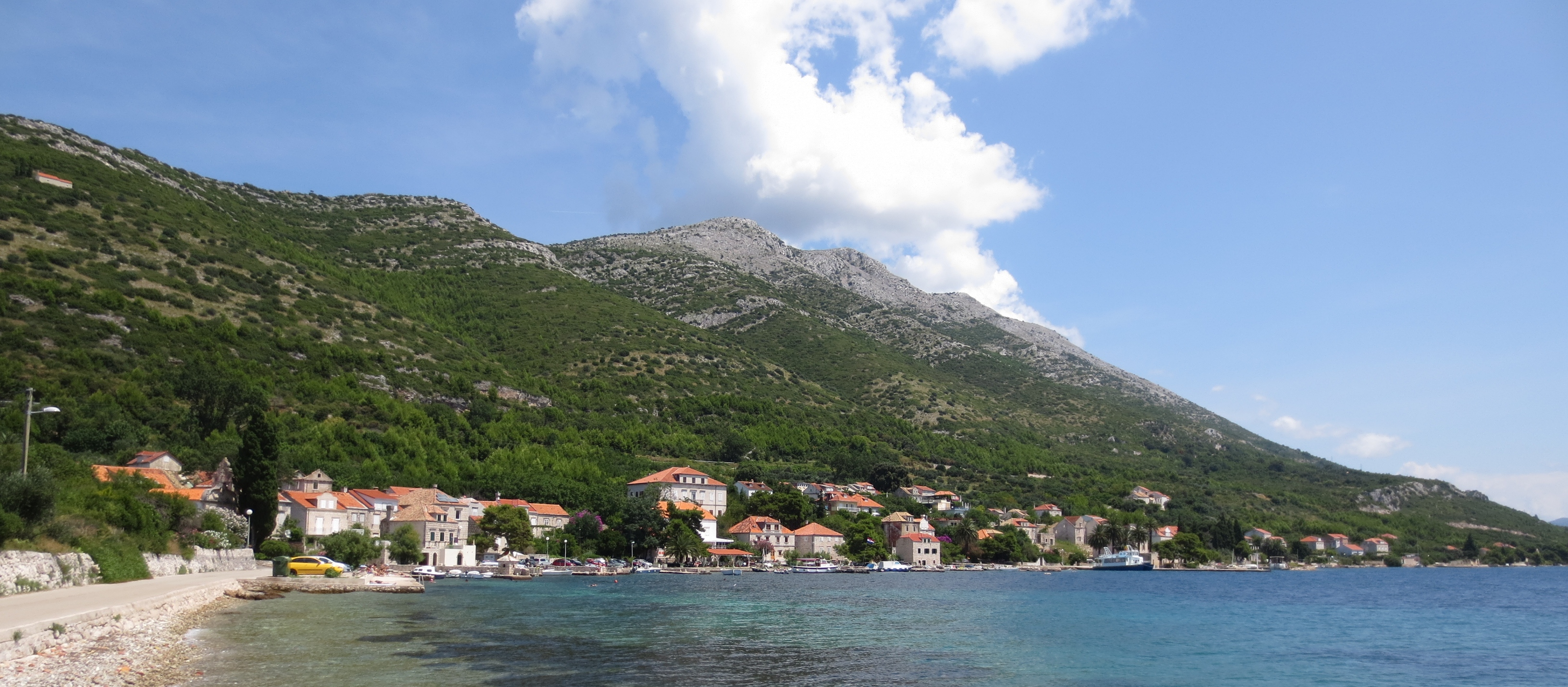
- View of village with church, post office and other main buildings
- Interactive map of Kućište
- Location within Croatia
- Country: Croatia
- County: Dubrovnik-Neretva County
- Municipality: Orebić

Area
  - Total: 2.5 sq mi (6.6 km^{2})

Population (2021)
  - Total: 173
  - Density: 68/sq mi (26/km^{2})
- Time zone: UTC+1 (CET)
  - Summer (DST): UTC+2 (CEST)

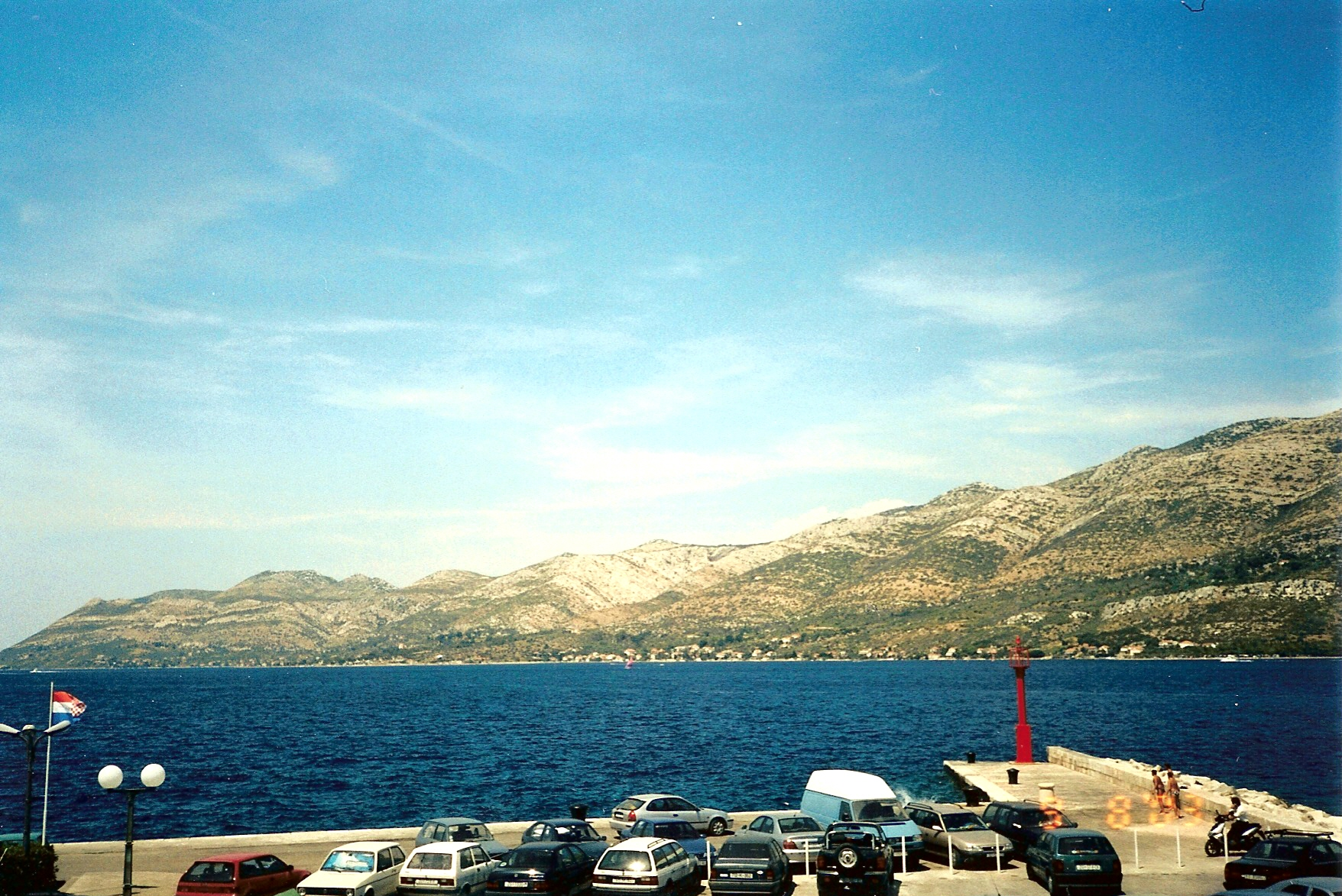
View from Korčula

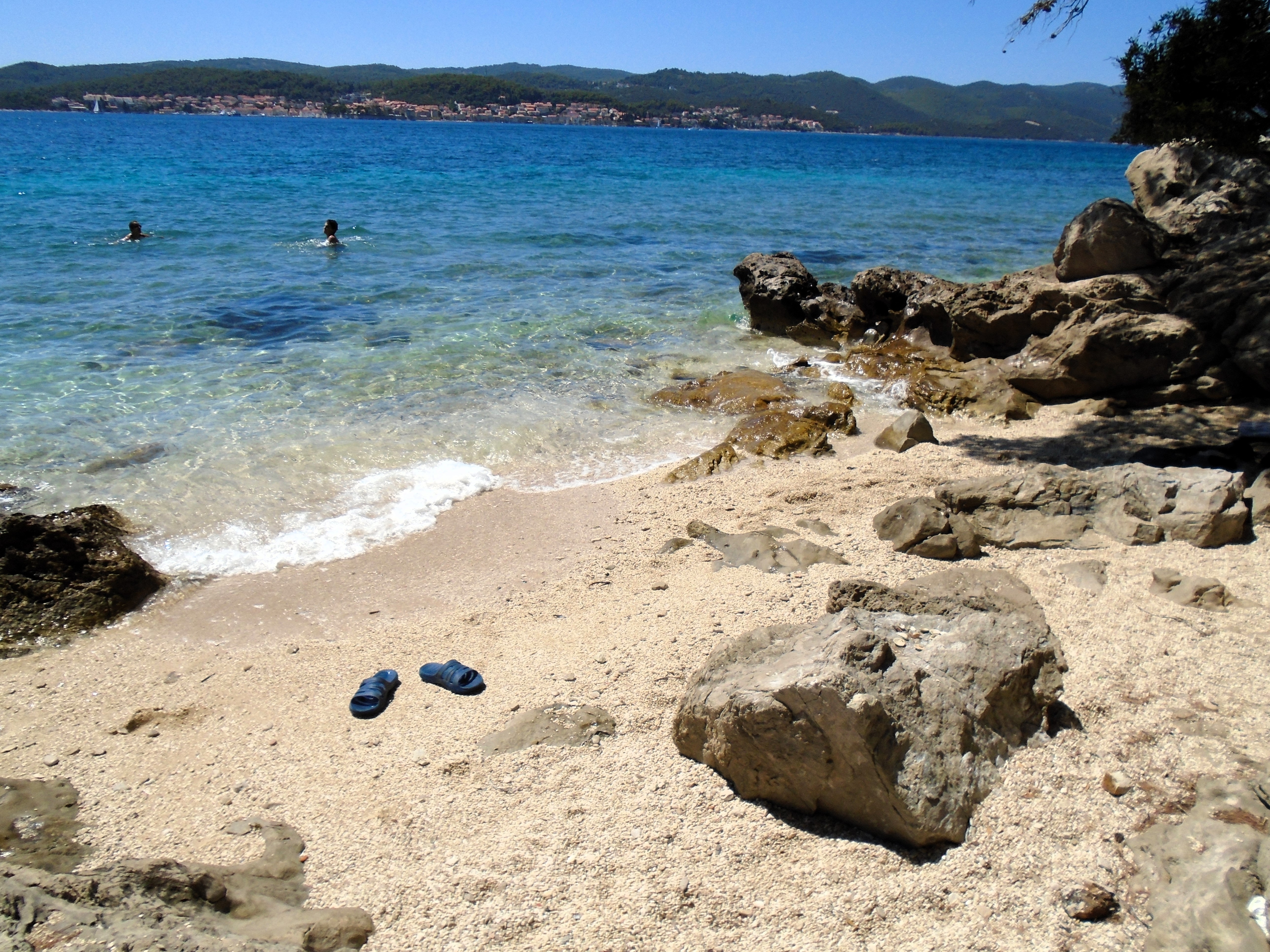
Small sand beach at village entrance

Kućište or Kučišće (lit. 'place of houses'; also written "Kučište") is a small village on the southern coast of the Pelješac peninsula in Dubrovnik-Neretva county (Dubrovačko-neretvanska županija), Croatia.

== Demographics ==
According to the 2021 census, its population was 173. It had a population of 204 in 2001.

The inhabitants have a long seafaring tradition, the income from which allowed them to build, for the time, the large, affluent, stone mansions characteristic of the area.

== Tourism ==
Main tourist attractions in Kućište include:

- Windsurfing
- Hiking (Mt Illya- Sveti Ilija- 961m)
- Illyrian artifacts (Nakovane)
- Summer sports

The hamlet of Perna is located in a separate cove to the east of Kućište.

== See also ==
- Korčula – 15 min. by ferry across the channel.
- Dubrovnik – less than 130 km to the southeast
- Viganj – windsurfing village within walking distance to the west
- Orebić – 5 km to the east
- Split – 2 hours away by hydrofoil from Korčula.
