= Nakovanj =

Nakovanj Nakovana
- Village
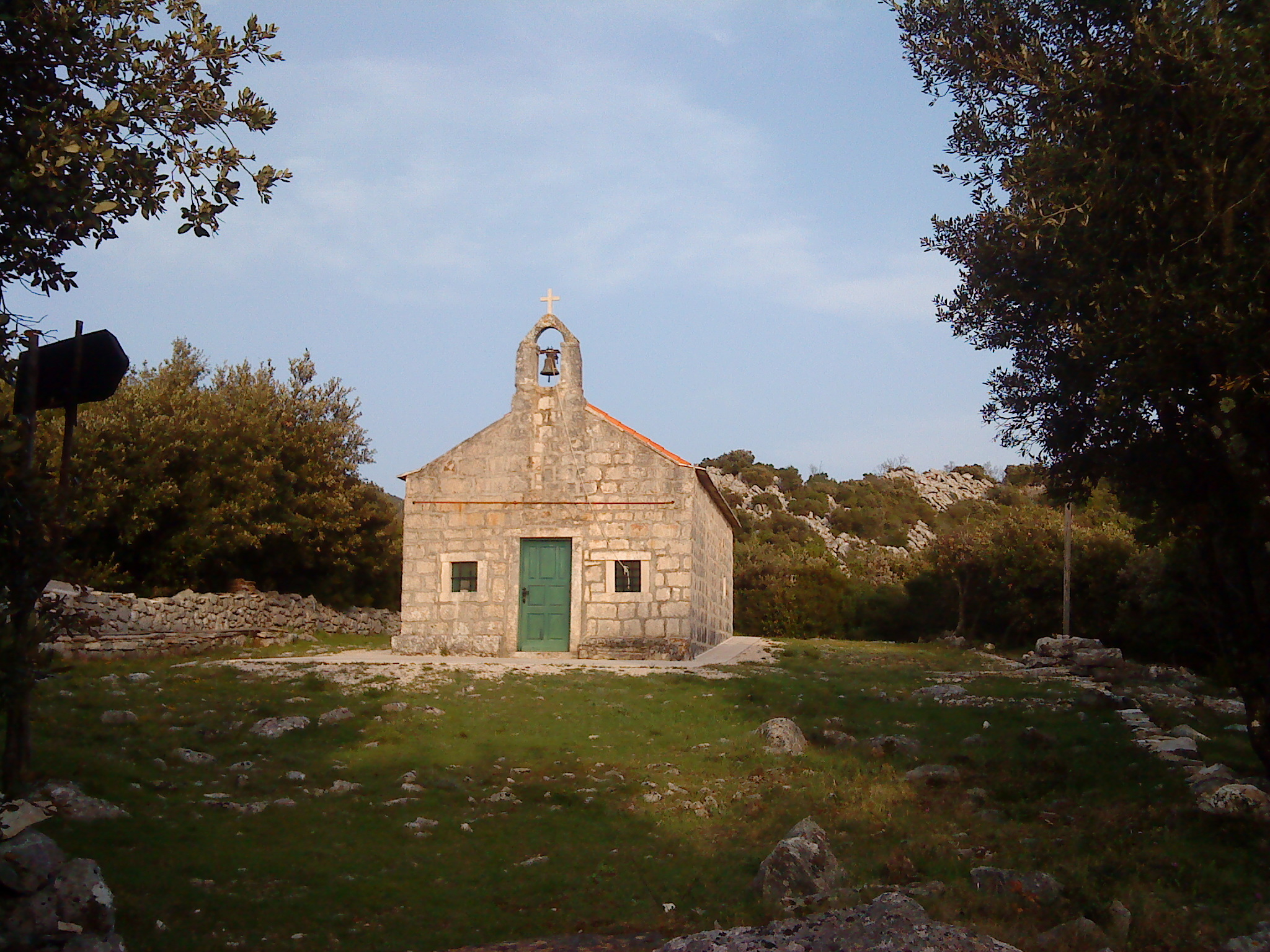
- Interactive map of Nakovanj
- Location within Croatia
- Country: Croatia
- County: Dubrovnik-Neretva County
- Municipality: Orebić

Area
  - Total: 6.7 sq mi (17.4 km^{2})

Population (2021)
  - Total: 1
  - Density: 0.15/sq mi (0.057/km^{2})
- Time zone: UTC+1 (CET)
  - Summer (DST): UTC+2 (CEST)

Nakovanj or Nakovana (lit. 'anvil') is a village located in the west of the Pelješac peninsula in southern Dalmatia, Croatia, on the inland part of the peninsula, by the road connecting Viganj and Lovište.

Nakovana is best known as an archeological site, as it has preserved artifacts indicating continuous human settlement over several millennia.

== Demographics ==
According to the 2021 census, its population was just 1. It was 3 in 2011.
