= Donja Banda =

- Village
- Interactive map of Donja Banda
- Location within Croatia
- Country: Croatia
- County: Dubrovnik-Neretva County
- Municipality: Orebić

Area
  - Total: 6.1 sq mi (15.9 km^{2})

Population (2021)
  - Total: 154
  - Density: 25.1/sq mi (9.69/km^{2})
- Time zone: UTC+1 (CET)
  - Summer (DST): UTC+2 (CEST)

Donja Banda is a village in Croatia, located on the Pelješac peninsula on the Dalmatian coast. It is connected by the D414 highway.

== Demographics ==
According to the 2021 census, its population was 154.
