= Lovište =

Lovište Lovišće
- Village
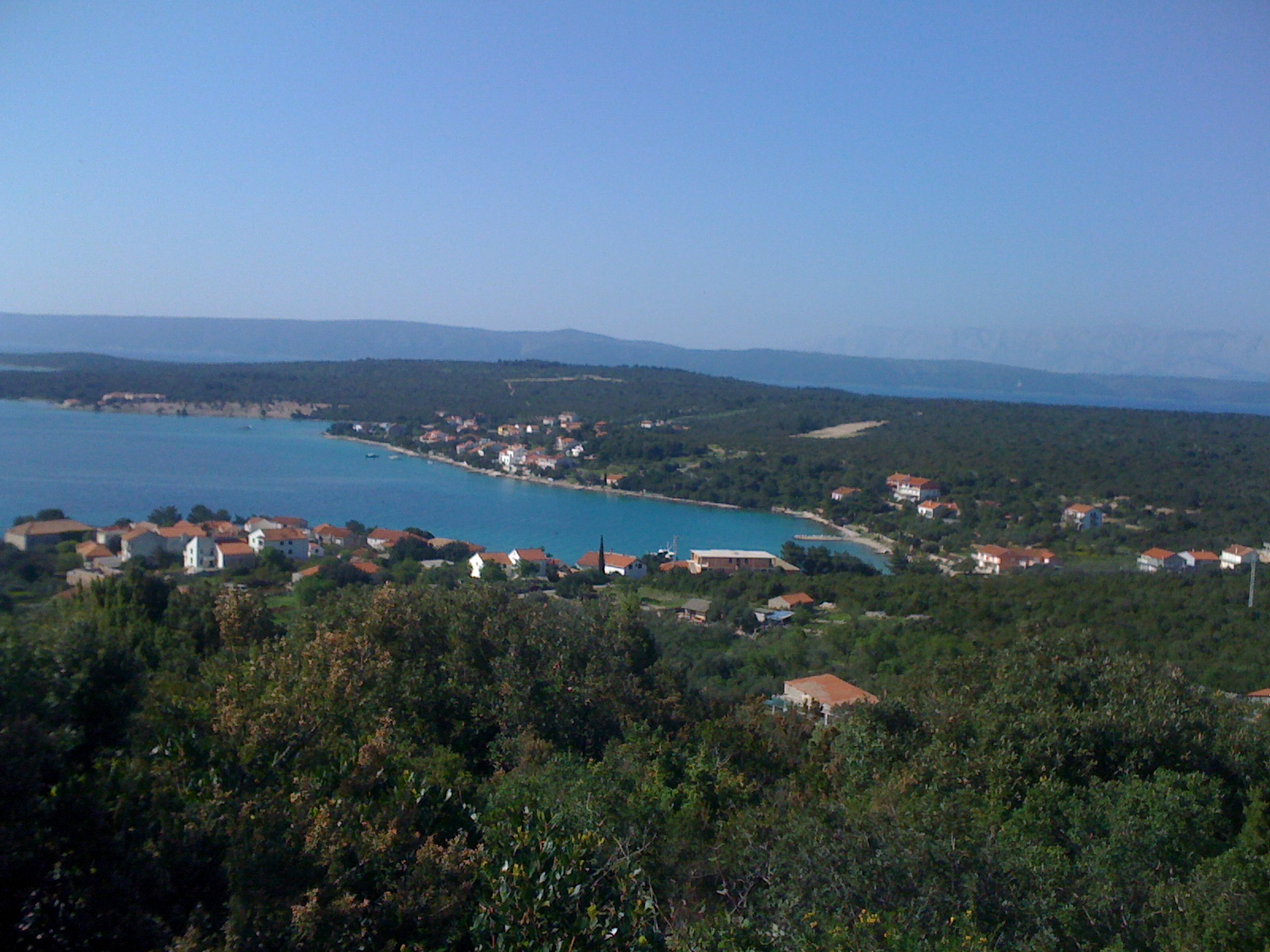
- View over town
- Interactive map of Lovište
- Location within Croatia
- Coordinates: 43°01′N 17°02′E
- Country: Croatia
- County: Dubrovnik-Neretva County
- Municipality: Orebić

Area
  - Total: 4.8 sq mi (12.5 km^{2})

Population (2021)
  - Total: 187
  - Density: 38.7/sq mi (15.0/km^{2})
- Time zone: UTC+1 (CET)
  - Summer (DST): UTC+2 (CEST)

Lovište or Lovišće is small seaside town located in a cove near the western tip of the Pelješac peninsula in the Dubrovnik-Neretva county in Croatia.

== History ==
Although the settlement was founded in the 19th century, this area was first mentioned on February 15, 1333 in two charters of Bosnian ban Stjepan II Kotromanić in which lands ceded to the Republic of Ragusa are described including the cape of Loište (Latin: Loyste).

Throughout history, Lovište has been recorded in various variants of its current name: on one map by Anto Kapor (Stato di Ragusi, Bocca di fiume Narenta, isola di Lessina e Curzola, Venice, 1690) this area is recorded under the names "Capo Louiscta" and " P. Louischia". Lovište, also as a cape, is also mentioned on a map of Herzegovina made by a lieutenant B. Vukasović in 1788 in Vienna.

Lovište was founded in 1885 by settlers from the area of the island of Hvar who chose emigrating to Pelješac. These residents were later joined by settlers from Nakovana. The first settler in Lovište (1878) was Ante Visković from the Hvar village of Gdinj.

The first church in Lovište was built in 1926, and the cemetery in 1935. The school was founded in 1928 and continues working to this day, with a brief interruption during the Second World War. The settlement got electricity in 1963.

As it is situated at the very end of the peninsula, it was isolated before a road to the town was built, connecting it to Nakovana and beyond in 1973. Until then, the village could only be supplied by sea.

The water supply system first reached Lovište in 1980.

Although small in size, it has recently drawn a number of tourists who prefer the isolated and calm nature of the town. The elderly refer to it by the name Lovišće, while the official form Lovište has been standardized. During the summer months Lovište is popular with people seeking a quieter place to spend their summer vacations.

== Demographics ==
In the 2011 census, it had a population of 228. In the 2021 census, its population was 187.
