= Saplunara =

- Village
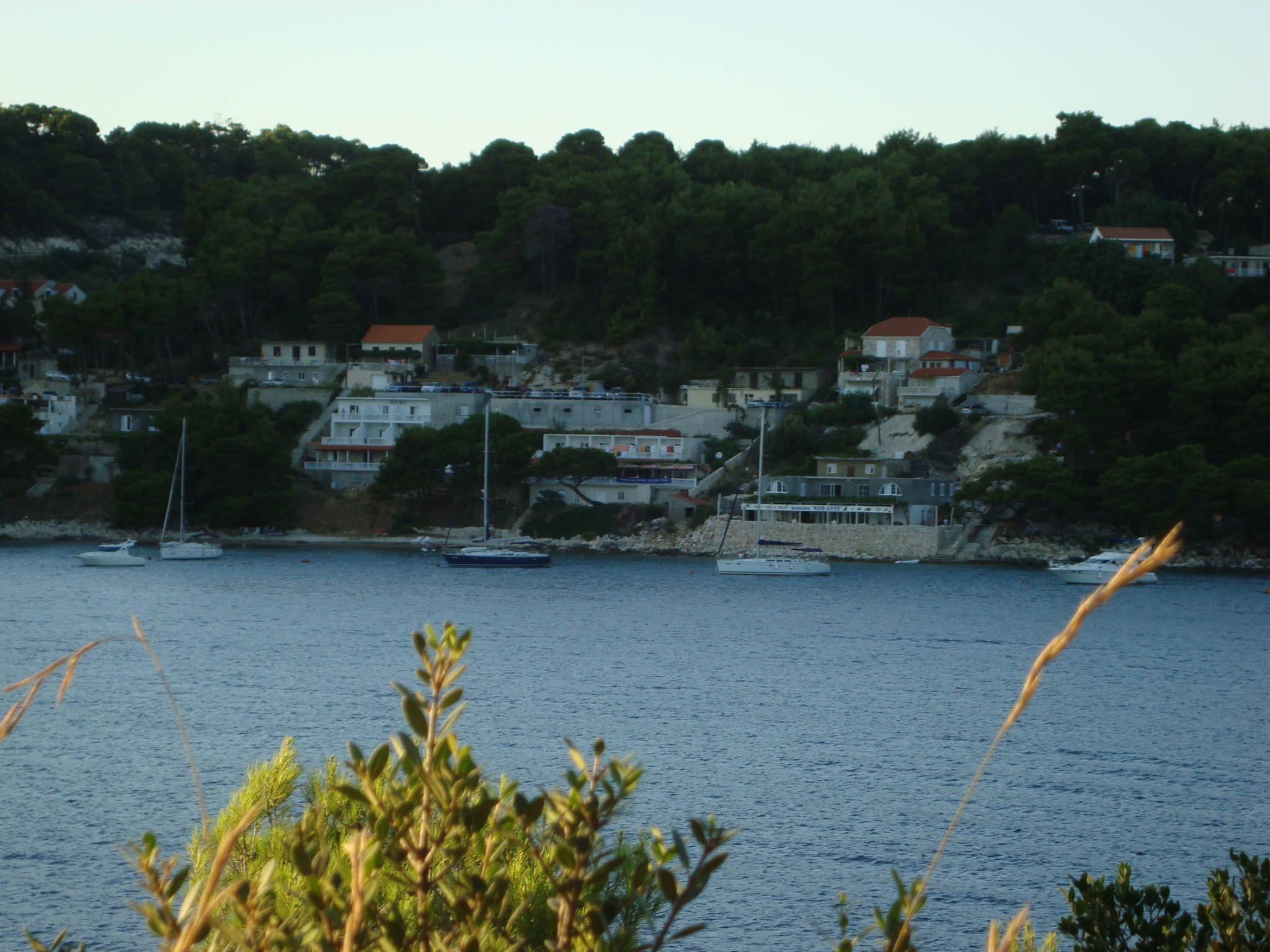
- a new tourist resort on the far east of the island of Mljet, Saplunara, Croatia

- Location within Croatia
- Country: Croatia
- County: Dubrovnik-Neretva County
- Municipality: Mljet

Area
  - Total: 0.81 sq mi (2.1 km^{2})

Population (2021)
  - Total: 83
  - Density: 100/sq mi (40/km^{2})
- Time zone: UTC+1 (CET)
  - Summer (DST): UTC+2 (CEST)

Saplunara is a village on the island of Mljet in southern Croatia. It is connected by the D120 highway.

== Demographics ==
According to the 2021 census, its population was 83.
