= Pomena =

- Village
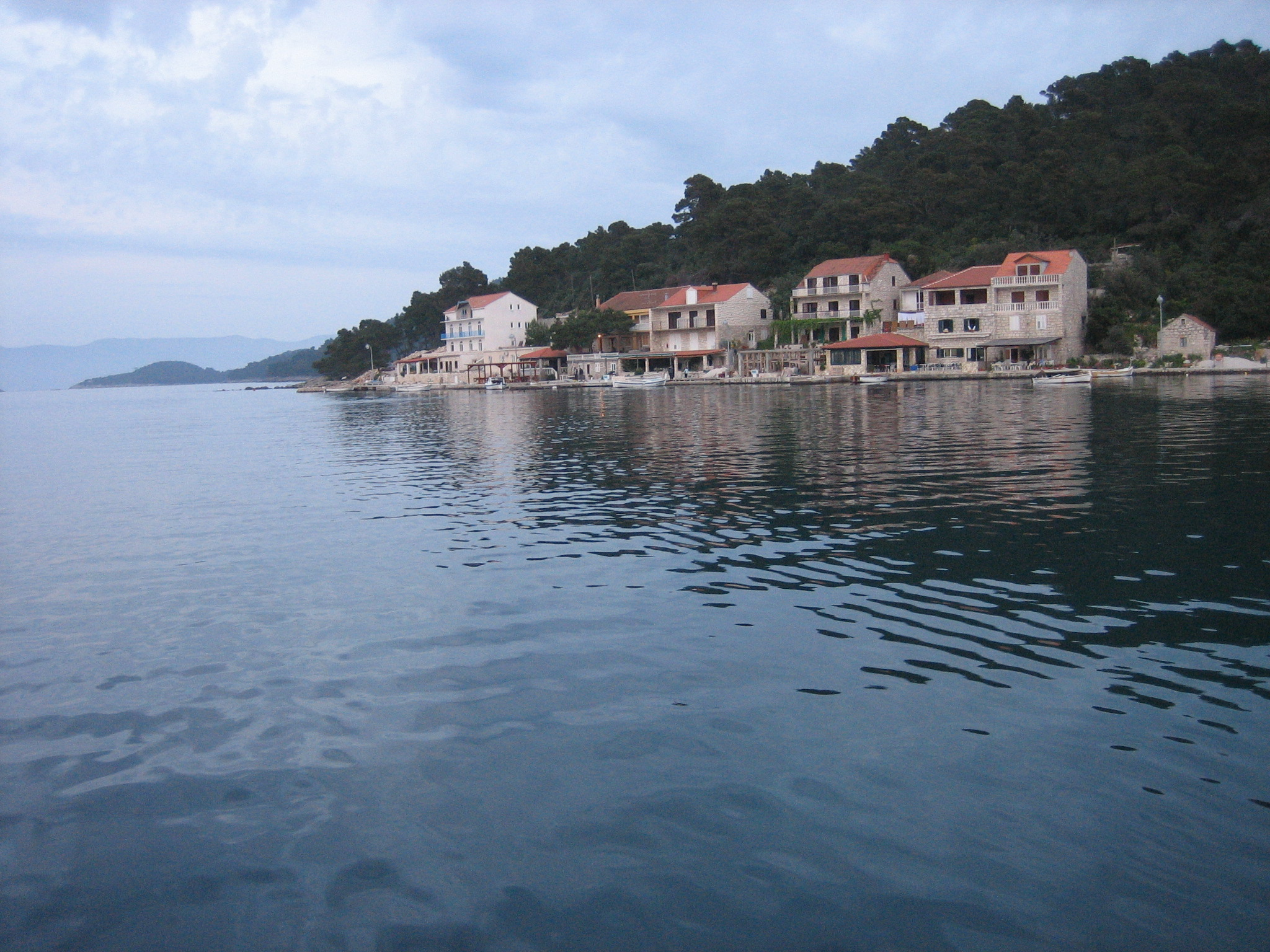

- Location within Croatia
- Country: Croatia
- County: Dubrovnik-Neretva County
- Municipality: Mljet

Area
  - Total: 1.5 sq mi (3.8 km^{2})

Population (2021)
  - Total: 62
  - Density: 42/sq mi (16/km^{2})
- Time zone: UTC+1 (CET)
  - Summer (DST): UTC+2 (CEST)

Pomena is a village on the island of Mljet in southern Croatia. It is connected by the D120 highway.

== Demographics ==
According to the 2021 census, its population was 62. It had 52 in 2011.
