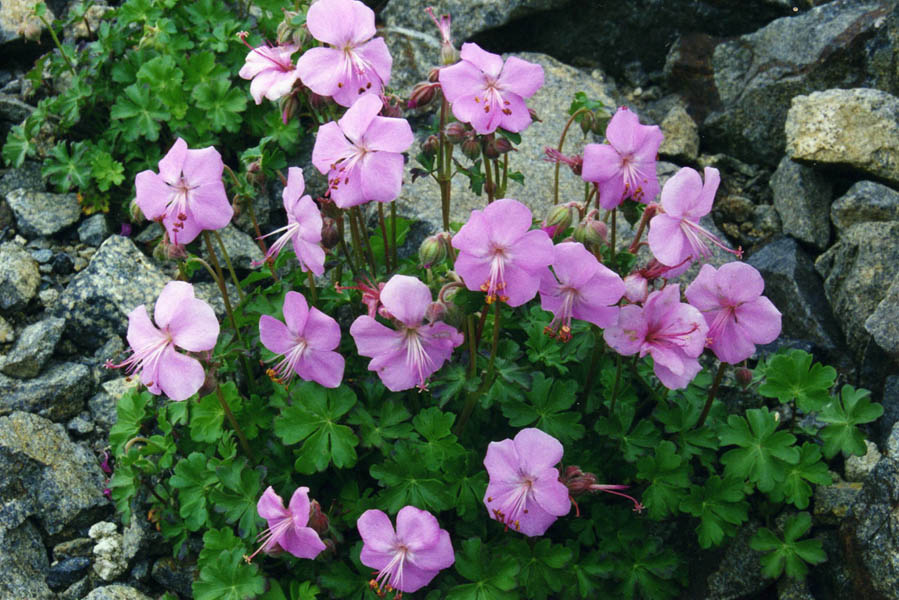

Scientific classification
- Kingdom: Plantae
- Clade: Tracheophytes
- Clade: Angiosperms
- Clade: Eudicots
- Clade: Rosids
- Order: Geraniales
- Family: Geraniaceae
- Genus: Geranium
- Species: G. dalmaticum

Binomial name
- Geranium dalmaticum (Beck) Rech.f.

Synonyms
- Geranium macrorrhizum var. dalmaticum Beck (1897); Geranium macrorrhizum var. microrhizon Freyn; Geranium microrhizon (Freyn) A.W.Hill & E.Salisb.

= Geranium dalmaticum =

Species of flowering plant

Geranium dalmaticum, commonly called Dalmatian cranesbill, is a species of hardy flowering herbaceous perennial plant in the genus Geranium of the family Geraniaceae. It is native to the Pelješac peninsula of Dalmatia on the west coast of Croatia. Growing to only 10 cm (3.9 in) tall by up to 50 cm (20 in) broad, it is cultivated as a garden subject in temperate regions for its low mound of aromatic leaves and soft mauve colored flowers. The palmately lobed glossy green leaves are tinted red in the Autumn. It has gained the Royal Horticultural Society's Award of Garden Merit.
