= Žuljana =

- Settlement
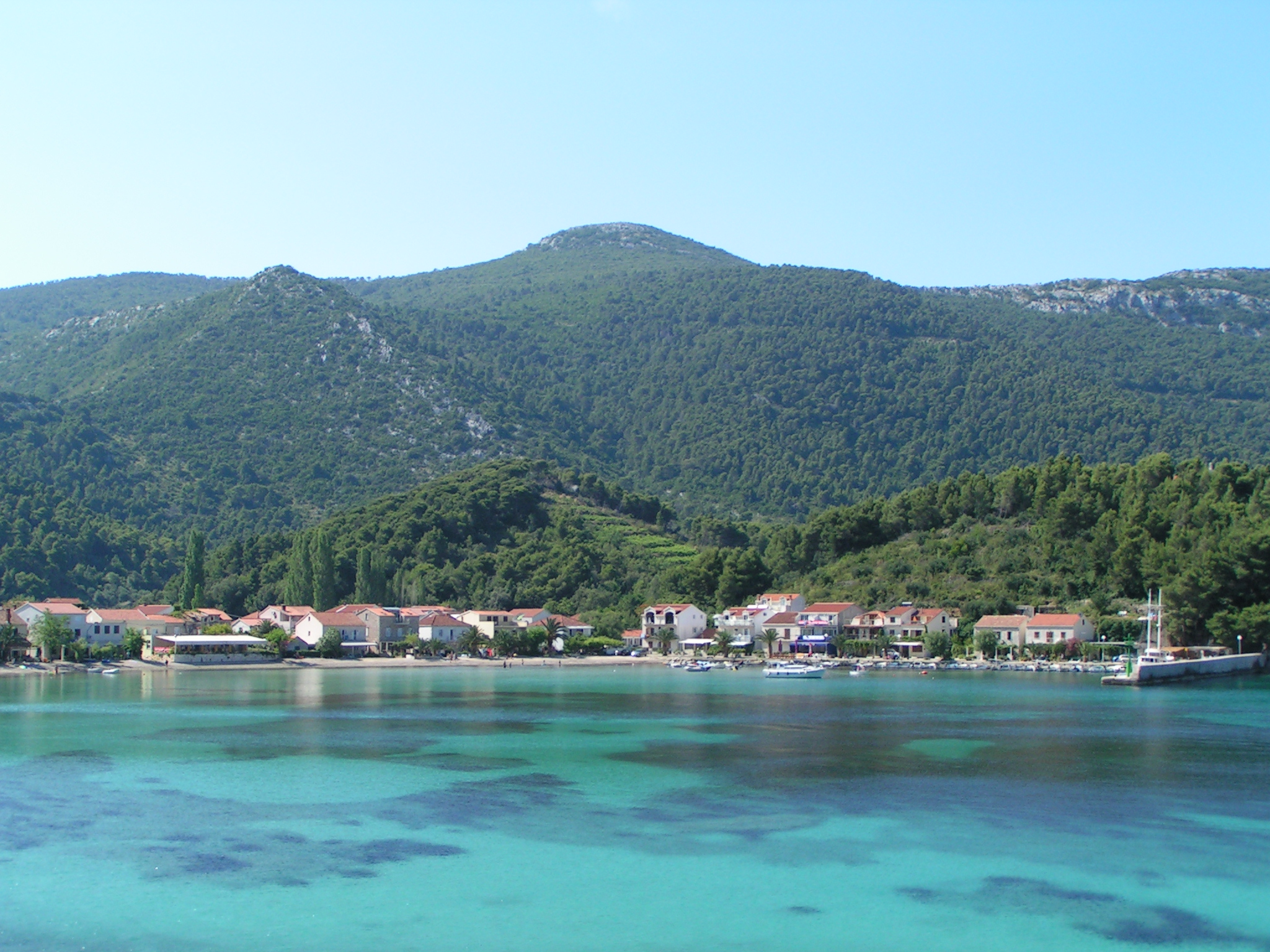
- View from the sea to Žuljana

- Location within Croatia
- Coordinates: 42.889924°N 17.453557°E
- Country: Croatia
- County: Dubrovnik-Neretva County
- Municipality: Ston

Area
  - Total: 4.9 sq mi (12.6 km^{2})

Population (2021)
  - Total: 275
  - Density: 56.5/sq mi (21.8/km^{2})
- Time zone: UTC+1 (CET)
  - Summer (DST): UTC+2 (CEST)
- Postal code: 20230 Ston

Žuljana is a village on the Pelješac peninsula in southern Dalmatia, Croatia. Žuljana (formerly Žulijana) is a village and small harbor in Dalmatia, located 25 km northwest of Stone.

== Demographics ==
Village of Žuljana: Population trends 1857–2021
v

population	282	258	231	236	271	246	246	273	236	223	192	193	181	206	218	235	275
	1857	1869	1880	1890	1900	1910	1921	1931	1948	1953	1961	1971	1981	1991	2001	2011	2021

Sources: Croatian Bureau of Statistics publications
