= Pelješac =

Peninsula in the Dubrovnik-Neretva County, Croatia

Native name: Pelišac (Chakavian)
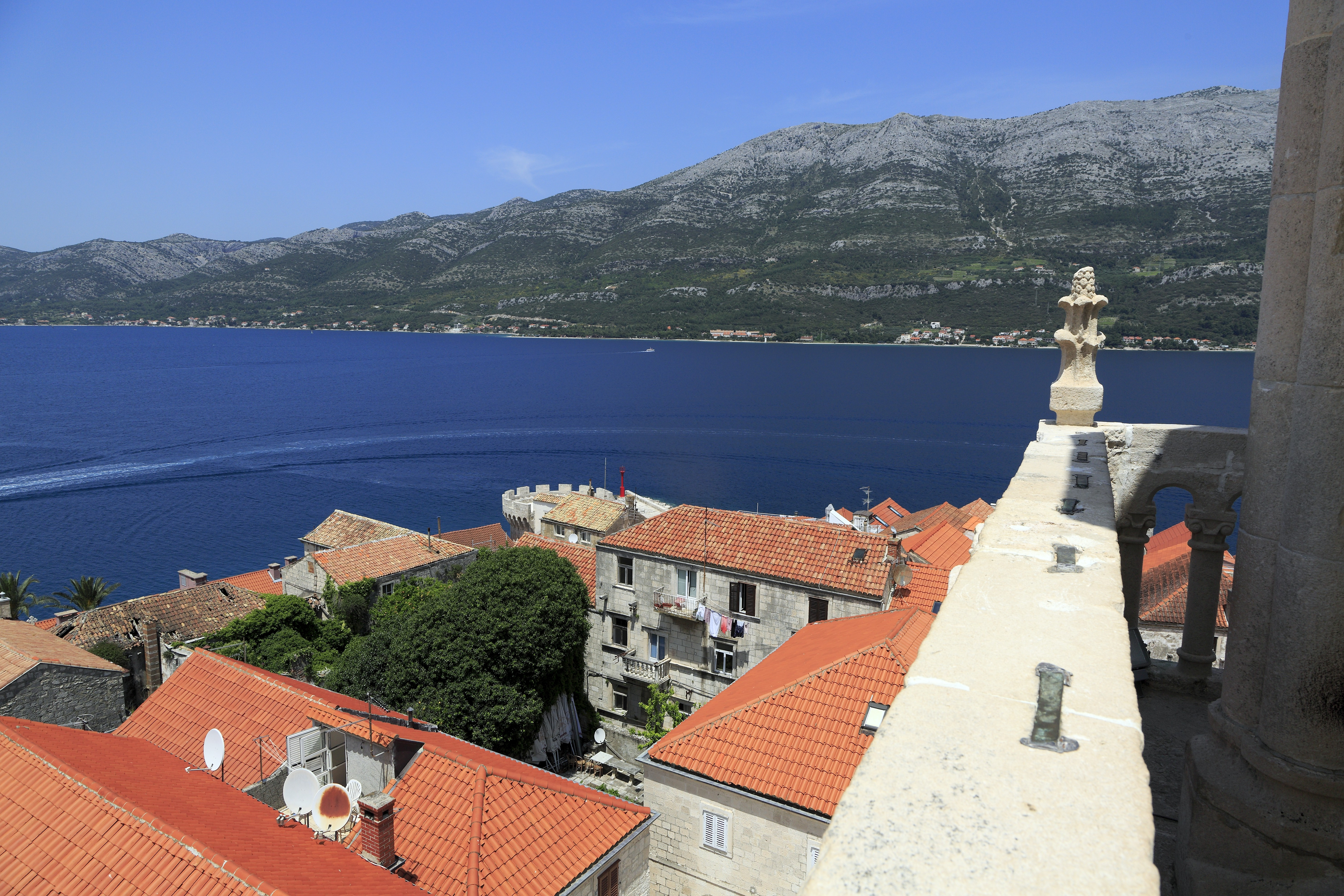
- A view of Pelješac from the Korčula Cathedral
- Interactive map of Pelješac

Geography
- Location: Adriatic Sea
- Coordinates: 42.91°N 17.46°E
- Area: 348 km^{2} (134 sq mi)
- Length: 65 km (40.4 mi)
- Highest elevation: 961 m (3153 ft)
- Highest point: Sveti Ilija

Administration
- Croatia
- Region: Dalmatia
- County: Dubrovnik-Neretva
- Largest municipality: Orebić (pop. 3,705)

Demographics
- Population: 7,401 (2021)

Pelješac (pronounced [pɛ̌ʎɛʃats]; Chakavian: Pelišac) is a peninsula in southern Dalmatia in Croatia. The peninsula is part of the Dubrovnik-Neretva County and is the second largest peninsula in Croatia. From the isthmus that begins at Ston, to the top of Cape Lovišta, it is 65 km or 40 mi long.

== Etymology ==
The name Pelješac is most likely derived from the name of a hill above the port town of Orebić, which is Pelisac. This is a relatively new name for the peninsula. Other names have been used throughout history, such as the South Slavic Stonski Rat, the Latin Puncta Stagni and the Italian Ponta di Stagno.

== Geography ==
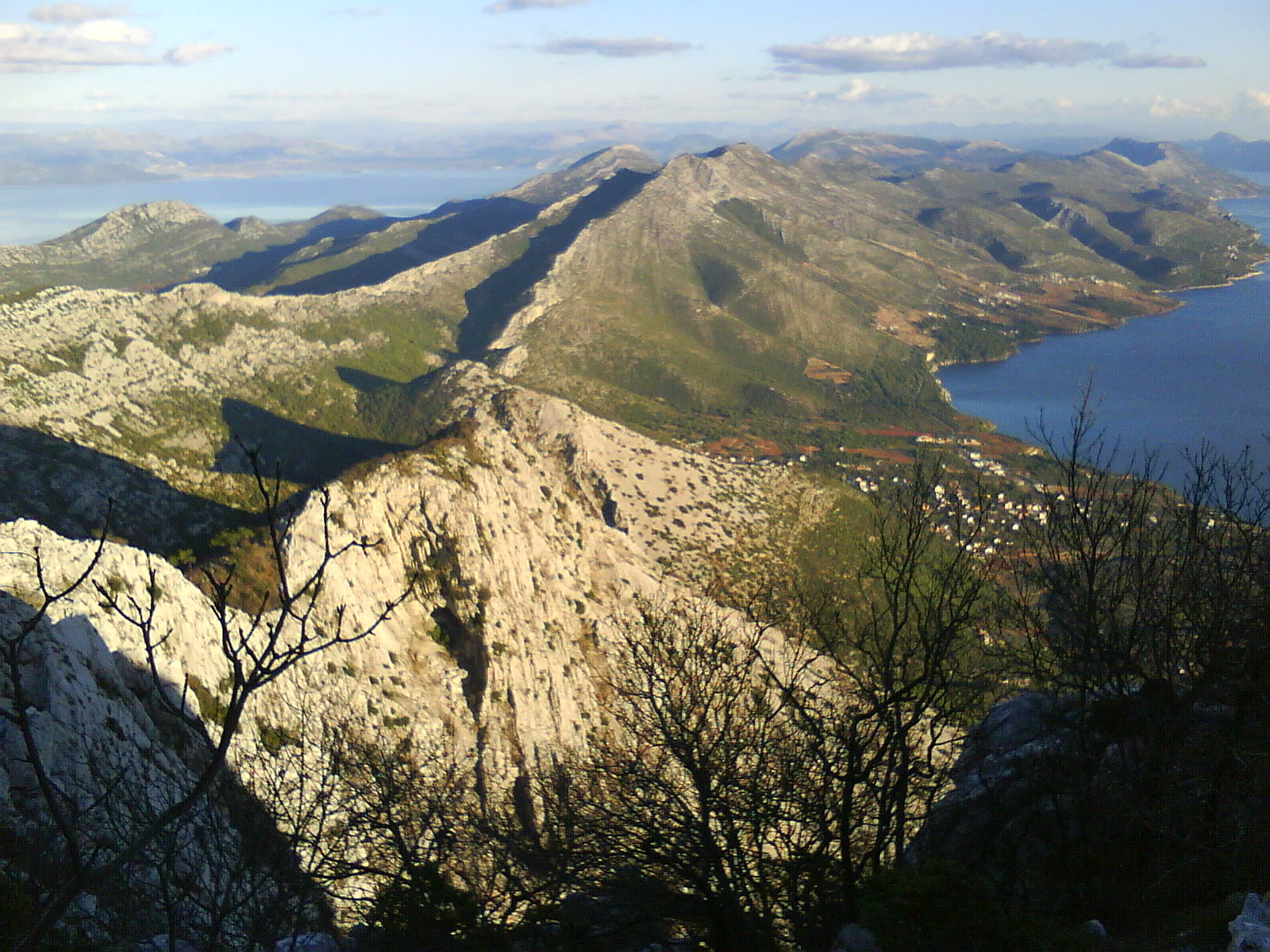
Typical karst topography of Pelješac

The Bay of Mali Ston separates the peninsula from the Klek peninsula of Bosnia and Herzegovina and from the Croatian mainland. The Strait of Pelješac is located at its far western end, and it divides the peninsula from the island of Korčula. In the western part of the peninsula is the highest summit of Pelješac, Zmijino Brdo (lit. Snake's Hill) with the peak Sveti Ilija at 961 m or 3,153 ft.

== Ecology ==
The Peninsula is part of the Tyrrhenian–Adriatic sclerophyllous and mixed forests ecoregion, in the Mediterranean forests, woodlands, and scrub biome. Forests and woodlands are dominated by Aleppo pine Pinus halepensis, kermes oak Quercus coccifera and holm oak Quercus ilex with maquis shrubs and deciduous trees Quercus pubescens, Quercus cerris, Carpinus orientalis, Fraxinus ornus, Cotinus coggygria, Paliurus spina-christi, Cercis siliquastrum. Other plant communities include shrubland and grassland. The Dalmatian black pine (Pinus nigra subsp. dalmatica), a relict and endemic subspecies of pine, is native only to the peninsula and the southern Dalmatian islands of Brač, Hvar, and Korčula, from 400 to 700 metres elevation. These black pine populations are severely fragmented, with a continuing decline of mature trees, due mostly to habitat degradation by feral goats. The Dalmatian cranesbill (Geranium dalmaticum) is endemic to the peninsula.

== Municipalities ==
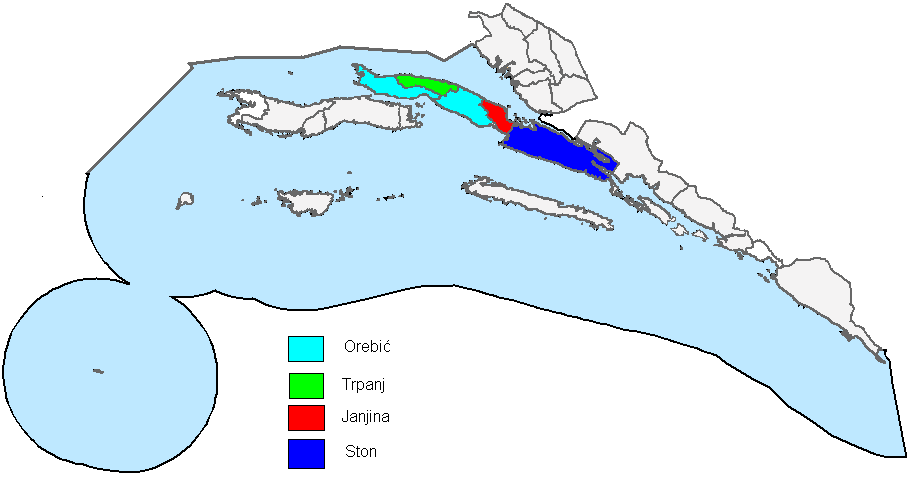
Municipal subdivision

Administratively the peninsula is divided into the municipalities of:

- Orebić in the western part, with 3,705 inhabitants (2021)
- Trpanj in the northwest, a population of 683
- Janjina in the center, with 522 people
- Ston in the east, with 2,491 residents

== History ==
=== Prehistory ===
The best known archeological site on the peninsula is Nakovana, which has preserved artifacts indicating continuous human settlement over several millennia.

The earliest known historic records of Pelješac are from ancient Greece. The area became part of the Roman province of Dalmatia after the Illyrian Wars (220 BC to 219 BC.). Roman migration soon followed.

=== Medieval history ===
In the 6th century Pelješac came under Byzantine rule. Upon the arrival of the Slavs, the area from the Neretva river to Rijeka Dubrovačka, and from the northern Herzegovina mountains to the Adriatic coast, new socio-political entities had been established, namely Neretva, Primorje, Travunija and Zahumlje, and ruled by newly risen local nobility. Ston with Rat (then the name for the Pelješac peninsula) and Mljet were under the rule of one of these principalities, namely under the knez of Zahumlje. These local rulers acknowledged the supremacy of Byzantium. After Mihajlo Višević, who acknowledged the authority of Bulgarian emperor Simeon, Zahumlje was ruled over by different dynasties. Around 950, it was briefly ruled by Duke Časlav. At the end of the 10th century, Samuilo was the Lord of Zahumlje, and the dukedom belonged to king Ivan Vladimir. In 1168, the Dukedom and Zahumlje were conquered by Grand Prince of Serbia Stefan Nemanja. Thirty years later, Zahumlje was invaded by Andrija, the Duke of Croatia and Dalmatia. In 1254, Béla IV of Hungary invaded Bosnia and Zahumlje. From 1304, Zahumlje was ruled by Mladen Šubić, then again for a short period by local župan, and from 1325 by Stjepan II Kotromanić. Republic of Ragusa (Dubrovnik), acquired it from Bosnian rulers in several purchases over several decades, first in 1333 and then on 15 January 1399. King Tvrtko II confirmed purchase of the Bosansko Primorje to Dubrovnik on 24 June 1405.

The old Ston was located on the slopes of the hills of Gorica and St. Michael, south of the Ston field. There were several early Christian churches there, the largest of which was St. Stephen's Church. The bishopric church of Mary Magdalene stood until it was bombed by the Allies in 1944. The only church that still remains is the church of St. Michael, built in the middle of the late antique castrum.

The original old town was demolished in the earthquake of 1252. With the arrival of the Republic, a new city was built on today's location. When renovations were made at the church of St. Michael at the top of the hill, fragments of Roman decorative plaster, Roman tombstones and antique ceramics were found, confirming this assumption. According to some sources, Ston experienced a destructive civil war in 1250, and in these conflicts the city suffered a great deal of destruction.

The turbulent times at the beginning of the 14th century spread across the entire country of Zahumlje. The usurpation by the Branivojević brothers, forced the people of Dubrovnik to fight them in 1326 with the help of Stjepan II Kotromanić. That year, people from Dubrovnik settled Ston, and immediately began to invest and rebuild, and established a new Ston to defend the Pelješac and protect the slaves from which they had earned big revenue. Since the conflict between the Ban in Bosnia and Serbian king, the Dubrovniks purchased Pelješac with Ston from both rulers in 1333.

Eastern Orthodoxy had appeared in Pelješac in the late 12th century under Serbian Church, when the Catholic bishop was expelled from Ston and an Orthodox episcopate was established on the peninsula. However, despite the dominance of Orthodoxy, Catholicism had been preserved in the region, and when the Pelješac peninsula came under the rule of Dubrovnik in 1333, it was still mostly inhabited by Catholics, with the presence of Orthodox and Bogomils. One of the first tasks of the new administration was therefore to spread Catholicism, create parishes and build churches and monasteries, in accordance with the principles of Cuius regio. In 1335, the Dubrovnik government expelled the Orthodox clergy and monks, bringing in Franciscans. And although some Orthodox priests remained in Pelješac afterwards, they were no longer present in the region from the 1380s onwards.

=== Modern history ===
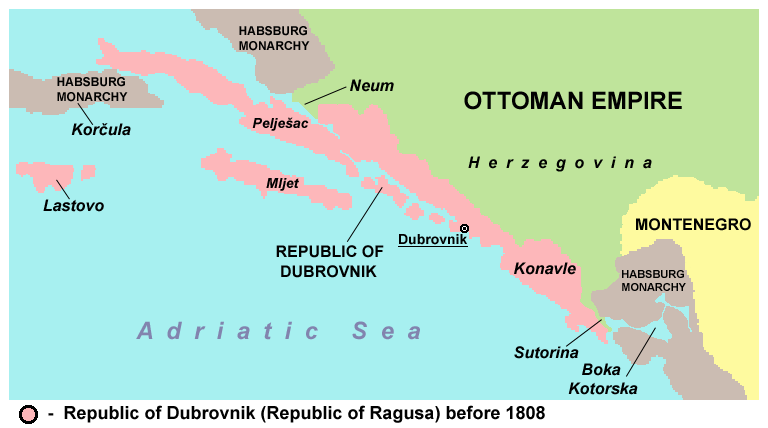
Pelješac within the Republic of Ragusa before 1808.

The Walls of Ston are large fortifications built by the Republic of Ragusa. They are the second longest walls in Europe. Ston also has one of the oldest salt planes in this part of the world.

The French Empire occupied the region in 1806, abolishing the old Republic, and in 1808 turned it into the Illyrian Provinces. In 1815 it was given to the Austrian Empire and since 1867 became part of the Cisleithania of the Dual Monarchy of Austria-Hungary. Between 1918 and 1941 it was a part Kingdom of Yugoslavia and from 1945 it was part of Socialistic Republic of Croatia within Socialistic Federal Republic of Yugoslavia. From 1991 it is part of Republic of Croatia.

== Transport ==
The bridge (marked in red) connects Pelješac with mainland Croatia

The D414 road is the longest state road on the peninsula, connecting all municipalities, together with D415 towards Trpanj and D416 towards Prapratno. County roads in turn connect Lovište, Žuljana and Hodilje, and a number of local roads to the more remote villages. The Pelješac Bridge located near Brijesta connects the peninsula to the mainland near Komarna, and through it connects the southern semi-exclave of the Dubrovnik-Neretva County with the rest of the country via its territorial waters. It bypasses the narrow strip of coastline at Neum that grants Bosnia and Herzegovina sea access. There are car ferry routes connecting Trpanj to Ploče on the mainland, Orebić to Korčula on the eponymous island, and Prapratno to Sobra on Mljet.

== See also ==
- Geography of Croatia
- Dalmatia
- Dubrovnik-Neretva county
- Republic of Ragusa
