= Prapratno =

Coordinates: 42°49′N 17°41′E

- Village
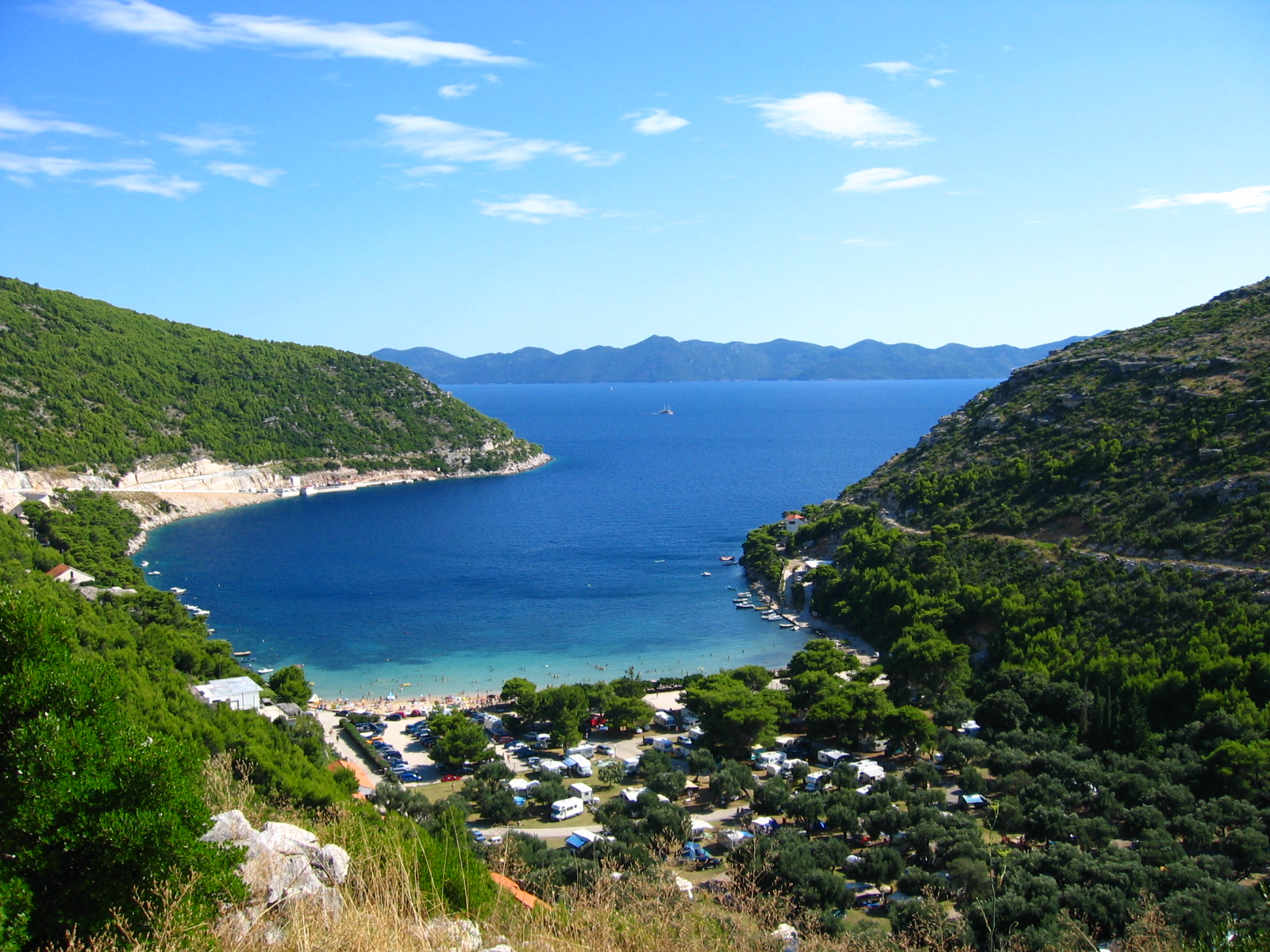
- Interactive map of Prapratno
- Country: Croatia
- Time zone: UTC+1 (CET)
  - Summer (DST): UTC+2 (CEST)

Prapratno is a port village in Croatia. It is connected by the D414 highway and by ferry.

There are 70 spots in the parking lot and the beach itself has a capacity of 2000 people. The beach itself is 250 meters by 20 meters and pets are not allowed.
