= Sobra =

- Village
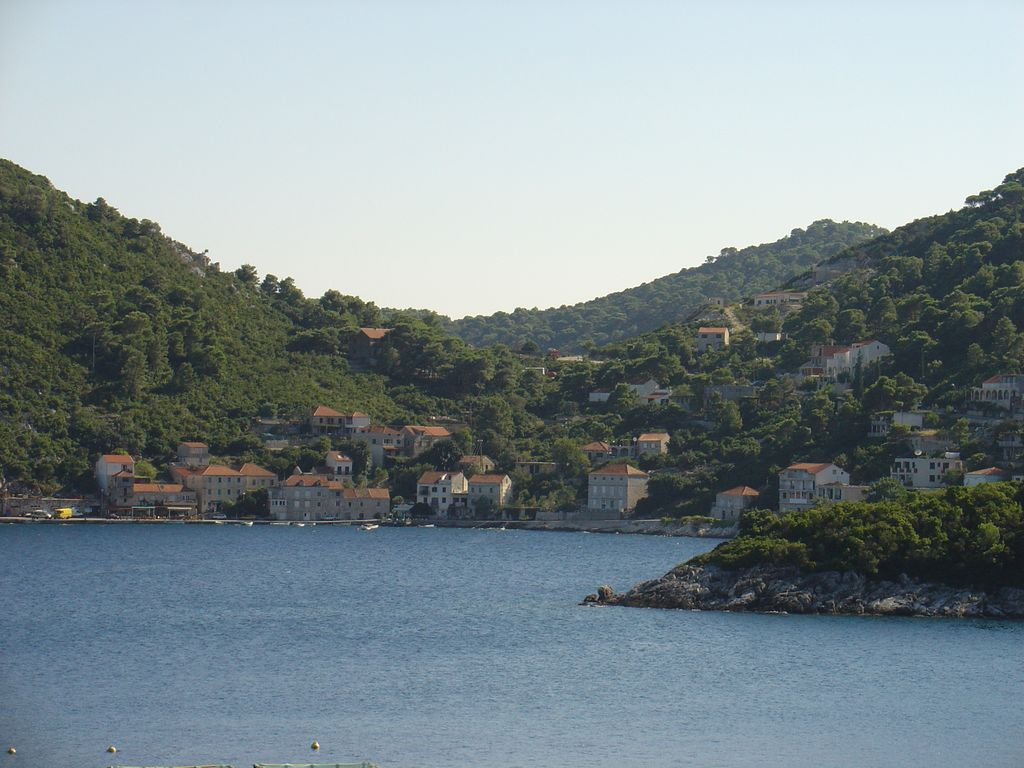

- Location within Croatia
- Country: Croatia
- County: Dubrovnik-Neretva County
- Municipality: Mljet

Area
  - Total: 1.3 sq mi (3.4 km^{2})

Population (2021)
  - Total: 129
  - Density: 98/sq mi (38/km^{2})
- Time zone: UTC+1 (CET)
  - Summer (DST): UTC+2 (CEST)

Sobra is a port village on the island of Mljet in southern Croatia. It is connected by the D120 highway and by ferry.

== Demographics ==
According to the 2021 census, its population was 129.
