= Jozo Tomasevich =

American economist and historian (1908–1994)

- Josip Tomašević
- Tomasevich, c. 1986
- Born: March 16, 1908; Košarni Do, Kingdom of Dalmatia, Austria-Hungary
- Died: October 15, 1994 (aged 86); Palo Alto, California, US
- Citizenship: United States
- Education: University of Basel
- Known for: War and Revolution in Yugoslavia 1941–1945
- Spouse: Neda Brelić (m. 1937)
- Children: 3
- Awards: Award for Distinguished Contributions to Slavic Studies (1989)
- Scientific career
- Fields: Economics; history
- Workplaces: San Francisco State University; Stanford University; Columbia University; Federal Reserve Bank; Board of Economic Warfare; United Nations Relief and Rehabilitation Administration; National Bank of Yugoslavia

Josip "Jozo" Tomasevich (Serbo-Croatian: Josip Tomašević [jǒsip tomǎːʃevitɕ]; March 16, 1908 – October 15, 1994) was an American economist and historian, specializing in the economic and social history of Yugoslavia, and professor at San Francisco State University from 1948 to 1973. Tomasevich was born in the Kingdom of Dalmatia, then part of Austria-Hungary (now Croatia), and after graduating high school and attending a commercial academy, he earned a doctorate in economics from the University of Basel in Switzerland. In the mid-1930s, he worked at the National Bank of Yugoslavia in Belgrade and published three well-received books on Yugoslavia's national debt, fiscal policy, and money and credit, respectively.

In 1938, he moved to the United States as the recipient of a two-year Rockefeller fellowship and conducted research at Harvard University before joining the academic staff of Stanford University. During World War II, Tomasevich worked for the Board of Economic Warfare and the United Nations Relief and Rehabilitation Administration, and post-war he joined the Federal Reserve Bank in San Francisco. In 1948, he joined the faculty of San Francisco State College (later San Francisco State University); he retired in 1973 and was appointed professor emeritus. He was Visiting Professor at Columbia University in 1954. Between 1943 and 1955, Tomasevich published two positively reviewed books on economic matters; one focused on marine resources and the other on the peasant economy of Yugoslavia.

Tomasevich then embarked on an extensive research and writing project on Yugoslavia in World War II – War and Revolution in Yugoslavia 1941–1945 – which was planned to consist of three volumes. Supported by grants and fellowships, he published the first volume titled The Chetniks in 1975, which explored the development and fate of the Chetnik movement during the war. The book was well received, and twenty-five years later was described by the Yugoslav and Croatian historian Ivo Goldstein as still the "most complete and best book about the Chetniks to be published either abroad or in former Yugoslavia". He died in California in 1994.

His final book was the second volume of the series – War and Revolution in Yugoslavia 1941–1945: Occupation and Collaboration – which was edited by his daughter Neda Tomasevich and published posthumously in 2001. It focused on collaboration and the quisling governments in Yugoslavia during the war with a strong emphasis on the Independent State of Croatia, an Axis puppet state. The book was highly praised by historians. The third volume on the Yugoslav Partisans remains unpublished despite being 75 per cent complete at his death. The scholarly standard Tomasevich achieved with the first two volumes in the series made his death before completing the series "a tragedy keenly felt even by those who never knew him", according to Klaus Schmider, a Royal Military Academy Sandhurst lecturer and German historian. In his obituary by Alexander Vucinich in the Slavic Review, Tomasevich was described as "a master of scholarly skills, a person of bountiful erudition, wit and human dignity".

== Early life, education, career and family ==
Josip "Jozo" Tomašević was born on March 16, 1908, in the village of Košarni Do on the Pelješac peninsula in the Kingdom of Dalmatia, then part of Austria-Hungary. The primary agricultural product of the Pelješac peninsula was red table wine, otherwise the population were primarily subsistence farmers and seafarers, and the peninsula did not have any roads for vehicular traffic until 1946. Košarni Do is a hamlet of Donja Banda and is now part of the Orebić municipality, Croatia. His father, known to the family as Nado (which translates as Hope – as in the hope of the family), travelled to California in the 1870s. Nado returned to the village in 1894, and he married the daughter of his first cousin, who was from the village of Potomje, and worked as a farmer. The couple had four sons. Jozo was sent to primary school a year early at the age of five, as he had a "predilection for learning". In December 1918, the Pelješac peninsula became part of the newly created Kingdom of Serbs, Croats and Slovenes, and in 1929 the name of the country changed to the Kingdom of Yugoslavia. Tomašević later described his family as have been in a fairly comfortable financial situation, which enabled them to send him to high school in Mostar, after which he studied for four years at a commercial academy in Sarajevo.

During several years working in Belgrade – where he was employed as a financial expert at the National Bank of Yugoslavia – and Zagreb, Tomašević saved enough money to travel to Switzerland to study at the University of Basel where he earned a doctorate in economics in 1937. During his time studying in Switzerland he supported himself through employment in a dry cleaning business and doing farm work. In 1938, he was the recipient of a two-year Rockefeller fellowship and moved to the US, thereby "availing himself of the rich resources of Harvard University". At this time, Tomašević assigned his share in the family farm at Košarni Do to one of his two brothers who remained there. The other brother living in Košarni Do received the share of the fourth brother who, by then, was a merchant mariner living in New Zealand.

Tomašević moved to California before World War II, joining the faculty of the Food Research Institute of Stanford University. During the war, he first worked with the Board of Economic Warfare and then the United Nations Relief and Rehabilitation Administration from 1944 to 1946. After the war, he gained employment with the Federal Reserve Bank in San Francisco. His wish for a position that combined teaching and research were met in 1948 when he joined the staff of San Francisco State College (later San Francisco State University, SFSU). By 1950, he was using the anglicised surname Tomasevich. With the exception of 1954, when he lectured at Columbia University, Tomasevich spent twenty-five years teaching at SFSU until he retired in 1973. After his retirement, he was appointed professor emeritus of economics at SFSU. According to his obituary in the Slavic Review written by the historian Alexander Vucinich, Tomasevich "gave his lectures rich and pertinent content, precise organization and warm delivery".

In 1937, Tomasevich married Neda Brelić, a high school teacher. They were happily married for 57 years and had three children – Anthony, Neda Ann, and Lasta. In 1976, Tomasevich contributed an essay to a book in which he presented a striking historical and sociological examination of his extended family reaching back to the early nineteenth century. He became an American citizen. Tomasevich died on October 15, 1994, aged 86, at which time he was living in Palo Alto, California. His widow Neda was also living in Palo Alto when she died on July 5, 2002, at 88.

== Scholarship ==
According to Vucinich, from when Tomasevich was 25 until his death at 86, he engaged himself in a series of research activities of which some were very extensive. He describes Tomasevich as having "a temperament that encourages inner discipline ... he gave undivided attention to each of the research projects until full completion had been achieved". Vucinich divides Tomasevich's scholarly work into three distinct phases: his work regarding the finances of Yugoslavia during the Great Depression; two studies in the 1940s and 1950s regarding international marine resources and the economic problems of the peasants of Yugoslavia; and the final phase examining the complexities of Yugoslav history during World War II.

=== Yugoslavia's economy ===
Between 1934 and 1938, Tomasevich had three books published. The first appeared in German during 1934 and was titled Die Staatsschulden Jugoslaviens (The National Debt of Yugoslavia). According to Vucinich, the book "provided a solid and much-cited analysis of government efforts to stabilize national finances at the outset of the Great Depression". The following year, he had Financijska politika Jugoslavije 1929–1934 (Financial Policy of Yugoslavia) published in Serbo-Croatian. His 1938 treatise Novac i kredit (Money and Credit), "helped train an entire generation of Yugoslav financial experts", according to Vucinich. A 1940 review of the book in Weltwirtschaftliches Archiv, by Professor Mirko Lamer – who later served with the United Nations as an expert at the Food and Agriculture Organization – described Novac i kredit as an important work that filled a significant shortfall in Yugoslav economic studies, and it also gave a vivid picture of then-current economic theory. In a 1997 article, Zvonimir Baletić, director of the Croatian Institute of Economics, described Tomasevich as one of the most prominent advocates of Keynesian economics in interwar Yugoslavia and concluded that Novac i kredit was an "authoritative" work that had a strong impact on students and among Yugoslav economists.

=== International marine resources and Yugoslav peasants ===
After he arrived in the US, Tomasevich undertook two significant projects. The first book was International Agreements on Preservation of Marine Resources, that was published by Stanford University Press in 1943. Vucinich described this work as "a highly competent inquiry into international relations in the Pacific basin centered on an issue of vital economic importance". The second book, Peasants, Politics, and Economic Change in Yugoslavia was published in 1955, and was supported by a further Rockefeller scholarship during 1950 and 1951 worth $1,750. The book was presented in three parts: an overview of the historical development and economic characteristics of the people of Yugoslavia; a summary of Yugoslav agriculture during World War I; and a review of Yugoslav agriculture during the interwar period. The book was described by Vucinich as "a study of monumental scope [which] has been widely recognized as the most comprehensive and accomplished study in the field". Vucinich observed that the book was an "impressive testimony to Tomasevich's ability both to penetrate the depths of messages carried by documentary material and to be scrupulously careful in drawing conclusions". He concluded that Tomasevich had been "eminently successful in placing the economic problems of the Yugoslav peasantry within a larger social, political and historical framework". The political scientist Zachary T. Irwin described the book as "magisterial". Irwin T. Sanders of the Department of Sociology at the University of Kentucky reviewed the book in 1956 and stated that it was "the best book available for anyone wishing to understand the socio-economic pre-Communist background of Yugoslavia". He went on to write that the book contained realistic evaluations of the peasant political parties, and concluded that "there is little question about the soundness of his economic analysis or his description of the participation of the peasant in national life".

=== World War II ===
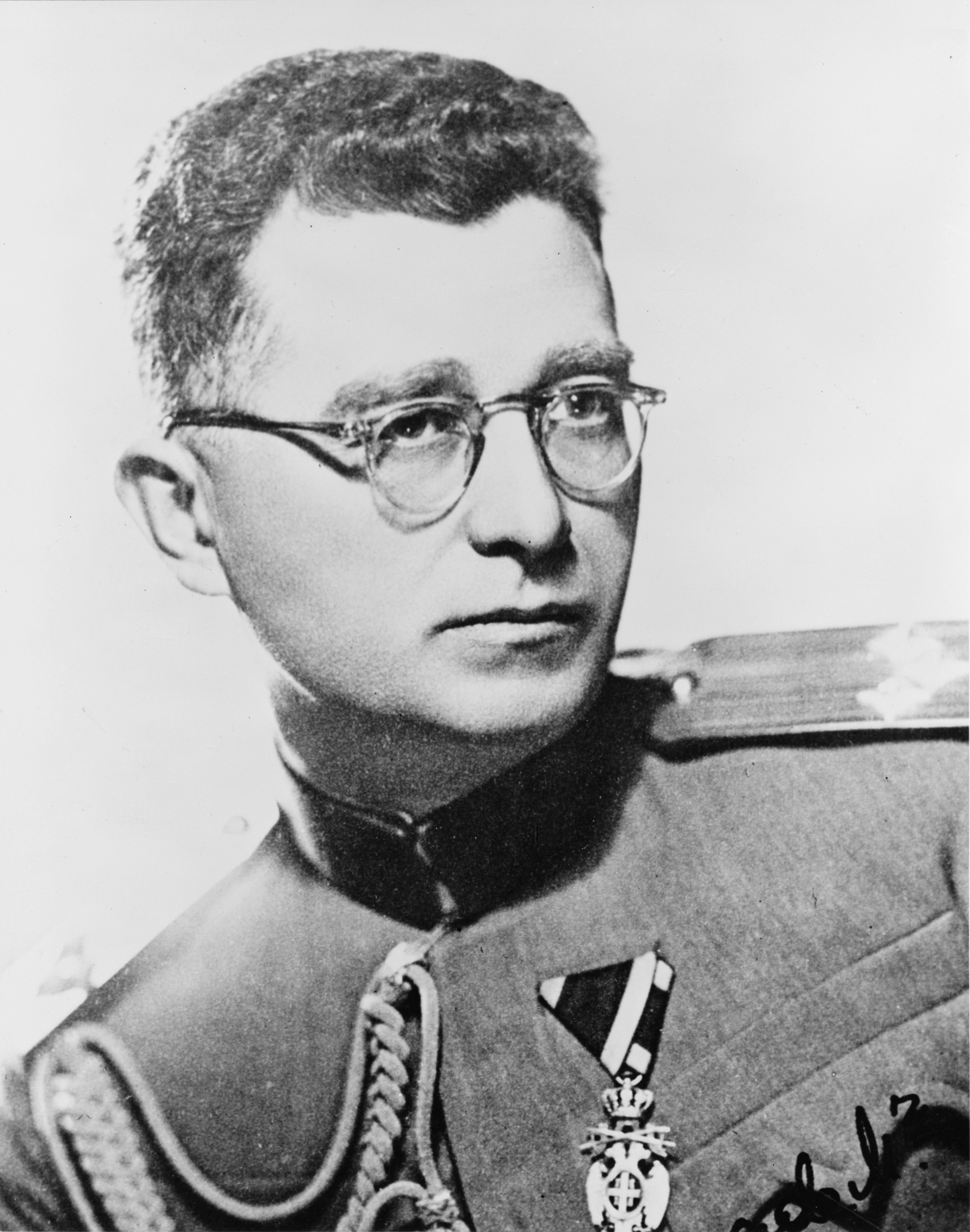
Draža Mihailović was the titular leader of the Chetnik movement in Yugoslavia during World War II.

In 1957, Tomasevich received a grant from San Francisco State University for Slavic and Eastern European studies. This led to work on a planned trilogy of the history of Yugoslavia during World War II, with an overall title of War and Revolution in Yugoslavia 1941–1945. The first volume focused on the Chetnik movement led by Draža Mihailović, which was subtitled The Chetniks and was published in 1975. According to Vucinich, it was "basically a study in politics, ideology and military operations, although the role of the economic factor has not been overlooked". Soon after it was published, the book was reviewed by Phyllis Auty, who was a professor of modern history and head of the history department at Simon Fraser University. Auty described the work as a "most impressive ... scholarly examination ... of evidence", that was meticulously referenced, and a "deceptively lucid account of a most complex and difficult subject". Auty praised Tomasevich's detachment from the subject, she stated that it was "likely to remain the standard book on this subject for a long time." In Tomasevich's obituary, Vucinich observed that The Chetniks was "clearly the most exhaustive study so far of the military forces of Yugoslavia dedicated to the restoration of the Serbian monarchy after the end of World War II", and that the book "casts significant light on the multiple facets of the conflict between the Chetniks and Partisans". The Yugoslav and Croatian historian Ivo Goldstein, writing in 2002, stated that The Chetniks "is still the most complete and best book about the Chetniks to be published either abroad or in former Yugoslavia". An alternative view of the book was advanced by the Serbian-American political scientist and professor at Vanderbilt University, Alex N. Dragnich, who condemned Tomasevich's book for persistent prejudice against the Chetnik movement and a lack of appreciation of its problems, as well as exaggerating the extent of Chetnik collaboration with the enemy. Dragnich considered that the book's concluding chapter exposed "an almost gleeful view of Serbian misfortunes". He also stated that the book was far too long and that Tomasevich presented the same material in different sections of the book. John C. Campbell of the Council on Foreign Relations reviewed the book positively and stated that The Chetniks provided "mountains of evidence that [the Chetnik] collaboration was manifold, massive and continuous".

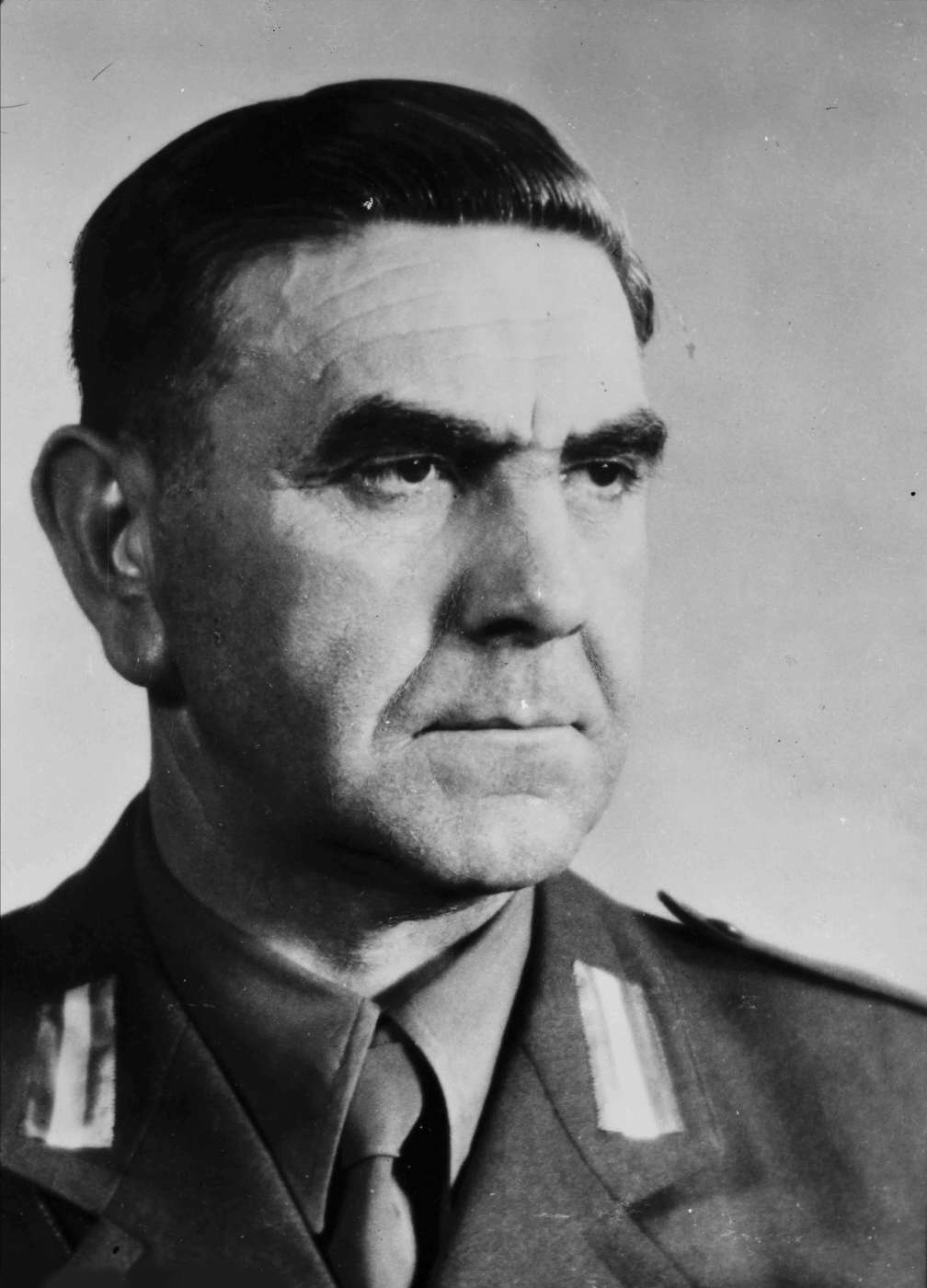
Ante Pavelić was the leader of the fascist Ustaše movement that ruled the Independent State of Croatia between 1941 and 1945.

In 1974, Tomasevich received a fellowship for his postdoctoral research into volume two of the trilogy from the American Council of Learned Societies, and this was followed in 1976 by a fellowship supporting his work on the planned third volume on the Yugoslav Partisans. In 1989, Tomasevich received the Award for Distinguished Contributions to Slavic Studies from the American Association for the Advancement of Slavic Studies.

The second volume of his planned trilogy – War and Revolution in Yugoslavia 1941–1945: Occupation and Collaboration – concentrated on collaboration and the quisling governments in Yugoslavia during the war, with a strong emphasis on the Independent State of Croatia, an Axis puppet state led by Ante Pavelić, the head of the fascist Ustaše movement. The book was published posthumously in 2001 and edited by his daughter Neda Tomasevich. Goldstein reviewed the book in 2002 and concluded that the book's most valuable contribution was the part dedicated to the Independent State of Croatia, making up almost half of the work. While he identified a few shortcomings and minor errors of fact, Goldstein described Tomasevich's work as a complete and lucid description and explanation of Yugoslavia's occupying and collaborationist forces. He concluded that "this book, together with its predecessor, is an invaluable foundation that no new research into World War II on the territory of former Yugoslavia will be able to bypass. It promises to remain [so] for a long time to come." In a review of the book published the following year, the Royal Military Academy Sandhurst lecturer and German historian Klaus Schmider described Tomasevich's grasp of the sources in five languages as "stupendous", and he observed that the result was well worth the twenty-six-year wait between the volumes. He wrote that even though he had criticisms about minor gaps in the work, compared to the "scale of the overall achievement, these are but minor quibbles". Schmider concluded that "the scholarly standard achieved by Jozo Tomasevich in his two volumes of War and Revolution in Yugoslavia and the thought of what he would have made of volume three of the series make his death a tragedy keenly felt even by those who never knew him". The third volume in the planned trilogy, which was to cover the Partisans, was 75 percent complete at the time of his death; it remains unpublished.

=== Legacy ===
According to Vucinich, Tomasevich was "a master of scholarly skills, a person of bountiful erudition, wit and human dignity, and a leading expert on the economic and social history of the former Yugoslavia". In 2004, Tomasevich's papers were acquired by the Hoover Institution Library and Archives at Stanford University.

== Selected bibliography ==
=== As sole author ===
- Die Staatsschulden Jugoslaviens [The National Debt of Yugoslavia] (in German). Zagreb, Yugoslavia: Drukerei "Merkantile". 1934. OCLC 10626641.
- Financijska politika Jugoslavije, 1929–1934 [Financial Policy of Yugoslavia, 1929–1934] (in Serbo-Croatian). Zagreb, Yugoslavia: Vlastita naklada. 1935. OCLC 18666473.
- Novac i kredit [Money and Credit] (in Serbo-Croatian). Zagreb, Yugoslavia: Vlastito izdanje. 1938. OCLC 254535363.
- International Agreements on Conservation of Marine Resources: With Special Reference to the North Pacific. Stanford: Food Research Institute (printed by Stanford University Press). 1943. OCLC 6153373.
- Peasants, Politics, and Economic Change in Yugoslavia. Stanford: Stanford University Press. 1955. OCLC 450385266.
- War and Revolution in Yugoslavia, 1941–1945: The Chetniks. Vol. 1. Stanford: Stanford University Press. 1975. ISBN 978-0-8047-0857-9.
- War and Revolution in Yugoslavia, 1941–1945: Occupation and Collaboration. Vol. 2. Stanford: Stanford University Press. 2001. ISBN 978-0-8047-3615-2.

=== As co-author or contributor ===
- Tomasevich, Jozo; Vucinich, Wayne S. (1969). Contemporary Yugoslavia: Twenty Years of Socialist Experiment. Berkeley: University of California Press. ISBN 978-0-520-01536-4.
- Tomasevich, Jozo (1976). "The Tomašević extended family on the Peninsula of Pelješac". In Byrnes, Robert F. (ed.). Communal Families in the Balkans: The Zadruga. Essays by Philip E. Mosely and Essays in His Honor. Notre Dame: University of Notre Dame Press. ISBN 978-0-268-00569-6.

=== Articles ===
- "Agriculture in Eastern Europe". Annals of the American Academy of Political and Social Science. 317: 44–52. May 1958. doi:10.1177/000271625831700107. JSTOR 1031076. S2CID 154592391.
