= Orebić =

- Municipality
- Općina Orebić
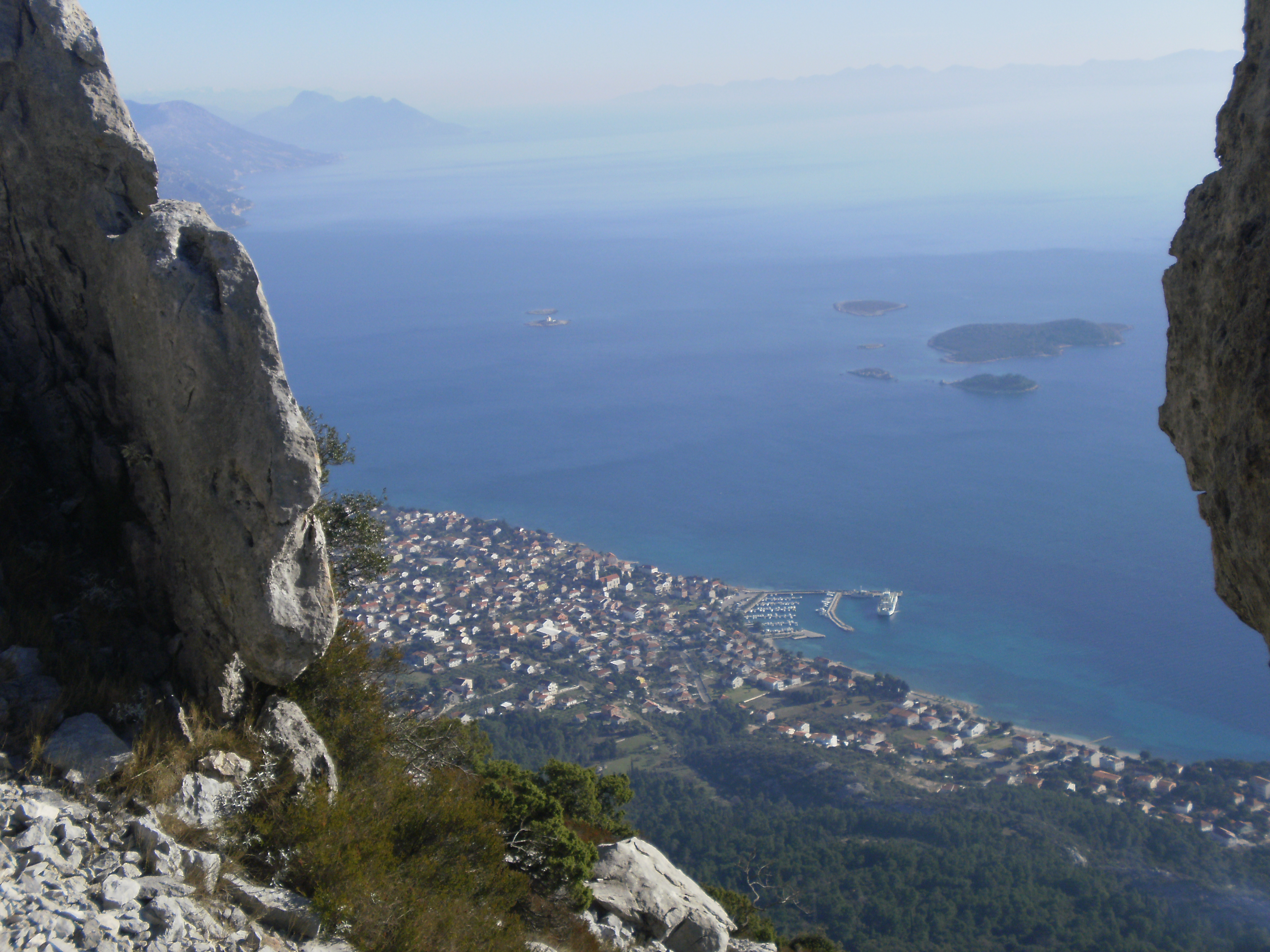

- Location within Croatia
- Coordinates: 42°58′N 17°10′E
- Country: Croatia
- County: Dubrovnik-Neretva County

Government
  - Municipal mayor: Tomislav Ančić

Area
  - Municipality: 131.3 km^{2} (50.7 sq mi)
  - Urban: 1.8 km^{2} (0.69 sq mi)

Population (2021)
  - Municipality: 3,705
  - Density: 28.22/km^{2} (73.08/sq mi)
  - Urban: 1,794
  - Urban density: 1,000/km^{2} (2,600/sq mi)
- Time zone: UTC+1 (CET)
  - Summer (DST): UTC+2 (CEST)
- Postal code: 20250
- Area code: 020
- Website: orebic.hr

Orebić [ɔ̌rɛbitɕ] is a port town and municipality in the Dubrovnik-Neretva county in Croatia. It is located on the Pelješac peninsula on the Dalmatian coast. Orebić is directly across a strait from the town of Korčula, located on the island of the same name. Ferries service the two towns frequently. Orebić is 112 km (70 mi) from Dubrovnik.

It was named after the family who restored the castle inside the fortified settlement in 1586. In 1707, Emperor Joseph granted hereditary nobility to the Orebić family for their 70+ years of service in naval warfare and trade. The original Writ of Nobility is housed in the town's Maritime museum, with Croatian and Latin translations at the Franciscan Monastery. The document describes the sea captains' colorful exploits in defending the Austro-Hungarian empire, Italy, and Spain against France and the Ottoman Empire. The family's role in the Dalmatian salt trade brought wealth and distinction to Dalmatia. During the 19th century, Orebić had 17 of the most important nautical captains in Austria-Hungary Empire.

== Tourism ==
Tourism is one of the town's main sources of income, especially during the summer months. In the 1960s a large number of non-locals (mostly from larger cities in the then former Yugoslavia) built homes for their summer holidays. In subsequent years, tourists from other European countries have begun visiting, staying either in hotels or in the camp sites located around the town that also cater to camper vans. The town's main beach is at Trstenica. Many locals also rent out rooms or apartments during the high season.

The Franciscan monastery of Our Lady of Angels is a local attraction, along with the Mount of Saint Elijah (Croatian brdo Sv. Ilija) located behind the town which offers a view of the island of Korčula and the Adriatic Sea. There are many sign-posted hiking paths from Orebić and nearby villages that lead to the summit .

Historic sea captains' homes line the waterfront, illustrating the town's heritage. Due to the wealth and importance of the sea captains in Dalmatia, the houses were built on a grand scale and set behind large gardens. Most of the homes in the historic district are still owned by descendants of the sea captains families, even those who returned after many years in diaspora. During the 20th century, these families donated ethnographic artifacts, for display at the Maritime museum and museum at the Franciscan monastery house.

== Climate ==
Between 1981 and 2011, the highest temperature recorded at the local weather station was 37.5 °C (99.5 °F), on 25 July 1988. The coldest temperature was −3.7 °C (25.3 °F), on 9 March 1987.

== Transport ==
Orebić is accessible by road and ferry. It is some 90 minutes drive from Dubrovnik and some 3–4 hours drive from Split, both of which are accessed via the Adriatic Highway (European route E65) which is accessed via nearby Ston. The drive from Ston to Orebić passes some of Croatia's largest vineyards including those at Potomje and Postup.

There are ferry connections to Korčula each day from Orebić. The car ferry deposits passengers some 3–4 kilometers from Korčula Town and, therefore, is not suitable for foot passengers. There is also a passenger ferry that deposits passengers directly in Korčula Town. Car ferry tickets must be purchased in advance of boarding the ferry at the Jadrolinija booth near to Splitska Banka. Tickets for the passenger ferry can be purchased when boarding the craft.

From Korčula, there are other ferry services including the main Rijeka-Split-Stari Grad (Hvar)-Korčula-Mljet-Dubrovnik-Bari ferry service operated by Jadrolinija. In addition, there are fast ferry services from Korčula to Dubrovnik and to Hvar Old Town-Split. There are also services to nearby islands such as Badija.

Bus services operate from Orebić to Dubrovnik, Split and Zagreb.

== Demographics ==
According to the 2011 census there were 4,122 residents in the municipality of Orebić, with 94% being Croats. There are a large number of home-owners in the town who do not reside there permanently.

In 2021, the municipality had 3,705 residents in the following 14 settlements:

- Donja Banda, population 154
- Kućište, population 173
- Kuna Pelješka, population 211
- Lovište, population 187
- Nakovanj, population 1
- Orebić, population 1794
- Oskorušno, population 77
- Pijavičino, population 94
- Podgorje, population 150
- Podobuče, population 37
- Potomje, population 209
- Stanković, population 267
- Trstenik, population 115
- Viganj, population 236
Orebić: Population trends 1857–2021
v

population	4802	4353	4503	4391	4482	4307	4172	4052	3123	3442	3599	3547	3687	3855	4165	4122	3705
	1857	1869	1880	1890	1900	1910	1921	1931	1948	1953	1961	1971	1981	1991	2001	2011	2021

Sources: Croatian Bureau of Statistics publications

The municipality is divided in the following districts:

District	Population	Number of households:
MO Orebić	2410	773
MO Lovište	244	78
MO Kućište	204	75
MO Viganj	322	120
MO Borje i Podobuće	35	11
MO Donja Banda	170	72
MO Potomje	256	84
MO Kuna	258	88
MO Oskorušno	126	43
MO Pijavičino	143	60
MO Trstenik	97	40

=== Sports ===
NK Orebić

== Notable people ==
- Celestin Medović- painter, from the village of Kuna Pelješka
- Piyale Pasha- Ottoman grand admiral and vizier
- Zvonimir Roso- criminologist and psychologist, from the village of Kuna Pelješka
- Ivan Tomašević
- Jozo Tomasevich-economist and historian, from the village of Košarni Do
- John Mark Totich-new Zealand gum-digger, boarding-house keeper, community leader and consul, from the village of Kuna Pelješka

== Gallery ==
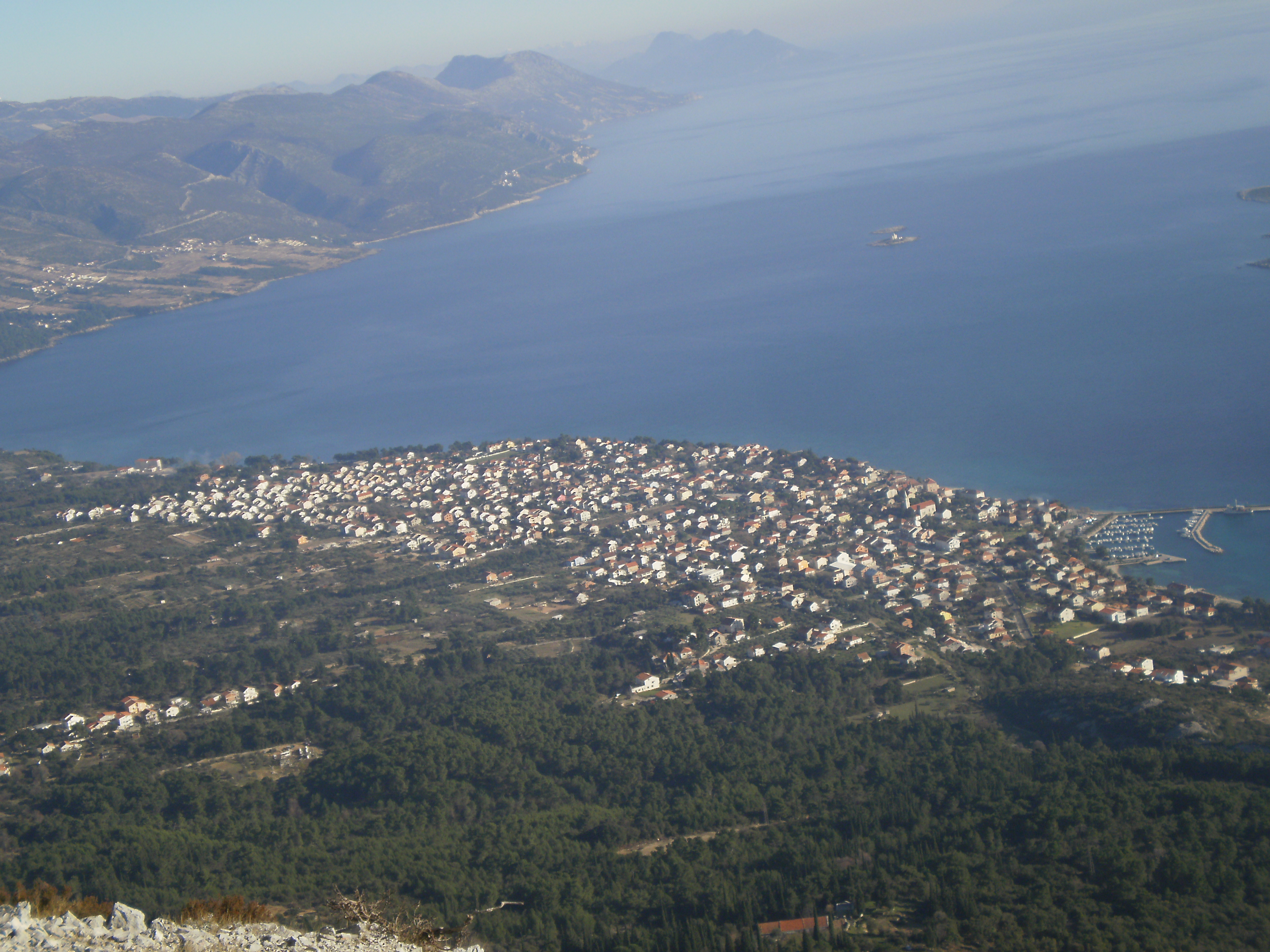

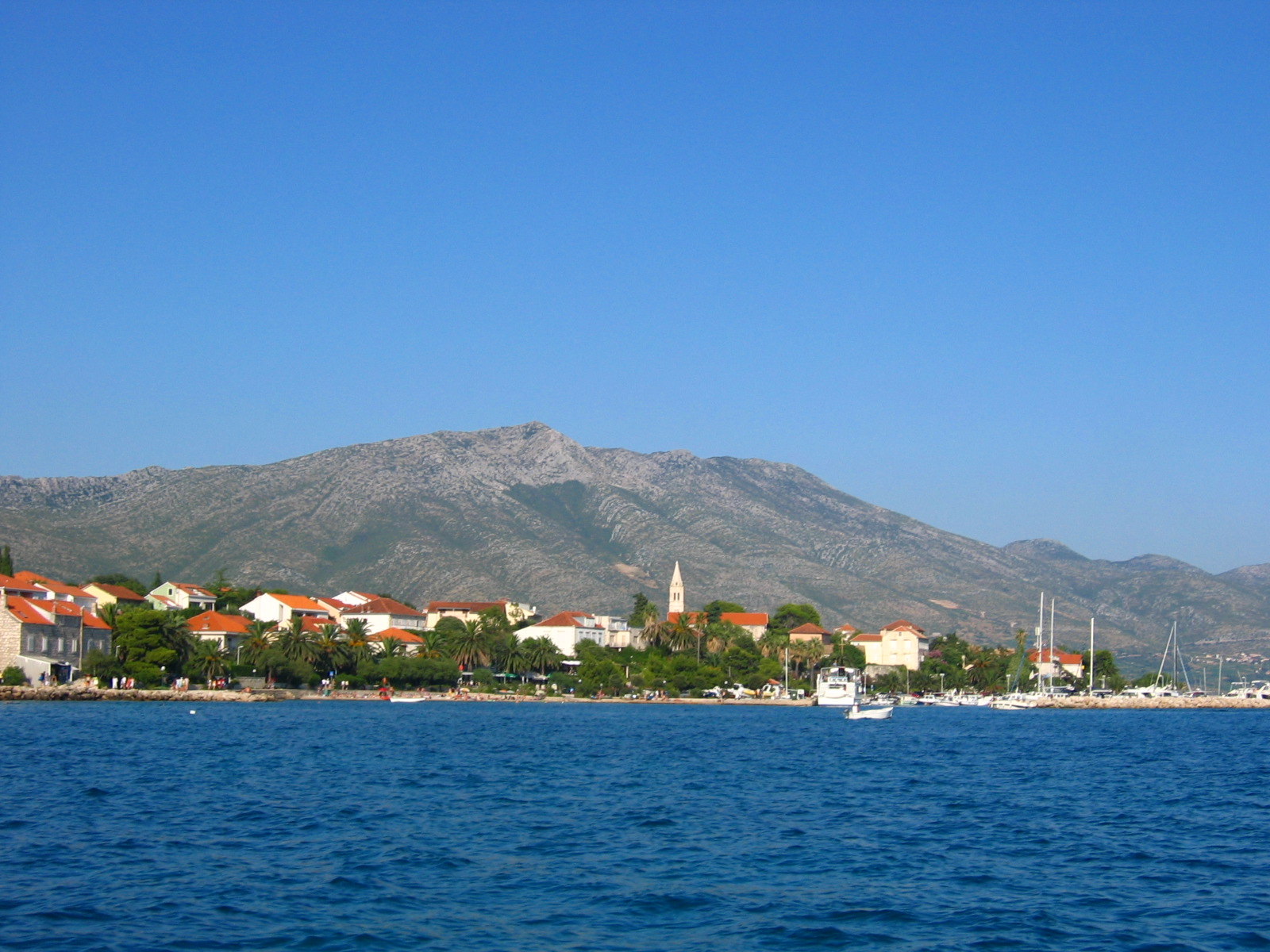

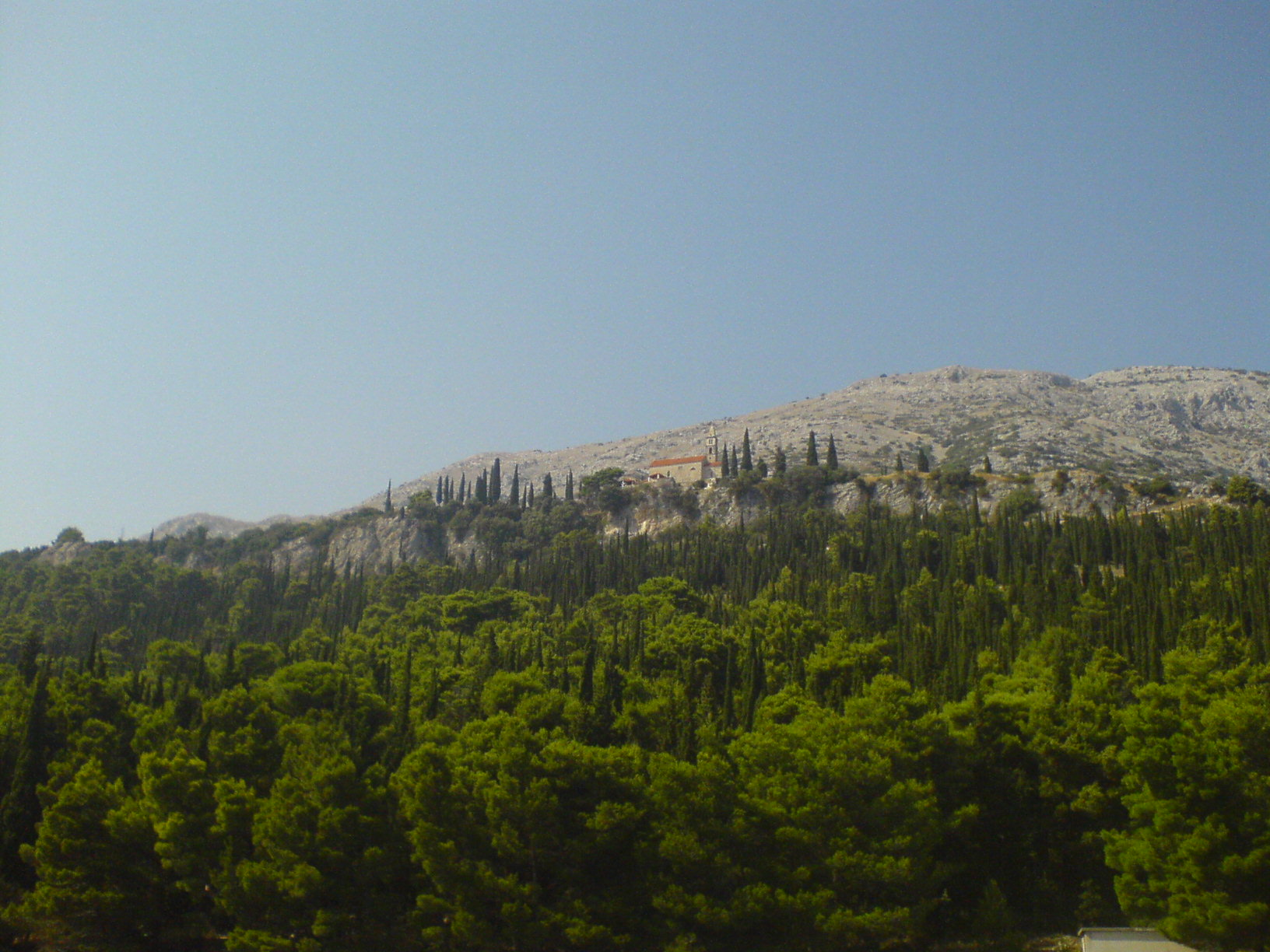

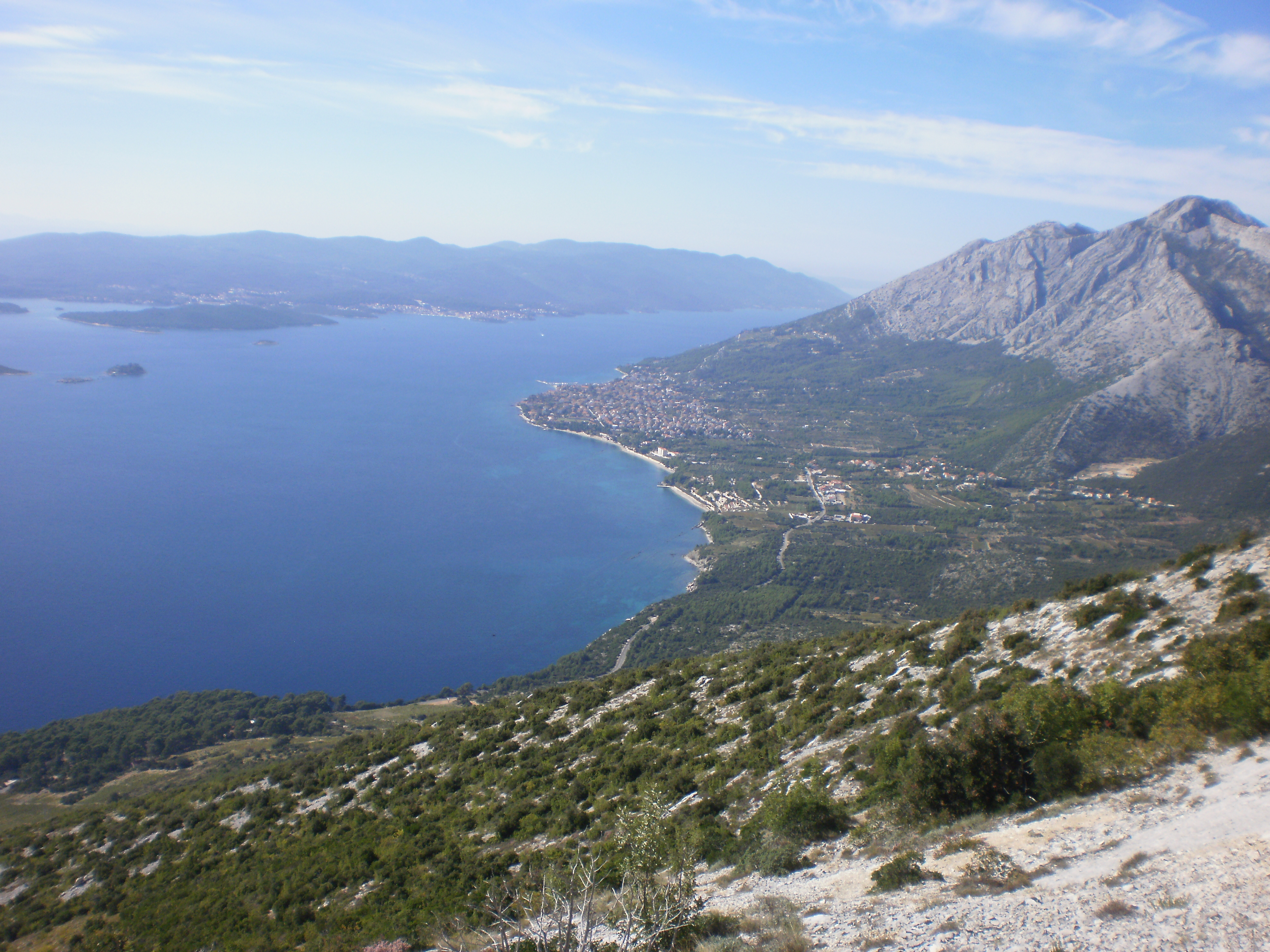

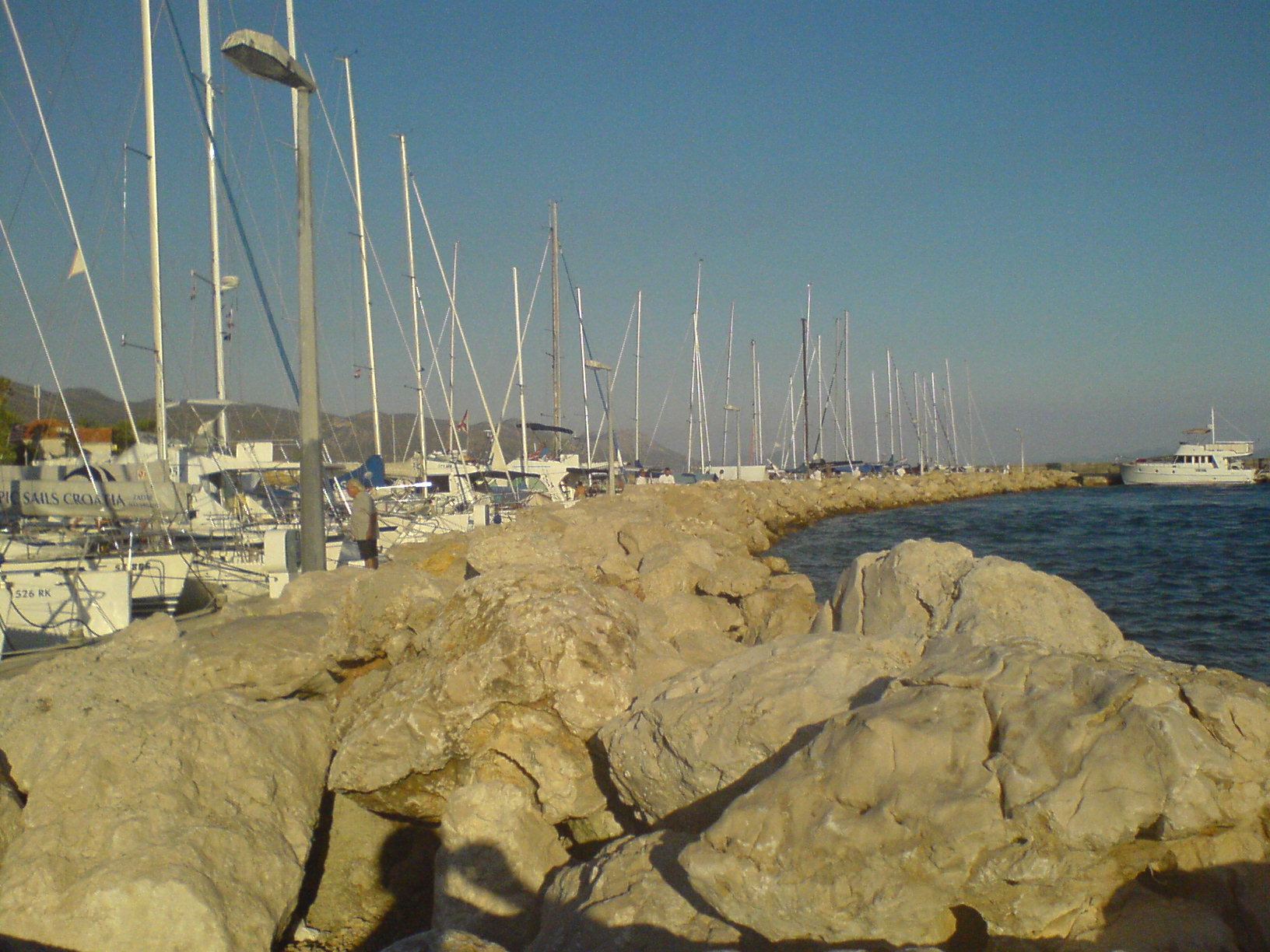

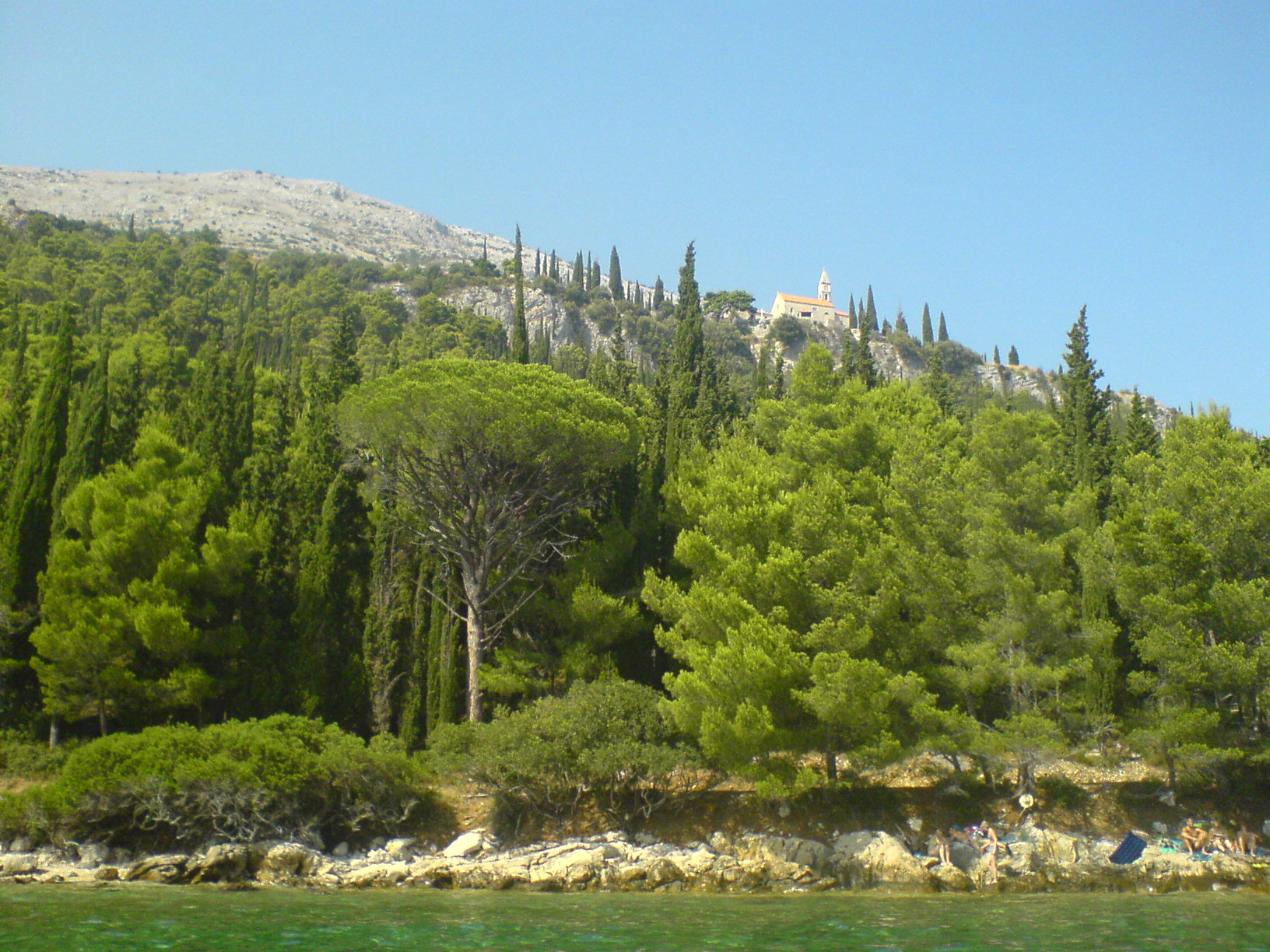

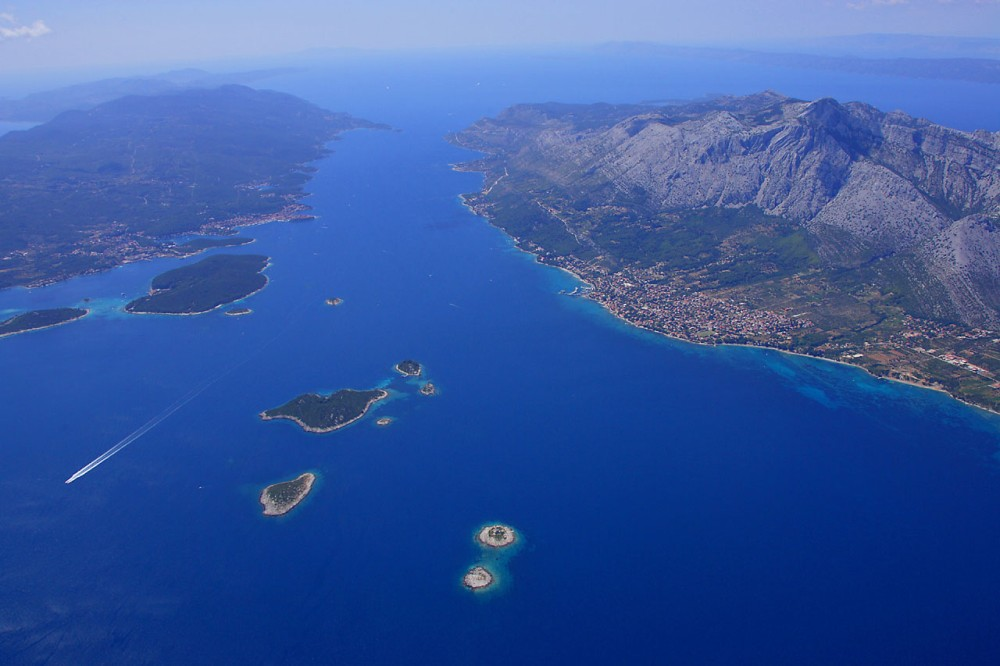

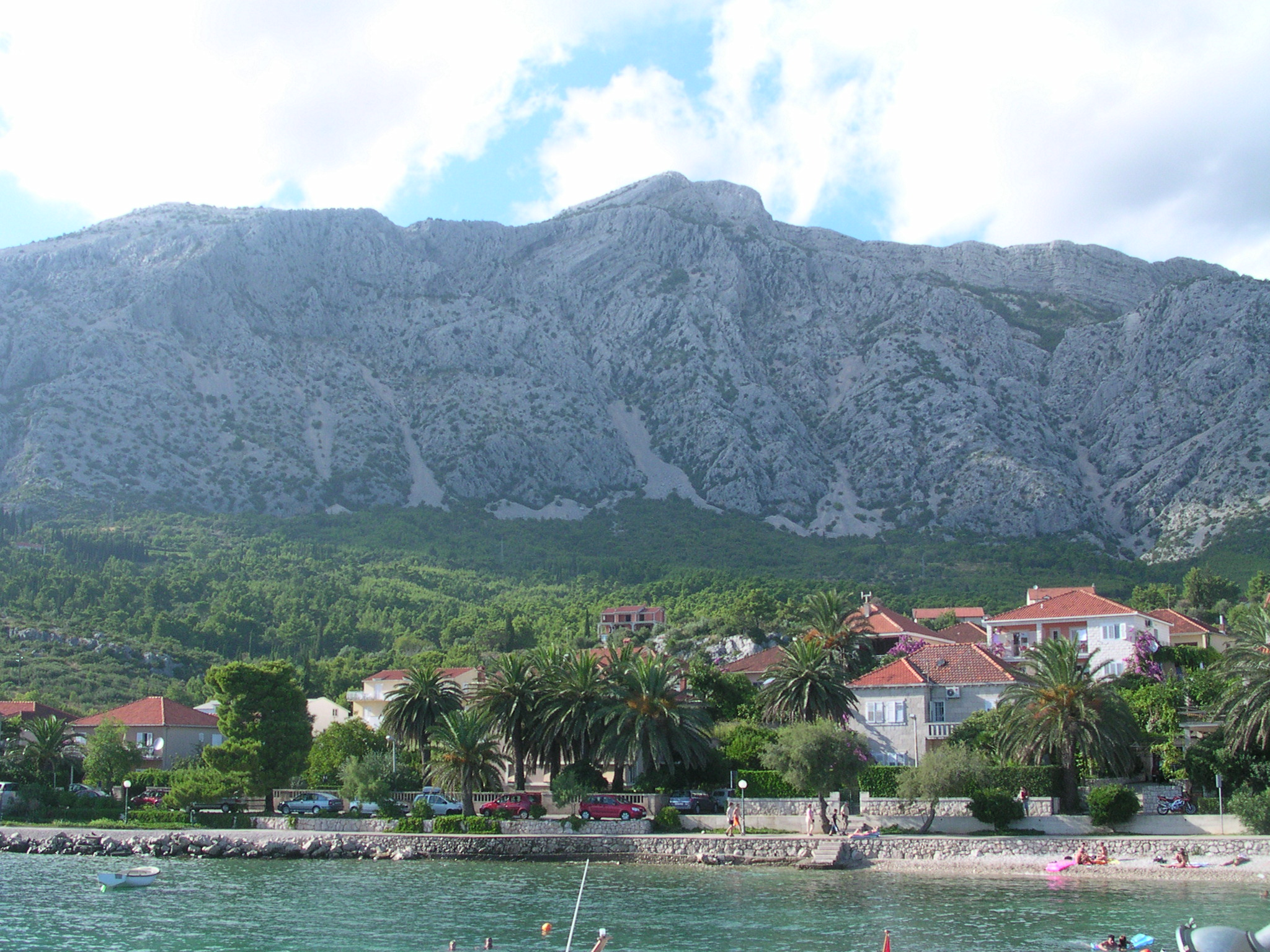

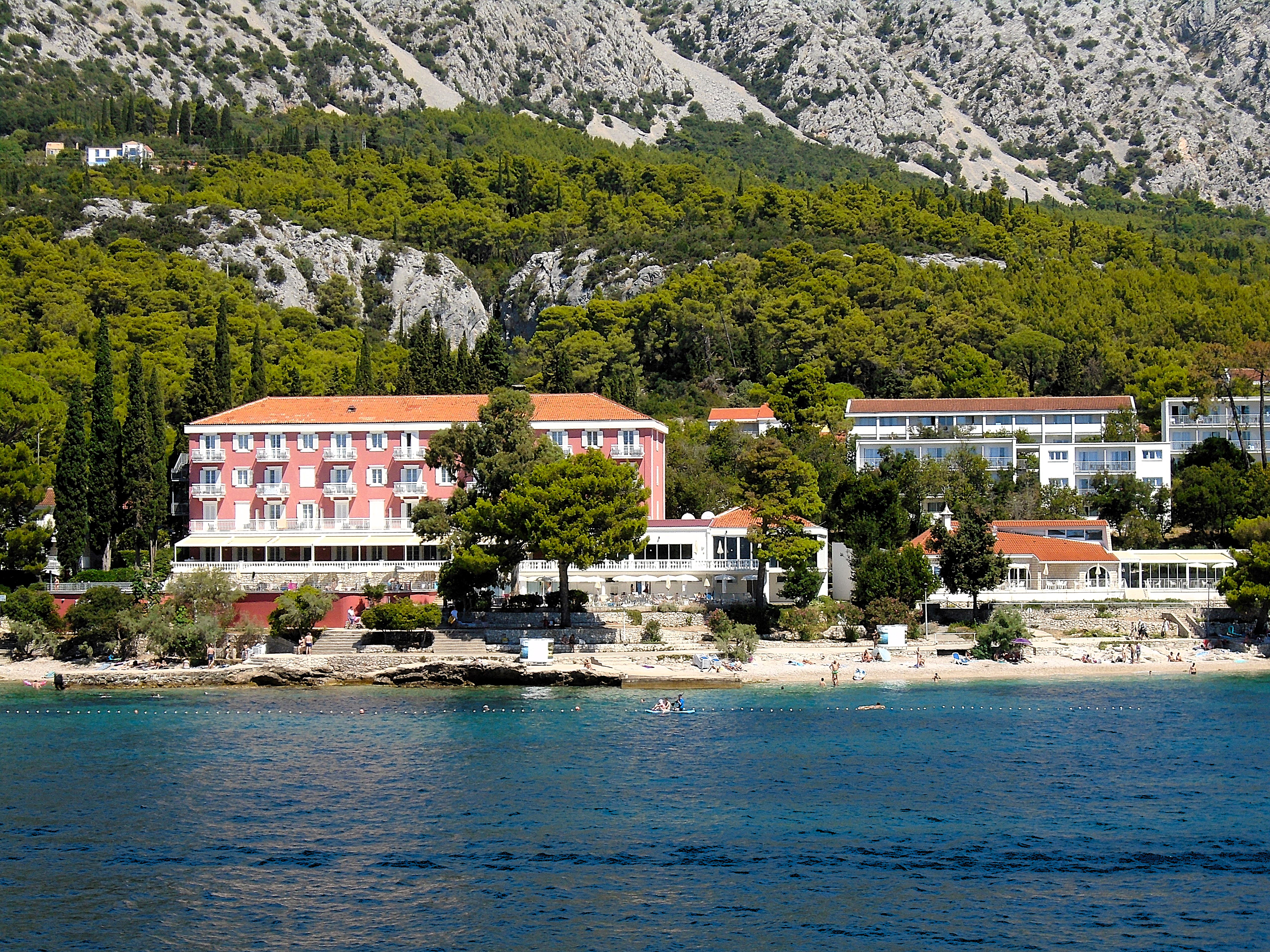
