= Roso =

Roso may refer to:

- Ángelo Roso Neto (born 1960), Brazilian rower
- Đovani Roso (born 1972), Croatian football player
- Mario Roso de Luna (1872–1931), Spanish lawyer, theosophist, journalist, writer, freemason and astrologist
- Rosō Fukuhara (1892–1946), Japanese photographer
- Zvonimir Roso (1938–1997), Croatian criminolo gist and psychologist

== See also ==
- Rosso (surname)
