= Ivan Tomašević =

Ivan Tomašević may refer to:

- Ivan Tomašević (soldier), Croatian soldier and an NDH general
- Ivan Tomašević (activist), Croatian labourer and political activist in New Zealand
