= Lovro Florio =

Lovro Florio or Lovro Cvitanovic (d. 1642) was a Croatian Franciscan Father from the village of Orebić, Pelješac Peninsula in Dubrovnik in the 1620s. He was a member of Board Definitor of Bulgaria, with the Franciscan church in Helezna, near Kiprovac. Florio worked as a male nurse and pharmacist and was mentioned as a missionary about 1626 in Albania, Kosovo, Janjëve and Novo Brdo. Father Lovro provided medical treatment to both the Bishop and the Wallachian Radu IV the Great. Together with Albanian Fathers Pjetër Koqi, Nikollë Kabashi and Marin of Dubrovnik, Florio is mentioned in 1637, 1638 and 1641 as definitor and guardian. He hoped to become a bishop. He died in 1642.
