= Podgorje, Dubrovnik-Neretva County =

Podgorje
- Village
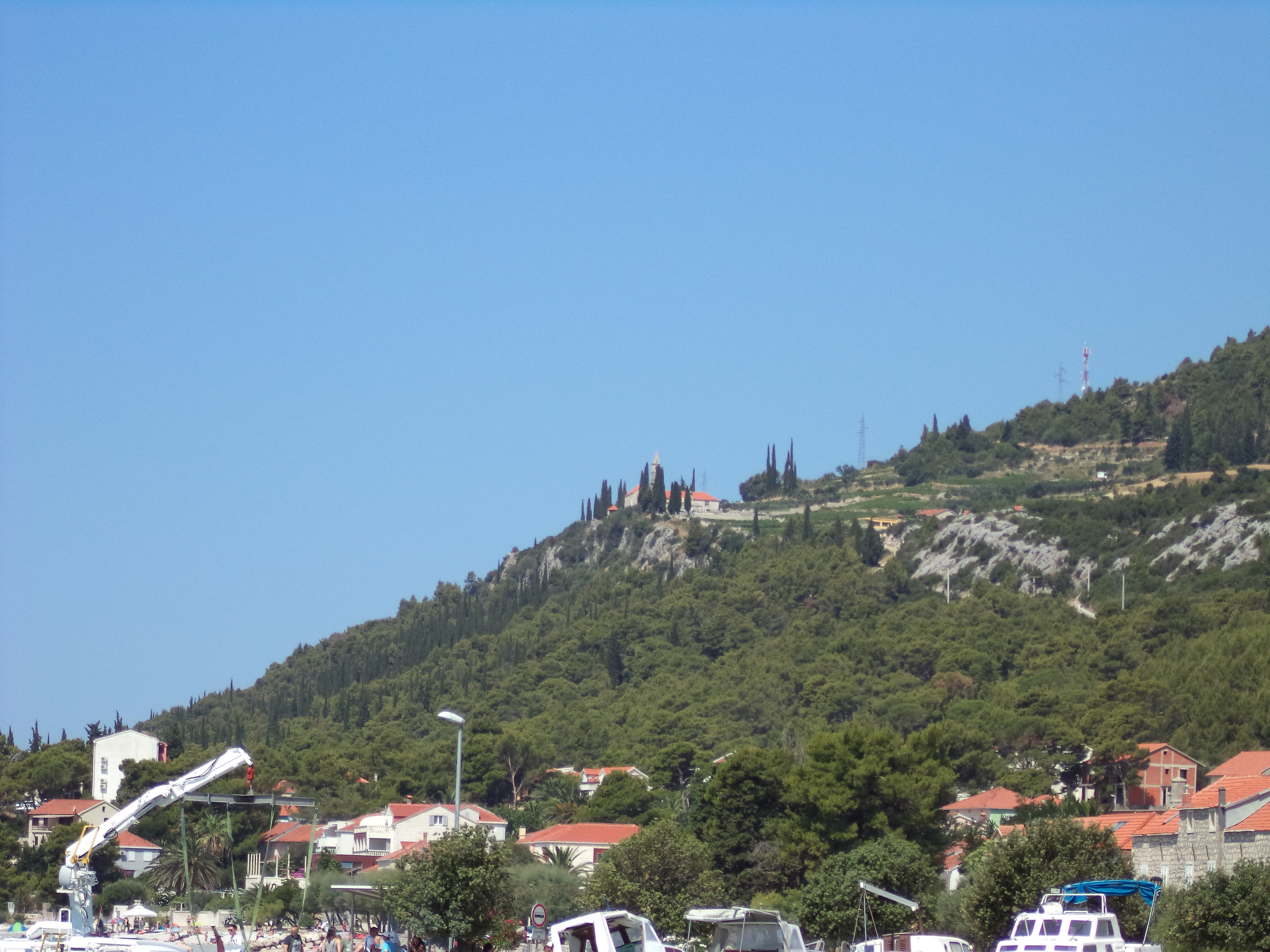

- Location within Croatia
- Coordinates: 42.9866092°N 17.1381535°E
- Country: Croatia
- County: Dubrovnik-Neretva County
- Municipality: Orebić

Area
  - Total: 3.1 sq mi (8.1 km^{2})

Population (2021)
  - Total: 150
  - Density: 48/sq mi (19/km^{2})
- Time zone: UTC+1 (CET)
  - Summer (DST): UTC+2 (CEST)

Podgorje is a village in Croatia, located on the Pelješac peninsula on the Dalmatian coast.

== Demographics ==
According to the 2021 census, its population was 150.
