= Dingač (wine) =

Style of Croatian wine

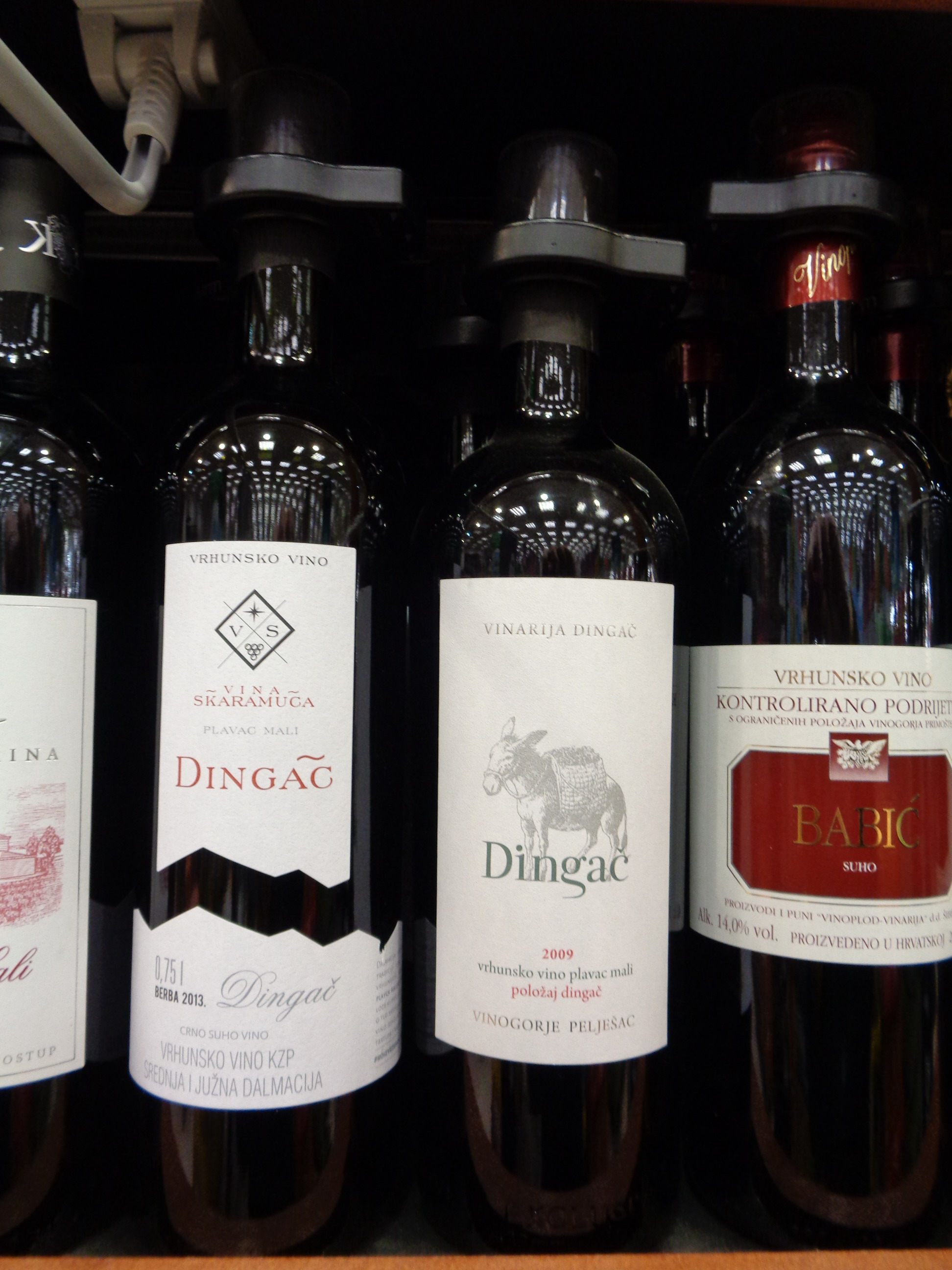
A selection of Dingač wines

Dingač is a Croatian premium quality red wine produced from the plavac mali crni grape variety in a limited homonymous area of the Pelješac sub-region of the Middle and South Dalmatia wine growing region.

At about 60ha of the locality Dingač it is possible to produce 2.000 to 3.000 hl a year of the premium wine dingač.

The wine has a dark red to purple color with blue reflections, it is harmonious and full, slightly bitter and astringent, but pleasant. The fragrance and particularly the bouquet are marked and unique to that wine. Owing to the presence of dry berries in the grapes of plavac mali crni, in some years the ethanol content is so high that it reaches the highest possible values the wine-making yeasts can produce naturally. Sometimes the fermentation may stop, leaving in the wine some residual sugar, so two wine types are possible - dry and semi-dry.

Dingač is classified as the highest standard recognized by the Croatian law - "Vrhunsko Vino" ("Premium Quality Wine"). It was the first wine protected as "Premium Quality" (1965). The one of Dingač's production pioneers is family Violić.
