= Oskorušno =

- Village
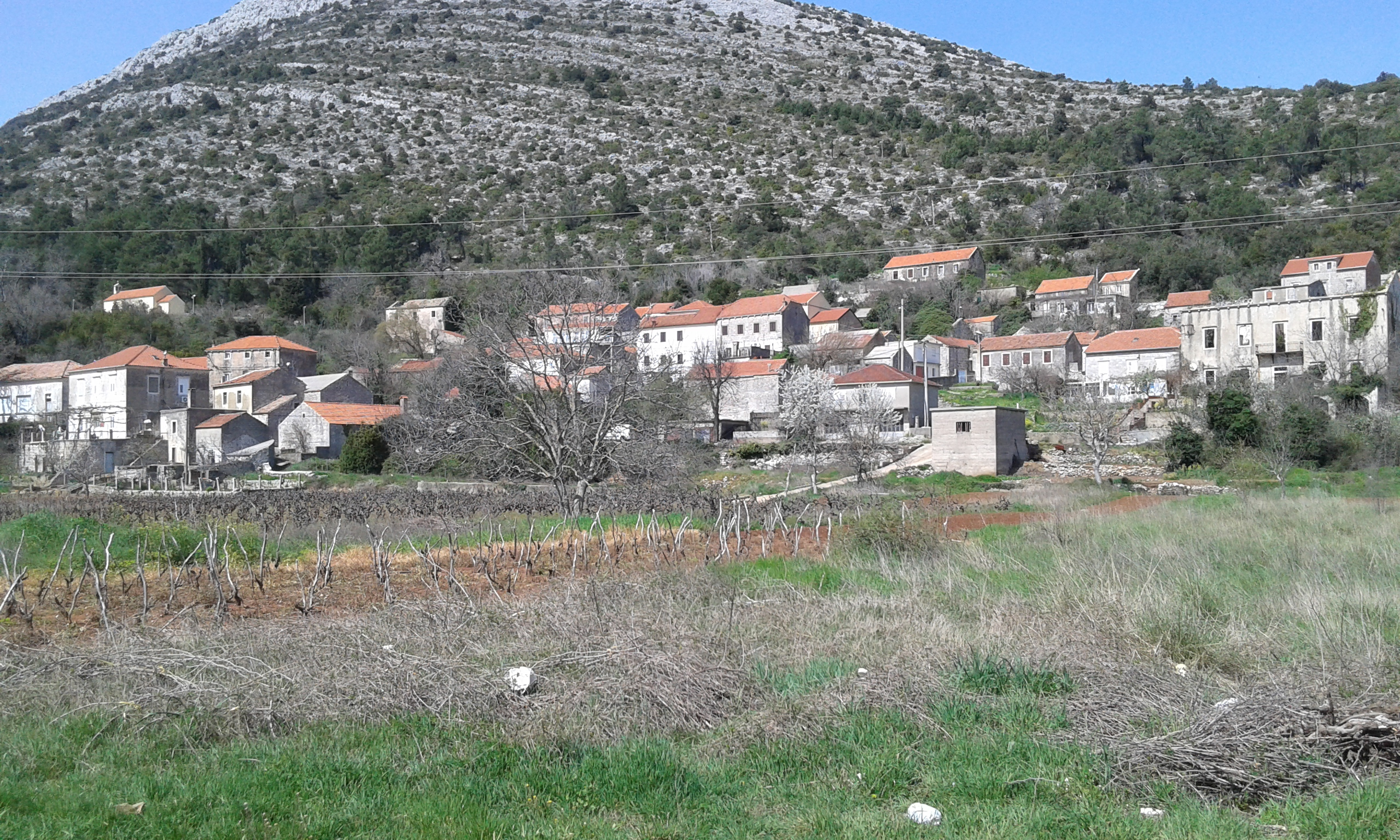

- Location within Croatia
- Coordinates: 42.9822307°N 17.2874313°E
- Country: Croatia
- County: Dubrovnik-Neretva County
- Municipality: Orebić

Area
  - Total: 4.7 sq mi (12.1 km^{2})

Population (2021)
  - Total: 77
  - Density: 16/sq mi (6.4/km^{2})
- Time zone: UTC+1 (CET)
  - Summer (DST): UTC+2 (CEST)

Oskorušno is a village in central Croatia, located on the Pelješac peninsula on the Dalmatian coast.

== History ==
Žarko Bibica, Ivan Cibilić, Mare Delaš, Andrija Jurić, Frane and Niko Marinović, Bariša Matković, Ivo Mastilica, Mato Mratinović, Ivo Orebičić, Anto and Miloš Orhanović, Anto and Ivo Ostojić, Mare and Marija Smolić, Niko Soko, Baldo Šuica, and Frane and Mare Šundrica of Oskorušani are listed on a plaque in Oskorušani as fallen antifascist soldiers in WWII.

== Demographics ==
According to the 2021 census, its population was 77.
