= John Totich =

John Mark Totich MBE (born Ivan Marko Totić, 18 May 1882 – 18 October 1957) was a notable New Zealand gum-digger, boarding-house keeper, community leader and consul. He was born in Kuna, Dalmatia, in 1882.

In the 1954 Queen's Birthday Honours, Totich was appointed a Member of the Order of the British Empire, for social welfare services.
