= Mato Celestin Medović =

Croatian painter (1857–1920)

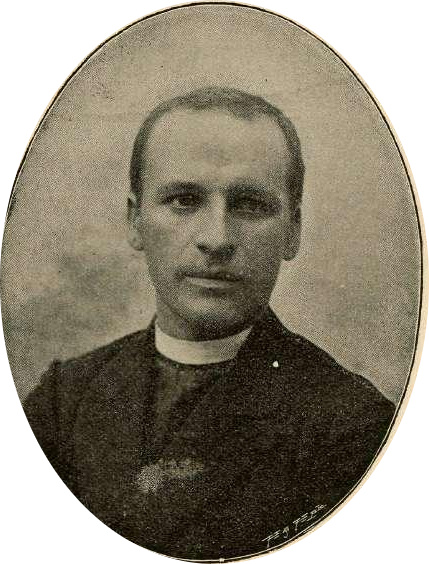
- Medović in 1901
- Born: Mato Medović; 17 November 1857; Kuna at Pelješac, Austrian Empire
- Died: 20 January 1920 (aged 62); Sarajevo, Kingdom of Serbs, Croats and Slovenes
- Education: Academy of Fine Arts, Munich
- Known for: Painting
- Notable work: The Arrival of the Croats (Croatian: Dolazak Hrvata)
- Movement: Modern Art

Mato Celestin Medović (birth name Mato Medović; 17 November 1857 – 20 January 1920) was a Croatian painter. Best known for his large paintings depicting historical scenes, and his series of colourful landscapes and seascapes of his native Dalmatia, Medović is one of the earliest modern Croatian painters.

In his youth Medović was schooled to become a priest in the Franciscan Seminary in Dubrovnik, and was ordained in 1874, taking the name of Celestin. He received his first art training in Italy, and went on to study at the Academy of Fine Arts in Munich, where he began painting artistic impressions of historical events. Following graduation he decided to leave the church and pursue his painting career. Medović then moved to Zagreb and joined a group of artists led by Vlaho Bukovac, a renowned painter. His work from this period includes historical depictions at the building of the Croatian Institute of History. Since 1901 Medović increasingly began to spend time on his native Pelješac in southern Croatia, painting nature, still lifes, seascapes and landscapes in a style marked by his use of colour and light shadows.

== Biography ==
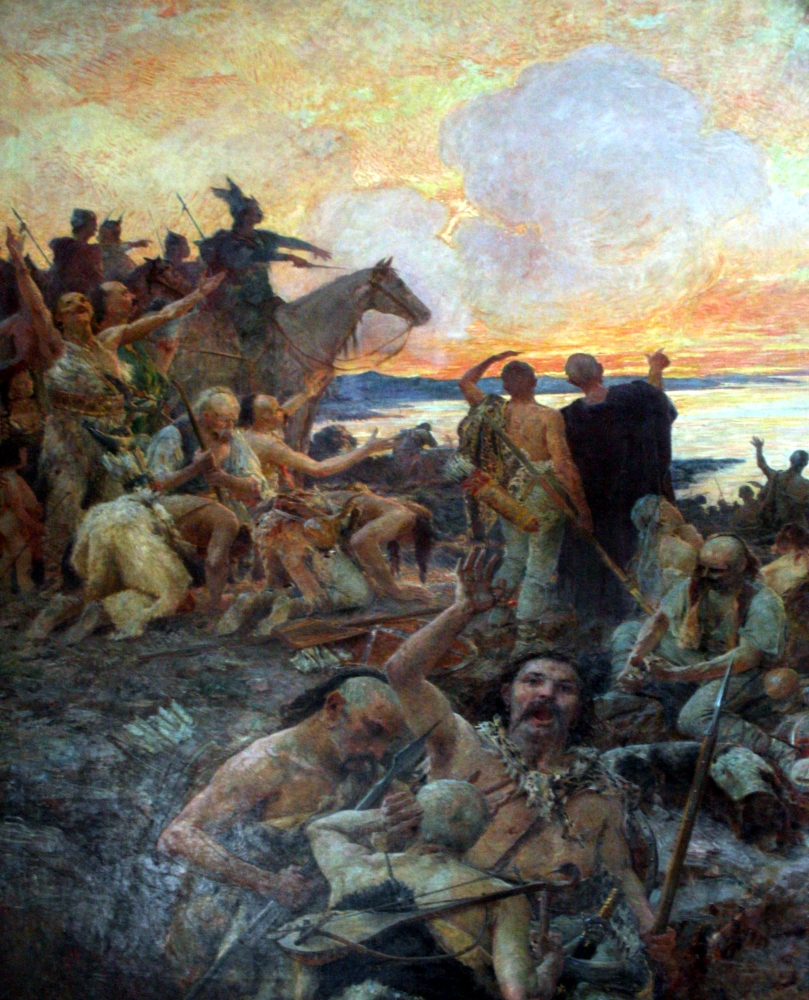
Arrival of the Croats (Croatian: Dolazak Hrvata) by Mato Celestin Medović

Mato Medović was born on 17 November 1857 in Kuna on the Pelješac peninsula into a peasant family. Young Mato got his first education at a nearby Franciscan monastery dedicated to Our Lady of Loreto (Delorita). In 1868, at the age of 11 he joined the Franciscan seminary in Dubrovnik, where he took his vows in 1874, taking the name of Celestin. The artistic talent of the young monk was noticed by Abbot Portoguaro Bernardino, on a visit from Rome. So in 1880, Medović was placed in the monastery of St Isidoro in Rome, known for its Nazarene painters. He was assigned to Lodovico Seitz, an influential artist who painted the frescoes in the Cathedral of Đakovo. However, the rigid and outdated artistic style did not suit Medović, and he looked for a different teacher in Giuseppe Grandi, then in the private school of Antonio Ciseri in Florence.

In 1886, the Franciscan order sent him back to Dubrovnik. However, at the urging of the painter Emil Jakob Schindler, he was sent to continue his studies at the Academy of Arts in Munich. There Medović studied historical genre paintings, particularly the work of Karl von Piloty. He composed large canvases of historical scenes, winning a silver medal in 1893 for his final diploma work "Bacchanal" (Croatian: Bakanal), and successfully exhibited his work in several European cities.

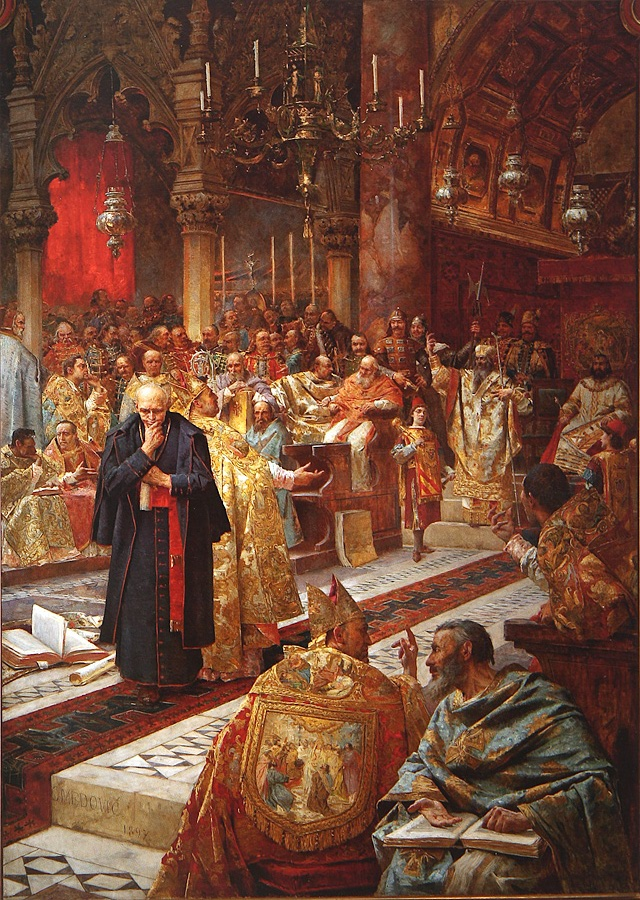
Council of Split, located at the Croatian Institute of History in Zagreb

On his return to Dubrovnik in 1893, there seemed no possibility for further artistic progress. Dr Franjo Rački (a founder member of the Croatian Academy of Sciences and Arts) and Dr Iso Kršnjav (head of the Department of Culture (Croatian: odjela za kulturu)) invited him to Zagreb to join the group of artists around Vlaho Bukovac, a Dubrovnik artist who had recently left Paris and settled in Zagreb. So in 1895 Medović left the Franciscan order and set up a studio in Zagreb. During his stay there (1895–1907) he painted many religious works in northern Croatian churches (Križevci, Požega, Nova Gradiška) and historical compositions based on Croatian history, most notably those in the Golden Hall (Croatian: Zlatne dvorane) of the Institute of History in Zagreb. Medović also painted a series of portraits of Zagreb people using fragmented lines, soft contours and vibrant colours.

In 1898, Medović had a house and studio built in Kuna, and a villa on the coast at Crkvice. He began to spend increasing amounts of time there, painting nature. In 1901, he held a group exhibit with Oton Iveković, in which he presented his entire Zagreb works. Until 1907 Medović was kept busy with government works in Zagreb and exhibited with other Croatian artists in Budapest, Copenhagen, Paris, Prague, Belgrade, Sofia and Zagreb.

After 1908, Medović gave up his Zagreb studio entirely and remained on the Pelješac peninsula, living alone and painting. His subjects were taken from the nature around him, still lifes of fruit and fish, seascapes, and landscapes, filled with colour, light and soft shadows. His seascapes are studies of light playing on the open sea, breaking waves or a moonlit night.

After a few years Medović grew tired of the isolation from other artists, and for a short time worked in Vienna (1912–1914). In 1914 he held an exhibition, where he sold all his paintings. At the start of the First World War he again went back to Kuna where the harsh living conditions took their toll on his health. By the end of the war Medović was suffering from renal disease and in late December 1919 he sought help at a hospital in Sarajevo, but too late. He died on 20 January 1920, and was laid to rest in the cemetery in Kuna.

== Legacy ==
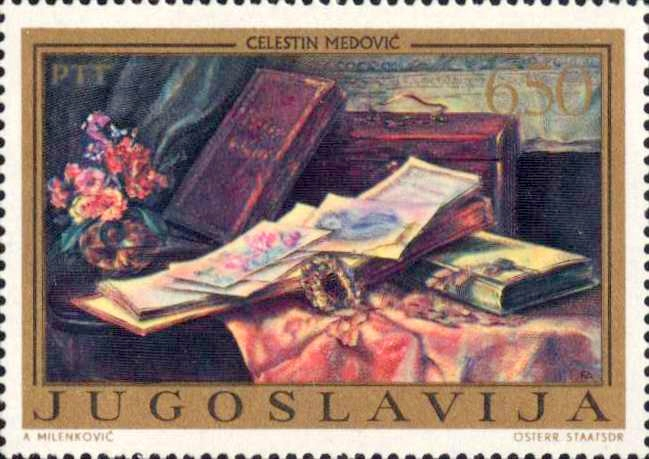
Stamp from Yugoslavia honouring Medović, 1972

Medović's time in Italy did not leave a lasting impression his work. His paintings from the time can be found in a few Franciscan monasteries, for example Fucecchio, Faenza, and Cesena.

His years spent at the Academy of Art in Munich (1888–1893) were more formative. There he adopted the style and neutral colors typical of the late 19th century. Some very well preserved portraits ("Mother" (Croatian: Majka), "Old Fisherman" (Croatian: Stari ribar), "Portrait of an old man" (Croatian: Portret starca)) are impressive studies of elderly people. A few paintings of saints, for example "St. Bonaventura", painted during this period, all reveal a high quality realistic interpretation.

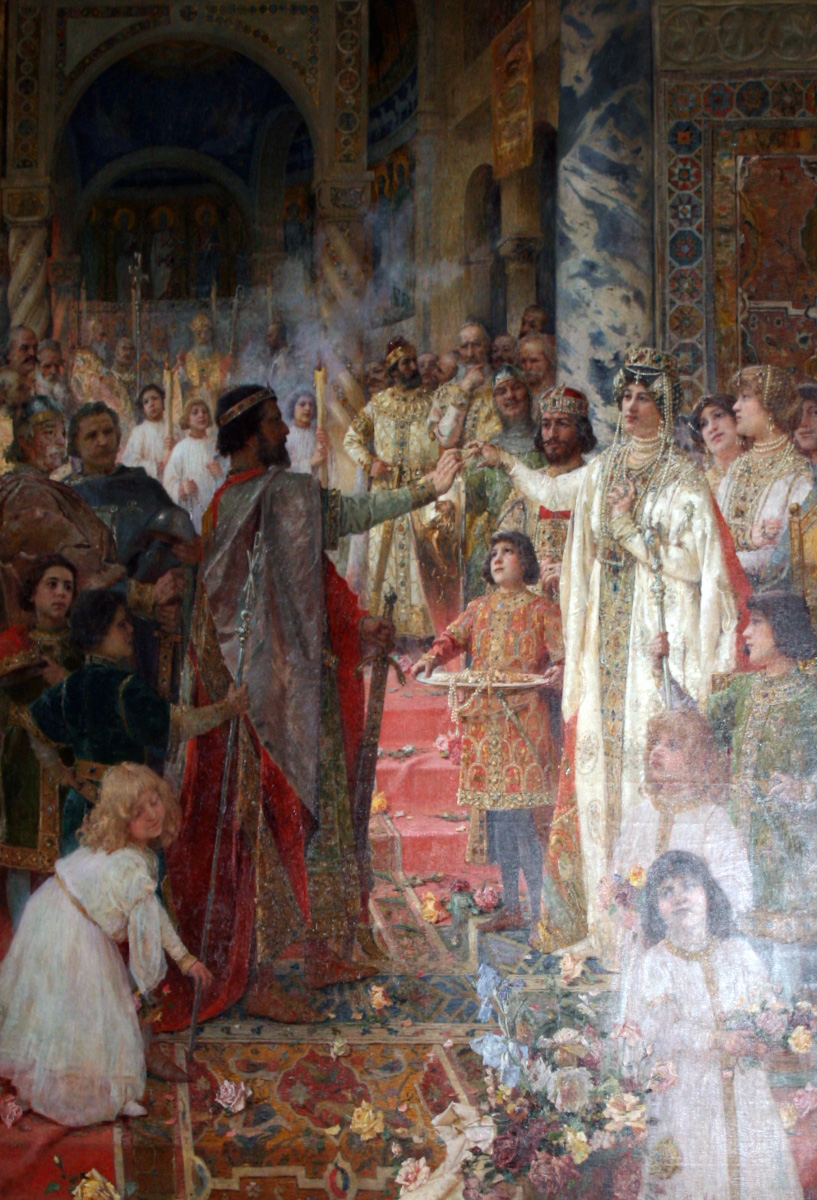
"Betrothal of King Zvonimir"

During his time in Zagreb (1895–1907), Medović gradually absorbed some of Bukovac's techniques and brighter colours into his own artistic personality. His large historical compositions, "Srijemski Martyr" (Croatian: Srijemski mučenik)", "Split Parliament" (Croatian: Splitski sabor), "Arrival of the Croats" (Croatian: Dolazak Hrvata), "Betrothal of King Zvonimir" (Croatian: Zaruke kralja Zvonimira), and "The Coronation of King Ladislas" (Croatian: Krunidba kralja Ladislava) demonstrate Medović's eye for detail and his skillful interpretation of the subject. Portraits from this time include the expressive "St. Francis", and some drawings and paintings of the people of Zagreb.

Medović's work on the Pelješac peninsula marked a complete departure in technique and themes. He painted still lifes, seascapes, and landscapes, which were new genres in Croatian art at the time. His palette became lighter and brighter as he worked outdoors: browns, greys and dull greens became purer, and were joined the purple of heather, the yellow of broom, and the rich array of blues of the sea. Abandoning his previously detailed style, his smaller studies from nature are more creative. With thick impasto and impulsive brush strokes, around 1907 a new style emerged in his work – pointillism in a light, bright colours, that he used for his landscapes of Pelješac. Initially (1908–1912), these were disciplined strokes on larger canvases, but in his later (1914–1918), smaller paintings with impressionistically captured motifs, the strokes became softer and more diffuse colours. He was one of the first Croatian artists to paint the coastal landscapes, and it dominated his work after the turn of the century.

Medović was a versatile artist, among the first generation of modern Croatian painters. He was the leader in historical and religious paintings (from intimate images of saints to altarpieces such as those on the island of Pašman, the town of Baška on the island of Krk, and Vrboska on the island of Hvar). He painted some fine portraits, and Medović was the only Croatian artist in this period painting still lifes. However, his major contribution to Croatian painting is his series of landscapes, full of bright southern light and vigorous colours.

His hometown of Kuna now hosts an art colony, and art gallery in his name - KUD Mato Celestin Medović.

Medovic's painting of "Pelješko - korčulanski kanal", 1908–1912 appeared on a Croatian Post Office stamp in 1996.

== Works ==
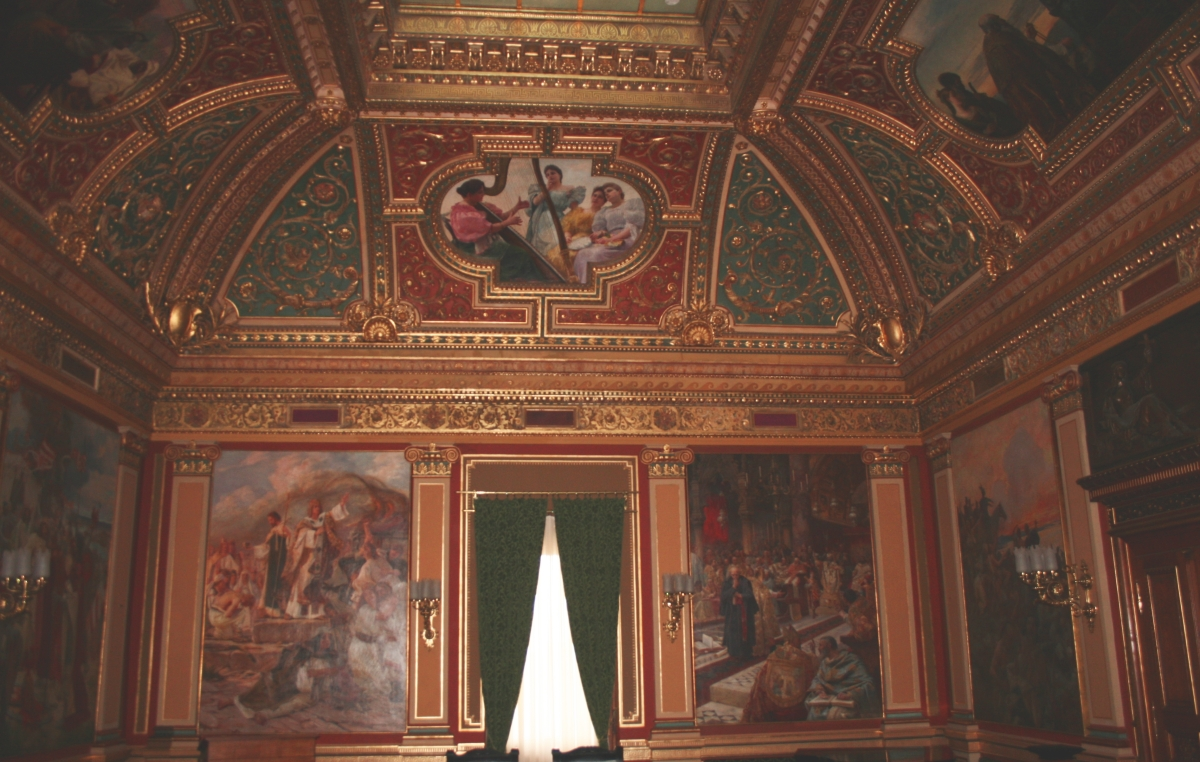
The Golden Hall of the Institute of History in Zagreb, with paintings by Mato Celestin Medović

=== Munich paintings ===
- Mother (Portret Majka) 1894
- Old Fisherman (Stari ribar)
- Portrait of an old man (Portret starca)
- St. Bonaventura
- Bacchanal (Bakanal) 1890

=== Zagreb paintings ===
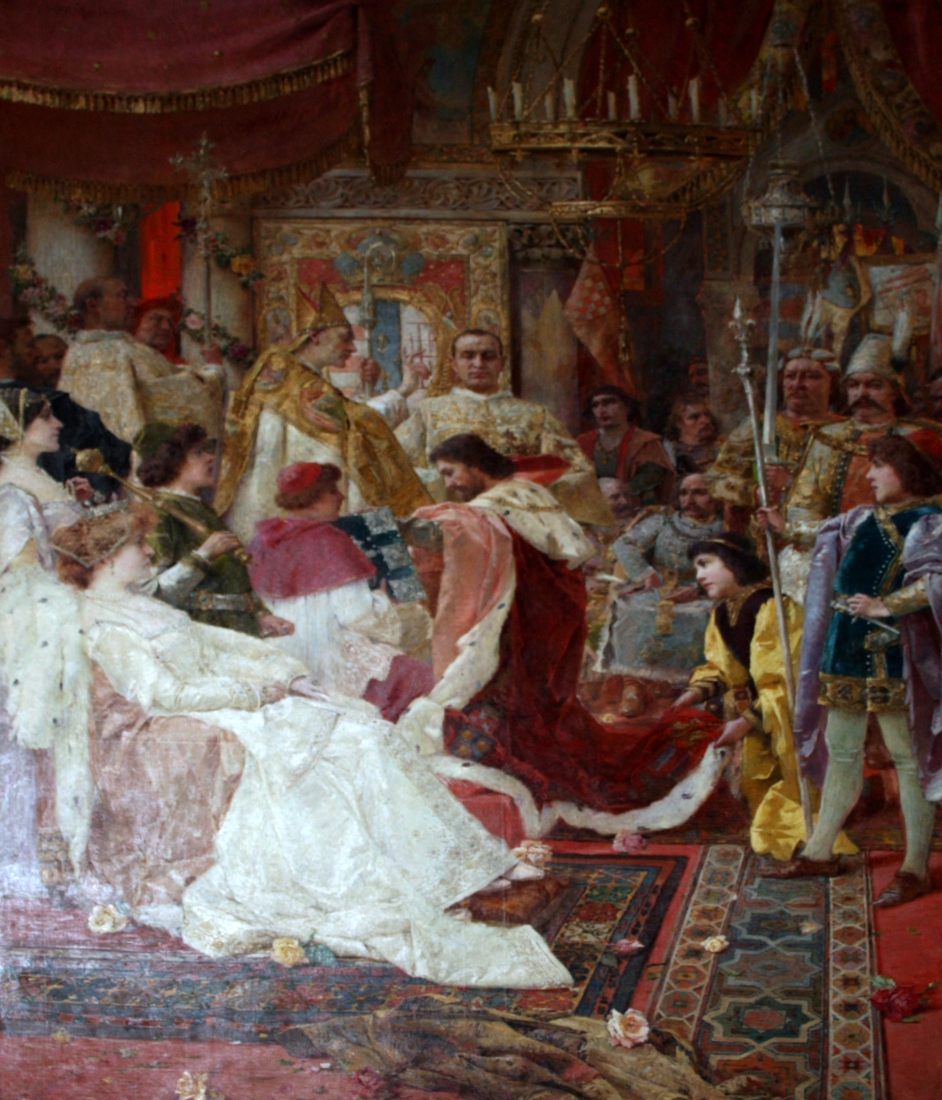
"The Coronation of Ladislas of Naples"

- Split Parliament (Splitski sabor)
- Arrival of the Croats (Dolazak Hrvata),
- The Coronation of Ladislas of Naples (Krunjenje Ladislava Napuljskog)
- Betrothal of King Zvonimir (Zaruke kralja Zvonimira)
- The Srijem Martyrs (Srijemski mučenici)
- St Jeronim 1901
- Madonna (Bogorodica) 1905
- St Francis
- Portrait of Clotilde Guthardt
- Portrait of middle-aged woman
- Portrait of Archbishop Posilovic
- Portrait of Pope Pius X

=== Pelješac paintings ===
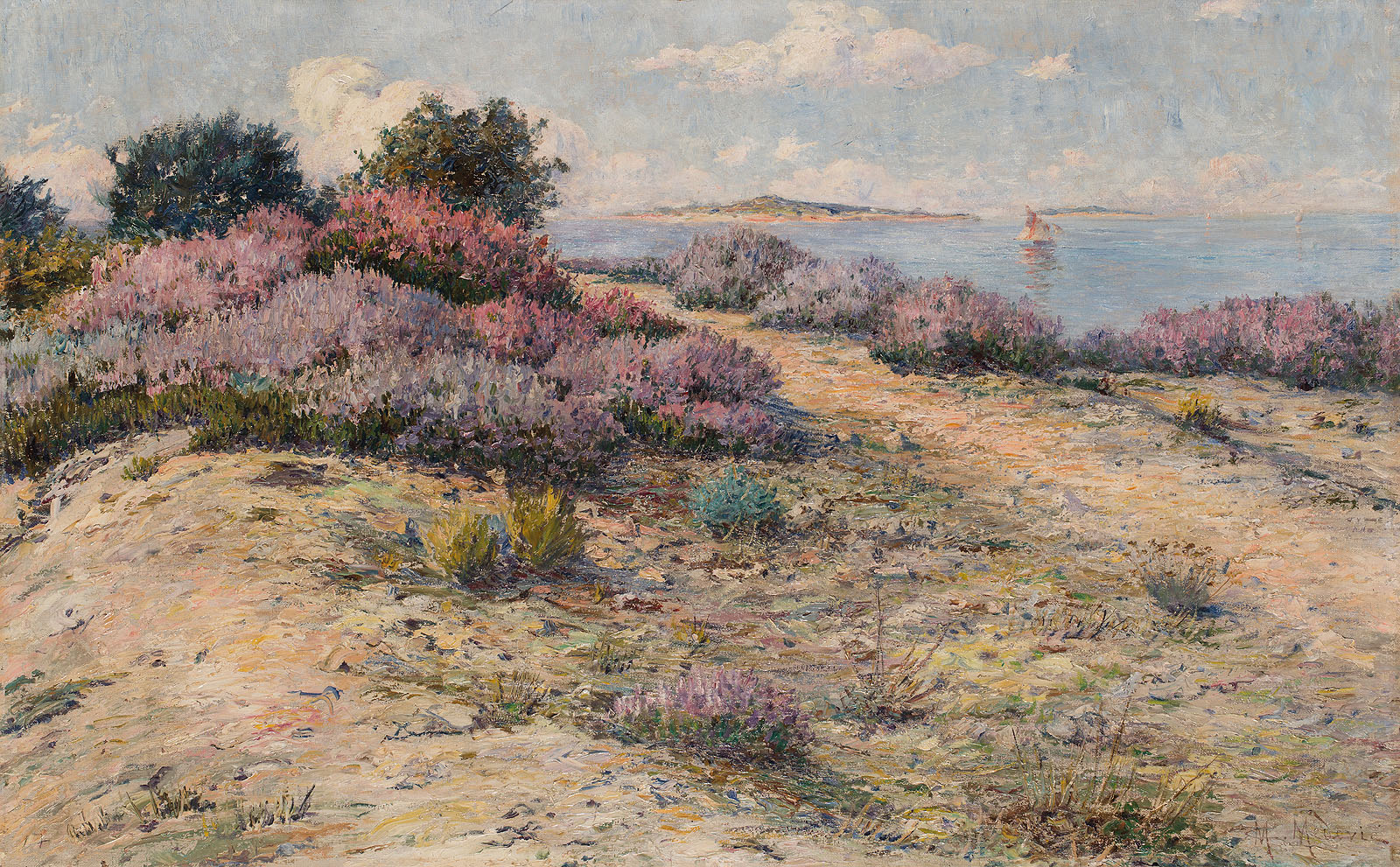
"Heather" (Vrijes)

- Dead Calm Sea (Bonaca)
- After Spring Rains (Poslije proljetne kiše)
- Pelješac Korčula Canal(Pelješko Korčulanski Kanal) 1908-12
- Moonlight (Mjesečina)
- Heather (Vrijes) 1911
- Landscape (Pejzaž)
- Fields (Polje)
- Heather (Vrijes)
- Still Life (Mrtva Priroda)
- Battle of Grobnik Plain (Bitka Na Grobničkom Polju)

== Exhibitions ==
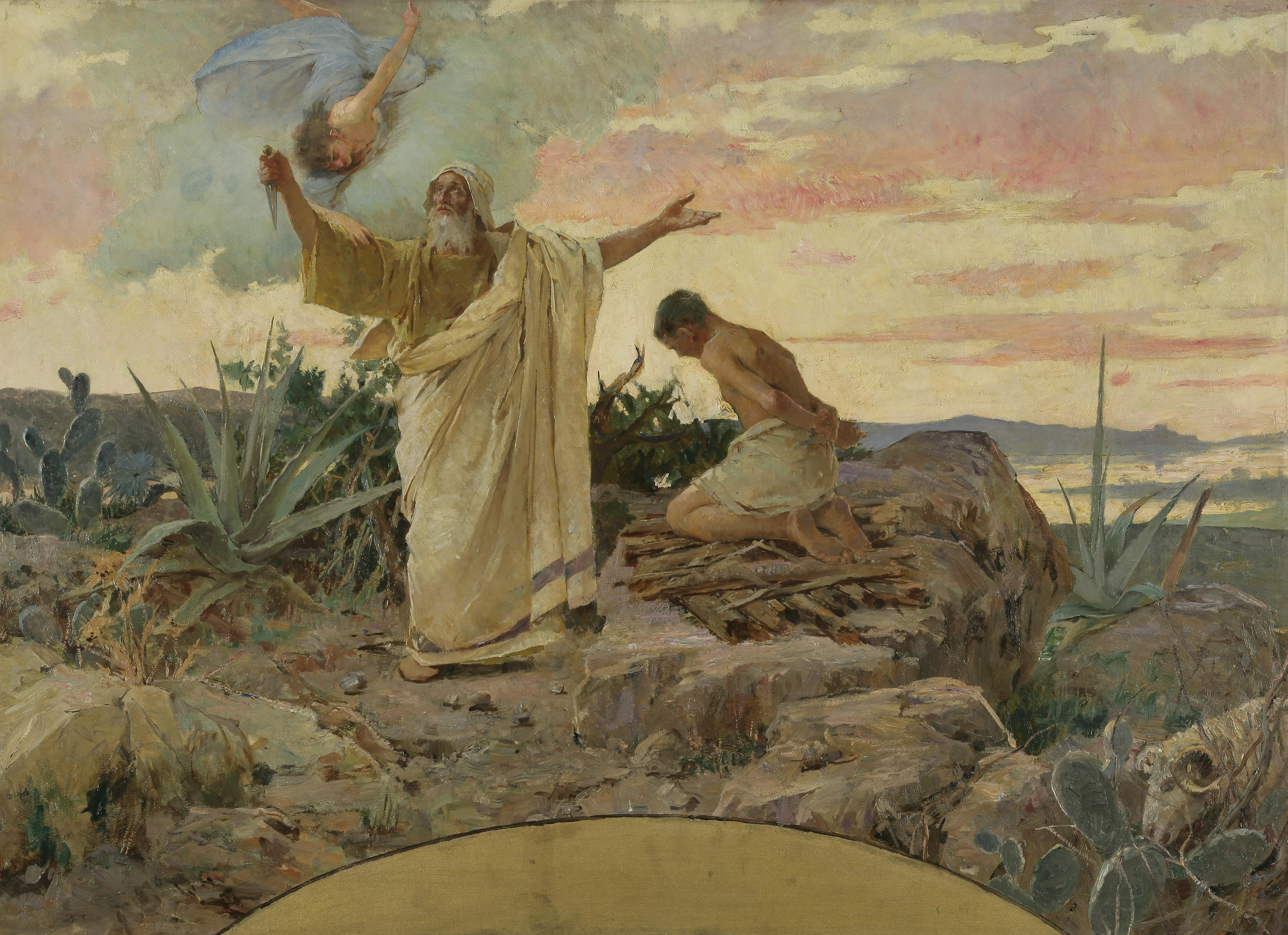
"The Sacrifice of Isaac"

=== Solo ===
- 2001 Mato Celestin Medović: Works from the Gallery's permanent collection Gallery of Fine Arts, Split (Galerija Umjetnina Split)
- 2007/2008 MATO CELESTIN MEDOVIĆ: An exhibition marking the 150th anniversary of his birth. From the holdings of the Museum of Modern Art, Dubrovnik

=== Group ===
- 2009 Zagreb - Munich: Croatian Painting and the Academy of Fine Arts in Munich, Art Pavilion Zagreb, Zagreb (Croatian: Umjetnicki paviljon)
- 2007 From the Gallery Collection, Museum of Modern Art, Dubrovnik
- 2006 Selection from the Museum of Modern Art Dubrovnik Collection, Museum of Modern Art, Dubrovnik
- 1896 Millennial Exhibition in Budapest

=== Museum collections ===
- Modern Gallery, Zagreb
- Museum of Modern Art Dubrovnik, Dubrovnik
- Gallery of Fine Arts, Split (Galerija Umjetnina Split)

== Bibliography ==
- Vera Kružić Uchytil:Mato Celestin Medović, Monograph, colour photographs Mitja Koman; black and white photographs Ivica Buzjak, Mitja Koman, Mladen Grčević, published 1978 by Grafički zavod Hrvatske in Zagreb. (Croatian)
- Zdenko Rus: Medović, Celestin Mato, in: The Dictionary of Art, hrsg. v. Jane Turner, Band 21, 1996. (ISBN 1-884446-00-0)
