= Ivan Tomašević (activist) =

New Zealand labourer and political activist

Ivan Tomašević (10 March 1897 – 31 August 1988) was a New Zealand labourer and political activist. He was born in Košarni Do, a village near Orebić, Croatia in 1897.
