= Trstenik, Dubrovnik-Neretva County =

Trstenik
- Village
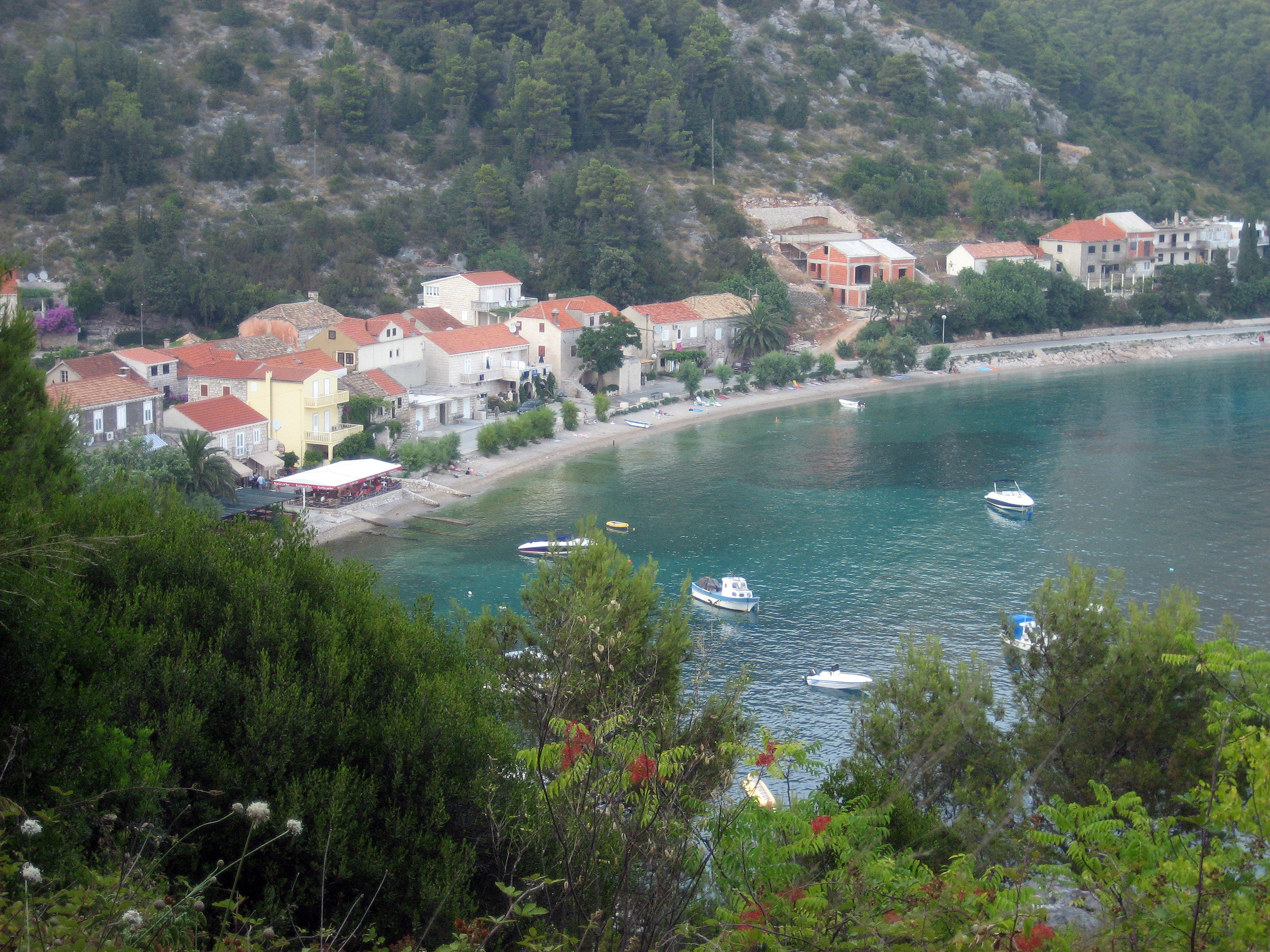
- Interactive map of Trstenik
- Location within Croatia
- Coordinates: 42.916311°N 17.398309°E
- Country: Croatia
- County: Dubrovnik-Neretva County
- Municipality: Orebić

Area
  - Total: 1.7 sq mi (4.4 km^{2})

Population (2021)
  - Total: 115
  - Density: 68/sq mi (26/km^{2})
- Time zone: UTC+1 (CET)
  - Summer (DST): UTC+2 (CEST)

Trstenik is a village on the Pelješac peninsula in southern Dalmatia, Croatia.

== History ==
Trstenik's historical facts are connected closely to the European Phylloxera vine event. The 'Great French Wine Blight' was a severe blight of the mid-19th century that destroyed many of the vineyards in France and laid to waste the wine industry. The transfer of American vines and plants into Europe greatly increased between roughly 1858 and 1862, and this is how the Phylloxera was accidentally introduced to Europe around 1860. It is believed that the introduction of the blight-causing Phylloxera was not a problem before the advent of steamships, which were faster and hence allowed the Phylloxera to survive the quicker ocean voyage.

At that time the vine growers in Dalmatia sold their grapes on the international market, where the Phylloxera arrived with a nearly 40 years of delay. Trstenik flourished in becoming a busy port for selling grapes to Italy and beyond.

Today, Trstenik's wine producers export their products to international markets and sell directly to visitors anchored in the town's bay

== Demographics ==
According to the 2021 census, its population was 115. It was 116 in 2011.
