= Alexander Vucinich =

American historian

Alexander S. Vucinich
- Born: October 23, 1914; Wilmington, California, U.S.
- Died: May 25, 2002 (aged 87); Berkeley, California, U.S.
- Education: University of Belgrade
- Occupations: Historian; Educator; Academic

Alexander S. Vucinich (October 23, 1914 – May 25, 2002) was an American historian. He taught at the department of history and sociology of science at the University of Pennsylvania from 1976 until his retirement in 1985. He also taught at San Jose State College (1950–64), the University of Illinois (1964–70), and the University of Texas (1970–76). After his retirement he and his wife Dorothy moved to Berkeley, California, where he participated in the activities of Berkeley's Institute of Slavic, East European, and Eurasian Studies. His field of research was the history of science and social thought in Russia and the Soviet Union.

Alexander Vucinich had a brother, Wayne S. Vucinich, who was a professor of Eastern European studies at Stanford University.

== Life ==
Vucinich was born in 1914 in the United States to a family of Serb immigrants who had come from Bosnia several years before his birth. When he was three years old, both of his parents died in the 1918 flu pandemic, after which he and his older brother Wayne went to live with an uncle in Serbia. Vucinich graduated from the University of Belgrade in 1938, then returned to the United States, where he earned an M.A. at the University of California, Berkeley, and a Ph.D. in sociology in 1950 from Columbia University in New York City.

== Scholarly legacy ==
According to Alfred Rieber,

Beyond the obvious erudition and scope of his work, there was an underlying mission, as it were, to restore the rational and analytical aspects of Russian intellectual life to their rightful place in history. Much of that tradition had been ignored or undervalued in the Western literature. When Alex began to publish there was still a powerful interpretive current among American and British specialists to treat Russian intellectual history and social thought in terms of a non-rationality and collectivism that separated them from the mainstream of "Western" thought.... As for his attitude toward Soviet scholars, that too was unusually reasonable. Although he based his work mainly on primary sources, he did not neglect the contributions of the leading Soviet specialists in the history of science...

Loren Graham wrote that

...as a sociologist, he followed the views of Robert Merton in defending science from ideological incursions, whether those threats came from the Russian Orthodox Church or from disciples of Marxism. Science was to him the mark of modernity, and he had little patience with its critics.

In 2001 the American Association for the Advancement of Slavic Studies bestowed on Vucinich its Distinguished Contributions Award for lifetime accomplishments.

== Selected works ==
- Soviet Economic Institutions: The Social Structure of Production Units, Stanford University Press, 1952.
- The Soviet Academy of Sciences, Stanford University Press, 1956.
- Science in Russian Culture: A History to 1860, Stanford University Press, 1963.
- Science in Russian Culture: 1861-1917, Stanford University Press, 1970.
- Social Thought in Tsarist Russia: The Quest for a General Science of Society, University of Chicago Press, 1976.
- Empire of Knowledge: The Academy of Sciences of the USSR, 1917-1970, University of California Press, 1984.
- Darwin in Russian Thought, University of California Press, 1988.
- Einstein and Soviet Ideology, Stanford University Press, 2001.
