= Podobuče =

- Village
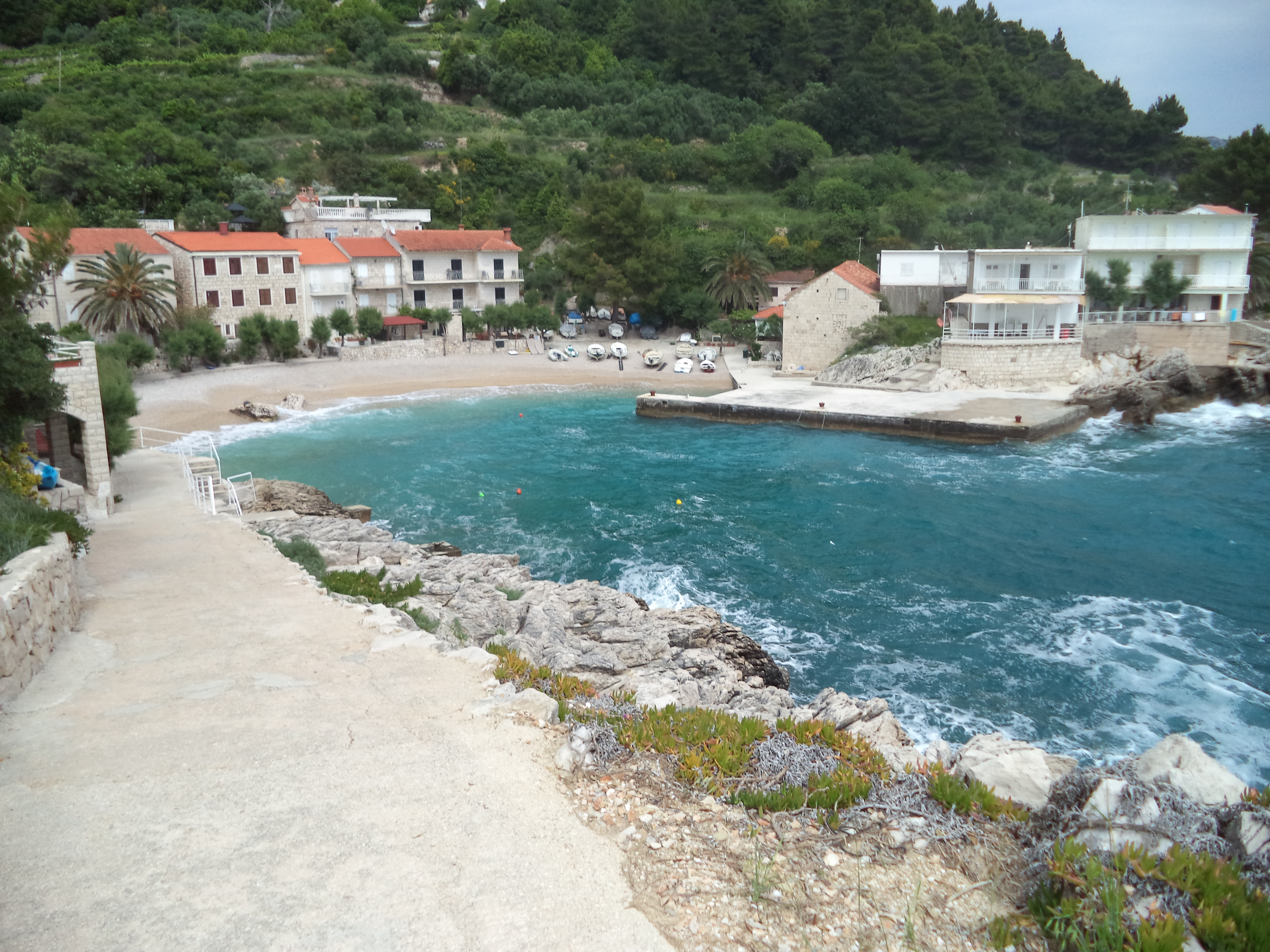

- Location within Croatia
- Coordinates: 42.9532204°N 17.2641225°E
- Country: Croatia
- County: Dubrovnik-Neretva County
- Municipality: Orebić

Area
  - Total: 2.7 sq mi (6.9 km^{2})

Population (2021)
  - Total: 37
  - Density: 14/sq mi (5.4/km^{2})
- Time zone: UTC+1 (CET)
  - Summer (DST): UTC+2 (CEST)

Podobuče is a village in Croatia, located on the Pelješac peninsula on the Dalmatian coast.

== Demographics ==
According to the 2021 census, its population was 37.
