= Kuna Pelješka =

- Village
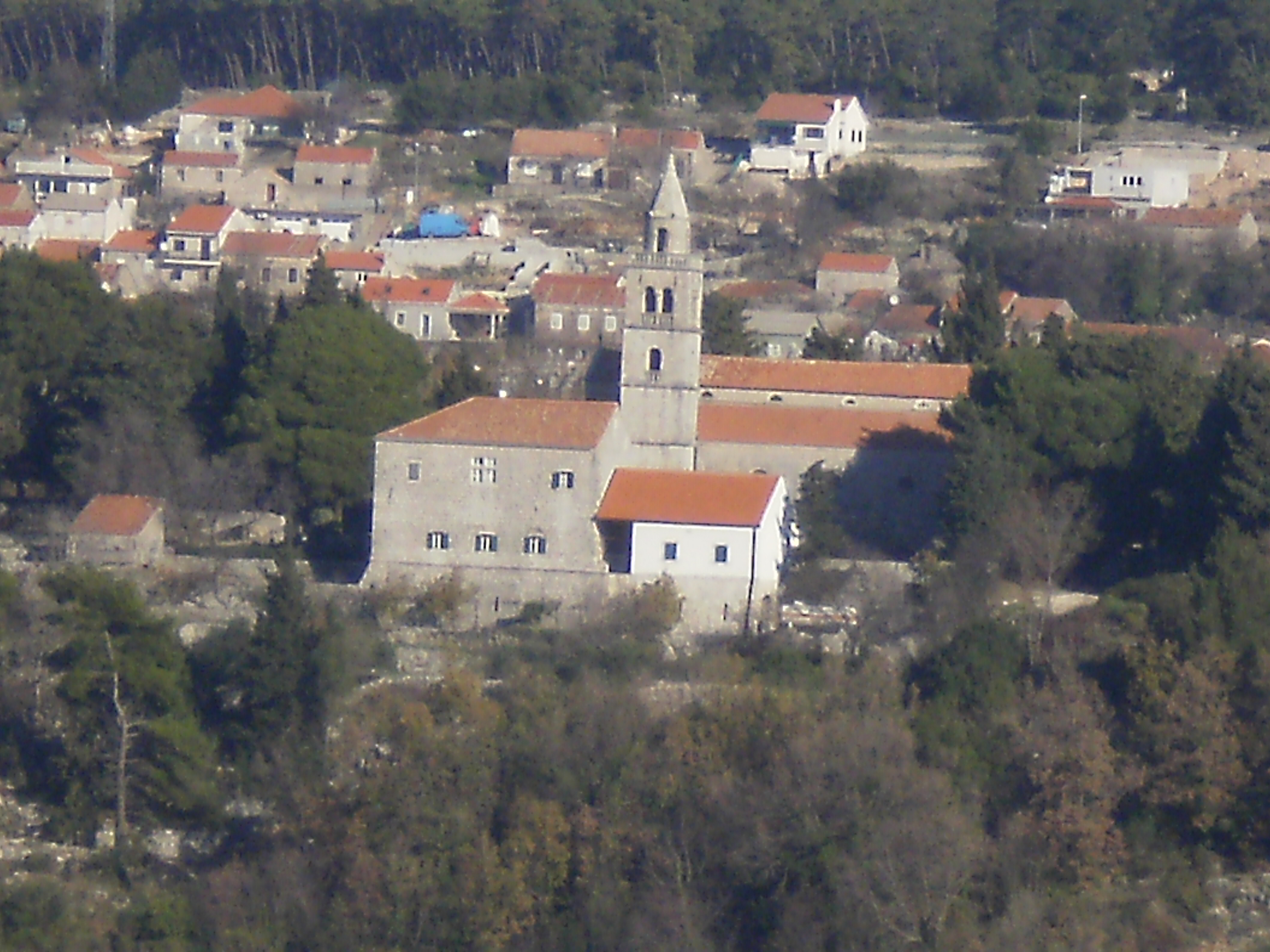

- Location within Croatia
- Coordinates: 42.96909°N 17.3352741°E
- Country: Croatia
- County: Dubrovnik-Neretva County
- Municipality: Orebić

Area
  - Total: 4.1 sq mi (10.5 km^{2})

Population (2021)
  - Total: 211
  - Density: 52.0/sq mi (20.1/km^{2})
- Time zone: UTC+1 (CET)
  - Summer (DST): UTC+2 (CEST)

Kuna Pelješka is a village in Croatia, located on the Pelješac peninsula on the Dalmatian coast.

== Climate ==
Since records began in 1981, the highest temperature recorded at the local weather station was 39.2 °C (102.6 °F), on 22 August 2000. The coldest temperature was −9.0 °C (15.8 °F), on 13 January 1985.

== Demographics ==
According to the 2021 census, its population was 211.
