= Potomje =

- Village
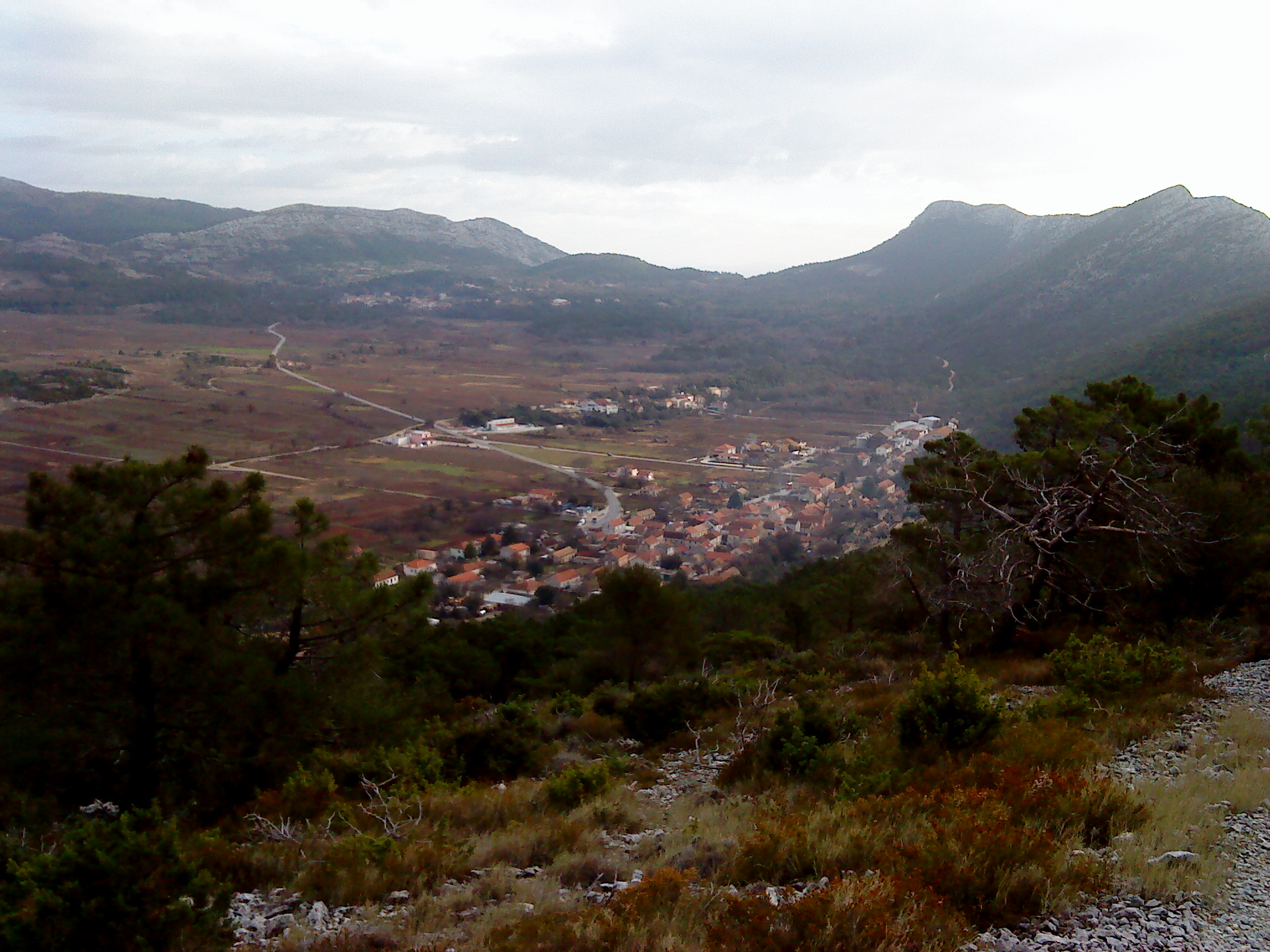
- Interactive map of Potomje
- Location within Croatia
- Country: Croatia
- County: Dubrovnik-Neretva County
- Municipality: Orebić

Area
  - Total: 3.3 sq mi (8.5 km^{2})

Population (2021)
  - Total: 209
  - Density: 64/sq mi (25/km^{2})
- Time zone: UTC+1 (CET)
  - Summer (DST): UTC+2 (CEST)

Potomje is a settlement in Croatia. It is connected by the D414 road.

== Demographics ==
According to the 2021 census, its population was 209.
