= Zvonimir Roso =

Croatian criminologist and psychologist

Zvonimir Roso (March 6, 1938 – March 4, 1997) was a Croatian criminologist and psychologist, one of South-eastern Europe's foremost authorities in the science of polygraph and the founder of what is now known as "Zagreb School of Polygraph".

Roso was born in Kuna Pelješka and lived in Zagreb, Croatia. He earned his BA in Psychology from University of Zagreb (Croatia) and later pursued postgraduate studies in psychotherapy at the School Of Medicine, University Of Zagreb. He received a master's degree in criminology from Skopje University and was professor at the Police Academy of Zagreb.

Zvonimir Roso is the author of two highly regarded books: Polygraph in Crime Investigation (Poligraf u kriminalistici, Zagreb, 1987) and Informative Conversation and Interview (Informativni razgovor i intervju, Zagreb, 1988, 1995). Written from an interdisciplinary perspective, his works are considered the most comprehensive text on polygraph ever published in South-eastern Europe. They are studied not only by criminologists, but also by students of law and psychology.

In the book Polygraph in Crime Investigation (Poligraf u kriminalistici) Zvonimir Roso explores the possibilities of application of the polygraph technique and gives a history of lie detection methods. He presents the physiological and psychological basis of polygraph examination, experimental studies of blood pressure, pulse, respiration and galvanic skin reflex (G.S.R.). Book explains polygraph methods, the handling of polygraph recordings and interpretation of the results. The author advocates comparative advantages of POT (Peak of Tension Test) and GKT (Guilty Knowledge Test) over CQT (Control Questions Technique). Observations on the legal status of the polygraph, the admissibility of the results of polygraph testing, the opinions of leading Croatian lawyers and crime investigators and some court decisions, which serve as legal precedents, are mentioned. The book contains studies of actual cases.

At the time when Zvonimir Roso was first introduced to the polygraph, the use of the "lie-detector" as a tool in criminal investigation, was almost unheard of in Eastern Europe. As a pioneer in the field Roso was successful in solving some of the most complex criminal cases. Through his career he had amassed a remarkable body of work and scientific writings, and uniquely combined practice and scholarly work in criminology and forensic psychophysiology.

The recipient of numerous honors, a distinguished member of the Croatian Association of Psychologists, an extraordinary scientist and practitioner, Zvonimir Roso saw the polygraph as an auxiliary tool in crime investigation and was against its use as a diagnostic tool to absolutely verify guilt or innocence of a person (or suspect).

Roso introduced standards of practice modeled after those of the American Polygraph Association.

He advocated the need for systematic education of polygraph examiners and inspired the Croatian forensic psychophysiologists to cooperate more closely with their colleagues abroad, to exchange experience, and to become members of APA (American Polygraph Association).
