= D112 road =

Road in Croatia

D112 state road

Route information
- Length: 1.9 km (1.2 mi)

Major junctions
- From: Rogač ferry port
- To: D111 in Grohote

Location
- Country: Croatia
- Counties: Split-Dalmatia

Highway system
- Highways in Croatia

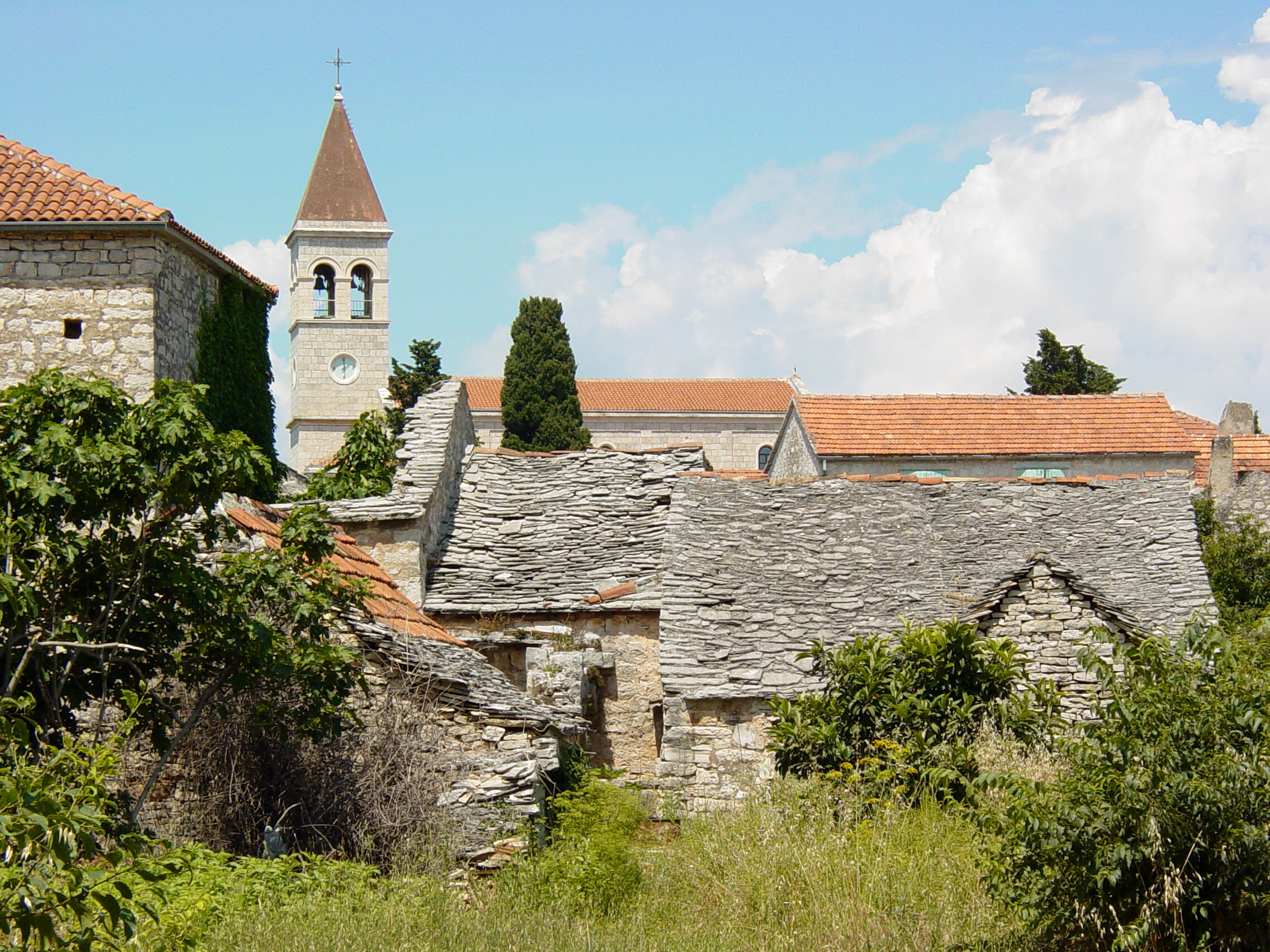
Grohote, at the southern terminus the D112 road

D112 is a state road on the island of Šolta in Croatia connecting ferry port of Rogač, from where Jadrolinija ferries fly to the mainland, docking in Split and the D410 state road to the D111 state road, the main road on the island. The road is 1.9 km (1.2 mi) long.

The road, as well as all other state roads in Croatia, is managed and maintained by Hrvatske ceste, a state-owned company.

== Traffic volume ==
Traffic volume is not counted directly at the D112 road, however Hrvatske ceste (HC), operator of the road reports number of vehicles using Split – Rogač ferry line, connecting the D112 road to the D410 state road. Substantial variations between annual (AADT) and summer (ASDT) traffic volumes are attributed to the fact that the road connects a number of island resorts to the mainland.

D112 traffic volume
Road	Counting site	AADT	ASDT	Notes
D112	636 Split – Rogač	148	306	Vehicles using Split-Rogač ferry line.

== Road junctions and populated areas ==
D112 junctions/populated areas
Type	Slip roads/Notes
	Rogač ferry port – access to the mainland port of Split (by Jadrolinija) and the D410 state road to Split and A1 motorway Dugopolje interchange. The northern terminus of the road.
	Rogač
	Grohote; D111 to Maslinica (to the west) and Stomorska (to the east). The southern terminus of the road.

== See also ==
- Hrvatske ceste
- Jadrolinija
