= D111 road =

Road in Croatia

D111 state road

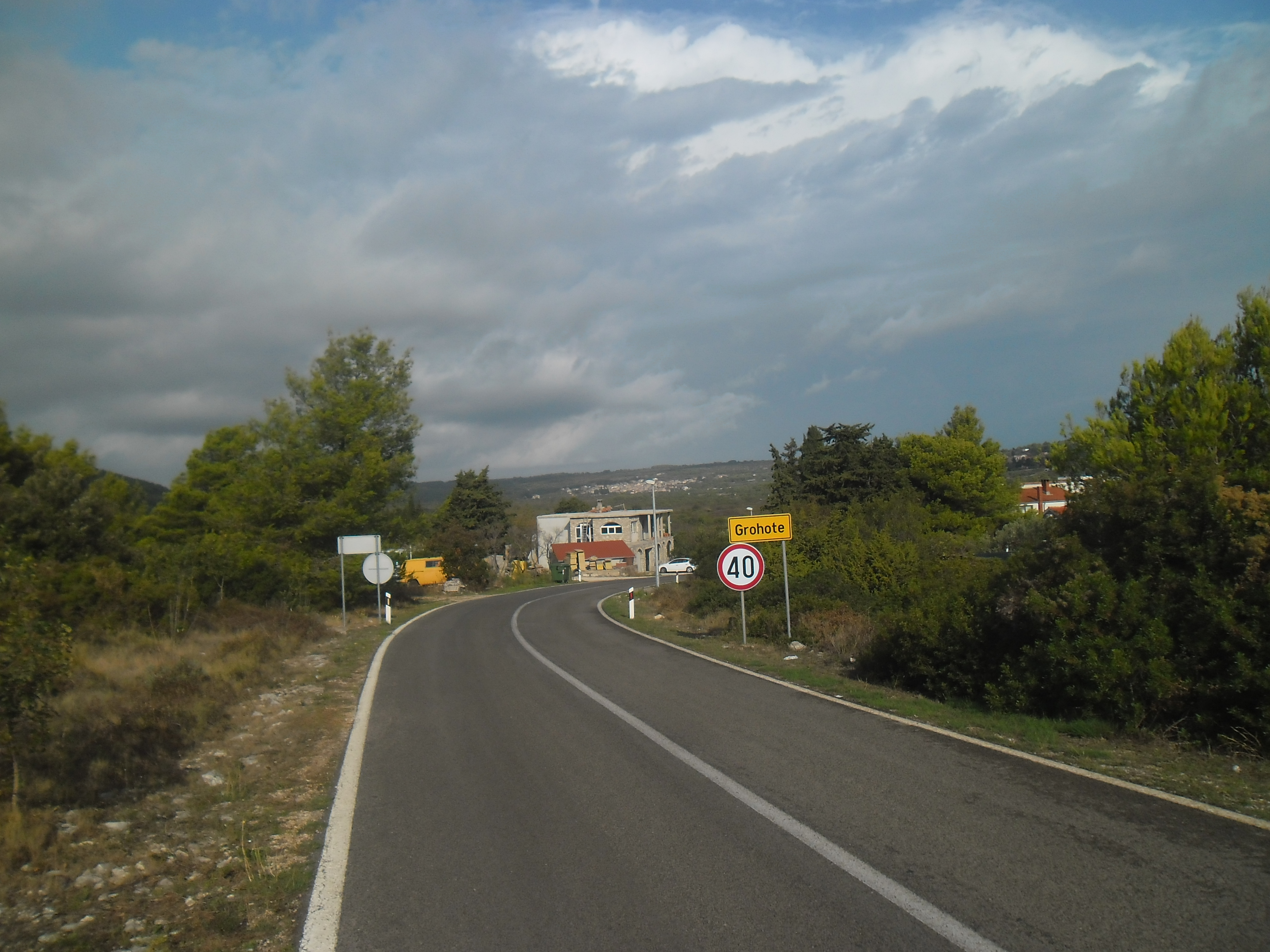

Route information
- Length: 17.8 km (11.1 mi)

Major junctions
- From: Maslinica
- D112 in Grohote
- To: Stomorska

Location
- Country: Croatia
- Counties: Split-Dalmatia

Highway system
- Highways in Croatia

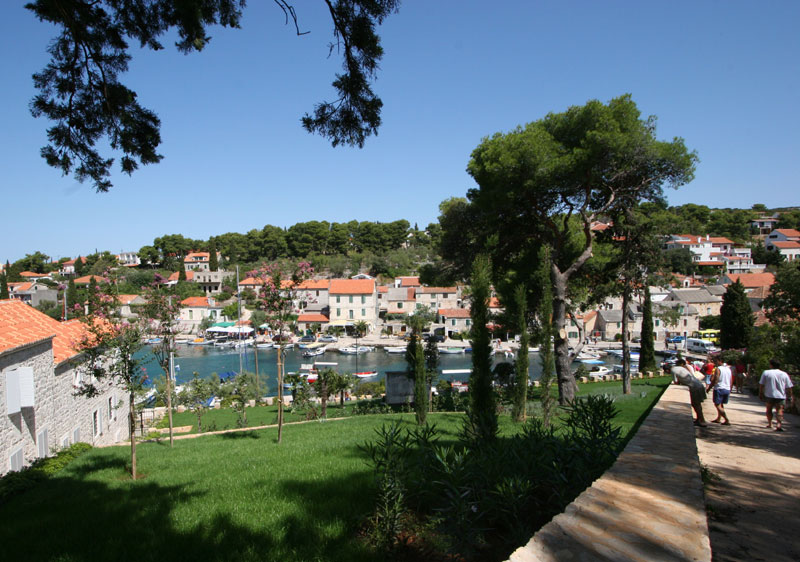
Maslinica, at the western terminus the D111 road

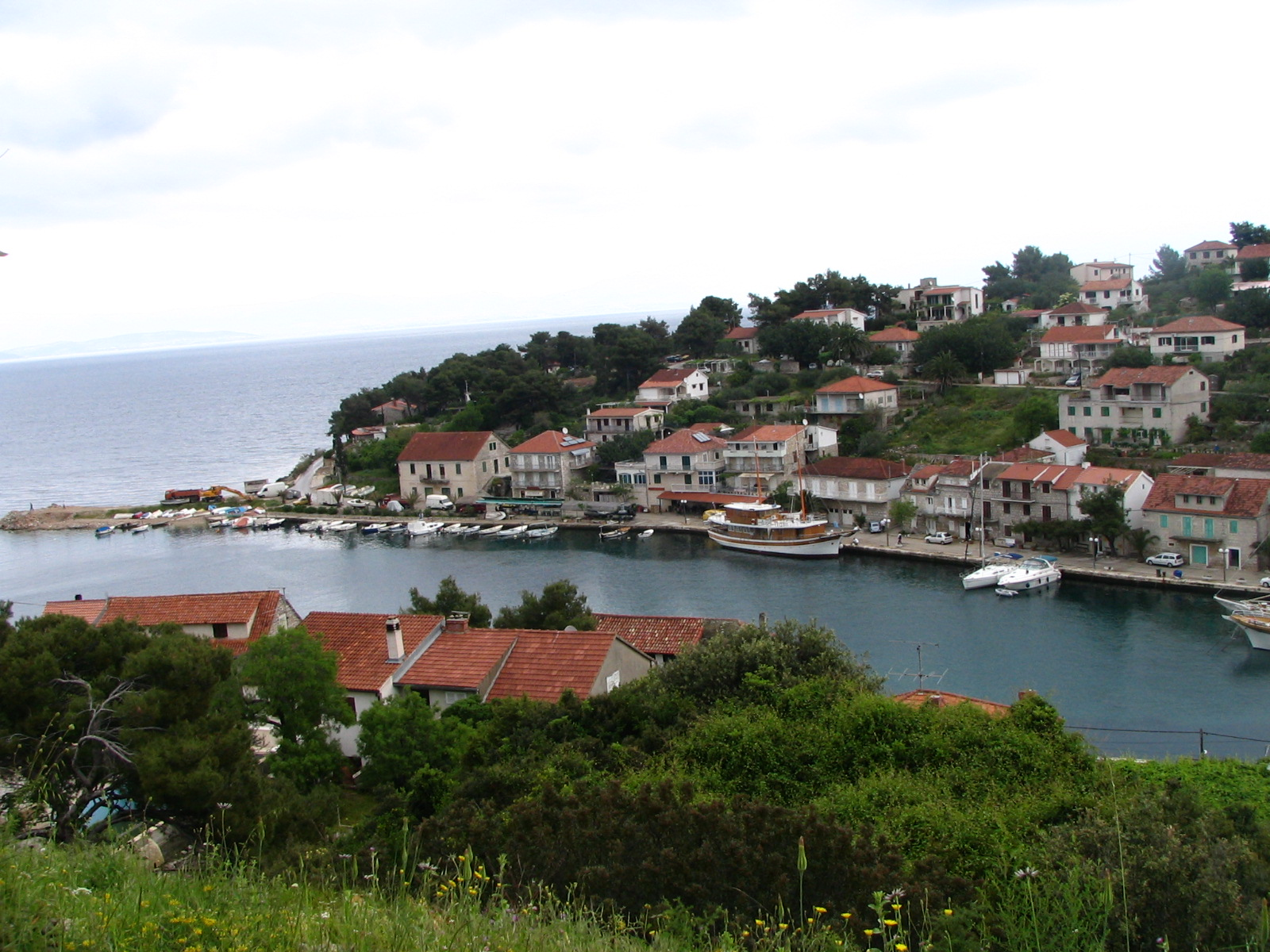
Stomorska, at the eastern terminus the D111 road

D111 is the main state road on the island of Šolta in Croatia. It runs from Maslinica in the west to Stomorska in the east, passing through Grohote, where it connects with the D112 road leading to the Rogač ferry port. Jadrolinija operates ferry services from Rogač to Split on the mainland. The D111 also provides access to Nečujam via road Ž6158 and connects with the D410 state road. The road is 17.8 km (11.1 mi) long. The road, as well as all other state roads in Croatia, is managed and maintained by Hrvatske ceste, a state-owned company.

== Road junctions and populated areas ==
Type	Slip roads/Notes
Settlement	Maslinica — western terminus of the road.
Settlement	Grohote D112 to Rogač and Rogač ferry port – access to the mainland port of Split (by Jadrolinija) and the D410 state road to Split and A1 motorway Dugopolje interchange.
Junction	Ž6158 to Nečujam
Settlement	Gornje Selo
Settlement	Stomorska — eastern terminus of the road.

== See also ==
- Hrvatske ceste
- Jadrolinija
