= Battle of the Dalmatian Channels =

1991 naval battle in the Croatian War of Independence

- Part of the Croatian War of Independence
- A location map of central Dalmatia, and location of the area shown on the map of Croatia (inset, red)
| Date | 14–16 November 1991 |
| Location | Off Split, Adriatic Sea 43°3′25″N 16°51′23″E |
| Result | Croatian victory |

Belligerents
| Croatia | Yugoslavia |

Commanders and leaders
| Sveto Letica | Nikola Ercegović; Ilija Brčič |

Units involved
| Croatian Navy | Yugoslav Navy |

Strength
| Coastal artillery Naval commandos | 2 frigates 6–7 missile boats 2 torpedo boats 4 patrol boats 3 minesweepers |

Casualties and losses
| 2 killed | 22 killed 1 patrol boat captured 2 minesweepers sunk 1 frigate damaged 1 missile boat damaged 1 torpedo boat damaged 1 minesweeper damaged 2 aircraft destroyed |
- 2 civilians killed 9 civilians wounded 2 civilian ferries damaged

The Battle of the Dalmatian Channels was a three-day confrontation between three tactical groups of Yugoslav Navy ships and Croatian coastal artillery supported by a detachment of naval commandos of the Croatian Navy, fought on 14–16 November 1991 during the Croatian War of Independence. On 14 November, the commandos torpedoed the Mirna-class patrol boat PČ-176 Mukos close to the island of Brač in the Split Channel of the Adriatic Sea, prompting a Yugoslav naval bombardment of Brač and Šolta Island the same day. The drifting Mukos was salvaged by Croatian civilian boats and beached at Nečujam bay.

The next day, a group of Yugoslav Navy vessels, organised into the Kaštela tactical group (TG), deployed to the Split Channel, and bombarded the city of Split in retaliation for the loss of Mukos. In return, Croatian coastal artillery engaged the Kaštela TG. To draw off some of the artillery fire, the Yugoslav Navy deployed another group of vessels from the island of Vis, organised as the Vis TG, south of Šolta, where it was engaged by more Croatian artillery. The Kaštela TG retreated east and joined with the Ploče TG, consisting of three minesweepers.

On 16 November, the combined Yugoslav force sailed through the Korčula Channel—a strait separating the islands of Hvar and Korčula—to reach safety at the Yugoslav Navy base at Vis. The warships were then engaged by Croatian coastal artillery deployed on Korčula and the Pelješac Peninsula, losing two minesweepers to the artillery fire in the process.

The battle marked the last deployment of the Yugoslav Navy into one of the Dalmatian channels, the loosening of the naval blockade of the Croatian coast imposed in September, and the largest Croatian Navy operation in the war. The Croatian Navy later towed the grounded Mukos to Šibenik, repaired the vessel and put her into service as OB-62 Šolta. During the battle, 22 Yugoslav Navy crewmen, two Croatian gunners and two civilian sailors in Split were killed. Thirty-three Yugoslav officers were charged in relation to the naval bombardment of Split by Croatian authorities.

== Background ==
In 1990, following the electoral defeat of the government of the Socialist Republic of Croatia, ethnic tensions increased. The Yugoslav People's Army (Jugoslovenska Narodna Armija – JNA) confiscated Croatia's Territorial Defence Forces' (Teritorijalna obrana – TO) weapons to minimize resistance. On 17 August, the tensions escalated into an open revolt by Croatian Serbs, centred on the predominantly Serb-populated areas of the Dalmatian hinterland around Knin, and parts of Lika, Kordun, Banovina, and eastern Croatia. This was followed by two unsuccessful attempts by Serbia, supported by Montenegro and Serbia's provinces of Vojvodina and Kosovo, to obtain the Yugoslav Presidency's approval for a JNA operation to disarm Croatian security forces in January 1991.

After a bloodless skirmish between Serb insurgents and Croatian special police in March, the JNA, supported by Serbia and its allies, asked the federal presidency to give it wartime authorities and to declare a state of emergency. The request was denied on 15 March and the JNA came under the control of Serbian president, Slobodan Milošević. Preferring a campaign to expand Serbia rather than to preserve Yugoslavia, Milošević publicly threatened to replace the JNA with a Serbian army and declared that he no longer recognized the authority of the federal presidency. By the end of March, the conflict had escalated into the Croatian War of Independence. The JNA intervened; they increasingly supported the Croatian Serb insurgents and prevented Croatian police from intervening. In early April, the leaders of the Croatian Serb revolt declared their intention to integrate the area under their control, known as SAO Krajina, with Serbia. The government of Croatia viewed this declaration as an attempt to secede.

In May 1991, the Croatian government responded by forming the Croatian National Guard (Zbor narodne garde – ZNG), but its development was hampered by a United Nations (UN) arms embargo and the Yugoslav Navy's blockade of the Adriatic coast, both of which were introduced in September. Following the Battle of the Barracks, the ZNG acquired a significant stock of weapons and ammunition, including 34 Yugoslav Navy vessels moored in Šibenik. Croatian forces using naval mines deployed in Kaštela Bay rendered the Yugoslav Navy base at Lora in Split inaccessible. On 25 September, the Yugoslav landing barge BRM-86 hit one of the mines and sank while taking supplies from Lora; five Yugoslav servicemen were killed. On 8 October, Croatia declared independence from Yugoslavia, and a month later the Croatian National Guard was renamed the Croatian Army (Hrvatska vojska – HV). Late 1991 saw the fiercest fighting of the war; the 1991 Yugoslav campaign in Croatia culminated in the Siege of Dubrovnik and the Battle of Vukovar.

On the night of 10–11 October, the Croatian torpedo boat TB-51 Vukovar (former TČ-222, captured at Šibenik on 22 September), commanded by Frigate Lieutenant Vojko Marelić, launched an eight-torpedo salvo at the Yugoslav frigate VPBR-31 Split, hiding in the radar shadow of Čiovo island to avoid detection. None of the torpedoes hit home.

During the first days of November, the Yugoslav Navy stopped the Libertas convoy twice for inspection between the islands of Brač and Korčula as it enforced the blockade. The convoy of 40 small boats led by the ferry Slavija was on its way to resupply Dubrovnik and retrieve refugees from the besieged city. On 11 November, the Maltese-flagged coaster Euroriver, crewed by Croatian sailors, was sunk by gunfire off Šolta Island.

== Order of battle ==
Despite the capture of the Yugoslav Navy vessels in September, Croatia's coastal defences relied on captured coastal artillery on the mainland and the nearby islands. In central Dalmatia, these included three batteries on the mainland between Šibenik and Split, 90-millimetre (3.5 in) guns on Žirje Island, a 100-millimetre (3.9 in) battery near Zečevo and 88-millimetre (3.5 in) guns on Smokvica Island near Primošten. Four coastal artillery batteries on islands off Split—the 88-millimetre Marinča Rat on the island of Šolta, the 85-millimetre (3.3 in) Ražanj battery on the island of Brač, and the 88-millimetre battery Ražnjić and the 85-millimetre battery Privala on the island of Korčula—were captured. Some of the guns captured on Žirje and Šolta were removed and used to set up additional coastal artillery batteries at Kašjuni and Duilovo in Split. Additional batteries were set up in Lovište at the tip of the Pelješac Peninsula, and in Blace and Črna Luka on Korčula on the coast north of Smokvica and Vela Luka. The battery deployed to Črna Luka contained 76-millimetre (3.0 in) M1942 (ZiS-3) guns. A naval commando detachment from the Croatian Navy was deployed to the western Brač. The coastal artillery was subordinated to the Croatian Navy and commanded by Admiral Sveto Letica.

The Yugoslav Navy deployed three tactical groups (TGs) named Kaštela, Vis and Ploče off the coast of central Dalmatia from its bases on the islands of Vis and Lastovo. The Kaštela TG was deployed to the sea off Split and north of the islands of Šolta and Brač. It consisted of Koni-class frigate VPBR-31 Split, Končar-class fast attack craft RTOP-401 Rade Končar and RTOP-403 Ramiz Sadiku, Osa-class missile boat RČ-306 Nikola Martinović, Shershen-class torpedo boats TČ-220 Crvena zvezda and TČ-224 Pionir II and two Mirna-class patrol boats, including PČ-176 Mukos. Kaštela TG may have also included an additional Osa-class missile boat. The Ploče TG, deployed to the sea between the mainland and Brač to the east of the Kaštela TG, consisted of three minesweepers: ML-143 Iž, ML-144 Olib and ML-153 Blitvenica. The Vis TG was deployed off the western tip of the island of Hvar. It consisted of a Kotor-class frigate VPBR-34 Pula commanded by Captain Ilija Brčić, one Končar-class fast attack craft, two Osa-missile boats and two Mirna-class patrol craft. The Yugoslav Navy fleet was under overall command of Rear Admiral Nikola Ercegović.

== Timeline ==
=== 14 November ===
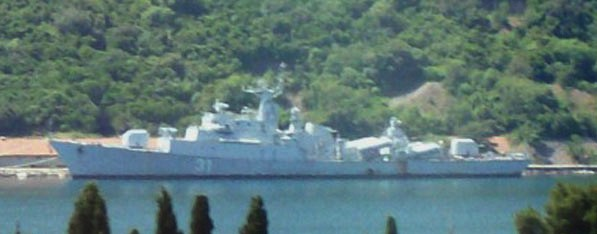
VPBR-31 Split

On 14 November at 5:34 p.m., the Croatian naval commandos attacked Mukos off Brač using a torpedo fired from the island. Her crew reported an explosion in the bow of the ship and requested assistance from the Kaštela TG because she started to sink. The Kaštela TG dispatched Pionir II, which reached Mukos shortly afterwards and had transferred the crew of the damaged vessel by 6:10 p.m. Mukos was left to drift towards Šolta with her bow fully submerged and containing the bodies of three dead crew members. For nearly the entire night, the Kaštela TG directed gunfire against the Milna and Stomorska areas of Šolta to draw fire from Croatian coastal artillery. However, the coastal artillery deployed in the targeted areas did not return fire. Additional Yugoslav vessels sortied from Vis but returned to their base before the morning without transiting the Split Entrance—the strait between the islands of Brač and Šolta. By that time, the naval gunfire also died down. The Ploče TG remained in their assigned area of patrol.

=== 15 November ===
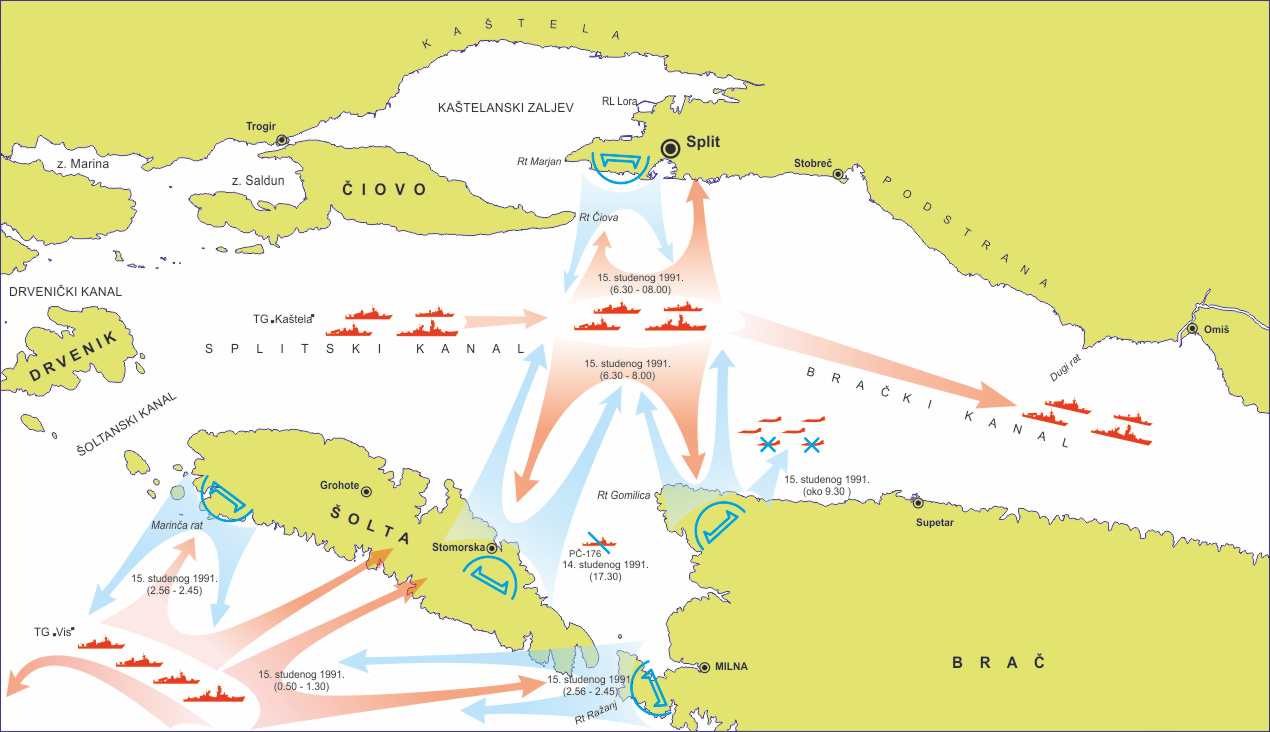
A map of the battle on 15 November (approximate positions)

On 15 November at 6:42 a.m., the Kaštela TG commenced a naval bombardment of targets in Split and on the islands of Brač and Šolta. The order was issued aboard VPBR-31 Split and the JNA Maritime Military Sector command and JNA bases in Split were advised of the attack. The JNA based in Split did not join the bombardment. Letica notified the JNA Maritime Military Sector commanding officer Major General Nikola Mladenić of the attack, but Mladenić said he could not control the situation because his headquarters was denied a supply of electricity. The European Community Monitor Mission (ECMM) was also notified; they promised to make efforts to stop the bombardment. Shortly after, Letica ordered the coastal artillery to commence fire against the Kaštela TG. Besides several near-misses, the coastal artillery fire scored a direct hit against VPBR-31 Split, that was attributed to the Marinča Rat-based battery on Šolta. Croatian sources said Mladenić ordered the bombardment in retribution for the loss of Mukos.

In response to the difficult position of the Yugoslav Navy vessels north of Šolta and Brač, the Vis TG led by Pula sailed north from the island of Vis to draw some of the artillery fire away from the Kaštela TG. As the ships approached the Split Entrance, they made a radar contact sailing away from Split towards open sea at a high speed. Pula, attempting to enforce the blockade imposed in September, requested the vessel by radio to stop for an inspection. The vessel failed to respond and Pula fired several shots in front of it before Brčić noticed that it was a hydrofoil carrying an ECMM team and flying the flag of Europe. He abandoned the pursuit and proceeded to Šolta.

The Vis TG came under fire from the coastal artillery when it arrived within 7 to 8 nautical miles (13 to 15 kilometres; 8.1 to 9.2 miles) of Šolta. In response to the incoming fire, Pula fired her 76-millimetre (3.0 in) bow-mounted gun against targets on Brač and Šolta. Croatian sources said that approximately 800 rounds were fired indiscriminately, striking civilian targets, while Brčić said the TG under his command acted only against artillery located outside residential areas. Pula also fired four salvos of depth charges using her RBU-6000 rocket launcher while the land was outside its range to draw greater attention from the artillery gunners.

The Kaštela TG started to withdraw east at approximately 8:00 a.m., fearing the shortest available route to Vis might be mined in the area of Split Entrance. It reached the eastern tip of Brač by 8:30 a.m. At 9:28 a.m., three Yugoslav Air Force J-21 Jastrebs flew low over Brač and Šolta; minutes later, two were reportedly shot down by anti-aircraft artillery. Six Yugoslav jets were sortied against targets on Brač and Šolta. Following the naval action that morning, Croatian civilian boats from Šolta towed the partially submerged Mukos to Nečujam Bay and ran it aground there. In the afternoon, the Kaštela TG and the Ploče TG linked up east of the island of Hvar.

=== 16 November ===
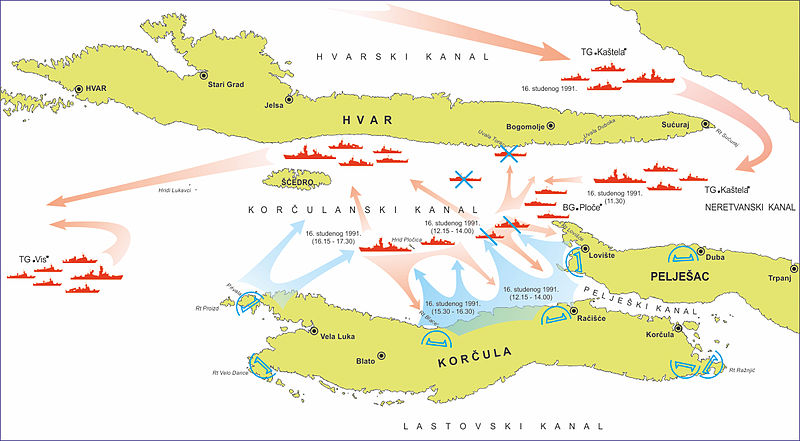
A map of the battle on 16 November (approximate positions)

On 16 November at 11:00 a.m., the Kaštela and Ploče TGs started to assemble at the eastern end of the Korčula Channel, which separates the islands of Hvar and Korčula just north of Cape Lovište at the westernmost tip of the Pelješac Peninsula. The relatively slow minesweepers Iž and Olib, which belonged to the Ploče TG, were hit in the bow and the engine room respectively, by the 76-millimetre (3.0 in) guns at Lovište. To assist the minesweepers, Split turned around to engage the artillery at Cape Lovište while the minesweepers sailed north closer to the Hvar shore in increasingly thick fog. The Croatian guns at Lovište also scored hits on the missile boat RČ-306 and the torpedo boat TČ-224.

At 3:30 p.m., the Kaštela TG turned around once more to attack Cape Lovište, but were engaged by nearby coastal artillery located on Korčula. Blitvenica was damaged in the shooting and the entire naval force moved north-west towards Šćedro Island. Iž sustained heavy damage and ran aground in Torac Bay off Hvar, and was abandoned. Olib sank between Pelješac and Hvar. Her crew were rescued by the remaining vessels in the group. At 7:00 p.m., the fleet sailed south from Šćedro towards the western part of Korčula, seeking shelter as the Sirocco wind strengthened. As the ships approached Korčula, they were fired upon by coastal artillery at Črna Luka and Cape Privala, forcing them to turn west towards Vis. The Vis TG did not engage Croatian positions on 16 November. The coastal guns at Privala reported seven hits on Split.

== Aftermath ==
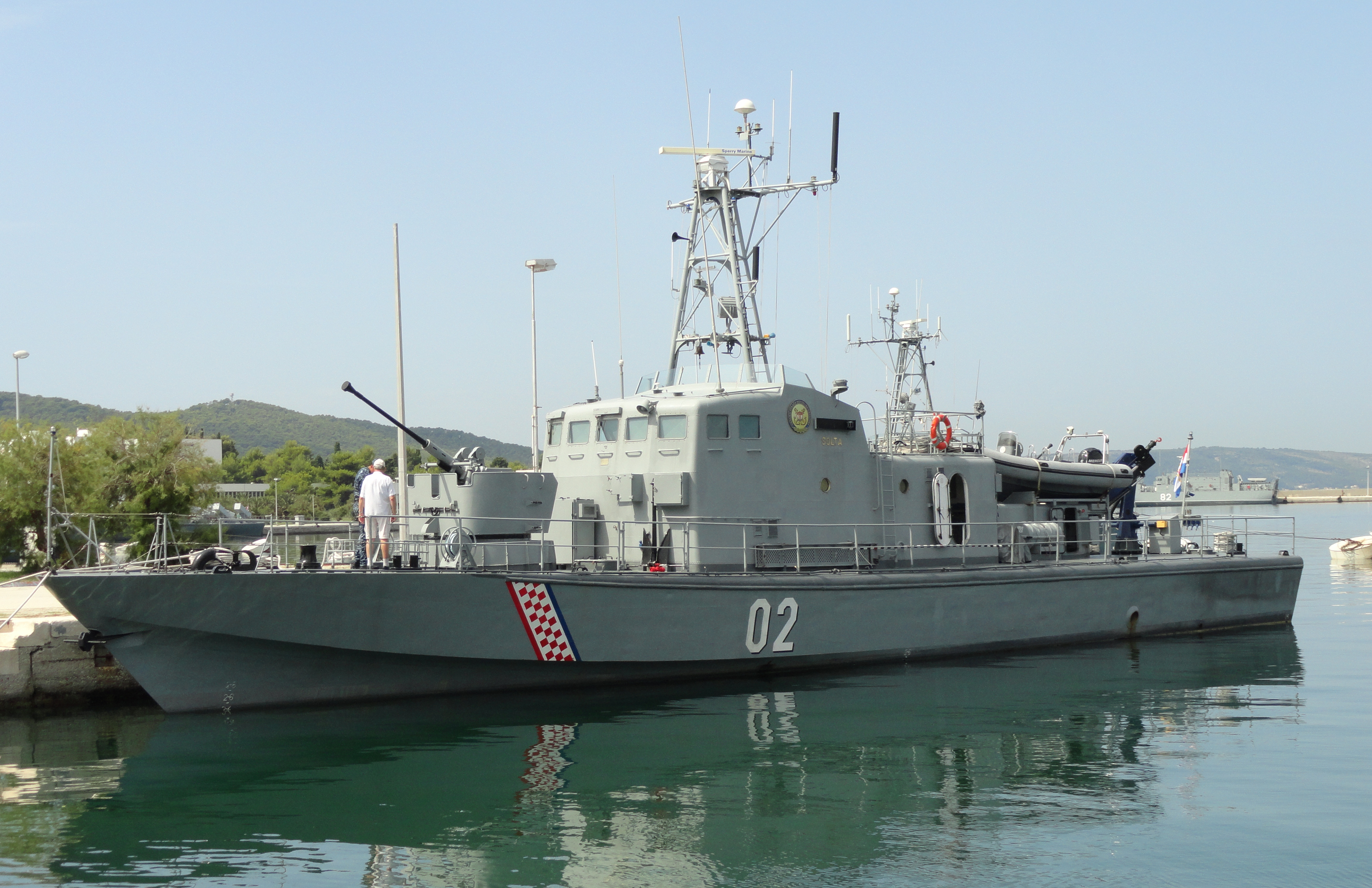
HRM OB-02 Šolta (formerly Mukos)

The Yugoslav Navy was defeated and its ships did not sail north of the Split Entrance again. The battle was the largest engagement of the Croatian Navy during the war. Two Croatian anti-aircraft gunners were killed in action on the island of Brač. According to Mladenić, the Yugoslav Navy lost 22 seamen—including three aboard Mukos—two minesweepers and a patrol craft. The Yugoslav Air Force lost two aircraft but the pilots were rescued by a helicopter that sortied from Vis and picked them up from the sea. Croatian Navy divers later raised Mukos and she was towed to Šibenik by a Brodospas-owned tug. She was repaired and turned over to the Croatian Navy as OB-62 Šolta. Two civilians were killed and nine were wounded in the naval bombardment of Split. The bombardment damaged the Archaeological Museum, Split Municipality Building, Arena Gripe, Public Sanitation Institute, the Technical School, and the ferries Bartol Kašić and Vladimir Nazor, which were moored in the Port of Split. The two civilian fatalities were crew members of Vladimir Nazor.

Croatian authorities charged 33 JNA officers—including Brčić who was tried in absentia and convicted to 15 years in prison—for the bombardment of Split, Šolta and Brač. Brčić, who later became a high-ranking officer of the Montenegrin Navy, was arrested in Naples in late 2007 when he travelled to a NATO function. He was not extradited to Croatia. Most of the other charged officers were also tried in absentia. As of 2013, fifteen officers—including Brčić—were convicted, one was acquitted and seventeen cases were ordered by the Supreme Court of Croatia to be retried because of irregularities during previous trials.

In Croatia, the events of 14 and 15 November 1991 are referred to as the Battle of Split (Bitka za Split) or the Battle of the Split Channel (Boj u Splitskom kanalu), while the events of 16 November are referred to as the Battle of the Korčula Channel (Bitka u Korčulanskom kanalu). The events spanning all three days of the Battle of the Dalmatian Channels are also referred to as the Battle of the Adriatic (Bitka za Jadran).
