= D410 road =

Road in Croatia

D410 state road

Route information
- Length: 4.0 km (2.5 mi)

Major junctions
- From: D8 in Split
- To: Split ferry port

Location
- Country: Croatia
- Counties: Split-Dalmatia
- Major cities: Split

Highway system
- Highways in Croatia

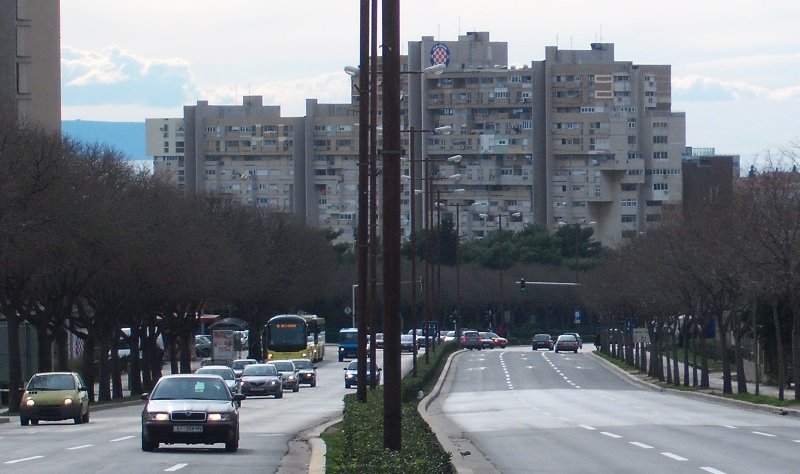
The D410 road in Split (Poljička)

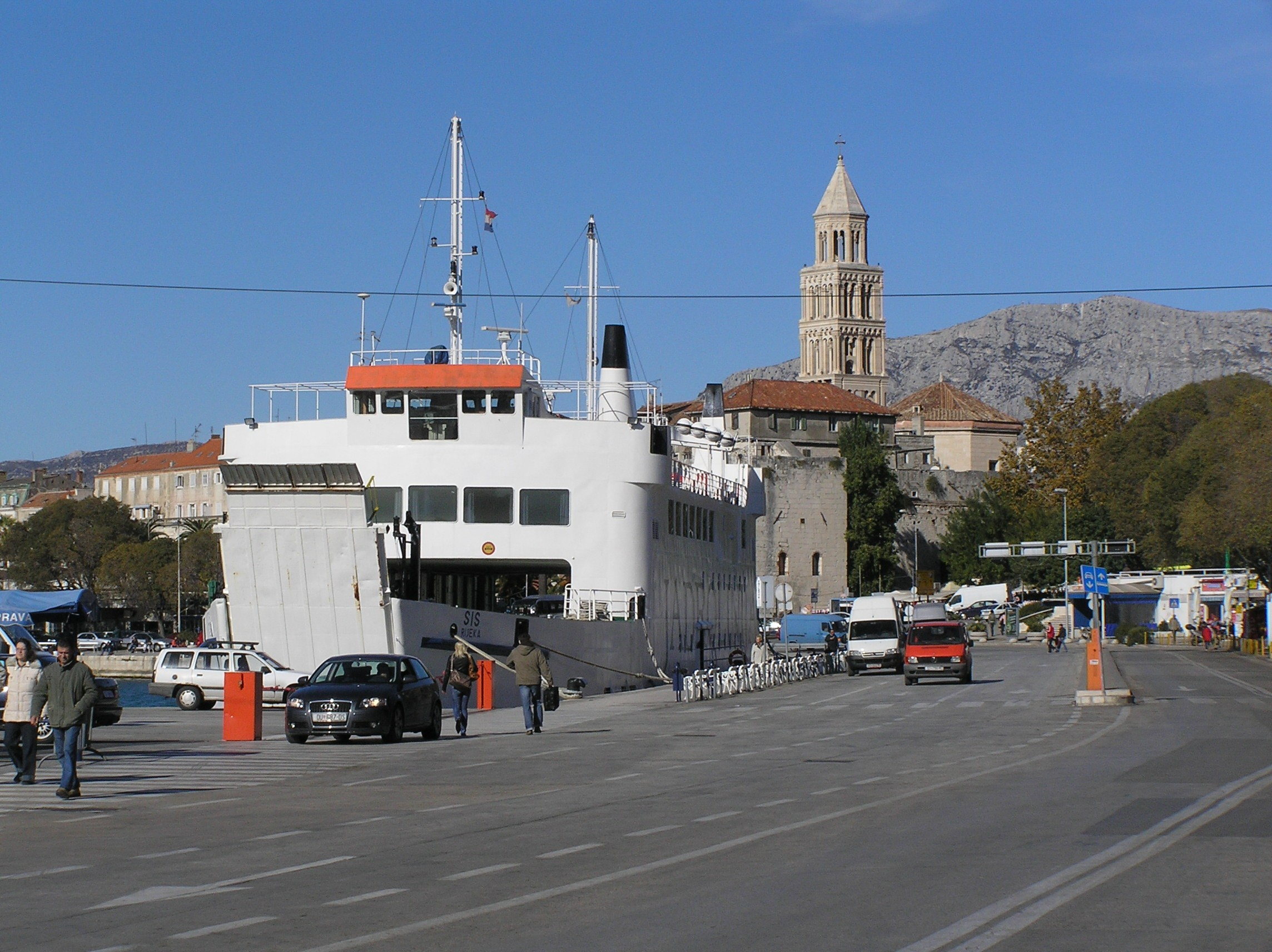
Split ferry port, at the western terminus of the D410 road

D410 branches off to the southwest from D8 in Split towards the Port of Split - ferry access to Supetar (D113), Bol and Milna on Brač Island, Stari Grad (D116) and Jelsa on Hvar Island, Vela Luka on Korčula Island (D118), Rogač on Šolta Island (D112), as well as to Vis (D117), Lastovo (D119), Drvenik Veli and Drvenik Mali islands. There is also an international ferry services to Ancona, Italy. The road is 4.0 km long.

As with all state roads in Croatia, the D410 is managed and maintained by Hrvatske ceste, state owned company.

== Traffic volume ==
D410 traffic is not counted directly, however Hrvatske ceste, operator of the road reports number of vehicles using ferry service flying from the Port of Split, accessed by the D410 road, thereby allowing the D410 traffic volume to be deduced. Furthermore the D410 is a part of Split urban transportation system servicing a considerable urban traffic far exceeding the ferry traffic. Substantial variations between annual (AADT) and summer (ASDT) traffic volumes are attributed to the fact that the road serves as a connection carrying substantial tourist traffic to Split area islands, while the D8 and D1 state roads provide quick access to A1 motorway Dugopolje interchange.

D410 traffic volume
Road	Counting site	AADT	ASDT	Notes
D410	606 Split-Trogir-Drvenik Veli-Drvenik Mali	20	27	Traffic to the islands of Drvenik Veli and Drvenik Mali only.
D410	636 Split-Rogač	148	306	Traffic to the island of Šolta only.
D410	602 Split-Vis	115	280	Traffic to the island of Vis only.
D410	631 Split-Supetar	914	1,989	Traffic to the island of Brač only.
D410	635 Split-Stari Grad	380	932	Traffic to the island of Hvar only.
D410	604 Split-Hvar-Vela Luka-Lastovo	121	278	Traffic to the islands of Hvar, Korčula and Lastovo only.
D410	53 Split-Ancona	49	49*	Traffic to Ancona, Italy only.
D410	Split ferry port (total)	1,747	3,861	Total D410 traffic volume in Split ferry port.
* There are no ASDT figures available for Split-Ancona line. AADT figure is used instead.

== Road junctions and populated areas ==
D410 junctions/populated areas
Type	Slip roads/Notes
	Split; D8 to Šibenik, Zadar and A1 motorway connection road (D1 expressway) (to the north) and Makarska (to the south). The eastern terminus of the road.
	Split ferry port - ferry access to Supetar (D113), Bol and Milna on Brač Island, Stari Grad (D116) and Jelsa on Hvar Island, Vela Luka on Korčula Island (D118), Rogač on Šolta Island (D112), as well as to Vis (D117), Lastovo (D119), Drvenik Veli and Drvenik Mali islands. There is also an international ferry services to Ancona, Italy. The western terminus of the road.
