= Maslinica =

- Village
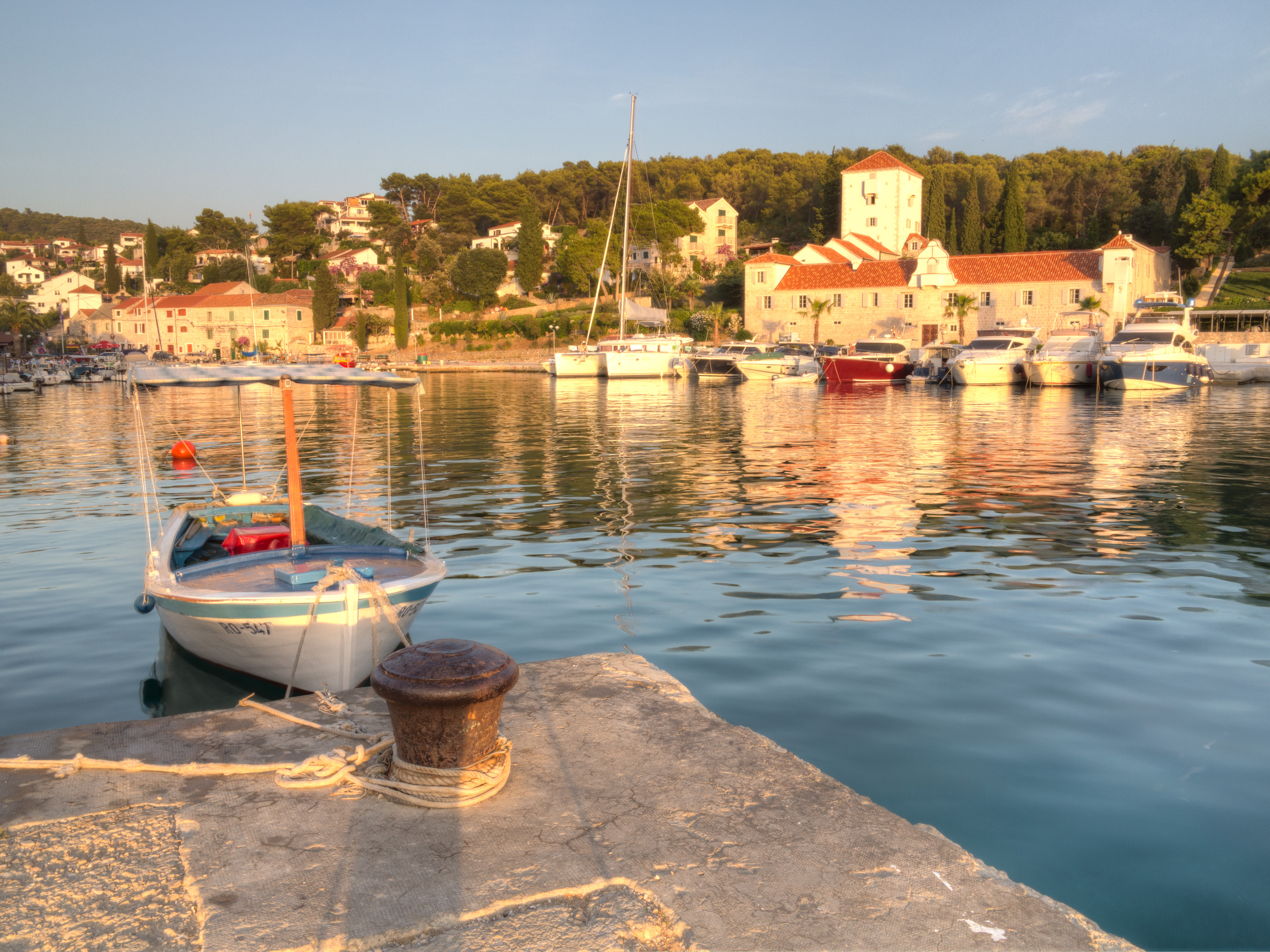

- Location within Split-Dalmatia County Location within Croatia
- Coordinates: 43°23′56″N 16°12′29″E
- Country: Croatia
- Municipality: Šolta

Area
  - Total: 2.7 km^{2} (1.0 sq mi)

Population (2021)
  - Total: 242
  - Density: 90/km^{2} (230/sq mi)
- Time zone: UTC+1 (CET)
  - Summer (DST): UTC+2 (CEST)

Maslinica is a port village on the island of Šolta in Croatia in the Split-Dalmatia County. It is connected by the D111 highway. Maslinica has 208 inhabitants. The center of the village, the westernmost town of the island, the castle Martinis Marchi, now a luxury hotel with marina for about 60 boats.

During the time of the Austro-Hungarian Empire the villages of Šolta still have their Italian names as well as Porto Olivetto.

In the 19th century the best wine of the island came from Maslinica. The best qualities of national importance were created in the 1870s and 80s by Pietro degli Alberti from Porto Oliveto di Solta. At the Vienna World Fair in 1873 he received an honorary prize. At the Triester exhibition in 1882 he received a gold medal.

== Image gallery ==
Maslinica

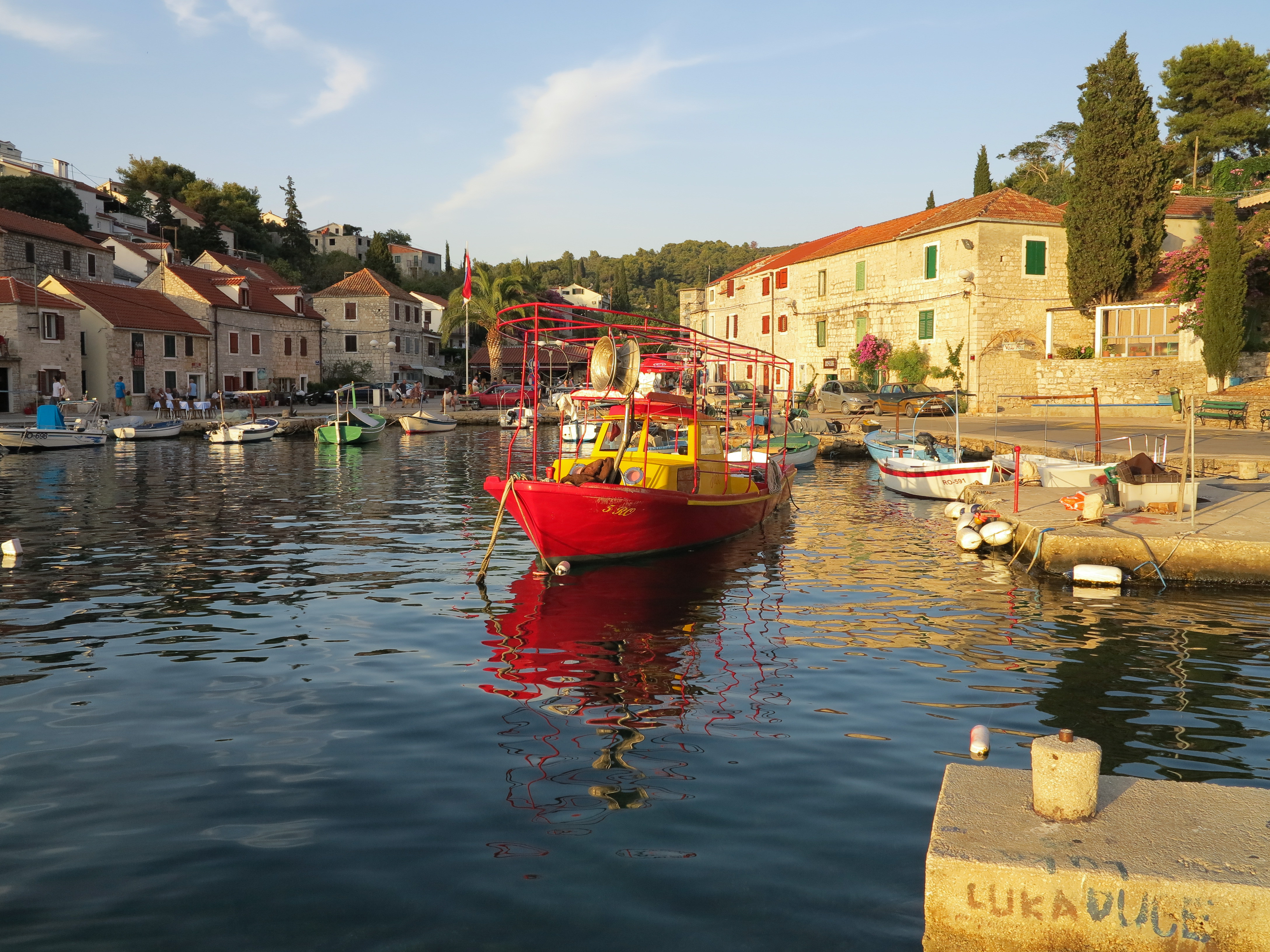
Southern bay

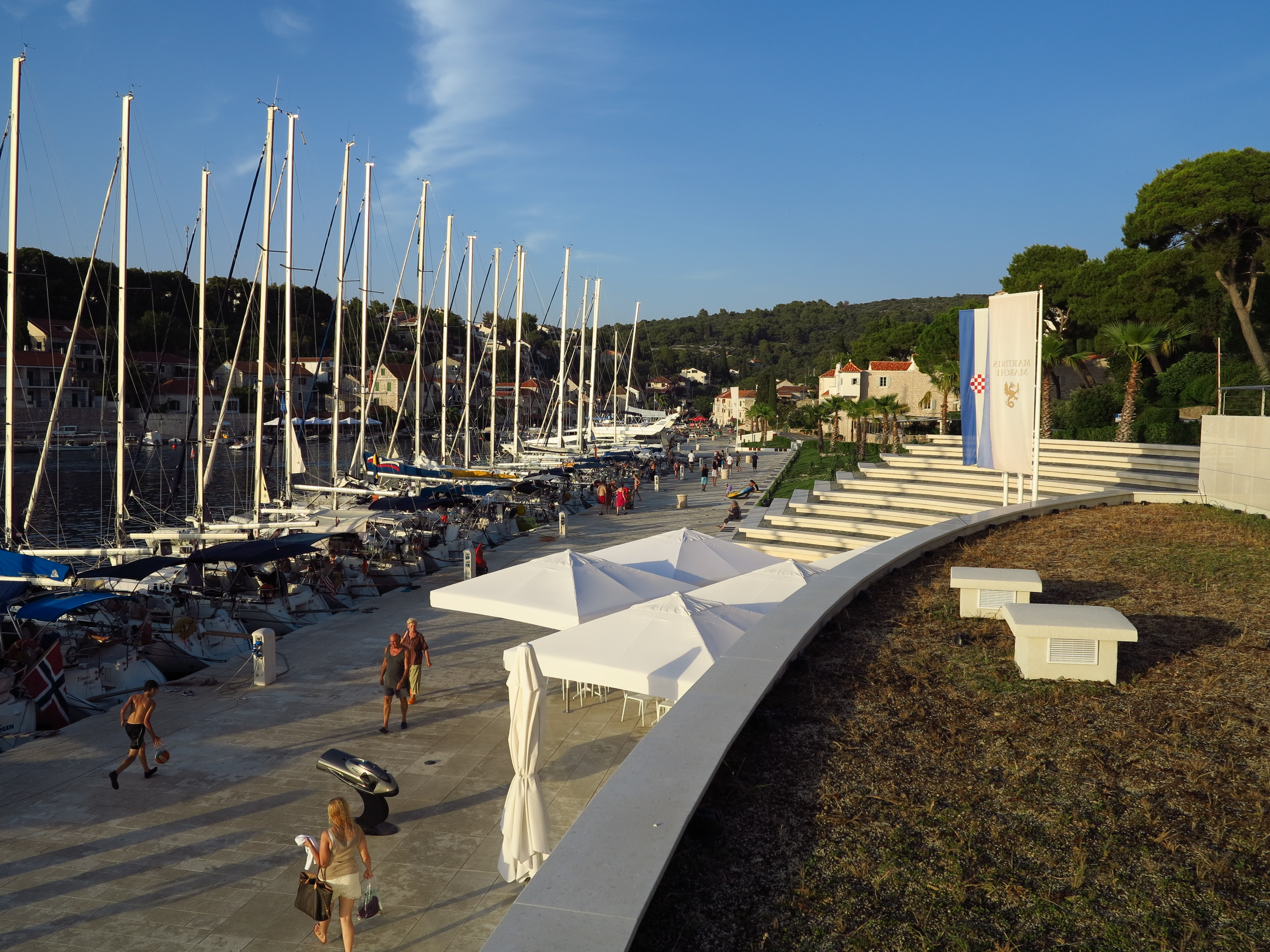
New Marina from 2012

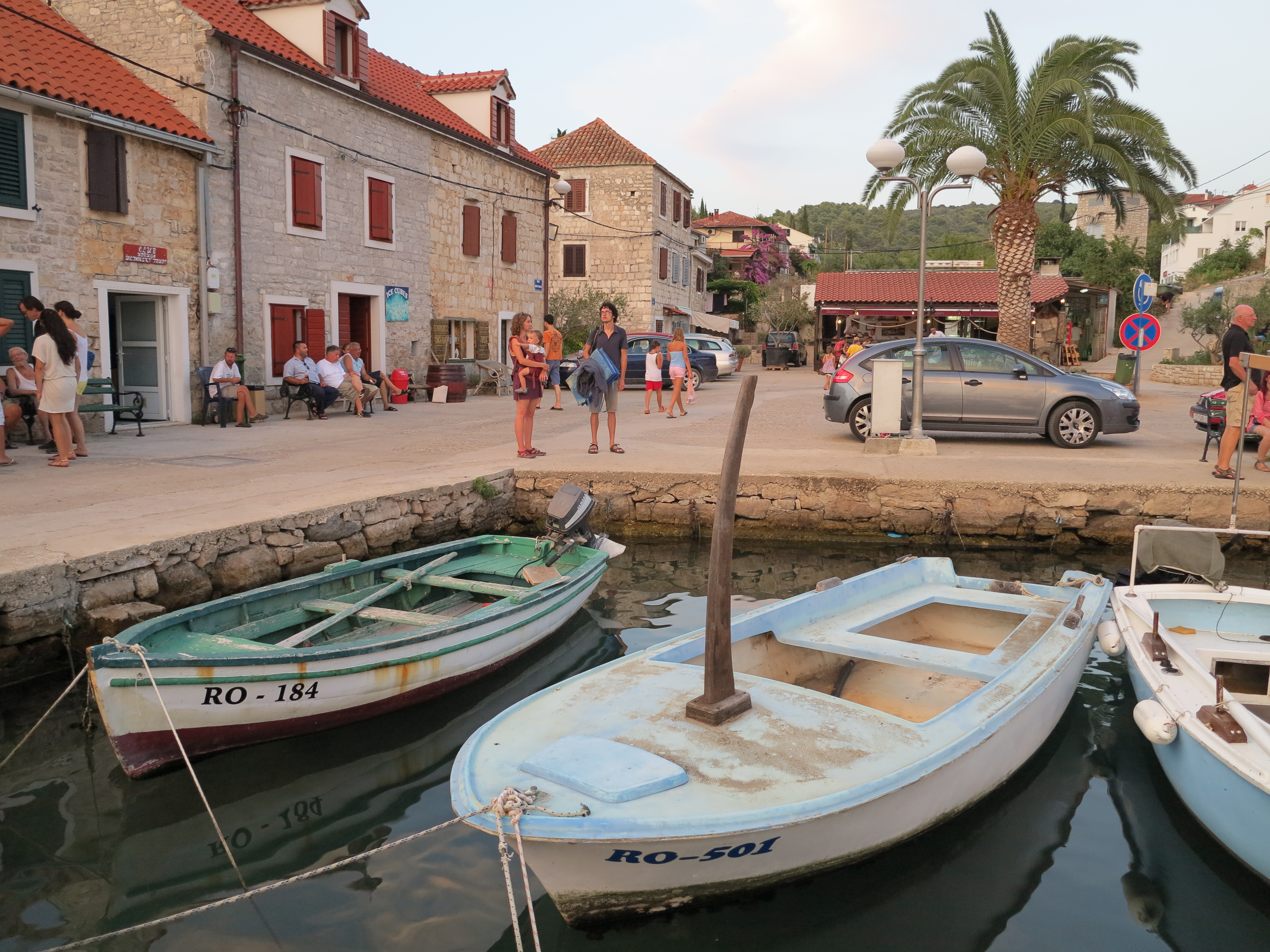
Inner bay

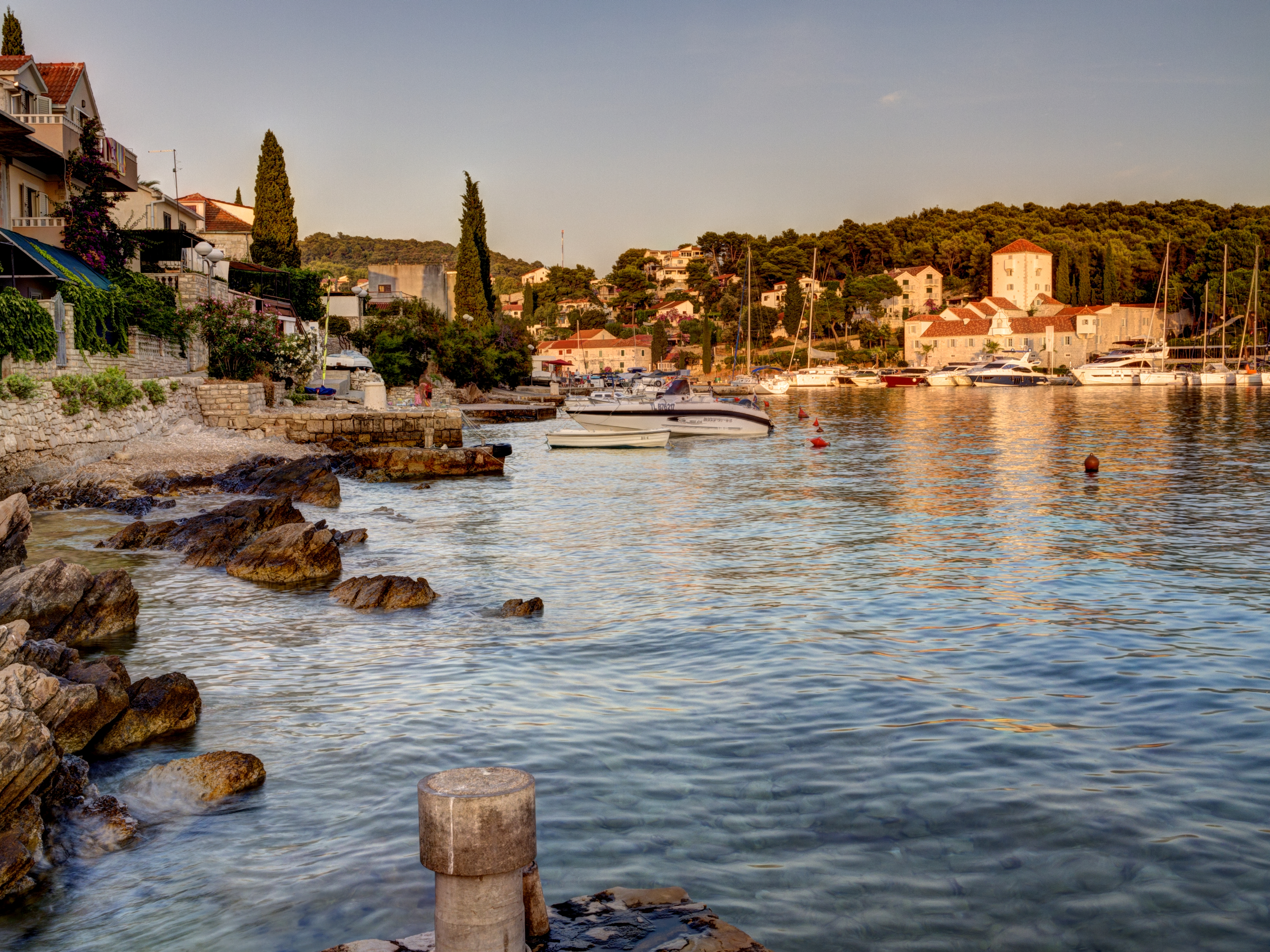
Northern bay
