= Rogač =

Coordinates: 43°24′N 16°18′E

- Village
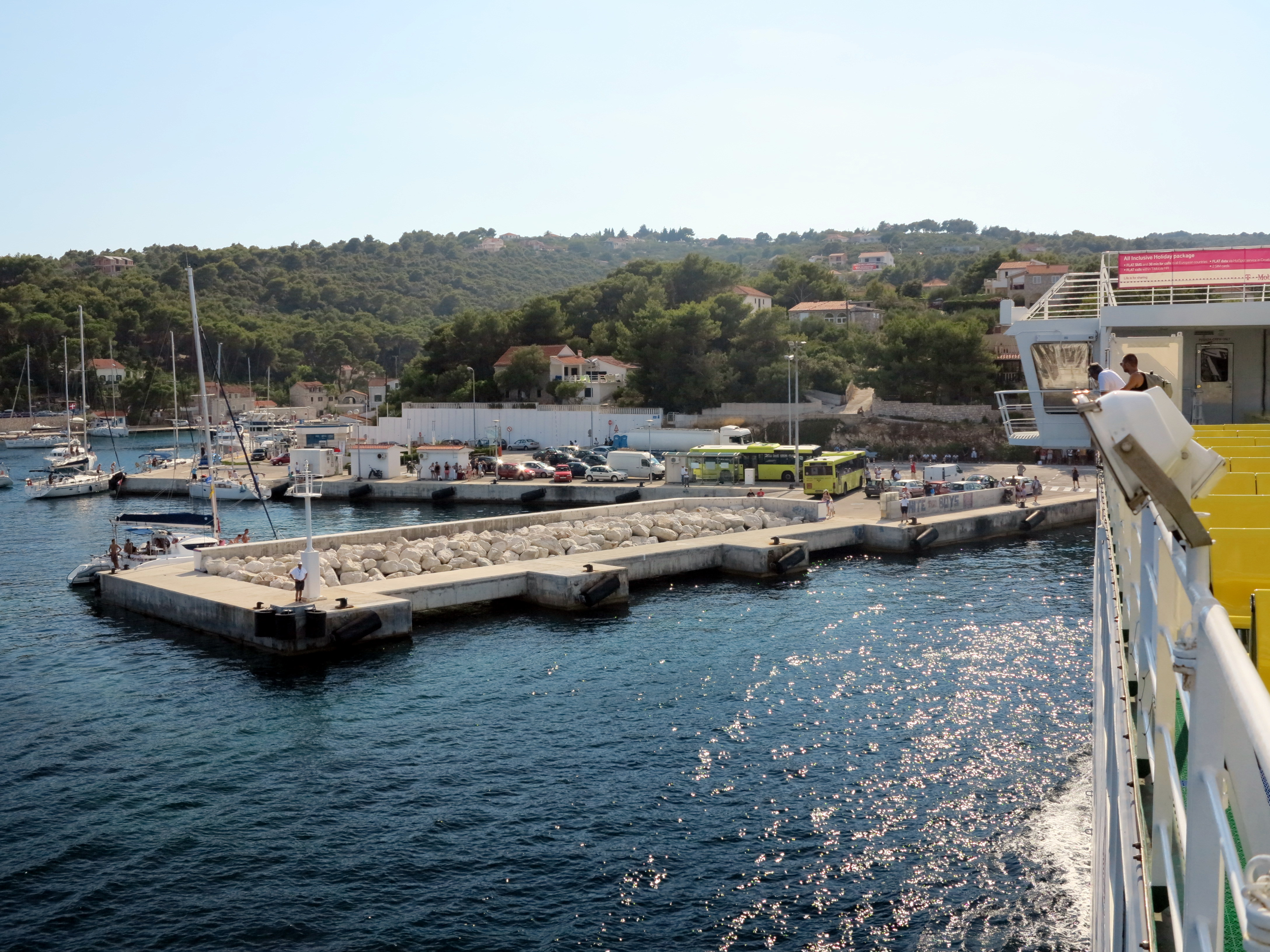
- Interactive map of Rogač
- Country: Croatia

Area
  - Total: 0.35 sq mi (0.9 km^{2})

Population (2021)
  - Total: 134
  - Density: 390/sq mi (150/km^{2})
- Time zone: UTC+1 (CET)
  - Summer (DST): UTC+2 (CEST)

Rogač is a port village in Croatia on the northern coast of Šolta island in the Split-Dalmatia County. It is connected by the D112 highway and by ferry. In the small port with the Port Authority of the island, there is a filling station for cars and boats. Also land in Rogač car ferries. The place belongs to Grohote and has 110 inhabitants.
