= Nečujam =

Coordinates: 43°23′N 16°20′E

- Village
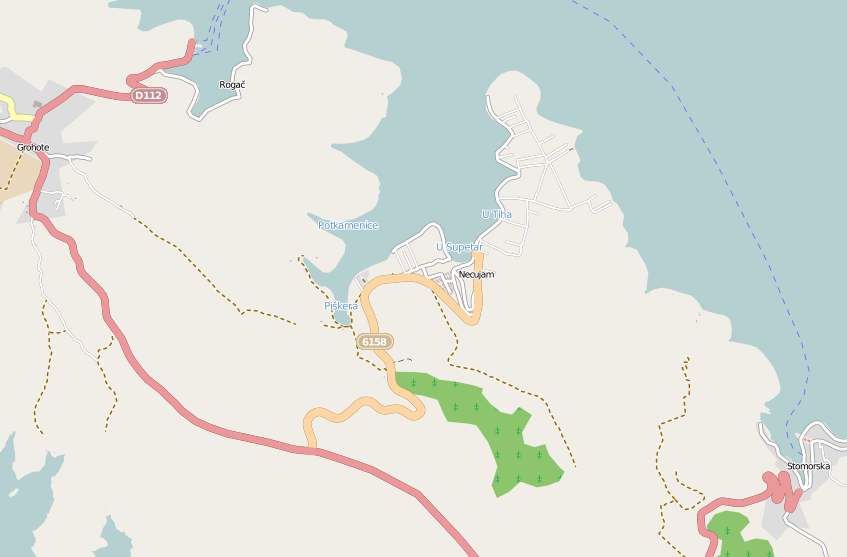
- Country: Croatia
- County: Split-Dalmatia County
- Municipality: Šolta

Area
  - Total: 6.9 km^{2} (2.7 sq mi)

Population (2021)
  - Total: 286
  - Density: 41/km^{2} (110/sq mi)
- Time zone: UTC+1 (CET)
  - Summer (DST): UTC+2 (CEST)

Nečujam is a bay and village on the island of Šolta in Croatia in the Split-Dalmatia County. It is connected by the D111 highway. Nečujam has 171 inhabitants.

== Image gallery ==
Nečujam

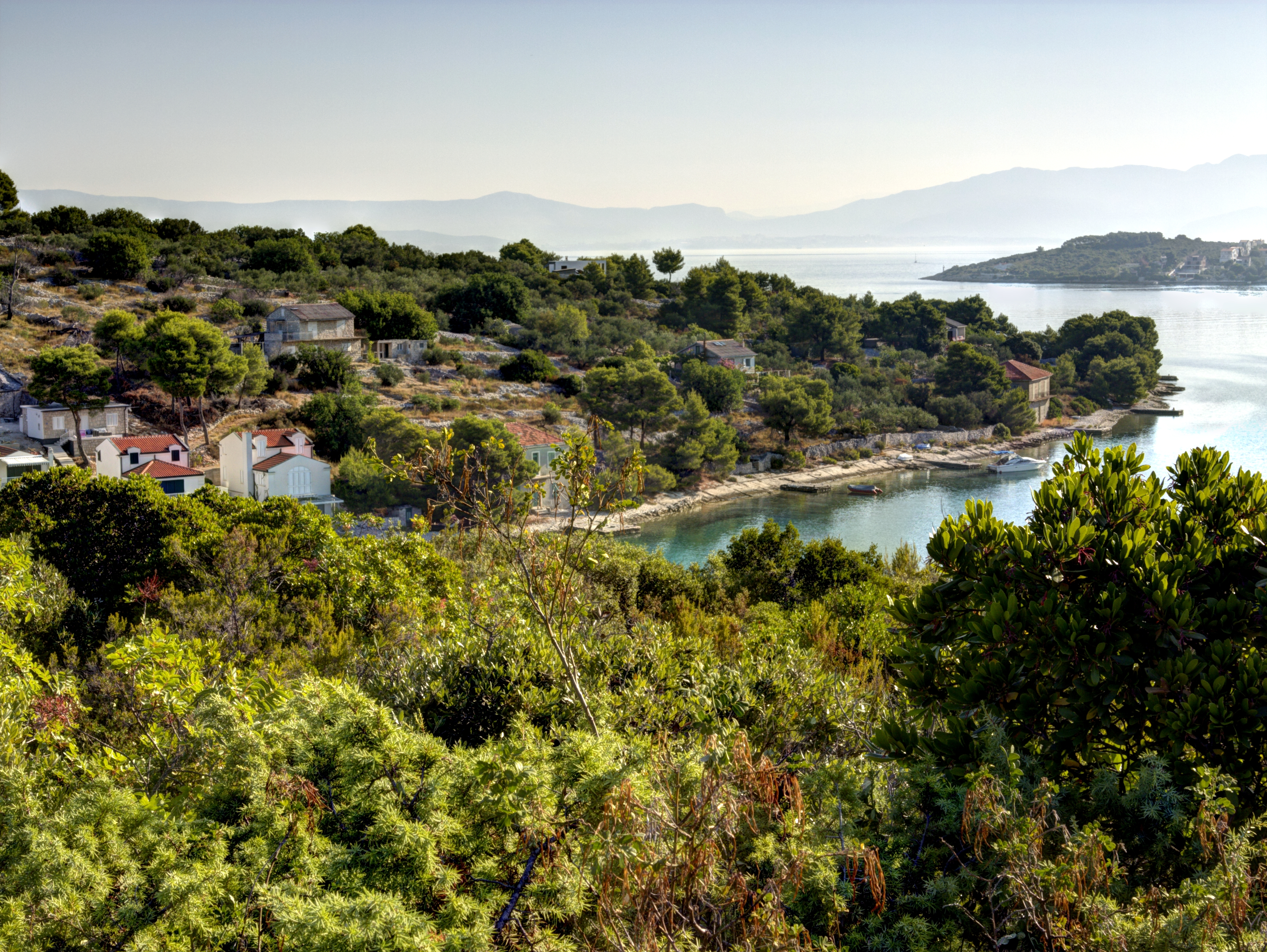
Podkamenica bay

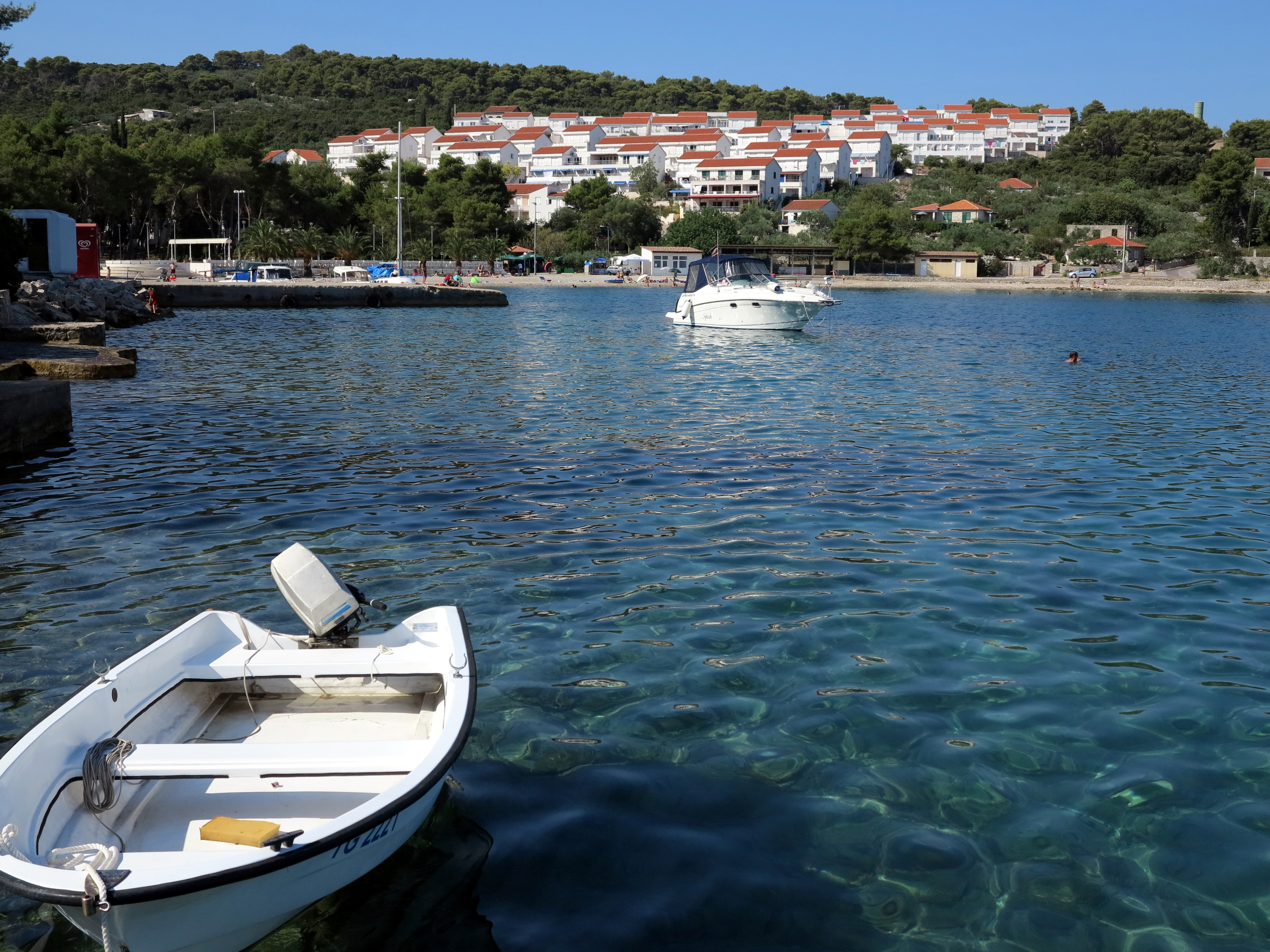
Supetar bay

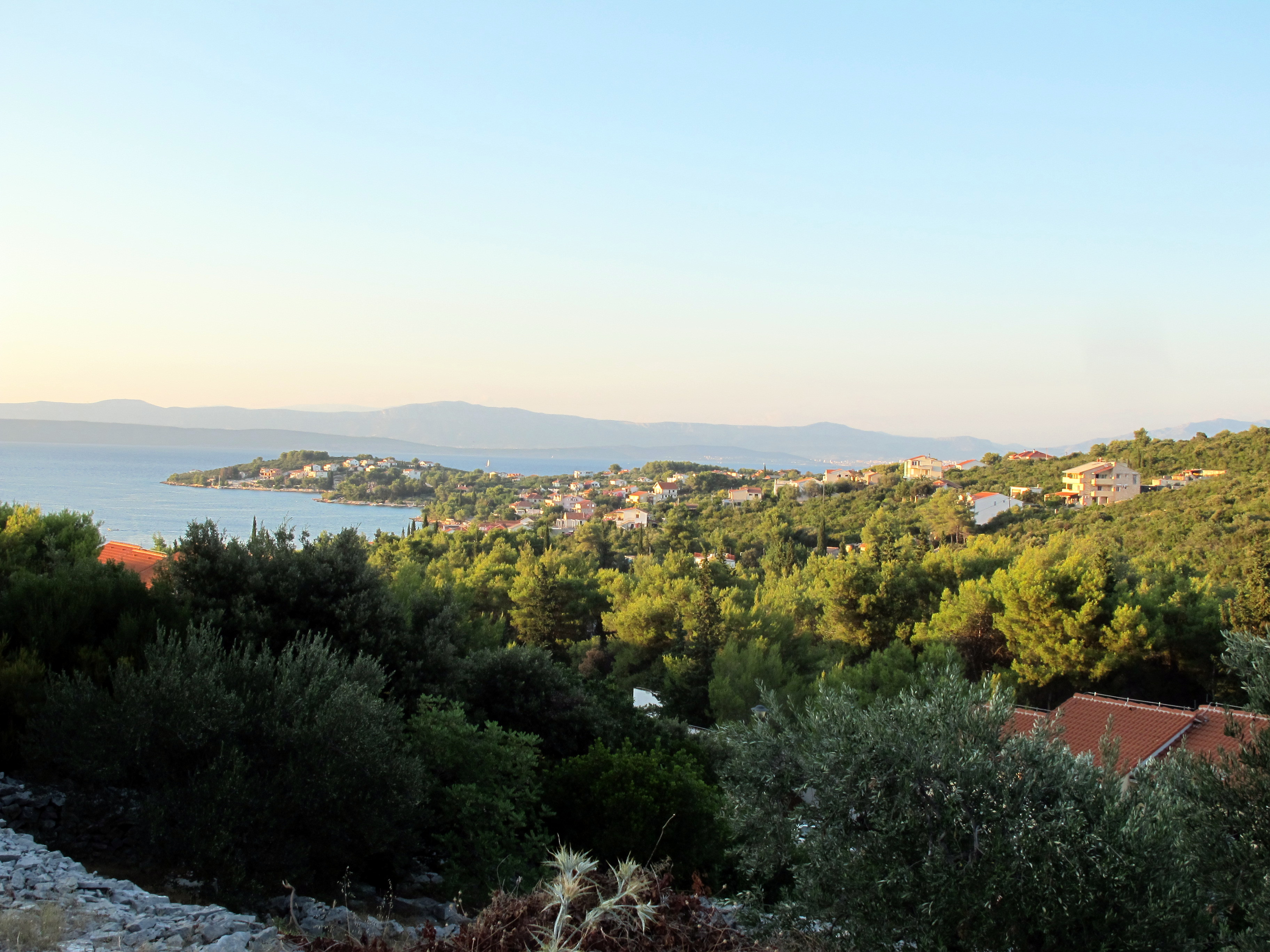
Seaview

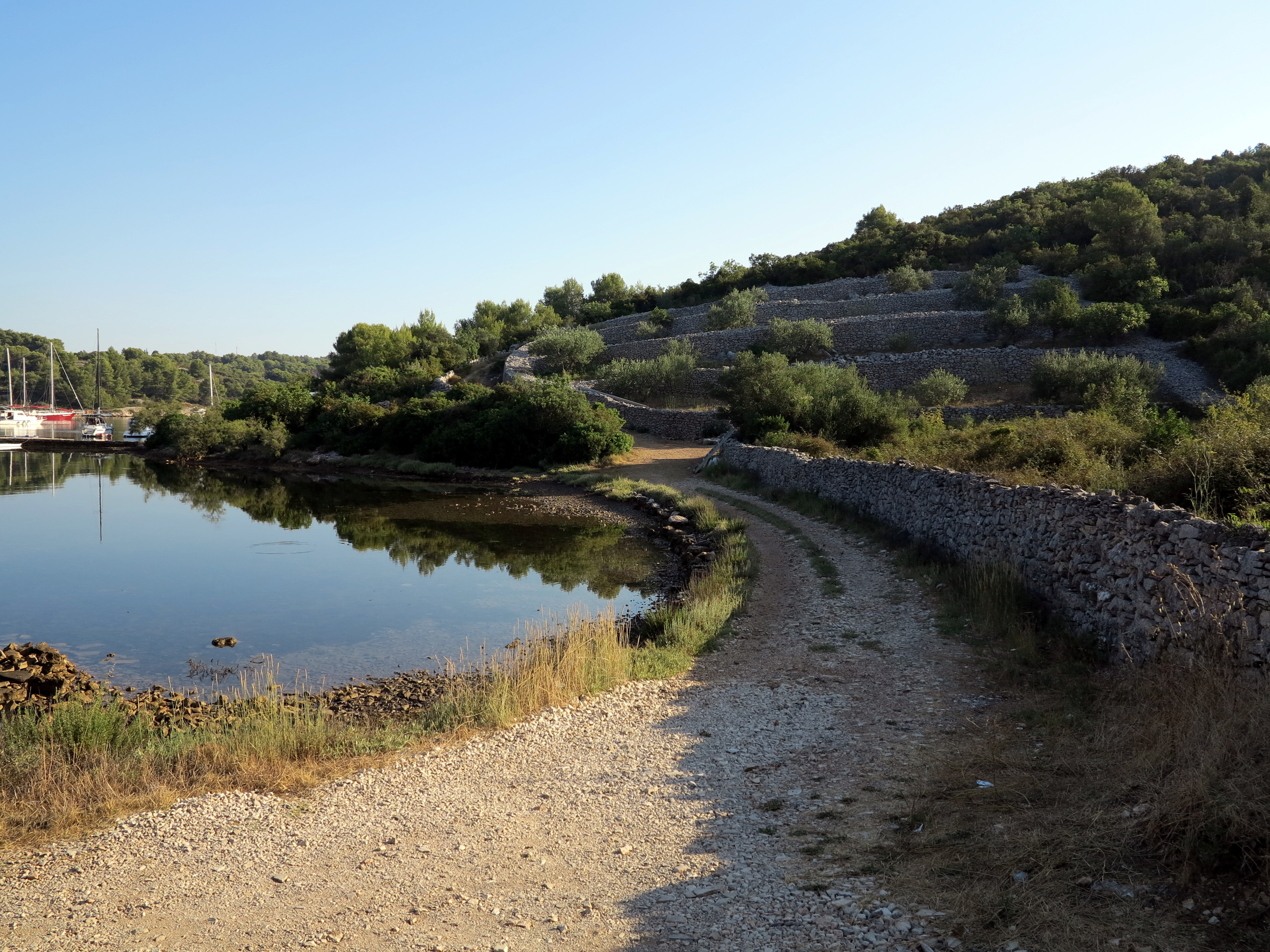
Piškera
