= Grohote =

Coordinates: 43°23′N 16°17′E

- Village
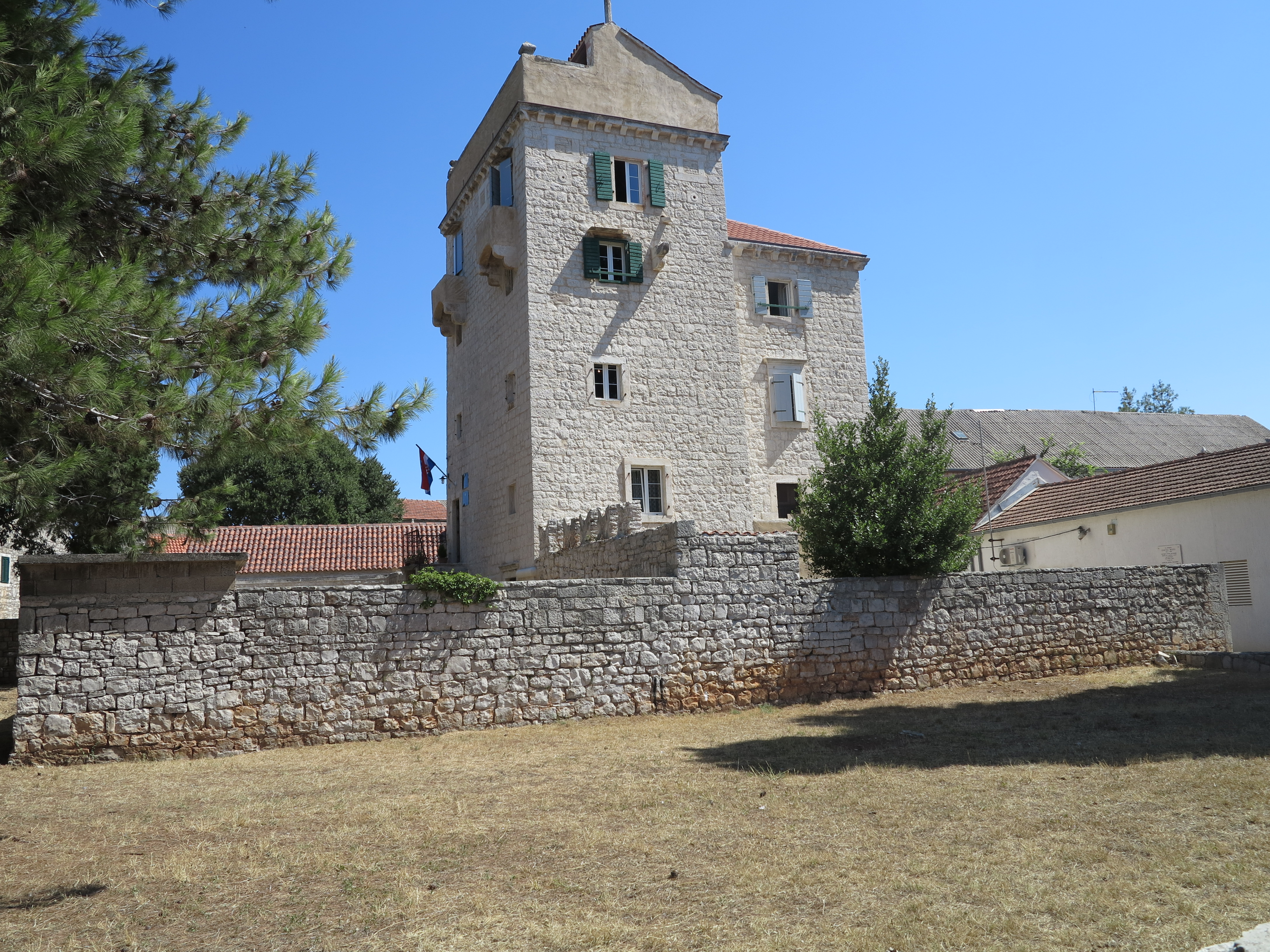
- Town Hall, a limestone tower, in Grohote on the island
- Interactive map of Grohote
- Country: Croatia

Area
  - Total: 4.5 sq mi (11.7 km^{2})

Population (2021)
  - Total: 440
  - Density: 97/sq mi (38/km^{2})
- Time zone: UTC+1 (CET)
  - Summer (DST): UTC+2 (CEST)

Grohote is a village in Croatia on the island of Šolta. It is connected by the D111 highway. Grohote is the oldest and largest village of the island. It is the economic center of Šolta. It is the seat of the administration and school location. There is a farmers market, two supermarkets, a pharmacy, post office, a permanently staffed fire station and an island hospital doctor and helicopter landing pad.

== History ==
During the time of the Austro-Hungarian Empire the villages of Šolta still have their Italian names also Villa Grohote. In 1867, the vicar Michael Vuskovič von Grohote received from the Austrian emperor Franz Joseph I of Austria the Order "Goldene Verdienstkreuz mit der Krone" (Golden Cross of Merit with the Crown). This was a tribute to his many years of service in the field of church and popular education and his charitable work.

The Telegraph arrived late at Šolta. In 1874, the k.k. State telegraph station Grohote handed over to the operation at "limited daily services". That was at the same time as in other smaller places of the monarchy as for example in the Carinthian Sankt Paul im Lavanttal or in Pontafel Pontafel.

=== Stone Buildings ===
In the past people from Grohote used to build their homes mostly by using stone, the material from their natural environment. The skills of materfull stone processing, learned over centuries, has been adapted to various construction purposes. Islanders have built stone walls around fields, vineyards, roads and olive fields, as well as field shelters, storage huts and farm sheds. Stone, as the principle building material, was also used to build private houses, public buildings and religious objects. Many of the people on the island built using their dry stone method (joining stone without any adhesive material, called suhozid), while other village-stonemasons were building used the uživo technique, masterfully joining stone with mortar. All of the buildings were adapted to the needs of everyday life, especially to agriculture since it was the prevailing economic activity on the island.

Only a small number of family houses are single-storey buildings. The walls built using the uživo method were decorated by chiseled door-posts and window frames; the window shutters (škure) were made of wood. Gable roofs, with a mild slope, were covered with chiseled limestone boards (škrilje), and only recently have cylindrical roof tiles been introduced. Protruding roof windows (luminariji), like the chimney (fumar) with a variety of crownings, contributed to the picturesqueness. On the ground floor there was the wine cellar (konoba) in which wine, oil and other goods were stored. In some of the wine cellars there was also a hand mill (žrna) for the everyday grounding of grain. Access to the upper floors was through an external stone staircase (skale), which led to a wide-stone paved terrace in front of the door (balatura), which was laid on the vaulted ceiling (volat). In the 19th century the wealthy households had water tanks for collecting rainwater, which also served as terraces (balatura), and on them was placed the stone top of the well (grlo gustirne), which was also chiseled.

The kitchen (kužina) was on the first floor in the majority of houses, but in some it was in a separate single-storey building adjacent to house. The central place of any home was the open hearth (komin), which sat along the rear wall of the kitchen. The smoke from the open hearth was directed towards the fireplace hood (napa) where, on the transversal beam; there was an attached chain (komoštra) with a hook to suspend pots while preparing food. People sat on the benches, located at the sidewalls of the hearth for all of the family gatherings. The rooms were scantly furnished with plain beds and wooden chest boxes (škrinje) for clothes and bed linen. In the paved courtyard there were usually other smaller buildings necessary for life on the farm as well as the olive press (toć). The courtyard was encircled by a high fence with a wooden door over which there was a stone arch.

== Image gallery ==
Grohote

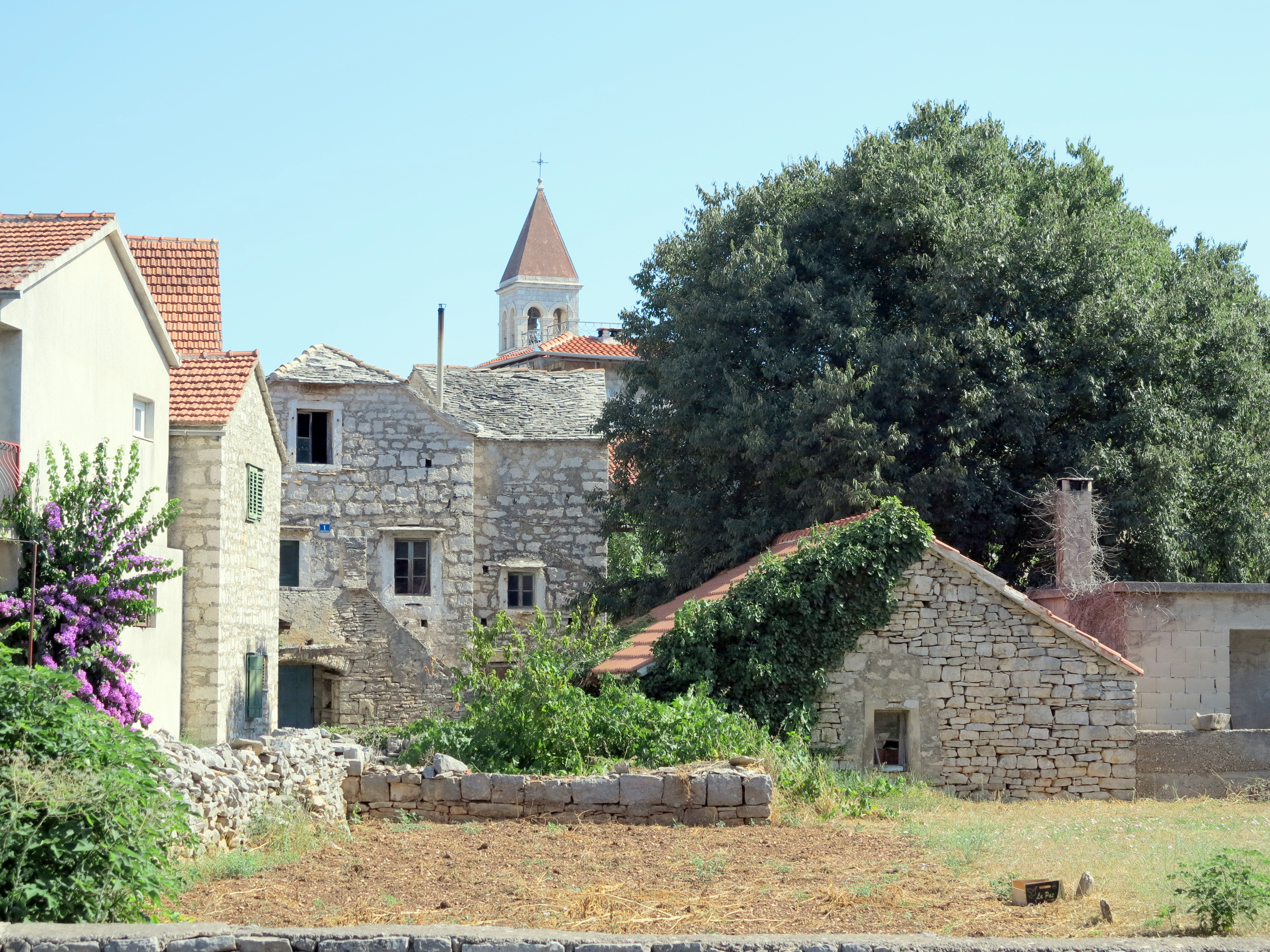
Old farmhouses

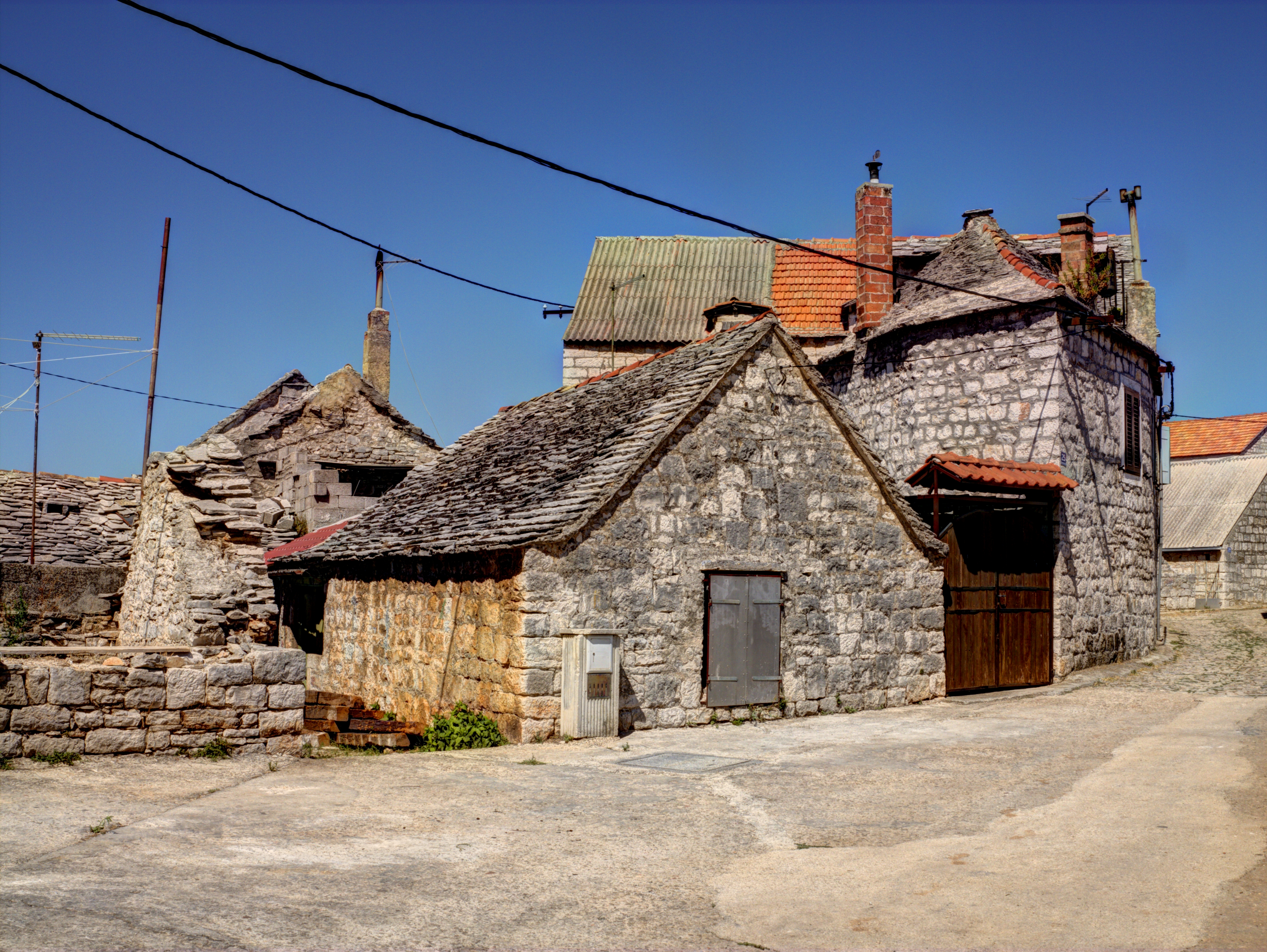
Roofs of houses made of stone

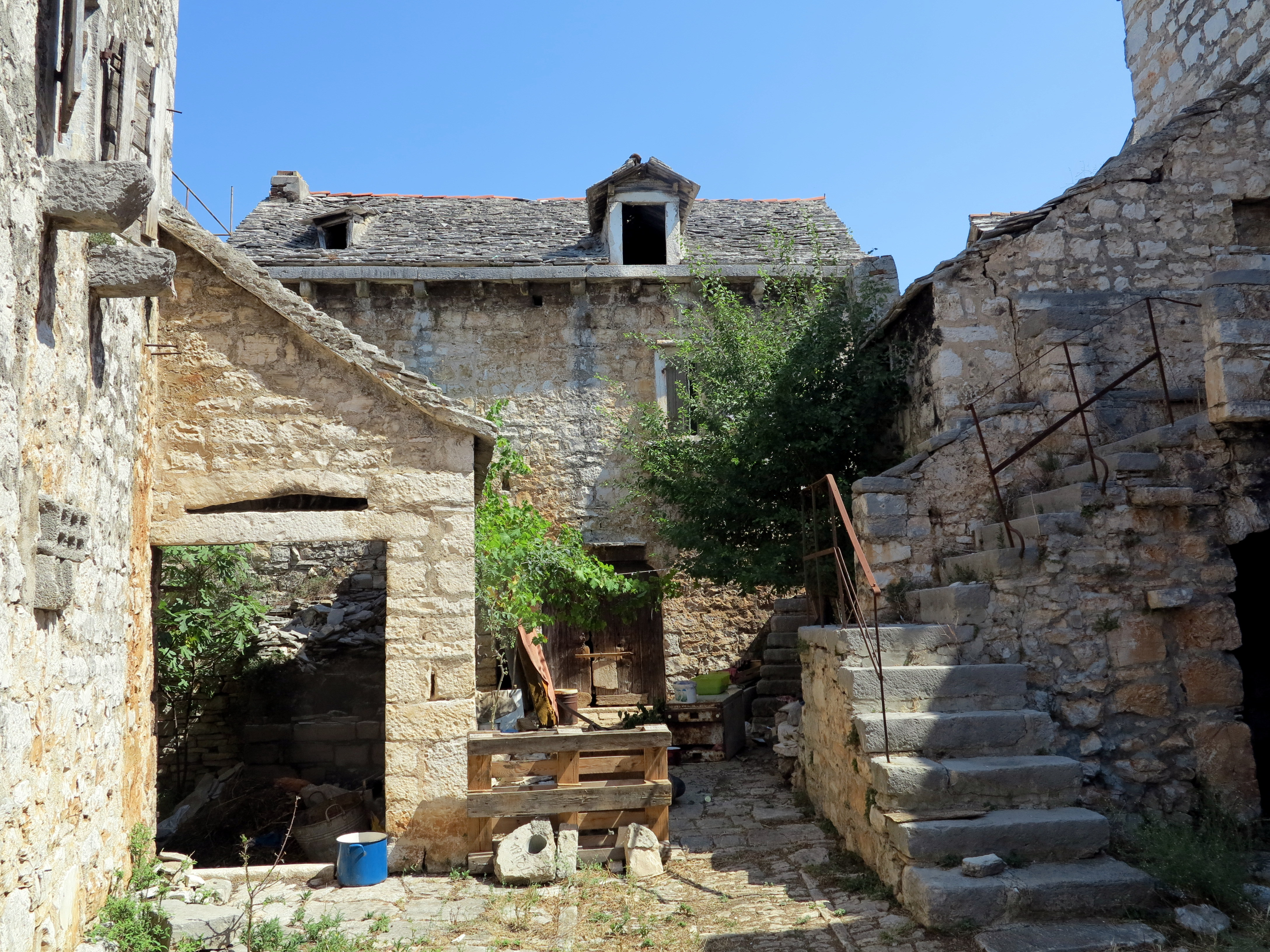
Stone stairs

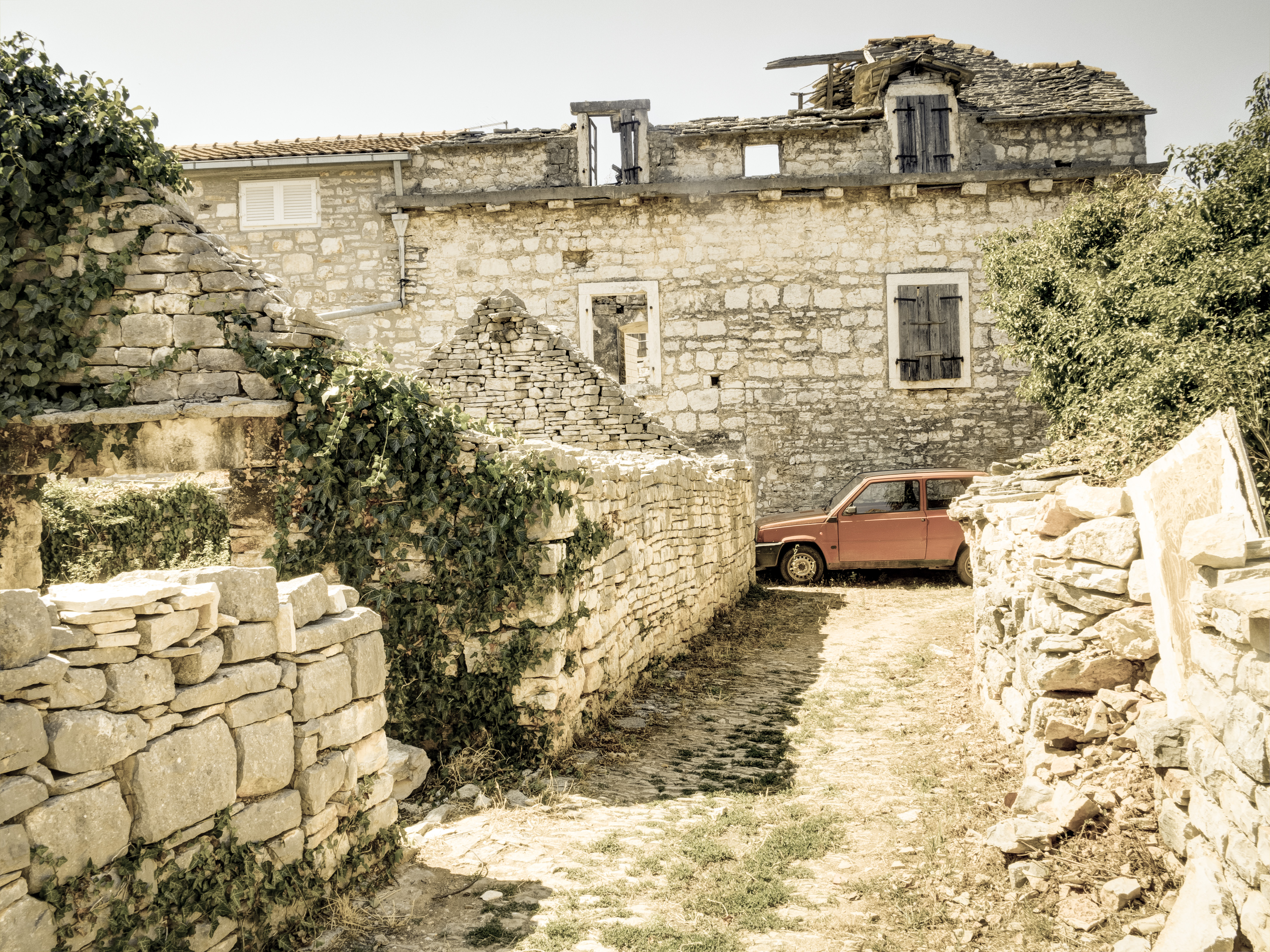
Dilapidated houses

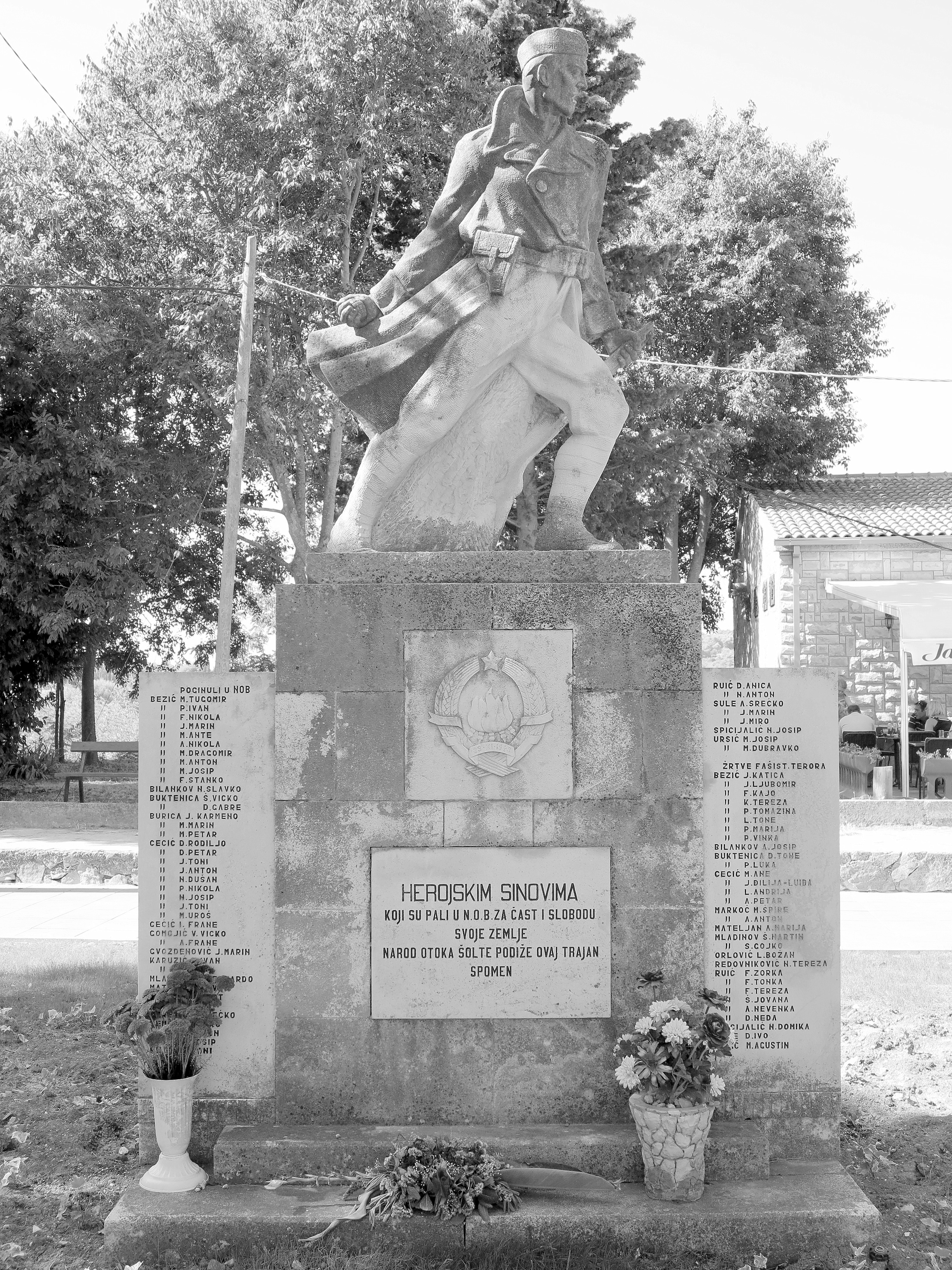
World War II Yugoslav Partisans Memorial
