= Stomorska =

- Village
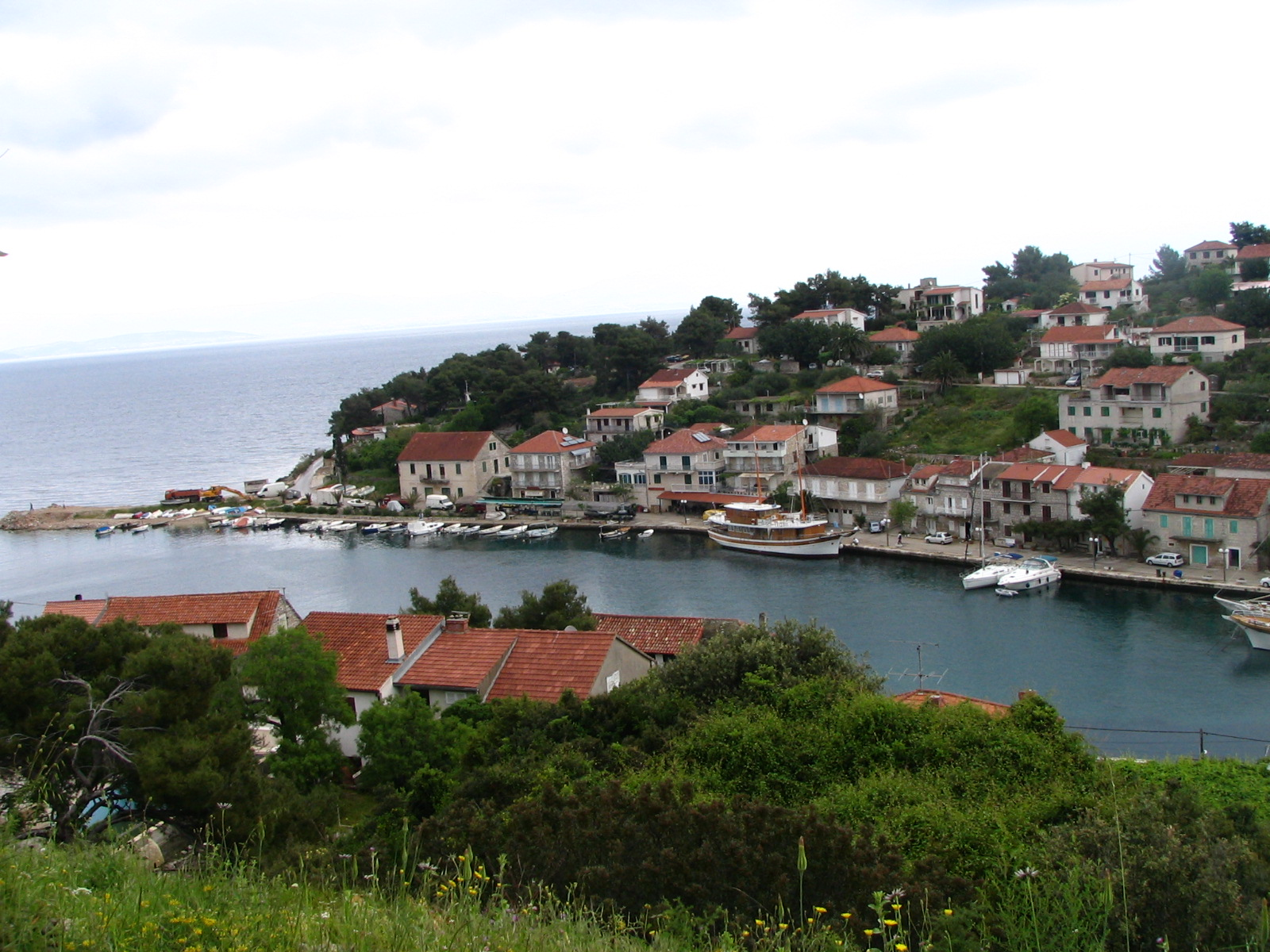
- Interactive map of Stomorska
- Coordinates: 43°22′14″N 16°21′16″E
- Country: Croatia
- County: Split-Dalmatia County
- Municipality: Šolta

Area
  - Total: 3.1 km^{2} (1.2 sq mi)

Population (2021)
  - Total: 319
  - Density: 100/km^{2} (270/sq mi)
- Time zone: UTC+1 (CET)
  - Summer (DST): UTC+2 (CEST)

Stomorska is a village and a cadastral in Croatia, on the northern coast of Šolta island in the Split-Dalmatia County. It is connected by the D111 highway. Stomorska is the oldest town on the island on the water. The place is well connected and has a gastronomic marina.

During the time of the Austro-Hungarian Empire the villages of Šolta still have their Italian names as well as Stomosca.
