= Drvenik Mali =

Island of Croatia

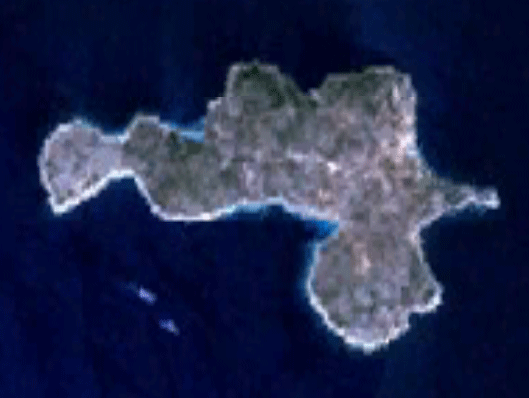
- Satellite image of Drvenik Mali

- Location within Croatia
- Interactive map of Drvenik Mali

Geography
- Location: Adriatic Sea
- Coordinates: 43°26′51″N 16°4′57″E
- Archipelago: Middle-Dalmatian
- Area: 3.43 km^{2} (1.32 sq mi)
- Highest elevation: 79 m (259 ft)

Administration
- Croatia
- County: Split-Dalmatia County

Demographics
- Population: 87 (2011)
- Pop. density: 25.4/km^{2} (65.8/sq mi)
- Ethnic groups: Croats

Drvenik Mali (also called Ploča by local population) is an island in Croatian part of Adriatic Sea. It is situated in middle-Dalmatian archipelago, west of Drvenik Veliki, 8 nautical miles (15 km) from Trogir. Its area is 3.43 square kilometres (1.3 sq mi). The only settlement on the island is the eponymous village with a population of 87 (as of 2011). The coast is well indented and sea around the island is shallow, thus convenient for fishing. The highest peak is 79 metres high. The main vocations on the island are agriculture (mostly olives), fishing and tourism.

Yugoslav torpedo boat T4 ran aground on Drvenik Mali in 1932 and split in half, with one section being towed 240 Kilometers (150 Miles) away, becoming the "world's longest torpedo boat".

== Bibliography ==
- Magaš, Damir; Faričić, Josip (2006). "Geografske osnove suvremenog razvoja otoka Ploče (Drvenika Malog)" [Geographical bases for modern development of Ploča island (Drvenik Mali)] (PDF). Geoadria (in Croatian and English). 11 (1): 17–62. doi:10.15291/geoadria.102.
