= Šolta =

Island in Split-Dalmatia County, Croatia

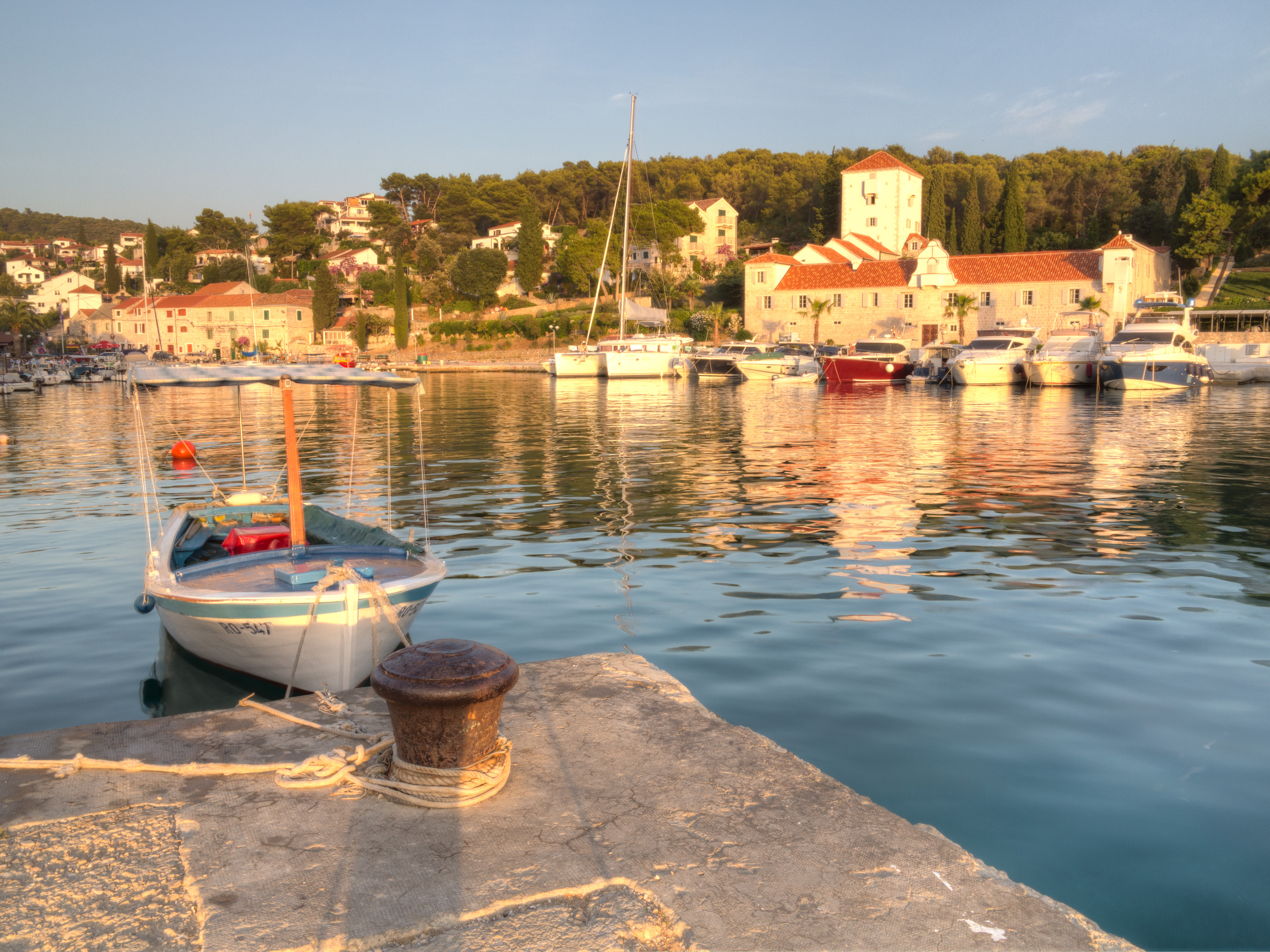
- Šolta

- Location within Croatia
- Interactive map of Šolta

Geography
- Location: Adriatic Sea
- Coordinates: 43.37°N 16.31°E
- Area: 58.98 km^{2} (22.77 sq mi)
- Highest elevation: 238 m (781 ft)
- Highest point: Vela Straža

Administration
- Croatia
- County: Split-Dalmatia County

Demographics
- Population: 1,975 (2021)
- Pop. density: 33.48/km^{2} (86.71/sq mi)

Šolta (pronounced [ʃɔ̂ːlta]; Italian: Solta; Latin: Solentium) is an island in Croatia. It is situated in the Adriatic Sea in the central Dalmatian archipelago.

== Geography ==
Šolta is located west of the island of Brač, south of Split (separated by Split Channel) and east of the Drvenik islands, Drvenik Mali and Drvenik Veli (separated by the Šolta Channel). Its area is 58.98 square kilometres (22.77 mi^{2}).

== Population ==
Historical population
Year	Pop.	±%
1857	1,970	—
1869	2,328	+18.2%
1880	2,556	+9.8%
1890	3,171	+24.1%
1900	3,687	+16.3%
1910	3,516	−4.6%
1921	3,528	+0.3%
1931	3,477	−1.4%
1948	3,060	−12.0%
1953	3,031	−0.9%
1961	2,735	−9.8%
1971	2,098	−23.3%
1981	1,470	−29.9%
1991	1,448	−1.5%
2001	1,479	+2.1%
2011	1,700	+14.9%
2021	1,975	+16.2%
Source: Naselja i stanovništvo Republike Hrvatske 1857–2021, DZS

In the 2011 census, the municipality of Šolta had a total population of 1,700, in the following settlements:

- Donje Selo, population 159
- Gornje Selo, population 238
- Grohote, population 449
- Maslinica, population 208
- Nečujam, population 171
- Rogač, population 126
- Srednje Selo, population 104
- Stomorska, population 245
Šolta: Population trends 1857–2021
v

population	1970	2328	2556	3171	3687	3516	3528	3477	3060	3031	2735	2098	1470	1448	1479	1700	1975
	1857	1869	1880	1890	1900	1910	1921	1931	1948	1953	1961	1971	1981	1991	2001	2011	2021

Sources: Croatian Bureau of Statistics publications

== Island morphology ==
The highest peak of Šolta is the summit Vela Straža which is 236 metres high. On the north-eastern coast of the island there are the large bays of Rogač and Nečujam. In the western part of the interior of Šolta there is a field approximately 6 km (4 mi) long and 2 km (1 mi) wide.

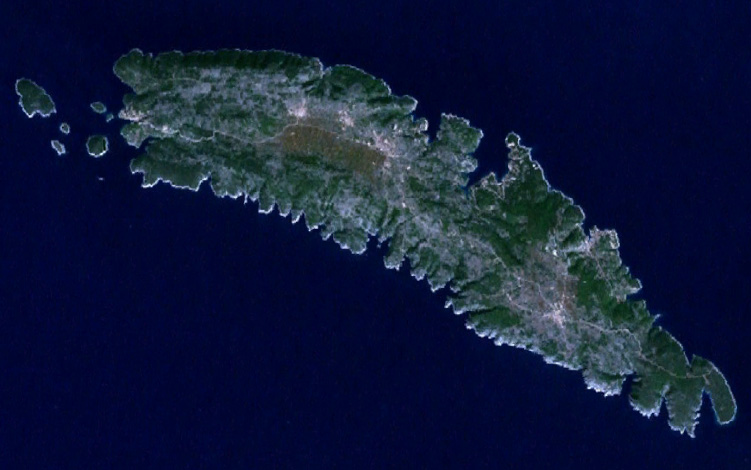
Satellite image of Šolta

== Economy ==
The economy of the island is based on vineyards, olives, fruit, fishing and tourism. While the main settlements (Grohote, Gornje Selo, Srednje Selo, Donje Selo) are inland, the main fishing centres are Maslinica, which is exposed to only north-westerly winds, making it a good shelter for smaller boats. Rogač is the main port and Nečujam the centre of the island's tourism.

=== Viticulture - Dobričic ancestor of Zinfandel ===
Viticulture exists on the island since antiquity. The most famous autochthonous red wine variety is the Dobričić. According to DNA analysis, this variety is one of the original varieties of the American Zinfandel along with the Kaštelanski from the Split area. The American wine pioneer Mike Grgich from Croatia brought the varieties to California. The Split noble family of the father of Croatian literature, Marko Marulić (1450-1524), who also lived on Šolta, were among the first to cultivate the Dobričic intensively. In the 19th century viticulture in Šolta suffered severe setbacks. A trade agreement between Austria and Hungary with Italy allowed low-cost Italian wines to be imported duty-free. Diseases such as downy mildew and phylloxera reduced the stocks. The best qualities of national importance were created in the 1870s and 80s by Pietro degli Alberti from Porto Oliveto di Solta (Maslinica). At the Vienna World Fair in 1873 he received an honorary prize. At the Triester exhibition in 1882 he received a gold medal. Even in the interwar period there was intensive viticulture. As a result of the Titoism command economy, there is still no large wine industry upon the island. The cultivation is almost only for the own use. Some smaller winemakers, e.g. in Donje Selo, sell wine directly. It is also available at the market in Grohote. A large vineyard (on state leasehold land) was laid out for the first time again around 2015 on a hill on the road to Maslinica.

== History ==
During the time of the Austro-Hungarian Empire the villages still have their Italian names. Villa Grohote, Villa Inf. short for Villa Inferior (Donje Selo) with the harbor Porto Olivetto (Maslinica), Villa Media (Srednje Selo) and Villa Superior (Gornje Selo) with the harbor Stomosca (Stomorska). The property tax structure of the Austrian-Hungarian administration was based on "Fractionen". The local parish of Šolta was divided into the cadastral community Grohote, Donje-Selo, Gornje-Selo and Srednje-Selo, i.e. under the Croatian place names. However, Šolta was no longer fully recorded in the land register by the Austrian administration. For parts of the island there is only the cadastre, i.e. site plans of the real estate, in which ownership and usage rights are not directly registered. This makes real estate transactions sometimes difficult.

The Telegraph arrived late at Šolta. In 1874, the k.k. State telegraph station Grohote handed over to the operation at "limited daily services". That was at the same time as in other smaller places of the monarchy as for example in the Carinthian Sankt Paul im Lavanttal or in Pontafel Pontafel.

In April 1941, Šolta came under Axis occupation, first by Italy. Nazi Germany took over after the September 1943 Armistice. In March and April 1944, Šolta was the site of two British-American commando raids ten days apart which took many Nazi prisoners and destroyed numerous installations.

== Image gallery ==
Šolta

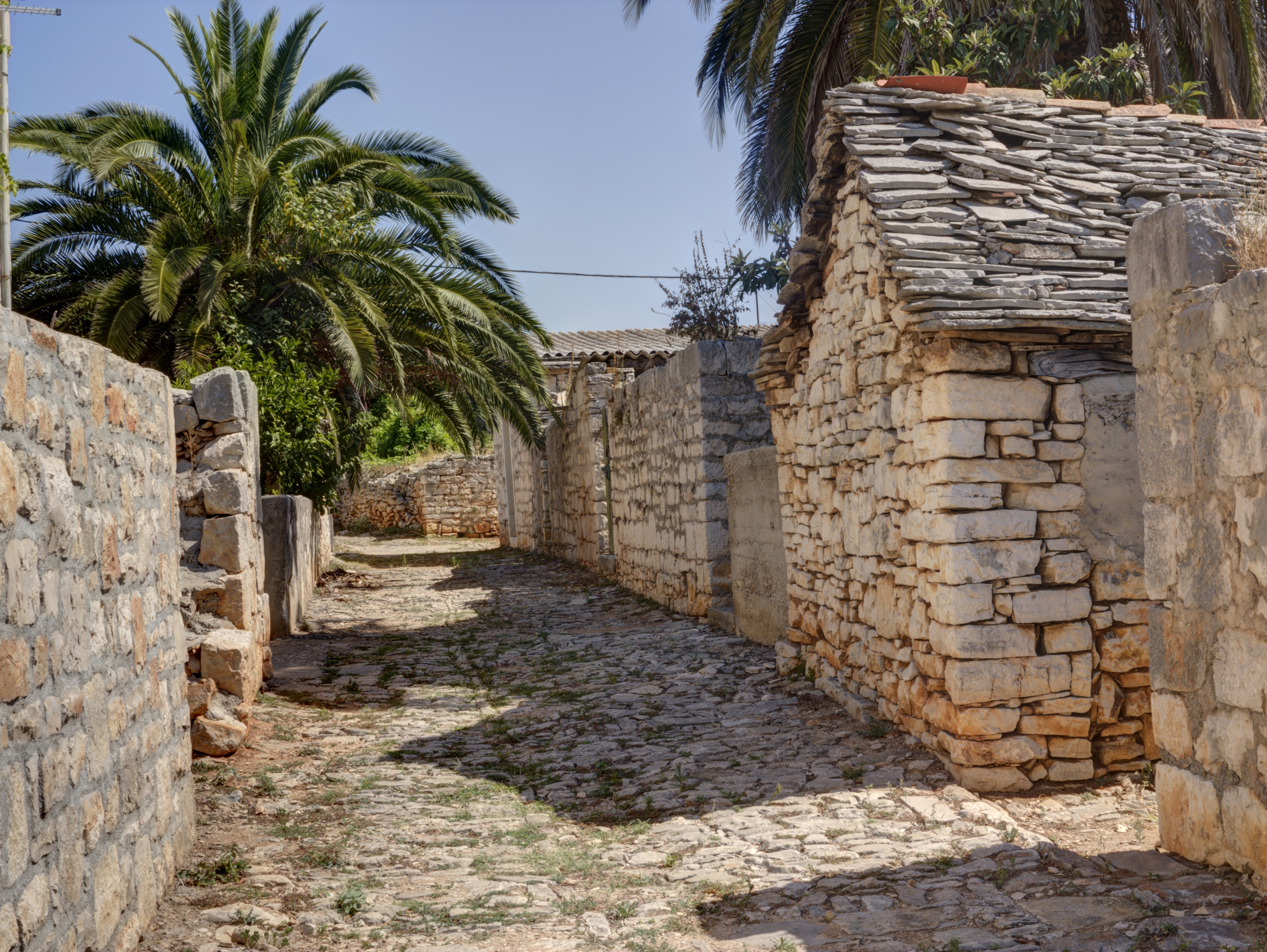
Old lane in Grohote

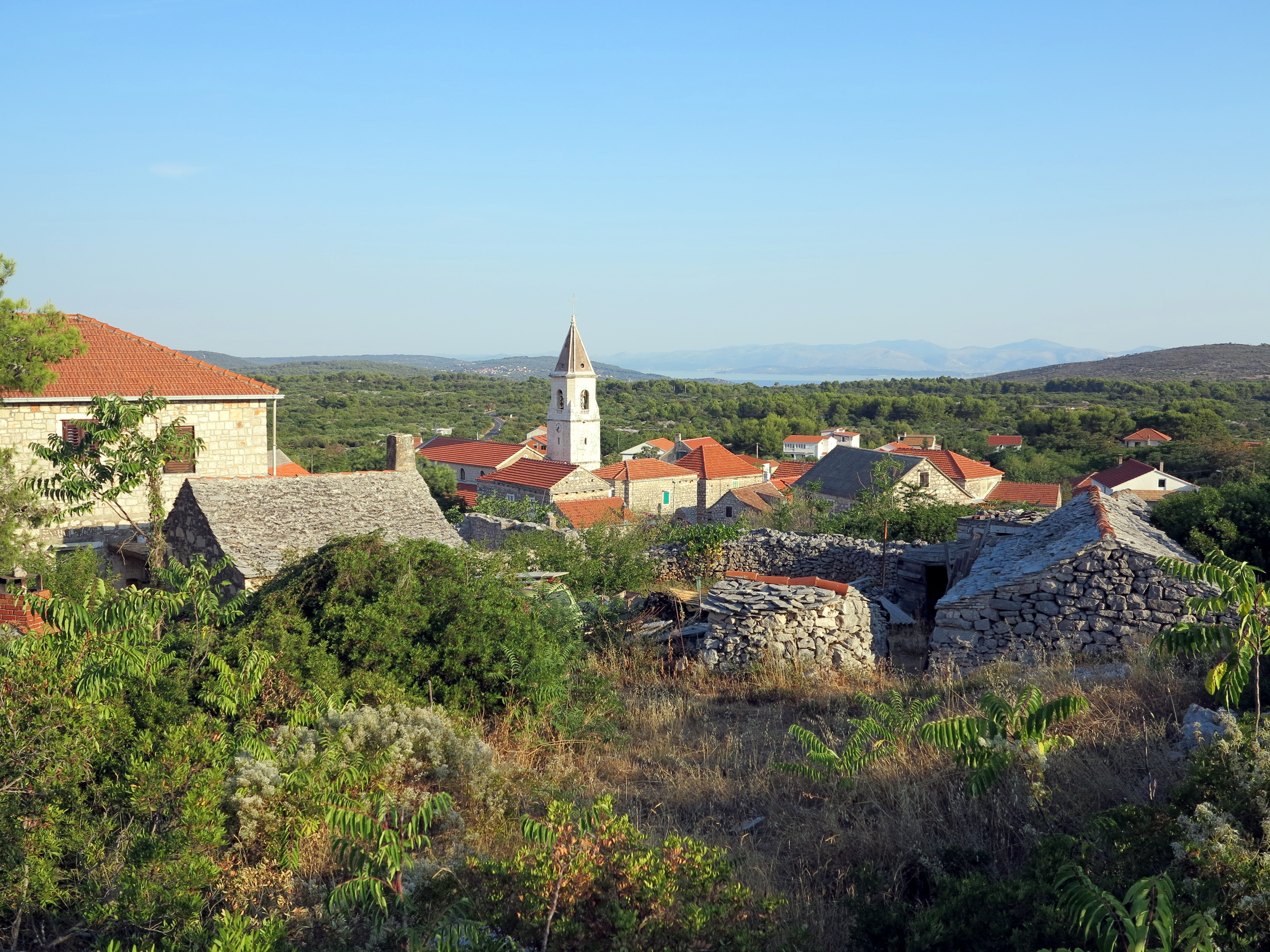
Gornje Selo

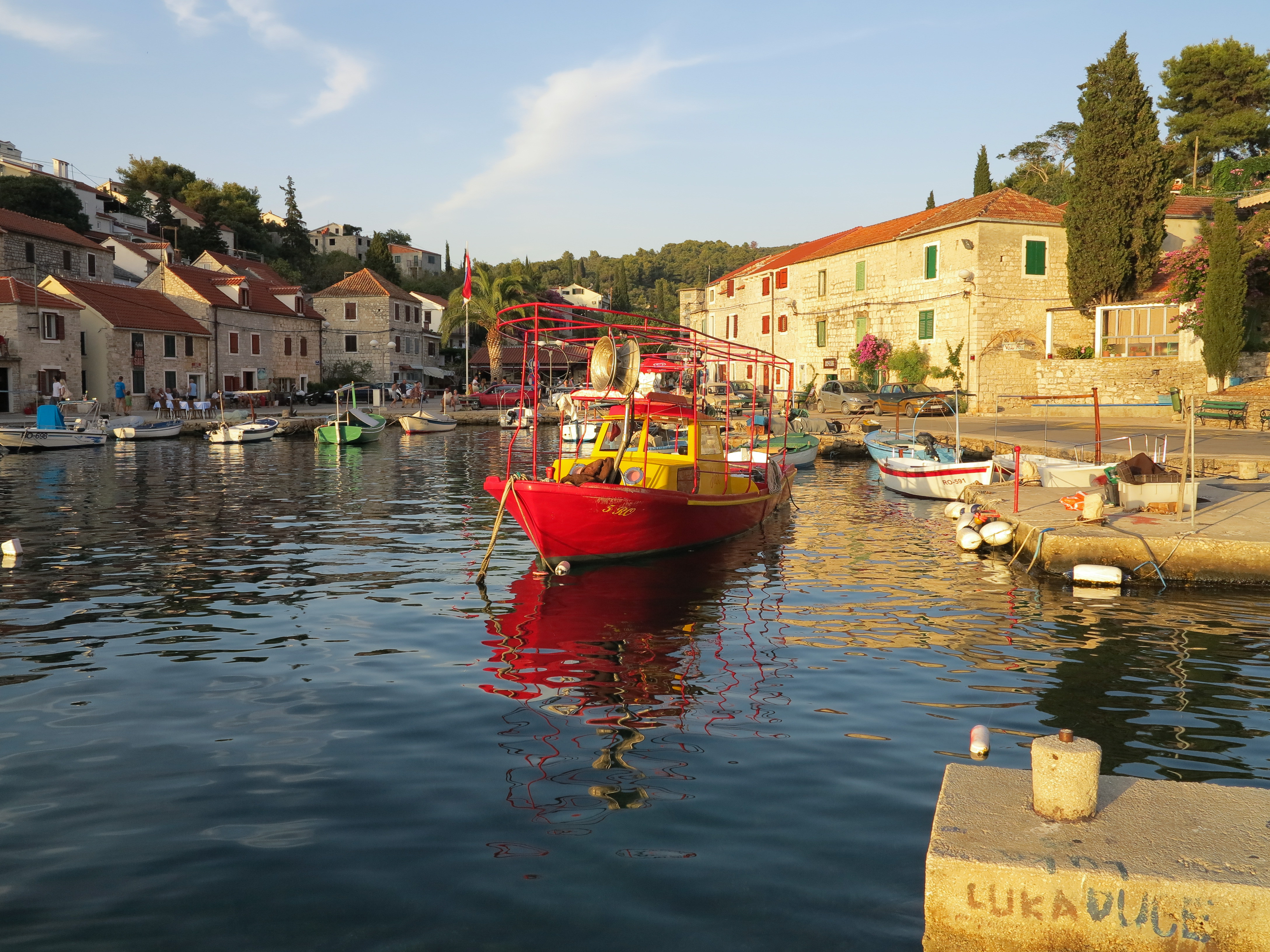
Port of Maslinica

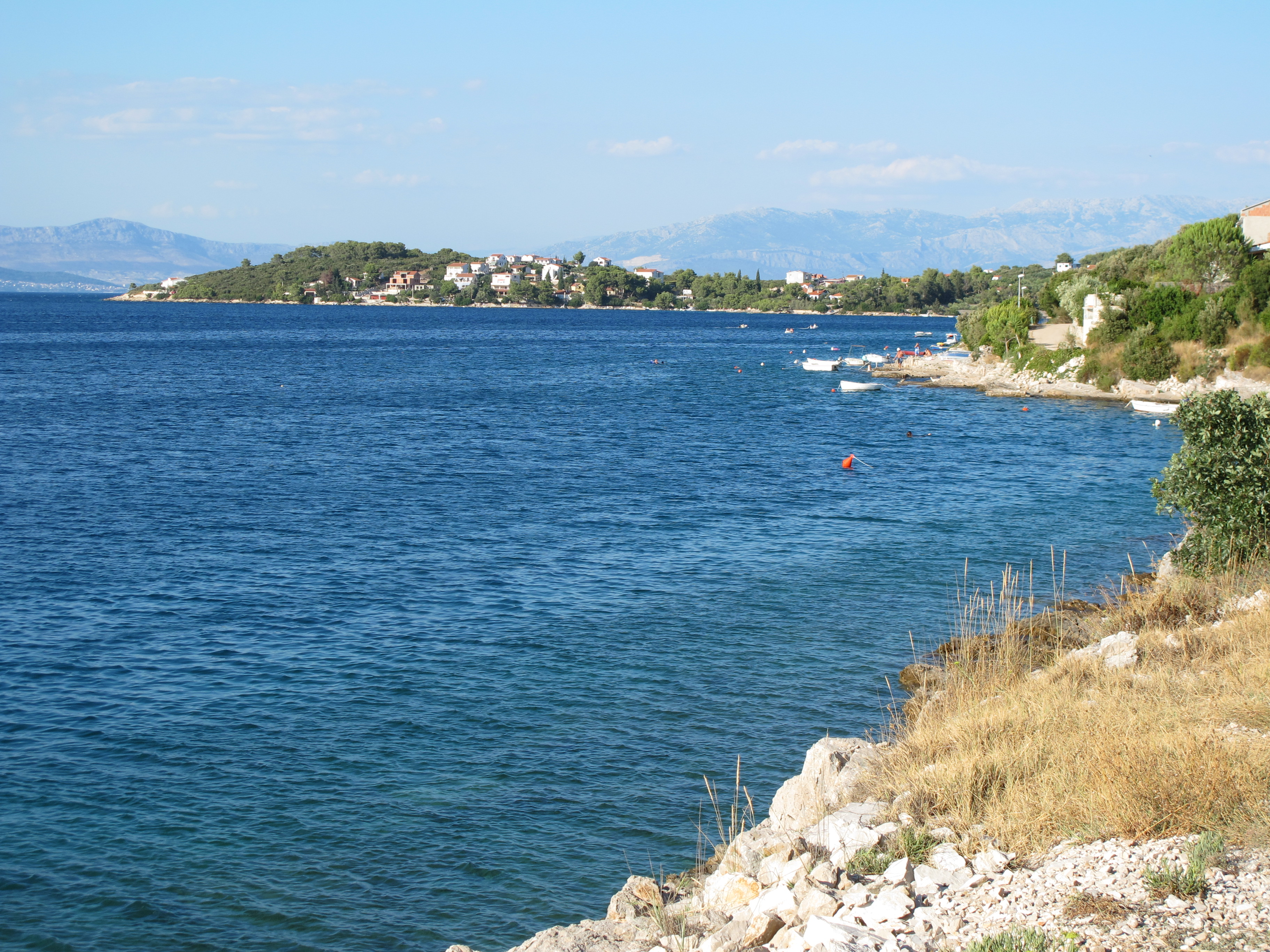
Nečujam

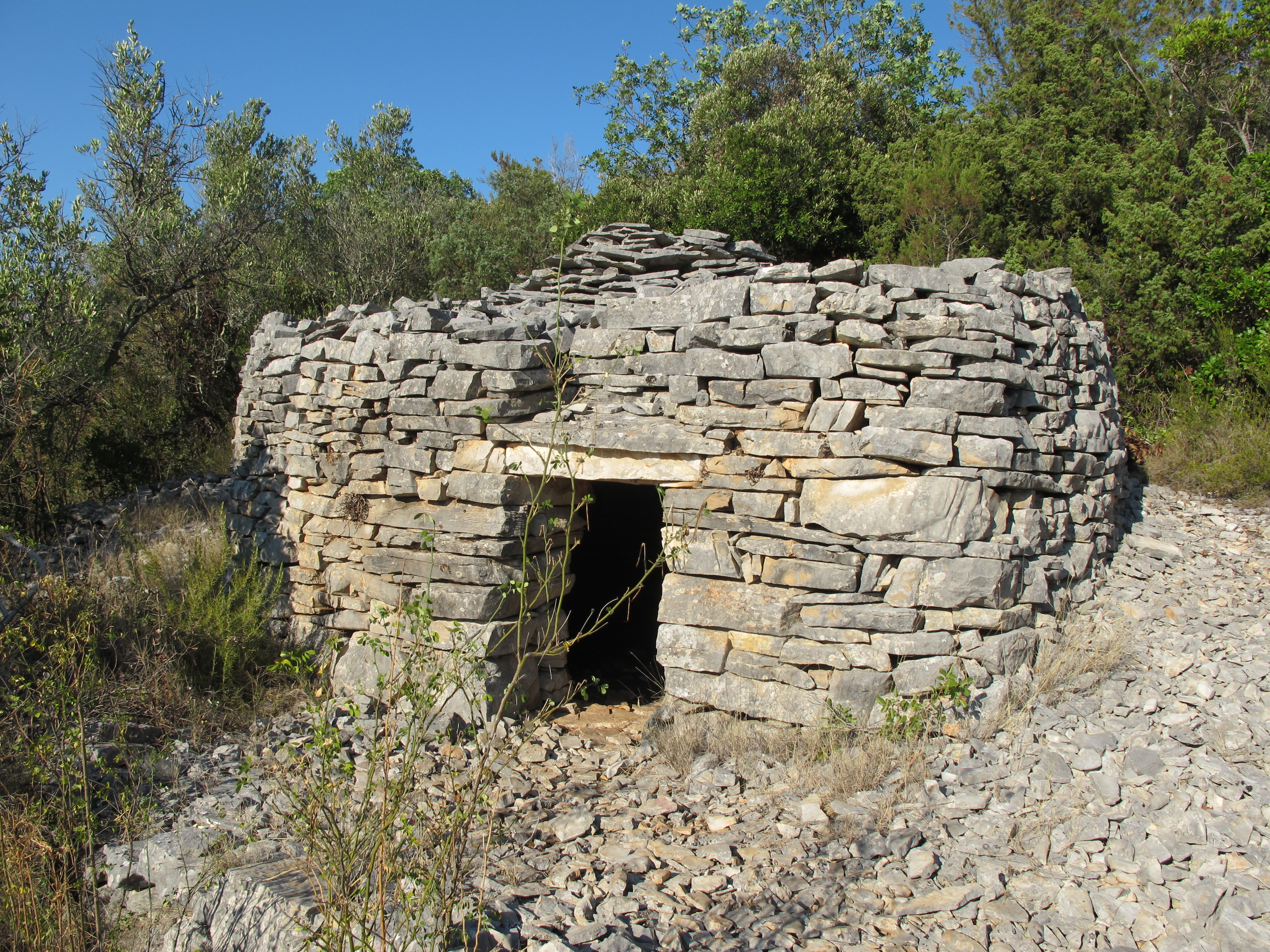
Bunja in Nečujam
