= Judita (disambiguation) =

Judita may refer to:

== People ==
- Judita Čeřovská (1929–2001), German-Czech singer
- Judita Cofman (1936–2001), Yugoslav-German mathematician
- Judita Leitaitė (born 1959), Lithuanian opera singer
- Judita Popović (born 1956), Serbian politician
- Judita Wignall, Member of Halo Friendlies
- Judith of Thuringia (Czech: Judita Durynská), second wife of Duke and later King Vladislaus II of Bohemia and after 1158 the second Queen of Bohemia.

== Others ==
- Judita, a Croatian epic poem, but may also refer to:
- HSC Judita (built 1990), a high speed craft owned and operated by Croatian shipping company Jadrolinija
