= MV Tin Ujević =

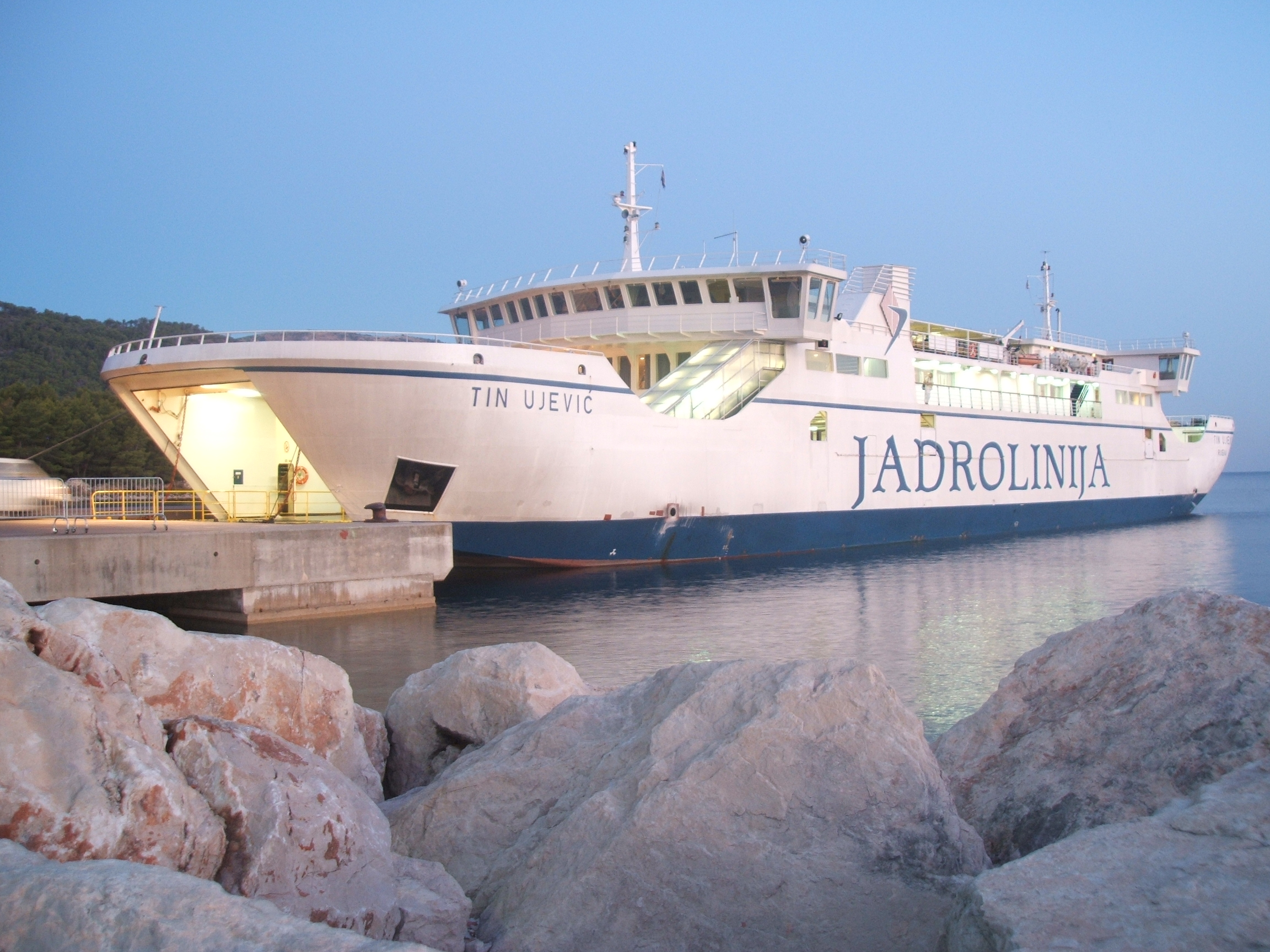
- MF Tin Ujević docked in Stari Grad

History

Croatia
- Name: 2002-2003: Ano Chora Express; 2003 onwards:Tin Ujević
- Owner: 2003 onwards: Jadrolinija
- Operator: 2003 onwards: Jadrolinija
- Port of registry: Rijeka, Croatia
- Route: Split—Stari Grad / Split—Supetar; (as of 2010)
- Builder: Kanellos Bros, Perama, Greece
- Identification: IMO number: 8974207; MMSI number: 238118940; Callsign: 9A8941
- Status: In service

General characteristics
- Class & type: Cruiseferry
- Tonnage: 4,130 GT
- Length: 98.30 m (322 ft 6 in)
- Beam: 17.00 m (55 ft 9 in)
- Draught: 3.10 m (10 ft 2 in)
- Installed power: 4 × Caterpillar 3508B
- Speed: 14.0 knots (25.93 km/h; 16.11 mph)
- Capacity: 1,000 passengers; 200 cars

MF Tin Ujević is a vehicle and passenger cruiseferry owned and operated by Jadrolinija, the Croatian state-owned ferry company. It was built in September 2002 at the Kanellos Bros shipyard in Athens, Greece. In the summer of 2003 Jadrolinija bought it for 7.5 million euros, and introduced her on 4 July 2003 on the Split—Stari Grad route. As of June 2025 it also serves on the Split—Supetar route.

MF Tin Ujević has a capacity of 1,000 passengers and 200 cars and maximum speed is 14.0 knots.

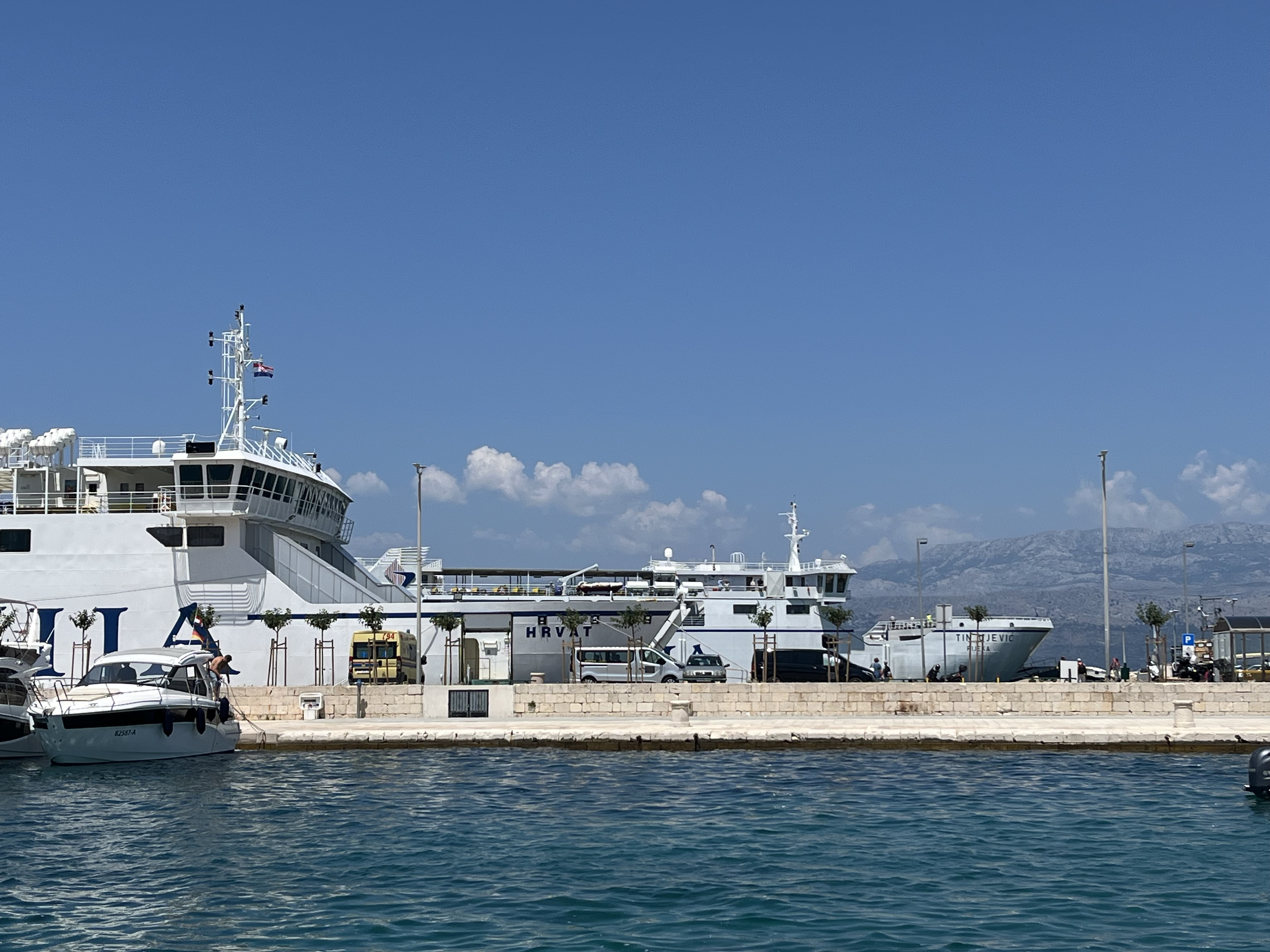
Tin Unević next to MF Hrvat in Supetar Harbor
