= Lastovo (disambiguation) =

Lastovo is an island in Croatia, but may also refer to:

- Lastovo (town), the eponymous town and municipality
- MF Lastovo (built 1969), a ferry owned and operated by Croatian shipping company Jadrolinija
