= MV Jadran =

Croatian ferry (built 2010)

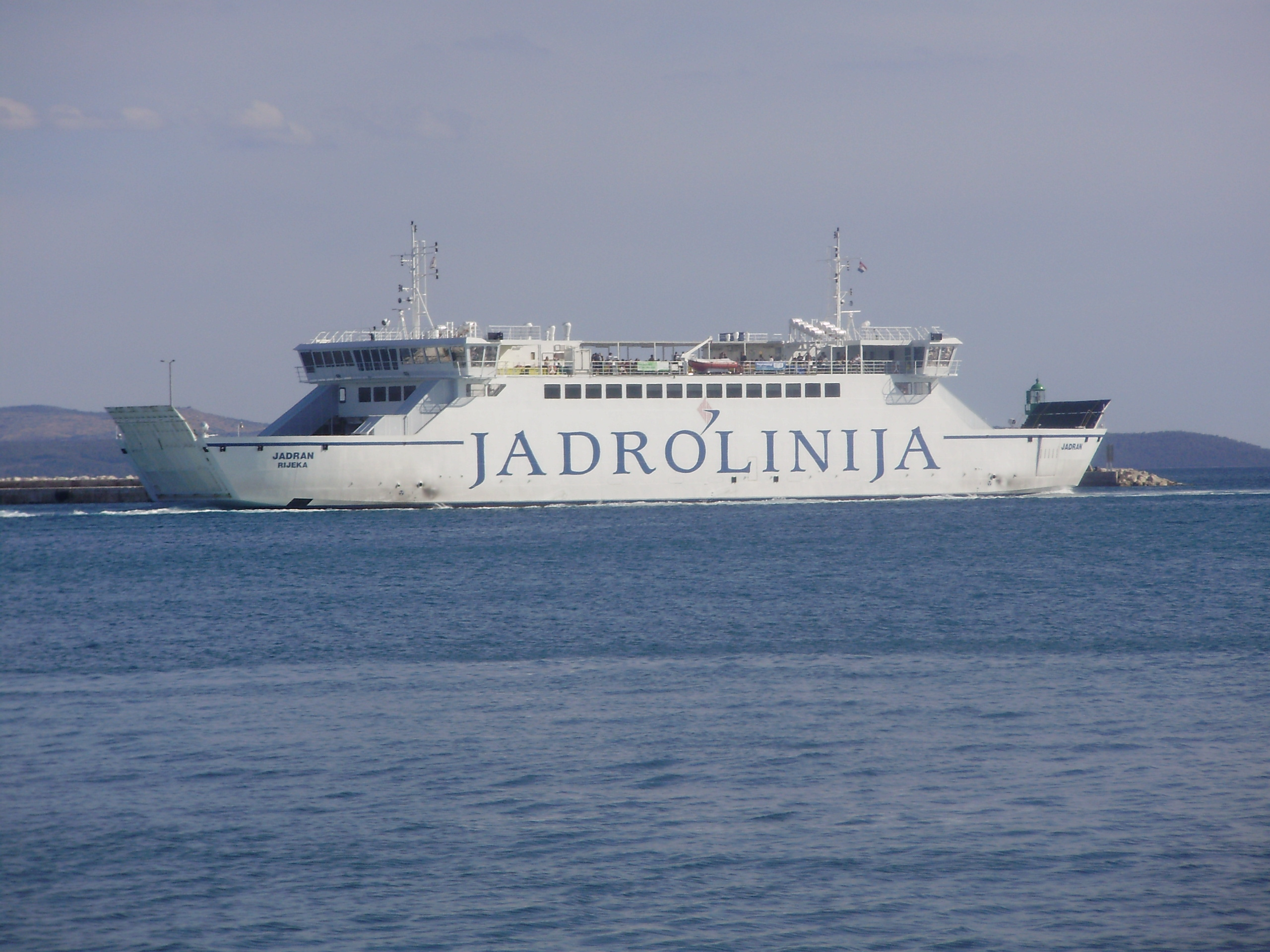
- Jadran in August 2010

History

Croatia
- Name: Jadran
- Owner: 2010 onwards: Jadrolinija
- Operator: 2010 onwards: Jadrolinija
- Port of registry: Rijeka, Croatia
- Route: Split–Stari Grad (as of 2010)
- Builder: Brodosplit, Split, Croatia
- Launched: 5 March 2010
- Christened: 30 May 2010
- In service: 1 June 2010
- Identification: IMO number: 9559119
- Status: In service

General characteristics
- Class & type: Hull 515 class ro-ro ferry
- Tonnage: 3,193 GT; 1,101 NT
- Length: 87.60 m (287 ft 5 in)
- Beam: 17.50 m (57 ft 5 in)
- Draught: 2.40 m (7 ft 10 in)
- Installed power: 4 × Caterpillar 3412 E DITA diesels; (combined 2,148 kW)
- Speed: 13.0 knots (24.1 km/h; 15.0 mph)
- Capacity: 1200 passengers; 138 cars

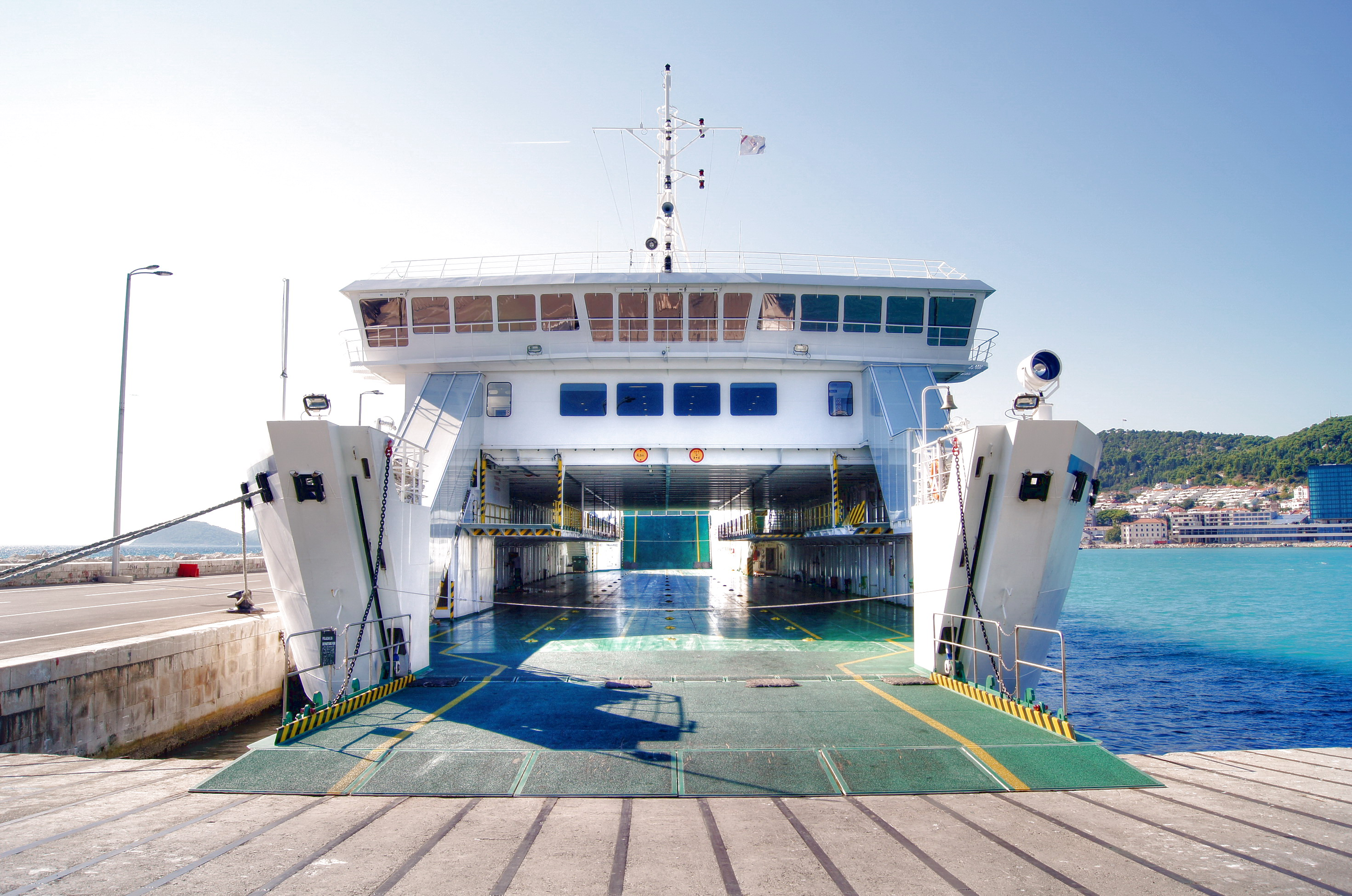
Vehicle deck of Jadran in October 2011.

MF Jadran is a ro-ro vehicle and passenger ferry owned and operated by Jadrolinija, the Croatian state-owned ferry company. She was built in 2010 by the Brodosplit shipyard in Split, Croatia. As of June 2010 she serves on the Split—Stari Grad route. Actual route is Zadar-Preko-Zadar.

MF Jadran is a Hull 515 class ferry, along with her twin, the MV Biokovo, which was also built at Brodosplit in July 2009. These two ferries were commissioned as part of Jadrolinija's fleet renewal program, which (as of June 2010) include a total of eight newly built ships since 2004. These including two other Hull 515 class ferries, the MF Hrvat and MF Juraj Dalmatinac which had been built by the Kraljevica shipyard and delivered in 2007.
