= MF Bartol Kašić =

1989 Croatian car ferry

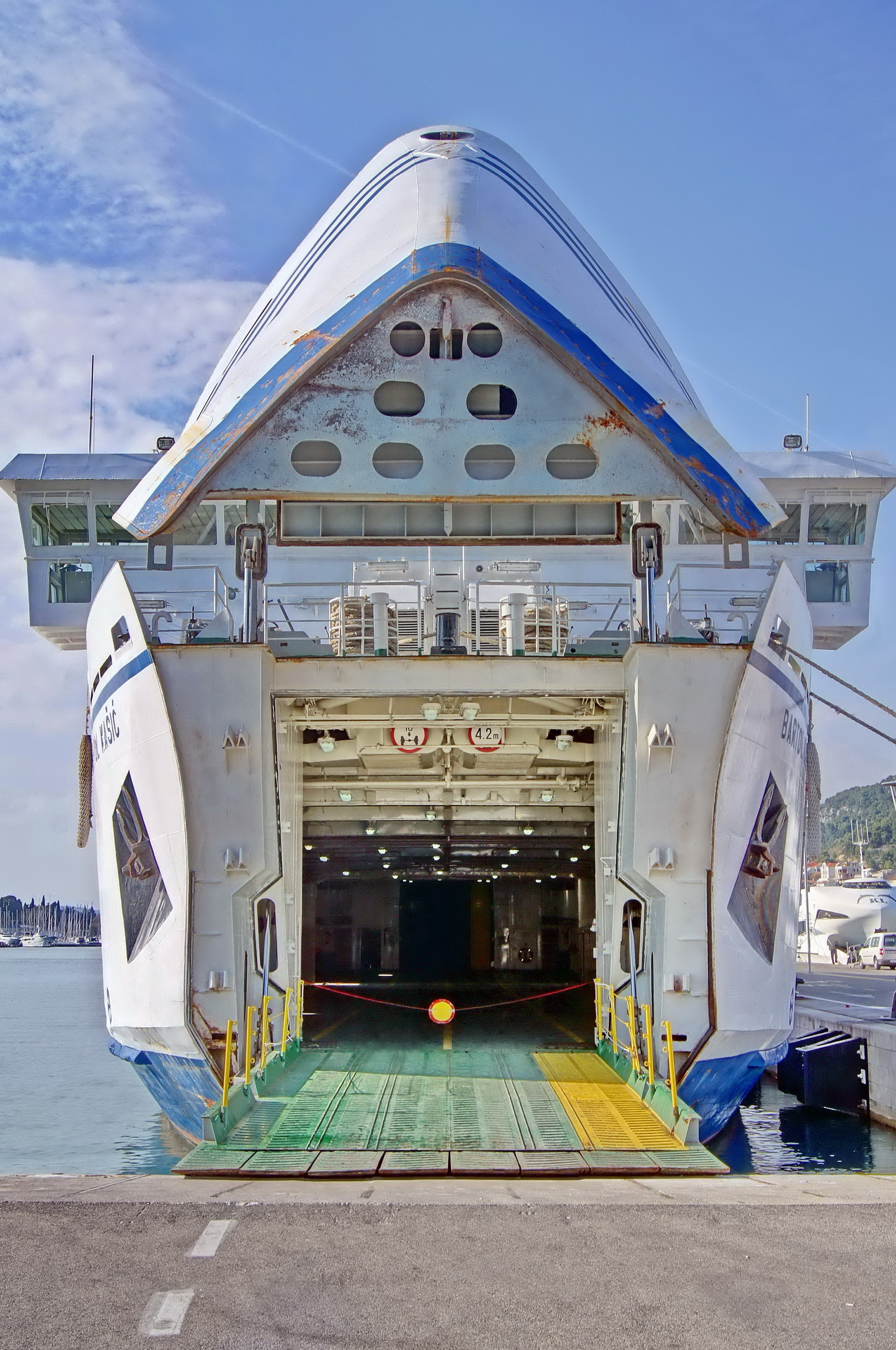
- MF Bartol Kašić docked in the port of Split, Croatia, on Nov 21, 2011

History

Croatia
- Name: Bartol Kašić
- Owner: 1989 onwards: Jadrolinija
- Operator: 1989 onwards: Jadrolinija
- Port of registry: Rijeka, Croatia
- Builder: Kraljevica Shipyard, Croatia
- Yard number: 482
- Launched: 27 January 1989
- In service: 1989
- Identification: IMO number: 8713641
- Status: In service

General characteristics
- Class & type: ro-ro/passenger ship
- Tonnage: 2296
- Length: 64.65 m (212 ft 1 in)
- Beam: 13.8 m (45 ft 3 in)
- Draught: 3.2 m (10 ft 6 in)
- Depth: 4.4 m (14 ft 5 in)
- Speed: 13 knots
- Capacity: 500 passengers; 54 cars

MF Bartol Kašić is a ferry (named after the Croatian linguist Bartol Kašić), built in 1989, operated by Croatian state-owned company Jadrolinija, and navigating on local routes in Croatia. Capacity of the ship is 500 passengers, 54 cars. Maximum speed is 13 knots.

== Accidents ==
In 2006, while docking to the port of Split, the ship hit the shore due to the failure of both engines, wherefore was unable to speed astern. The captain unsuccessfully tried to stop the ship by dropping both anchors. A few passengers were injured and a few cars damaged.

In October 2009, while docking to the port of Žalić, at the island of Silba, the ship hit the pier and the hull was punctured, but water did not penetrate inside, since the damage occurred above the waterline.

In July 2009 the ship hit the shore at the same port.

== Gallery ==
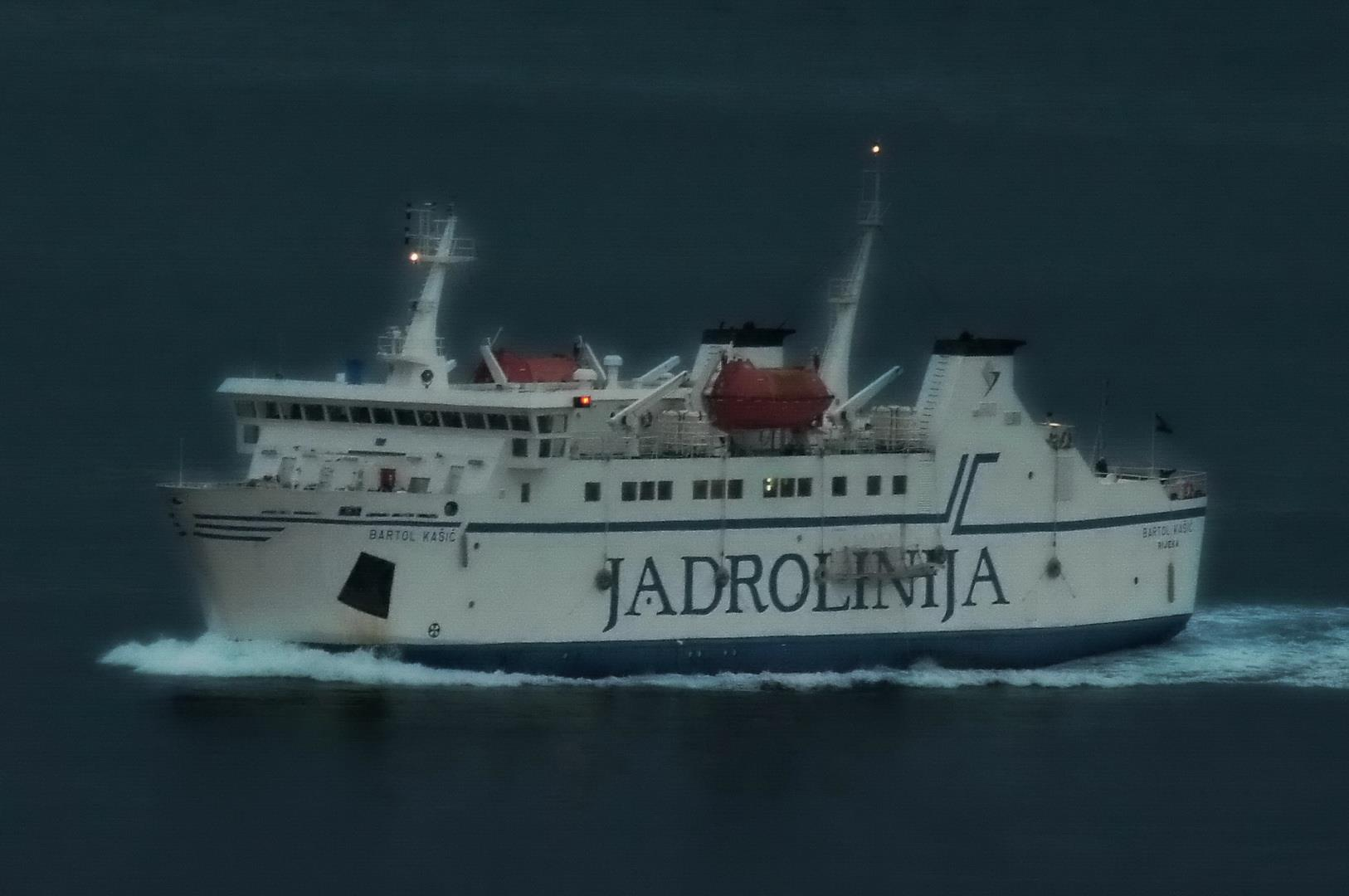
MF Bartol Kašić as seen while arriving to the port of Split on March 26, 2014.
