= MF Bol =

Croatian ferry

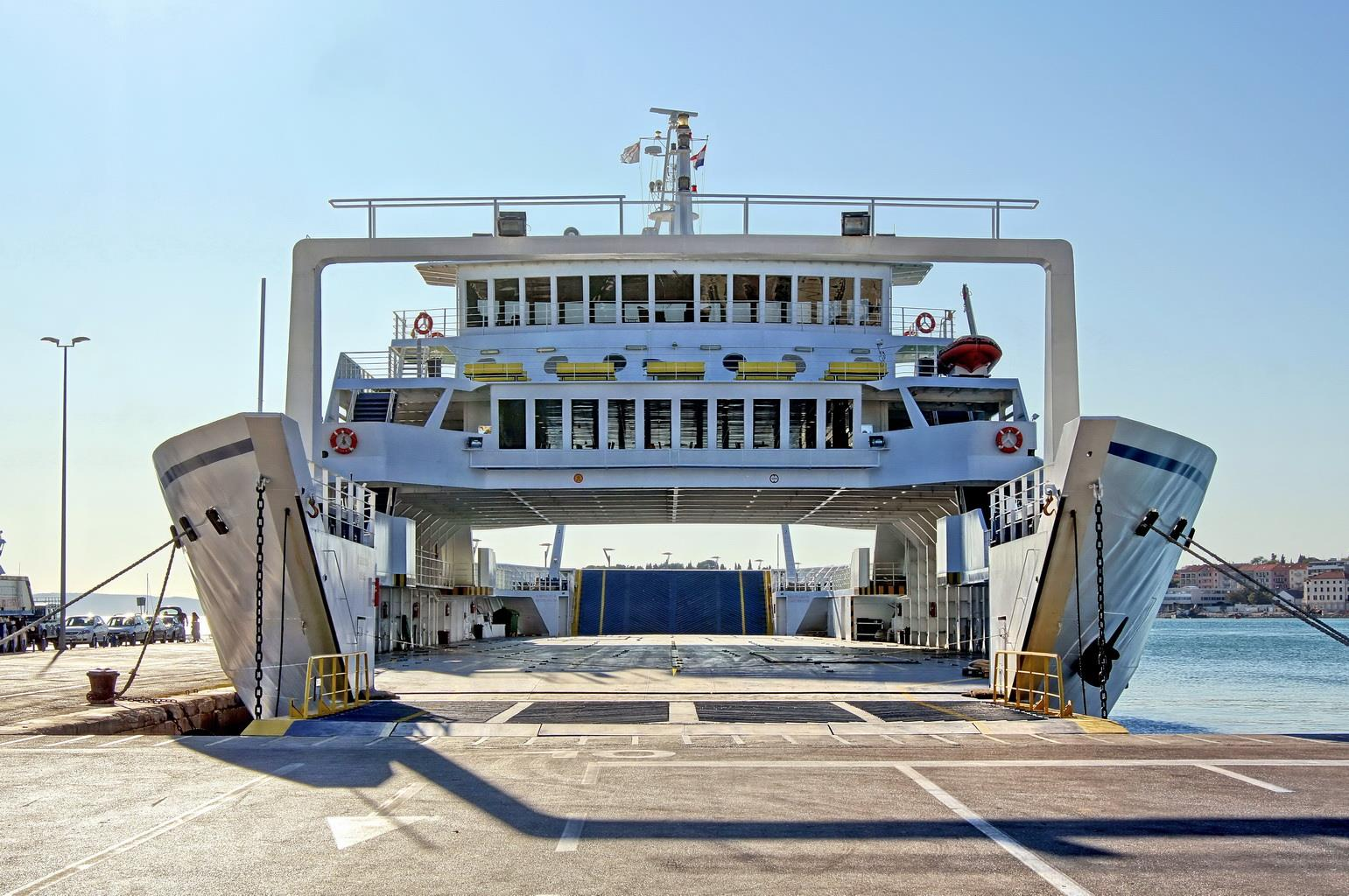
- MF Bol in Split, Croatia, on Oct 14, 2011

History

Croatia
- Name: 2005-2008 Glikofilousa; 2008-onward Bol
- Owner: 2008 onwards: Jadrolinija
- Operator: 2008 onwards: Jadrolinija
- Port of registry: Rijeka, Croatia
- Launched: 2005
- In service: 2005
- Identification: IMO number: 8736344
- Status: In service

General characteristics
- Length: 95.40 m (313 ft 0 in)
- Beam: 20.00 m (65 ft 7 in)
- Draught: 2.30 m (7 ft 7 in)
- Speed: 11.5 kn
- Capacity: 600 passengers; 197 cars

MF Bol is a passenger ferry owned and operated by Jadrolinija, the Croatian state-owned ferry company. The ferry most frequently operates on the Brestova–Porozina route but is currently serving the Valbiska–Merag route. It was built in 2005 in Perama, Greece, for a Greek client and was originally named Glikofilousa. In 2008, it was acquired by Jadrolinija, along with two other ferries that are now known as M/T Ilovik and M/T Korčula. From then until 2009, the ferry operated on the Split–Supetar route. It was later reassigned to the Brestova–Porozina line to improve efficiency. Bol replaced the need for two ferries on that route.

== Gallery ==
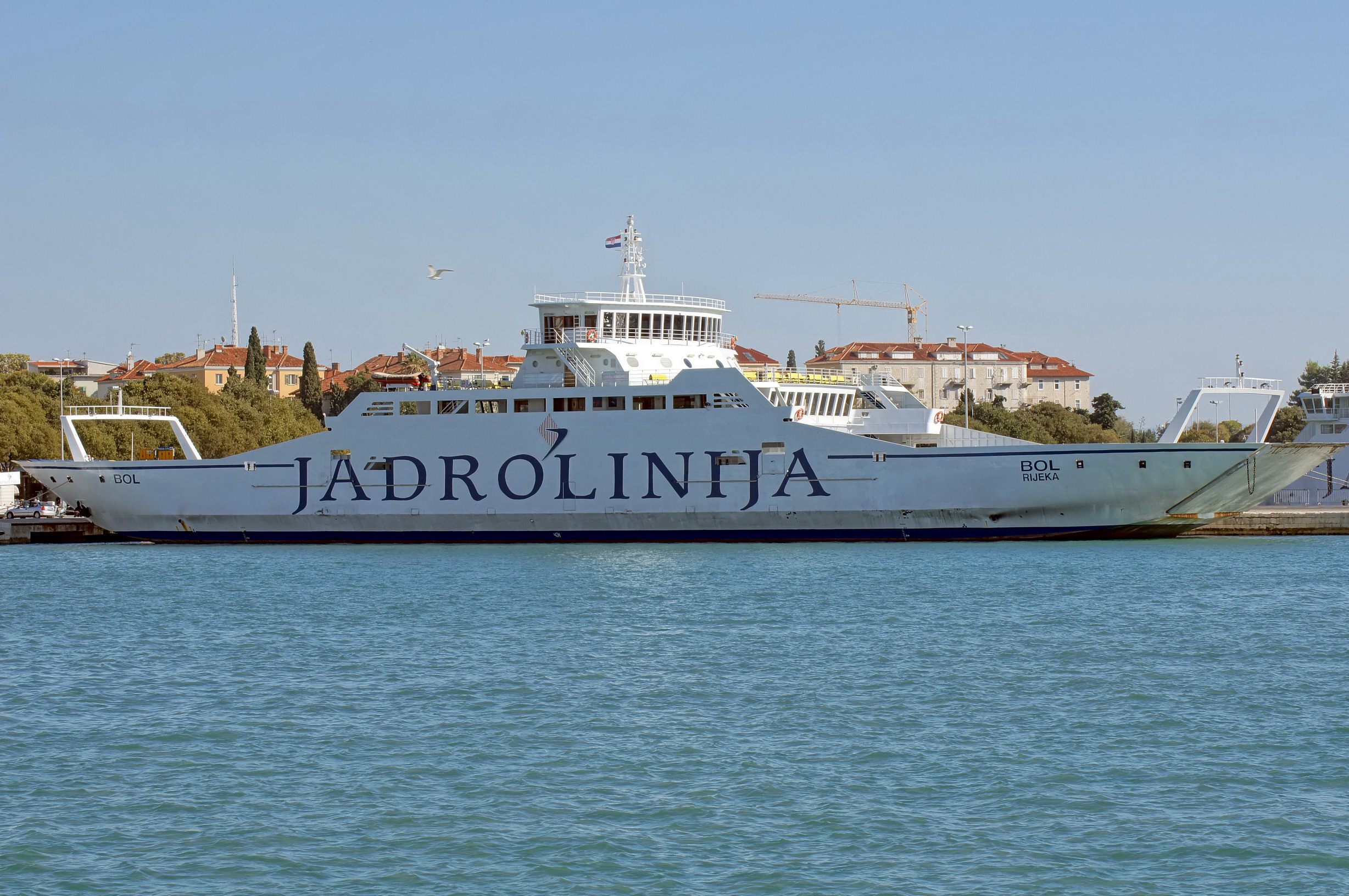

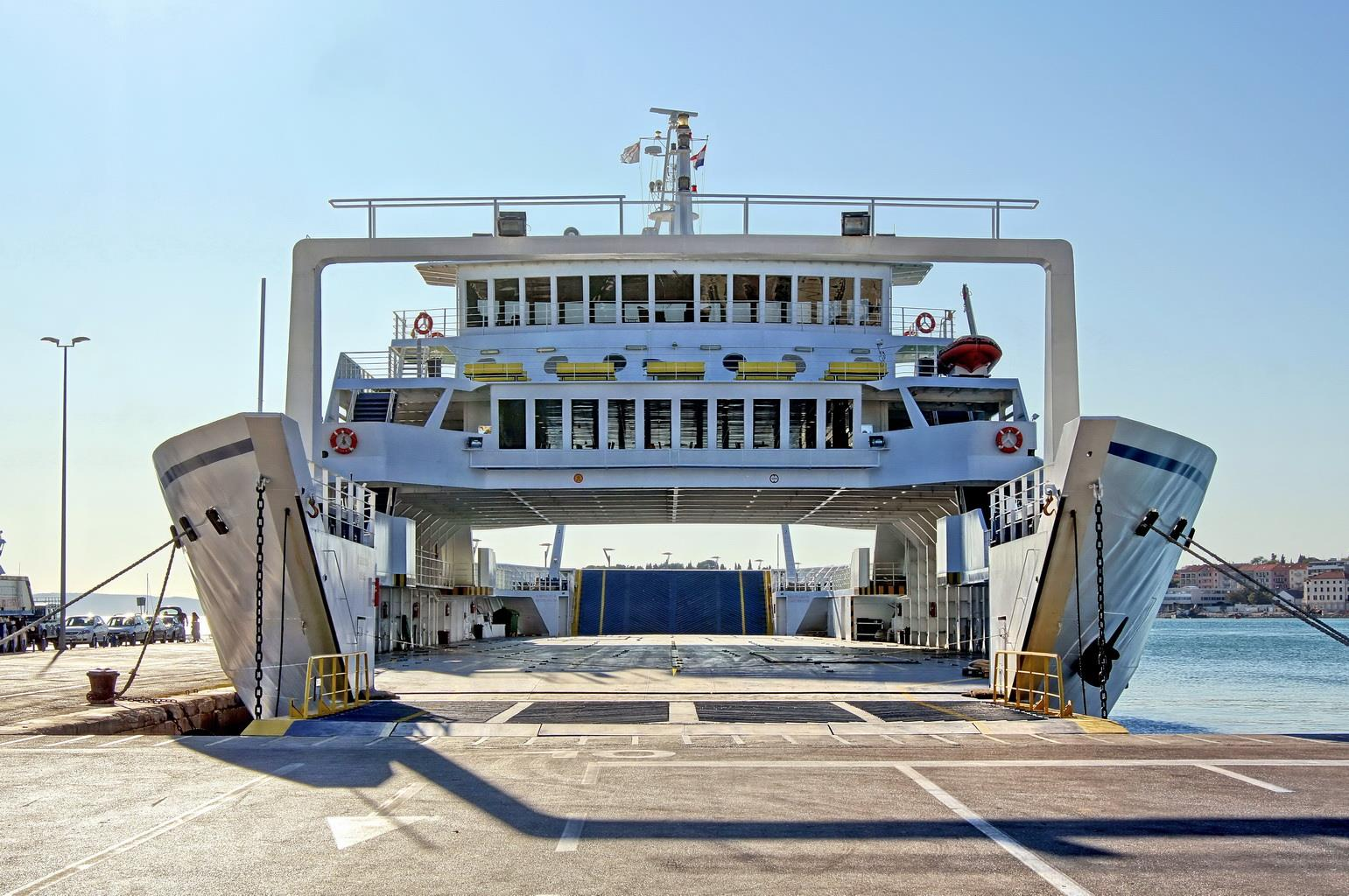

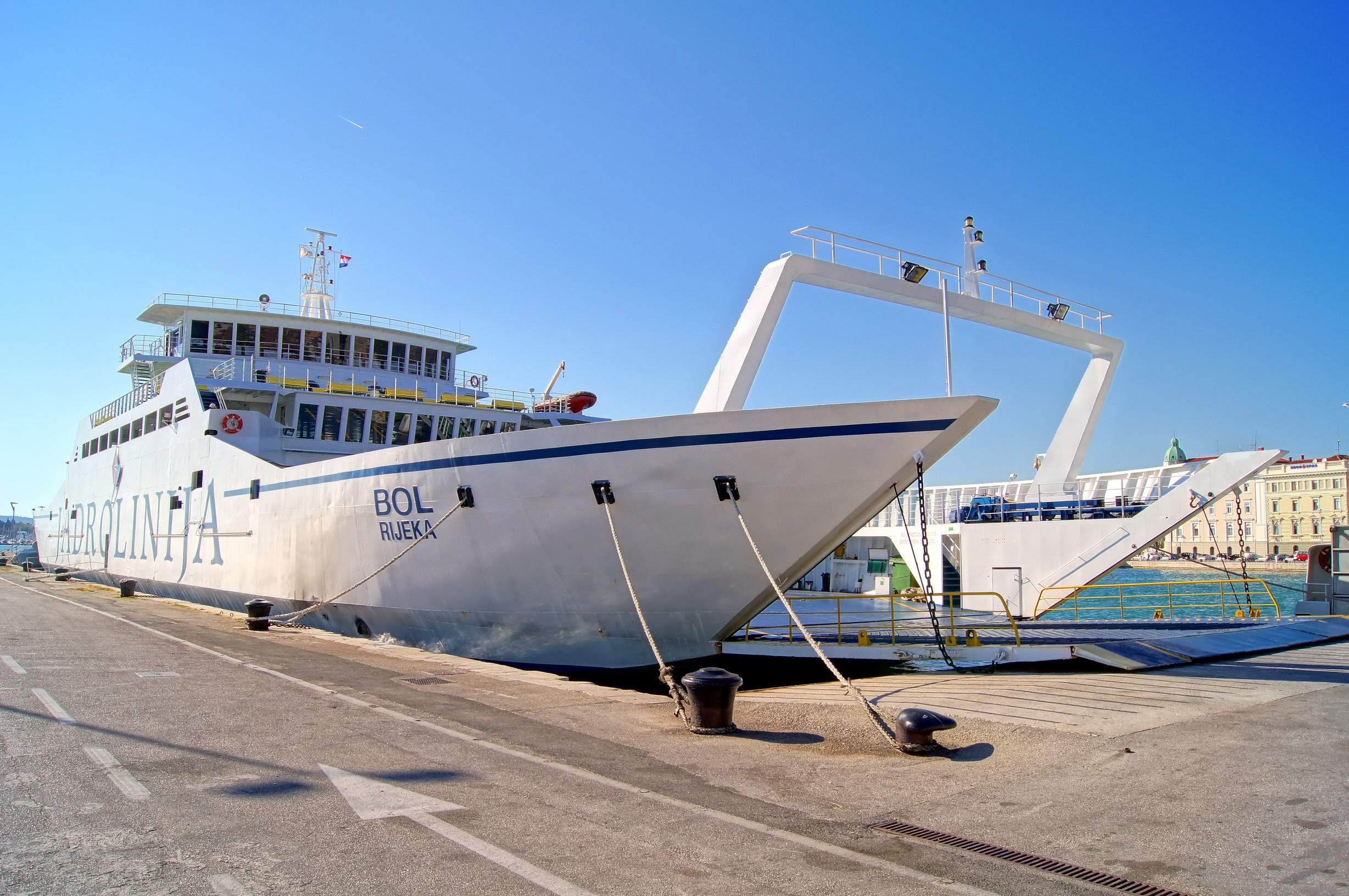
