= MF Vladimir Nazor =

Croatian ferry (built 1986)

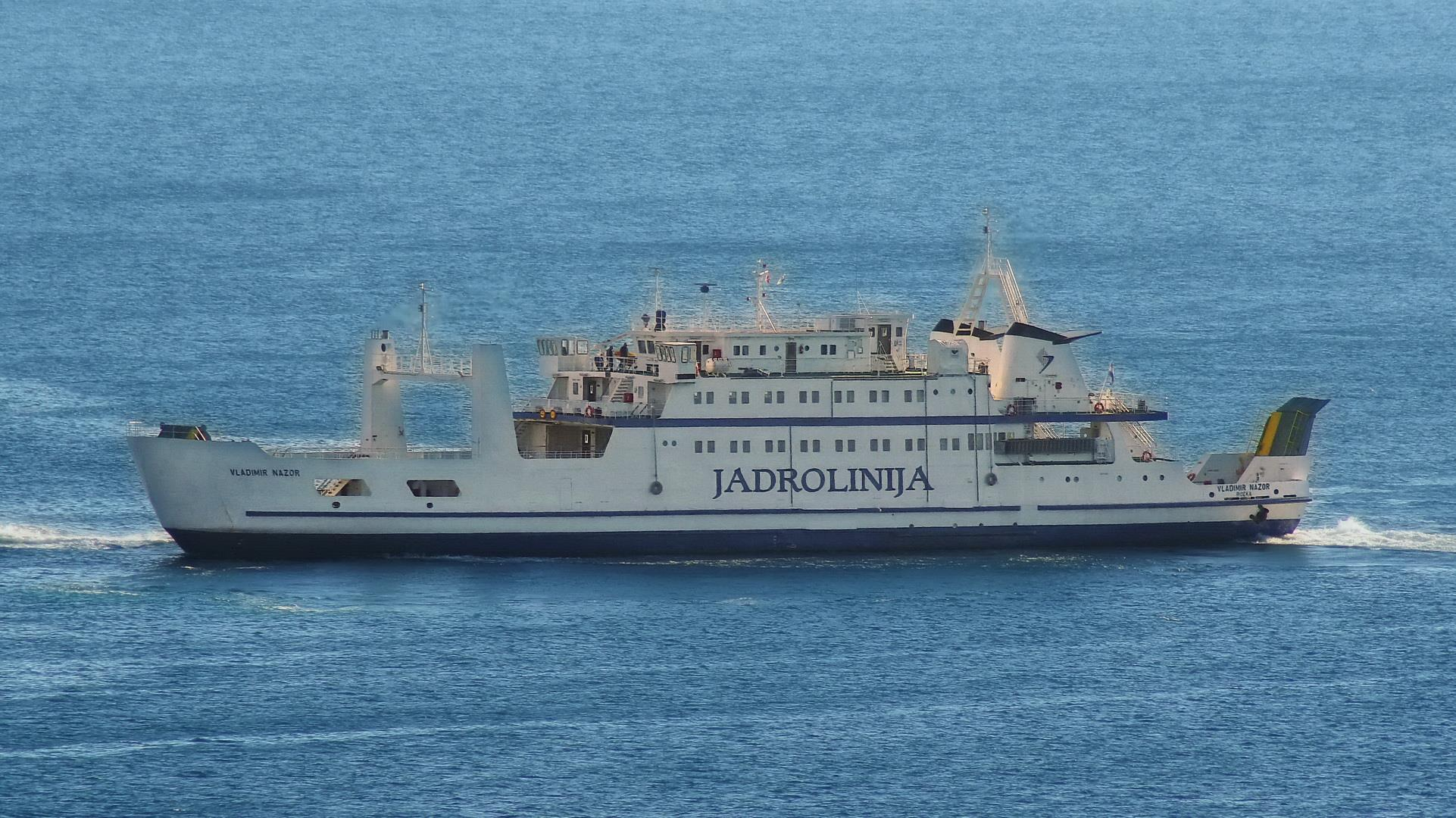
- MF Vladimir Nazor off the port of Split as seen on 25 October 2014

History

Croatia
- Name: Vladimir Nazor (1986 onwards)
- Owner: Jadrolinija (1986 onwards)
- Port of registry: Rijeka, Croatia
- Route: Split–Šolta (currently)
- Builder: Kraljevica Shipyard
- Launched: 1982
- Completed: May 1986
- Home port: Rijeka
- Identification: IMO number: 8108406
- Status: In service

General characteristics
- Type: Ro-Ro passenger ship
- Tonnage: 1,686 GT
- Length: Loa 87 m
- Beam: 14 m
- Draught: 2.6 m
- Speed: 12.5 kn
- Capacity: Passengers 450; Cars 70

MF Vladimir Nazor is a ferry (named after Croatian poet and politician Vladimir Nazor) owned by Croatian shipping company Jadrolinija. It operates on local routes. It was built in Kraljevica Shipyard in 1986, for DINA Petrokemija Company to transport railway boxcars. After the project's collapse it was sold to Jadrolinija and refitted for passenger transport.

== Yugoslav wars ==
In November 1992, the ship suffered damage during the Yugoslav Navy attack on the city of Split, in which two crew members were killed and several others were injured.
