= MV Biokovo =

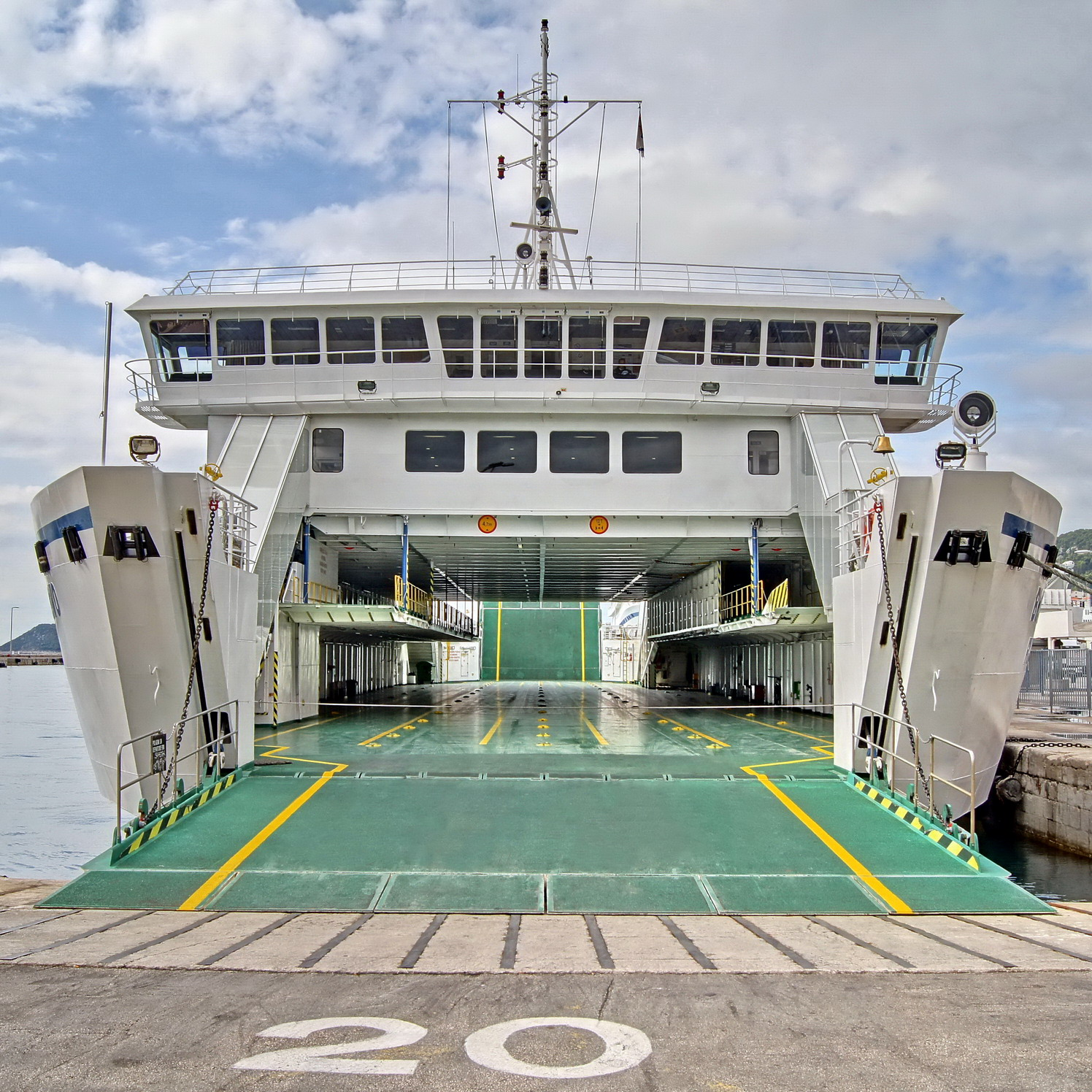

History
- Name: Biokovo
- Owner: 2009 onwards: Jadrolinija
- Operator: 2009 onwards: Jadrolinija
- Port of registry: Rijeka, Croatia
- Route: Split–Supetar (as of 2010)
- Builder: Brodosplit, Split, Croatia
- Launched: 23 May 2009
- In service: 2009
- Identification: IMO number: 9559107
- Status: In service

General characteristics
- Class & type: Hull 515 class ro-ro ferry
- Tonnage: 3,193 GT; 1,101 NT
- Length: 87.60 m (287 ft 5 in)
- Beam: 17.50 m (57 ft 5 in)
- Draught: 2.40 m (7 ft 10 in)
- Installed power: 4 × Caterpillar 537 kW diesels; (combined 2148 kW)
- Speed: 13.0 knots (24.08 km/h; 14.96 mph)
- Capacity: 1200 passengers; 138 cars

MV Biokovo is a ro-ro vehicle and passenger ferry owned and operated by Jadrolinija, the Croatian state-owned ferry company. She was built in July 2009 by the Brodosplit shipyard in Split, Croatia. As of June 2010 she serves on the Split—Supetar route.

MV Biokovo is a Hull 515 class ferry, along with her twin, the MV Jadran, which was also built at Brodosplit in May 2010. These two ferries were commissioned as part of Jadrolinija's fleet renewal program, which (as of June 2010) include a total of eight newly built ships since 2004. These including two other Hull 515 class ferries, the MV Hrvat and MV Juraj Dalmatinac which had been built by the Kraljevica shipyard and delivered in 2007.
