= HSC Karolina =

Croatian high-speed ferry

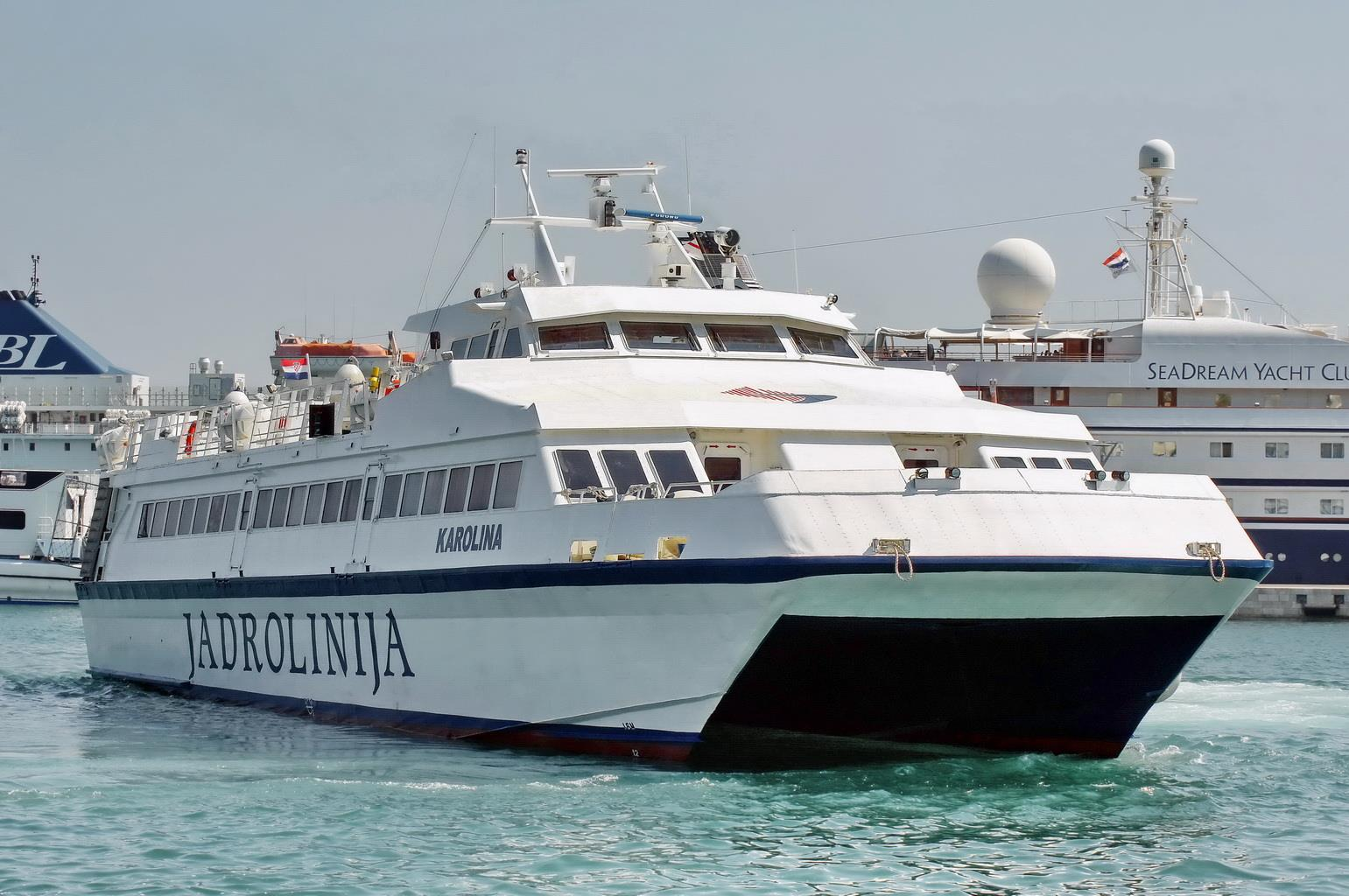
- Karolina departing the port of Split on 20 Jun 2012

History

Croatia
- Name: Estrela do Mar (1989–1995); Supercat 3 (1995–2005); Karolina (2005 onwards)
- Owner: Jadrolinija
- Port of registry: Croatia, Rijeka
- Builder: FBM Marinteknik (S) Pte. Ltd. Singapore
- Yard number: 120
- Laid down: 1988, June
- Launched: 1989, July
- Home port: Split; Croatia
- Identification: IMO number: 8814146
- Status: Ship in service

General characteristics
- Type: High speed passenger craft
- Tonnage: 449 GT; 154 NT
- Length: 41.51 m loa
- Beam: 11m
- Draught: 1.272 m
- Installed power: 3880 kW
- Speed: 32 kn

HSC Karolina is a high speed catamaran passenger ship owned by Croatian shipping company Jadrolinija. The ship was built by FBM Marinteknik of Singapore in 1989 as Estrala do Mar. She has five sisters, of which Dubravka, Judita, and Novalja were also bought by Jadrolinija. In 1995 she was renamed Supercat 3. In 2001 passed to Philippine Fast Ferry Corporation, and was managed by the Supercat Fast Ferry Corporation. Jadrolinija bought her in December 2004 and renamed to Karolina. The ship entered the service in May 2005, sailing on route Rijeka-Rab-Novalja.

== See also ==
- Supercat Fast Ferry Corporation former vessels
