= MF Vis =

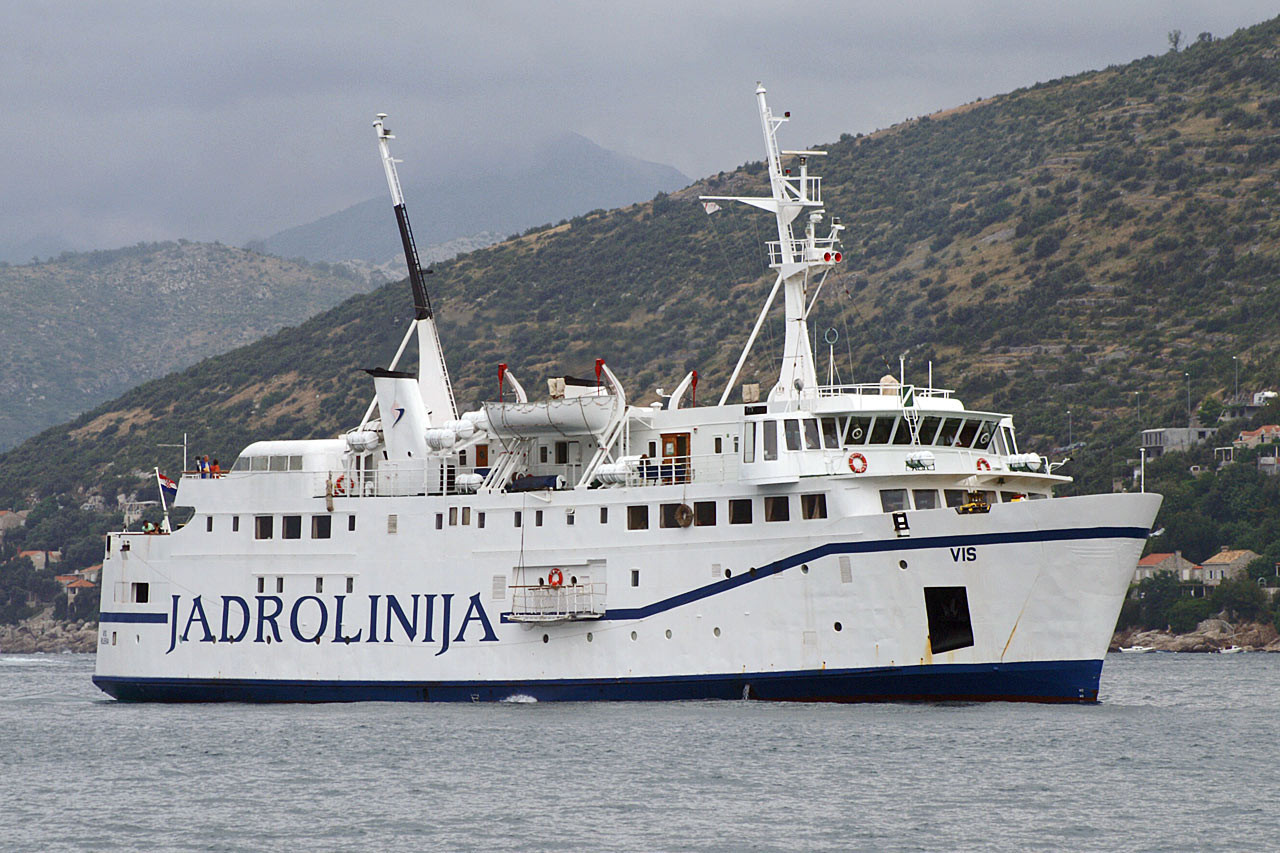
- MF Vis in Dubrovnik

History

Denmark
- Name: Sydfyn
- Owner: Færgefart Nordic
- Operator: Færgefart Nordic
- Port of registry: Denmark
- Route: Gelting – Faaborg
- Builder: Flensburger Schiffbaugesellschaft
- Launched: 12 April 1965
- Maiden voyage: 31 August 1965
- Out of service: 1976
- Fate: Sold to Jadrolinija

Socialist Federal Republic of Yugoslavia
- Name: Vis
- Owner: Jadrolinija
- Operator: Jadrolinija
- Port of registry: Socialist Federal Republic of Yugoslavia
- Route: Split – Hvar – Vis
- Maiden voyage: 1976
- Out of service: 1991
- Fate: Transferred under Croatian flag

Croatia
- Name: Vis
- Owner: Jadrolinija
- Operator: Jadrolinija
- Port of registry: Croatia
- Route: Split – Hvar – Vis (1991–2000); Split – Hvar – Vela Luka (2000–2004); Dubrovnik – Sobra
- Maiden voyage: 1991
- Out of service: 2011
- Fate: Sold to Tuninha Transporte Maritimo

Cape Verde
- Name: Vicente
- Owner: Tuninha Transporte Maritimo
- Operator: Tuninha Transporte Maritimo
- Port of registry: Cape Verde
- Maiden voyage: 2011
- Out of service: 8 January 2015
- Identification: IMO number: 6518279; Callsign: D4GL
- Fate: Sunk on 8 January 2015

General characteristics
- Length: 187.0 ft (57.0 m)
- Beam: 48.9 ft (14.90 m)
- Draught: 10.8 ft (3.29 m)
- Capacity: 500 passengers and 56 cars

MF Vis was a passenger and vehicle ferry built in 1965 by the shipyards Flensburger Schiffbaugesellschaft of Flensburg. It was launched on 12 April 1965 and placed in service on August 31, 1965 as Sydfyn by Færgefart Nordic.

== History ==
The Sydfyn is a ferry built in 1965 by the shipyards Flensburger Schiffbaugesellschaft of Flensburg. It was launched on 12 April 1965 and placed in service on 31 August 1965 as Sydfyn by Færgefart Nordic between Gelting and Faaborg. It leave this itinerary only between 1 February and 10 March 1967, when it was operated by OP-Linien and used between Kastrup and Malmö.

On 11 April 1965, it was sold to Jadrolinija who renamed it Vis. During its career for the Jadrolinija, it ran on three itineraries, while starting between Split, Hvar and Vis. In 1991, it was transferred under Croatian but stayed on the same road. In 2000, Vis is replaced by Vela Luka on its way. Between 2004 and 2011, it made a link between Dubrovnik and Sobra.

In March 2011, it was sold to Tuninha Transporte Maritimo and became Vicente. Its career ended on 8 January 2015 around 8 pm, when it sank near São Filipe in unknown circumstances resulting in the deaths of 22 people.
