= MF Lubenice =

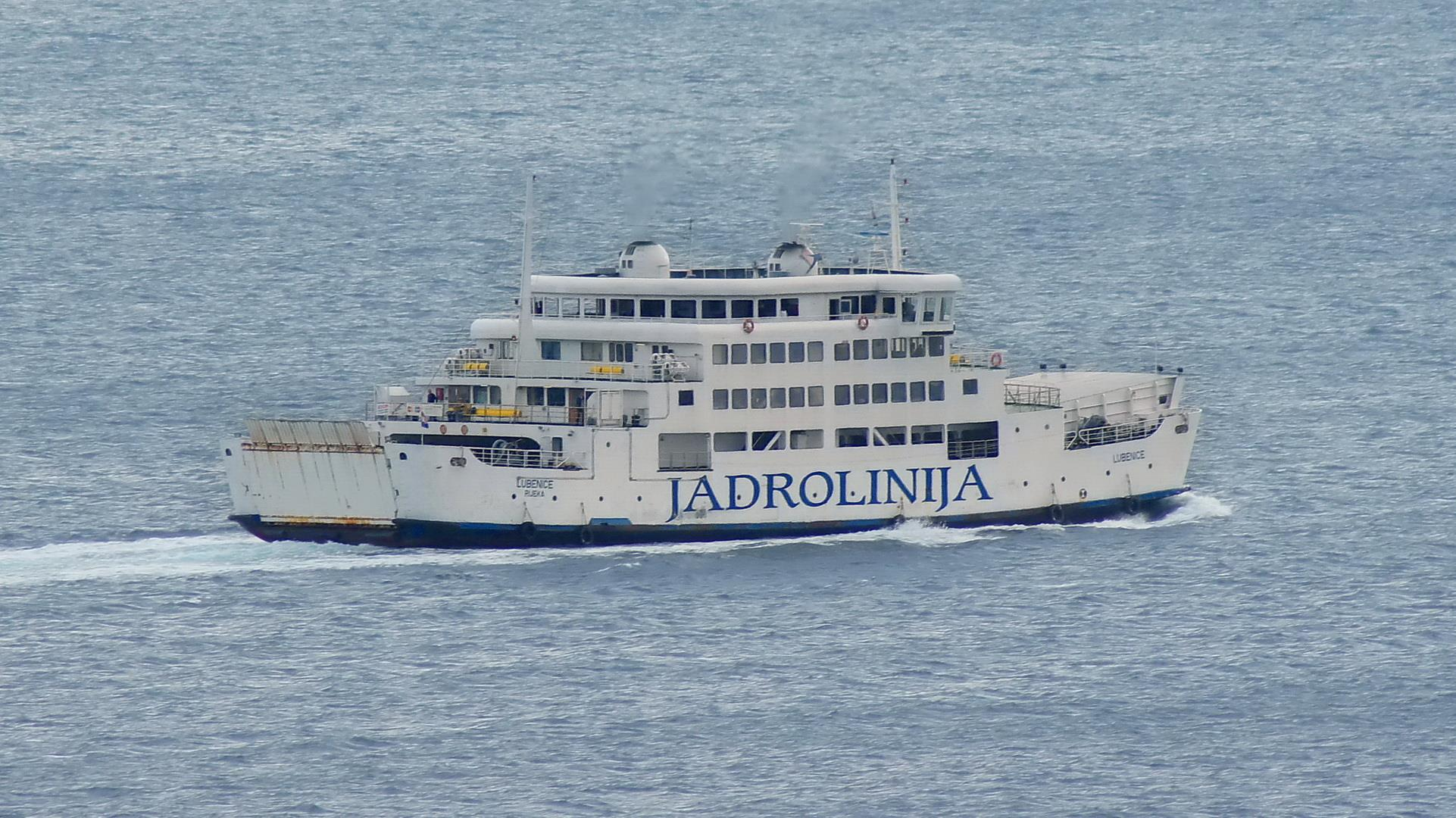
- MF Lubenice departing the port of Split as seen on 24 October 2014

History

Croatia
- Name: Seto (1983–1998); Lubenice (1998–2022)
- Owner: Jadrolinija (1998 onwards)
- Port of registry: Croatia, Rijeka
- Route: Sobra–Prapratno (until 2022)
- Builder: Fujiwara Shipbuilding; Japan, Imabari
- Launched: 1 December 1982
- Maiden voyage: 1983
- In service: 1983
- Out of service: 2022
- Homeport: Croatia, Rijeka
- Identification: IMO number: 8351118
- Fate: Scrapped

General characteristics
- Type: Ro-Ro passenger ship
- Length: 59 m
- Beam: 19 m
- Draught: 3.5 m
- Speed: 13 kn
- Capacity: Passengers 350; Cars 70

MF Lubenice was a ferry owned by Croatian shipping company Jadrolinija that operated on local routes. Built in Japan in 1983. Sold for scrap in 2022.
