= MV Sveti Krševan =

2004 Croatian car ferry

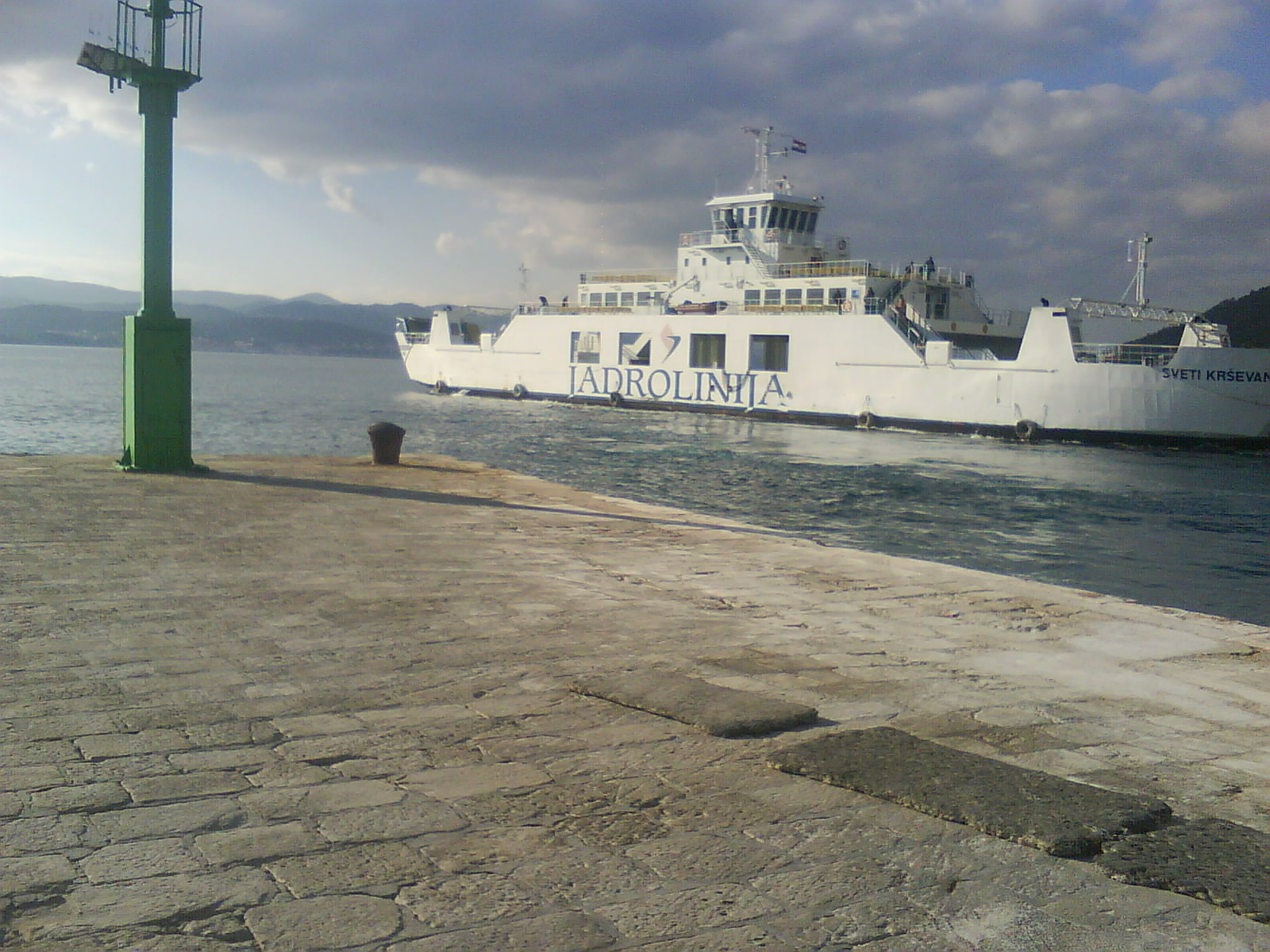
- in 2008

History

Croatia
- Name: Sveti Krševan
- Owner: 2004 onwards: Jadrolinija
- Operator: 2004 onwards: Jadrolinija
- Port of registry: Rijeka, Croatia
- Route: Orebić–Dominče (Korčula); (as of 2010)
- Builder: Kraljevica, Croatia
- Launched: 27 March 2004
- Christened: 21 June 2004
- In service: 2004
- Identification: IMO number: 9326562
- Status: In service

General characteristics
- Class & type: Hull 535 class ro-ro ferry
- Tonnage: 2,438 GT; 781 NT
- Length: 87.60 m (287 ft 5 in)
- Beam: 17.50 m (57 ft 5 in)
- Height: 3.70 m (12 ft 2 in)
- Draught: 2.40 m (7 ft 10 in)
- Installed power: 4 × Caterpillar 403 kW diesels; (combined 1,612 kW)
- Speed: 11.5 knots (21.30 km/h; 13.23 mph)
- Capacity: 600 passengers; 100 cars

MF Sveti Krševan is a ro-ro vehicle and passenger ferry owned and operated by Jadrolinija, the Croatian state-owned ferry company. She was built in 2004 at the Kraljevica Shipyard Ltd. in Kraljevica, Croatia. As of June 2010 she serves on the local route Orebić—Dominče, connecting the Pelješac peninsula and the island of Korčula in southern Dalmatia.

MF Sveti Krševan is a Hull 535 class ferry, along with her twins, the MF Supetar and MF Cres, which are all operated by Jadrolinija. The ferries all have a capacity of 600 passengers and 100 cars and their maximum speed is 11.5 knots.
