= HSC Dubravka =

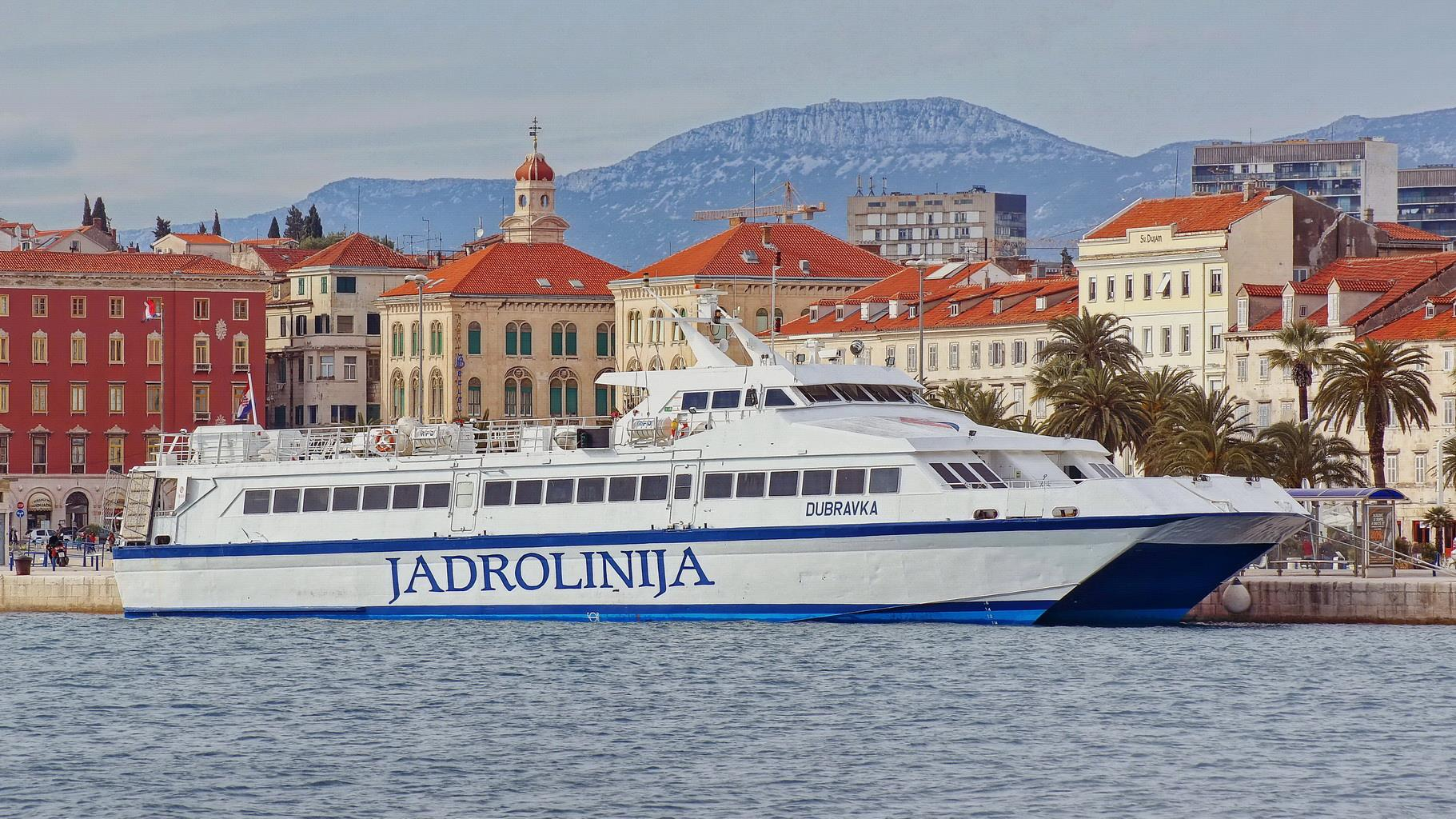
- Dubravka docked in the port of Split

History

Croatia
- Name: 1991-1996: Magellan; 1996-2001: Supercat 8; 2001-onwards: Dubravka
- Owner: 2001-onwards: Jadrolinija
- Operator: Jadrolinija
- Port of registry: Rijeka; Croatia
- Route: Jelsa-Bol-Split
- Builder: FBM Marinteknik (S) Pte. Ltd.; Singapore
- Yard number: 128
- Launched: 1990
- Home port: Split; Croatia
- Identification: IMO number 9034200
- Status: In service

General characteristics
- Type: High speed passenger craft
- Tonnage: GT 458
- Length: 41.57 m
- Beam: 11 m
- Height: 3.8 m
- Draught: 1.265 m
- Installed power: 3878 kW
- Propulsion: DIES,4T1 2
- Speed: 38 kn

HSC Dubravka is a catamaran type passenger ship owned by Croatian shipping company Jadrolinija with a capacity of 306 passengers.

Sisterships: Judita, Karolina, Novalja.
