= HSC Adriana =

Croatian ship built in 1992

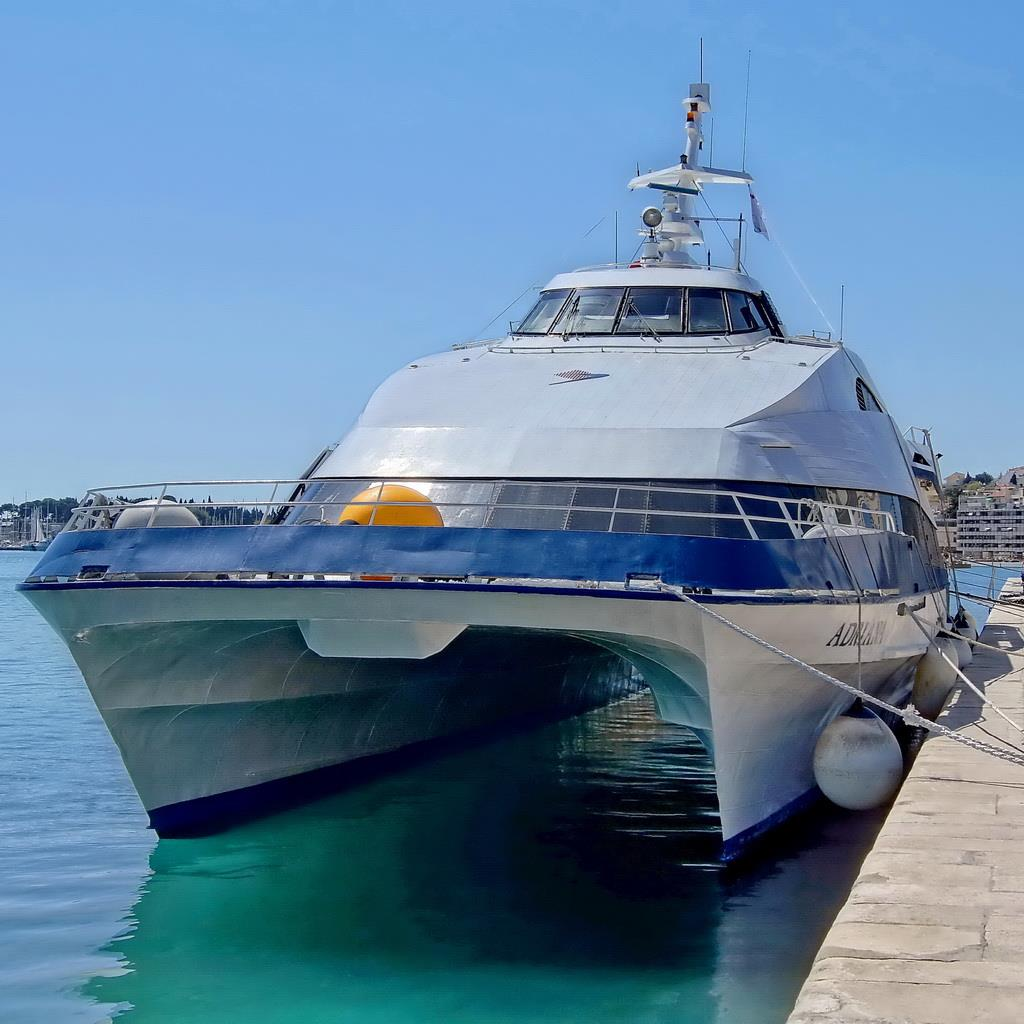
- Adriana docked in the port of Split

History

Croatia
- Name: 1992–1998: Perdana Express; 1998–present: Adriana
- Owner: 1998–present: Jadrolinija
- Operator: Jadrolinija
- Port of registry: Rijeka; Croatia
- Route: Rijeka-Rab-Novalja
- Builder: Kvarner Fjellstrand (S) PTE. LTD.; Singapore
- Yard number: 001
- Laid down: 1 July 1991
- Launched: 1 April 1992
- Renamed: 1992 Perdana Express; 1998 Adriana
- Home port: Rijeka; Croatia
- Identification: IMO number: 9042104; MMSI number: 238112440; Callsign: 9A6282
- Status: In service

General characteristics
- Type: High speed passenger craft
- Tonnage: GT 478
- Length: 40 m (130 ft)
- Beam: 10.1 m (33 ft)
- Height: 3.73 m (12.2 ft)
- Draught: 1.63 m (5 ft 4 in)
- Propulsion: DIES,4T1 2
- Speed: 34 kn (63 km/h; 39 mph)

HSC Adriana is a catamaran type passenger ship owned by Croatian shipping company Jadrolinija. It has a capacity of 325 passengers.
