= MF Lastovo =

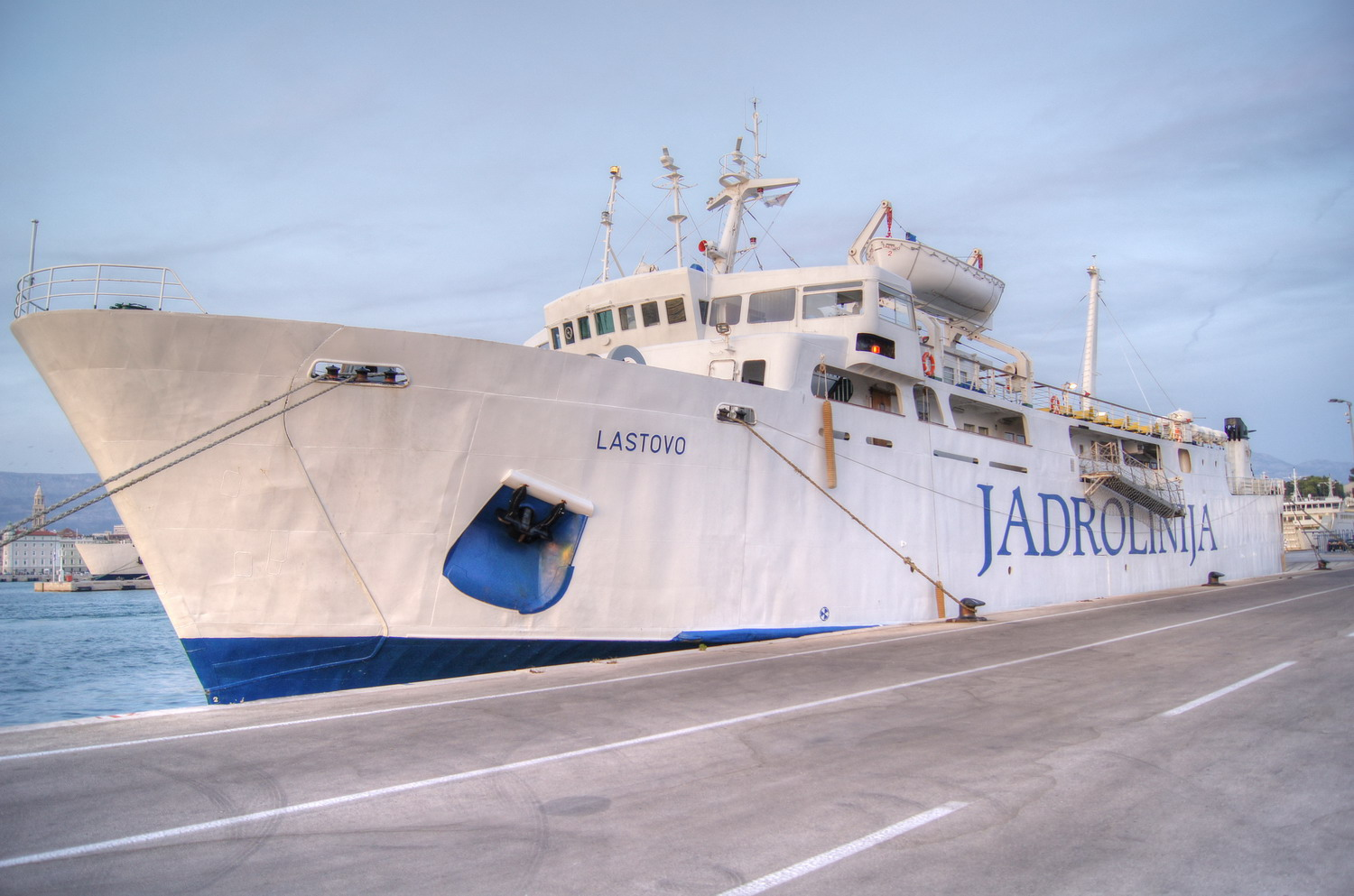
- Lastovo in the port of Split as seen on Sep 18, 2011

History

Croatia
- Name: Ishizuchi (1969-1978) Japan; Partizanka (1978); Lastovo I (1978-1998); Lastovo (1998 onwards)
- Owner: Shikoku Chuo Ferry Boat K.K (1969-1978); Jadrolinija (1978 onwards)
- Port of registry: Croatia, Rijeka
- Route: Kawanoe–Kobe (1969-1978); Zadar–Ist–Olib–Silba–Premuda– Mali Lošinj (currently)
- Builder: Kurushima Dock Co. Ltd.; Japan, Imabari
- Yard number: No. 627
- Launched: 10 December 1969
- Homeport: Croatia, Split
- Identification: IMO number: 7010717
- Status: Ship in service

General characteristics
- Type: Ro-Ro passenger ship
- Tonnage: BRT 1114,63; NRT 339,5
- Length: Loa 72.7 m
- Beam: 13.6 m
- Draught: 3.671 m
- Installed power: 2646 kW
- Propulsion: Internal combustion engine; Dies 4T1 2; MAN B&W Diesel A/s; Frederikshavn, 1969; 2 propellers fix blade
- Speed: 16 kn
- Capacity: Passengers 500; Cars 60

The MF Lastovo is a ferry owned by Croatian shipping company Jadrolinija that operates on local routes. The ship was built in Japan's Kurushima Dock Co. Ltd. for Japanese company Shikoku Chuo Ferry Boat K.K to serve the route between Kawanoe and Kobe. In 1978 the ship was bought by Jadrolinija and renamed, firstly to Partizanka, then, in the same year, to Lastovo I. In the year 1998 the ship was renamed to Lastovo.

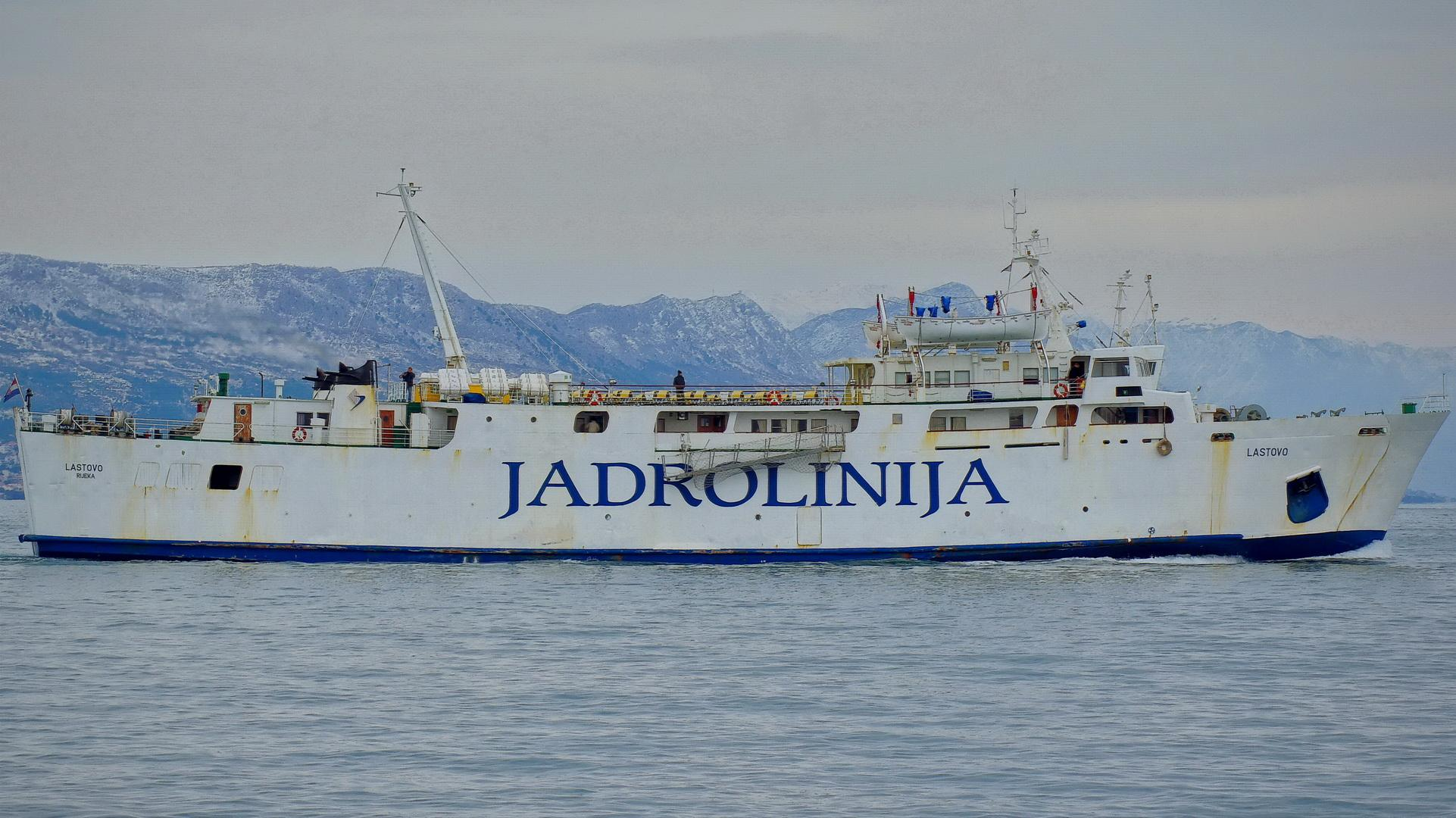
Lastovo departing the port of Split, on Feb 9, 2012

Its capacity is 500 passengers and 60 vehicles. In December 2023, Jadrolinija announced that Lastovo is set to be replaced with a newer and larger ship, also built in Japan, launched in 1997 as Tsurugi, and bought third-hand from a Greek owner; initially renamed as Vela Luka, it was renamed to Oliver during 2024, after Oliver Dragojević.

== Accidents ==
On August 15, 1993, around 7 PM (CEST), while Lastovo I was at a position around 2 nmi from Ubli, the fire broke out in the engine room. The ship had managed to dock, but the fire was extinguished just on Aug 16, 3:30 AM. The badly damaged ship was towed to Split's north port Vranjic. Since the damage was great, the possibility of sending the ship to a scrapyard was considered, but it was finally rejected, and the Jadran-Brodoremont d.o.o. completed the repair on Aug 4, 1994, with new engines installed.

On August 11, 2024, three crew members were killed and one was severely injured when the bow ramp reportedly weighing around 10 tons uncontrollably fell on the crew who were on the dock. The investigation is conducted by the Port Captaincy of Rijeka; the Ministry of Maritime Affairs, Transport and Infrastructure; and the Air, Maritime and Railway Traffic Accidents Investigation Agency.
