= Jadrolinija =

Croatian state-owned shipping company

Jadrolinija d.d.

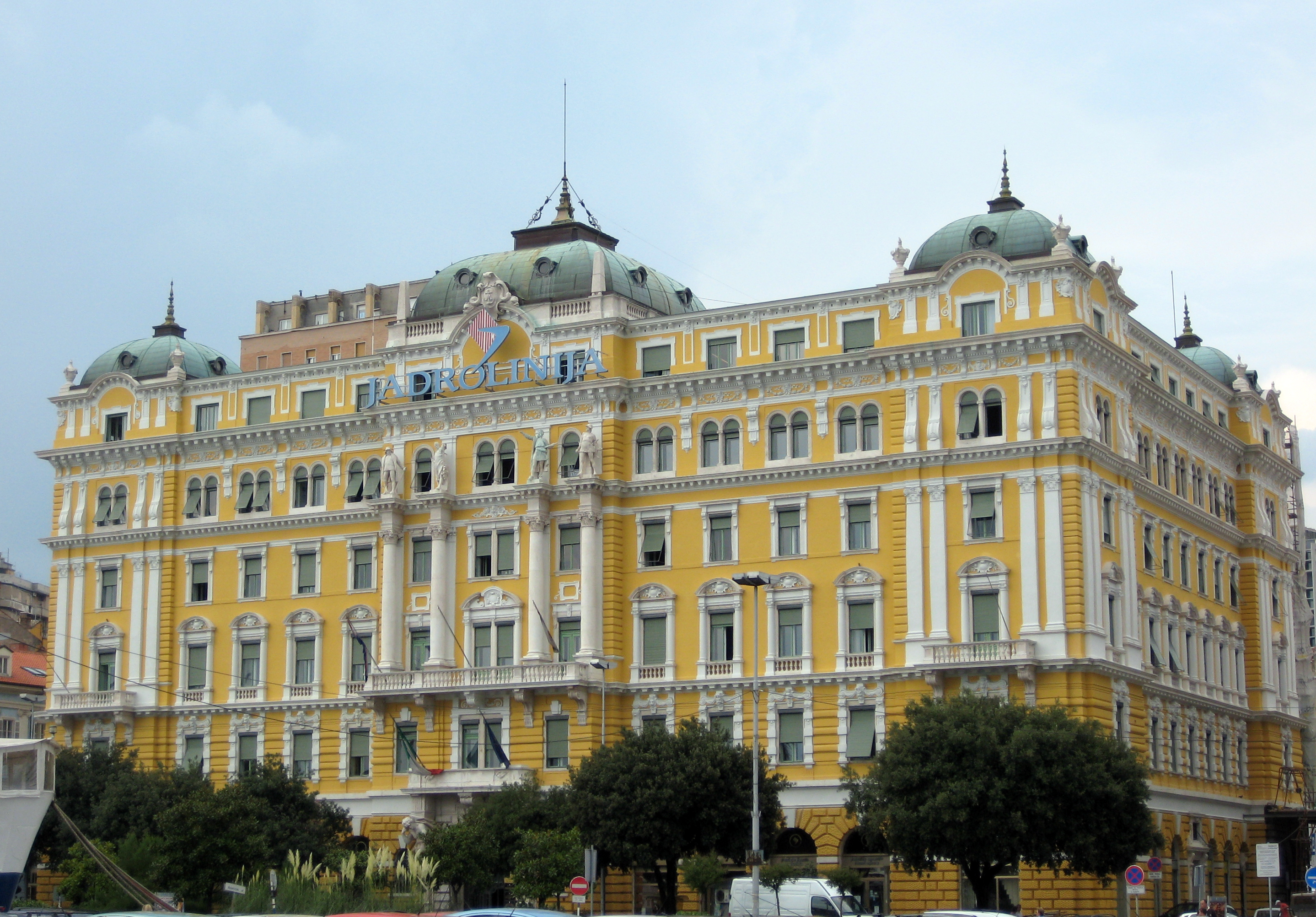
- Headquarters in Rijeka, Croatia
- Type: State-owned
- Industry: Shipping
- Founded: 1947
- Headquarters: Rijeka, Croatia
- Area served: Adriatic Sea
- Key people: Robert Blažinović (Chairman of the Board)
- Services: Ferry
- Operating income: ▲195.2 million EUR
- Net income: ▲9.7 million EUR
- Owner: Croatian Government
- Number of employees: 1,976
- Website: www.jadrolinija.hr

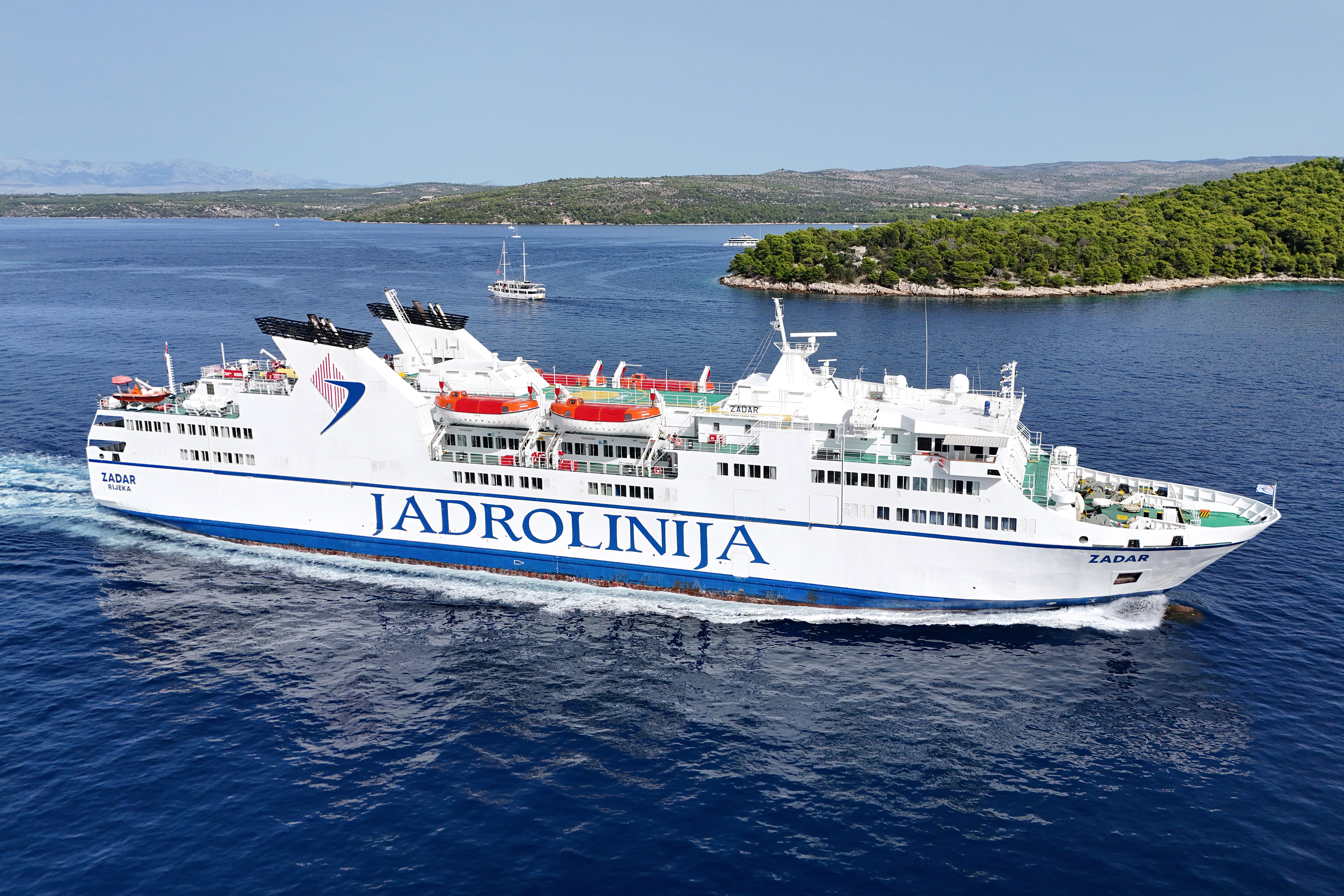
The Jadrolinija ferry Zadar near Milna, Croatia; 2024

Jadrolinija is a Croatian ferry company. It is state-owned and it primarily connects Croatian islands to the mainland by operating regular passenger and cargo transport services. The company mainly operates car ferries on domestic routes along the Croatian coast, as well as international routes across the Adriatic Sea to Italy (to ports at Ancona and Bari).

Jadrolinija currently operates a fleet of 54 vessel: it has several large car ferries; Dalmacija and Marko Polo are used on international routes, mostly to the Italian cities of Bari and Ancona. There are also 38 smaller ferries used for local passenger service, 12 catamarans, and four smaller passenger ships. The fleet's total carrying capacity is 4,708 vehicles and 32,364 passengers.

Jadrolinija was founded in Rijeka on 20 January 1947 as a continuation of various smaller shipping companies which had operated along the Croatian coast since 1872. In 2024, its ships carried 12,671,824 passengers and 3,756,957 vehicles.

== Projects ==
In January 2022, Minister Oleg Butković announced the procurement of six new ships, three passenger ships, two of which are hybrid-powered up to 45 meters in length and three catamarans. It is expected that two will be built in 2023. One of the ships should replace the MS Postira.

In November 2022, Jadrolinija announced a tender for the sale of MF Dubrovnik at a price of 2.85 million euros. The competition lasts until March 2023. The ship was eventually sold to the Greek company A-Ships.

In December 2022, Jadrolinija announced a tender for the purchase of a used ferry, between 100-110 m long, 17-19 m wide and 2.9 m draft, with a passenger capacity of at least 500 in winter and 700 in summer. The tender was canceled in May 2023, but was announced again in June 2023. At the opening of bids, only one bid worth 7.695 million euros was received, from Livadas Shipping Co. from Greece. On 13 July Jadrolinija accepted the offer and bought ship even after media writing about the unsuitability of the ship for navigation in the Adriatic. The ship was renamed as MF Sveti Duje after the Saint Domnius.

In January 2023, a tender was announced for the procurement of three new electrically powered passenger ships. The ships sail in the Dubrovnik area, on the line to the Elafites, in the Šibenik area, where they will maintain a connection with Prvić, Zlarin and other islands, and in the Lošinj archipelago, if necessary, use them on other lines as well. The approximate length of the ships should be about 45 to 50 meters, with a transport capacity of about 390 passengers. The planned value of each of the ships, according to unofficial announcements, is around EUR 15 million, with co-financing by EU funds in the amount of 65 percent of their total value. These ships should be built by the end of 2026 at the latest, and by then HEP, together with the competent port authorities, should provide adequate connections for charging their batteries in the ports where they will dock. This year, Jadrolinija intends to start the construction of a new ferry for the Zadar water area. The tender was eventually annulled as none of the contestants met the conditions, which led to publication of new tender for which the application deadline is 1 August. The builder for the second tender was chosen as Kraljevica Shipyard, with a full arrangement to be concluded and ships to be built until the end of 2026.

In April 2023, a tender was announced for the purchase of two catamarans, for which Jadrolinija is ready to pay up to 14 million euros without VAT. The condition for these ships is that they must be up to 5 years old, up to 40 meters long and up to 12 meters wide, each with a capacity of at least 300 passengers, and intended for international routes on the Adriatic Sea. Offers for these fast passenger ships are accepted until May 3rd 2023. On 15 July 2023 Jadrolinija presented HSC Danica and HSC Kata as new catamarans bought from TP line for 13.4 million euros without VAT.

In August 2023, the state shipowner announced a public procurement worth 18.3 million euros, according to which the ships must not be older than two years. The technical specifications, among other things, foresee a length of 40 meters, a width of 12 meters, a minimum speed of 27 knots and a capacity of a minimum of 300 passengers, and the material of manufacture must be aluminum. The ships must be delivered no later than the last day of June 2024, and the offer deadline is September 26, 2023.

On 20 February 2024, Jadrolinija put MS Unije (ex Panagia Εvaggelistria) in service on line Mali Lošinj – Unije – Vele Srakane – Susak. The ship was bought for 2 million euros in April 2023 from Star Gem Maritime Company located in Greece.

In November 2025, the company announced that it was raising a loan of 280 million euros for the construction of approximately ten new ships that will be in line with the European policy of “green transition”, i.e. they will be powered by alternative fuels rather than diesel. A mandate letter has been signed with the World Bank and the International Finance Corporation and it plans to sign a loan agreement with them in March or April 2026 to finance the construction of up to ten new ships, most of which will be ferries and three to four passenger ships. “Green transition” means ships with engines powered by alternative fuels – biodiesel, green methanol or electric propulsion. The first newly built ships are planned to enter the Jadrolinija fleet in late 2027 or in the first quarter of 2028.

== Ships ==
List of ships - updated on 20 September 2025

=== Ferries ===
Ship	Built	Entered service	LOA (m)	Beam (m)	Draught (m)	Max speed (knot)	Passenger capacity	Capacity of cars
MF Bartol Kašić	1989	1989	64.8	13.8	3.2	13.0	500	44
MF Biokovo	2009	2009	87.6	17.5	2.4	13.0	1,200	138
MF Bol	2005	2008	95.4	20.0	2.3	11.5	600	176
MF Brač	2014	2014	99.8	17.5	2.4	12.5	616	145
MF Cres	2005	2005	87.6	17.5	2.4	11.5	600	100
MF Dalmacija	1993	2024	134.4	24.0	5.2	17.0	1,800	350
MF Faros	2010	2020	105.0	17.5	2.7	14.0	650	170
MF Hanibal Lucić	1993	1994	49.9	12.8	3.1	12.5	360	35
MF Hrvat	2007	2007	87.6	17.5	2.4	13.0	1,200	138
MF Ilovik	2006	2007	95.8	7.5	2.8	12.0	500	170
MF Jadran	2010	2010	87.6	17.5	2.4	13.0	1,200	138
MF Juraj Dalmatinac	2007	2007	87.6	17.5	2.4	13.0	1,200	138
MF Kijevo	1997	1997	41.2	16.0	2.4	9.5	150	36
MF Korčula	2007	2008	101.4	17.3	3.5	16.0	685	150
MF Kornati	2014	2014	99.8	17.5	2.4	12.5	616	145
MF Krk	2014	2014	99.8	17.5	2.4	12.5	616	145
MF Laslovo	1997	1997	41.2	16.0	2.4	9.5	150	36
MF Lastovo	1969	1978	72.7	13.7	3.7	14.0	482	60
MF Lošinj	2010	2021	97.9	16.0		13.0	600	140
MF Lošinjanka	1969	1969	48.0	10.8	1.8	10.8	200	30
MF Marjan	2005	2005	87.6	17.5	2.4	12.3	1,200	130
MF Marko Polo	1972	1988	128.1	19.6	5.7	19.5	1,100	270
MF Mate Balota	1988	1988	64.7	13.4	2.9	11.0	440	50
MF Mljet	2014	2014	99.8	17.5	2.4	12.5	616	145
MF Oliver	1997	2024	108	17.5	4.1	18	680	100
MF Otok Pašman	2003	2021	42.0	15.3			250	35
MF Pelješčanka	1971	1971	48.0	10.8	2.2	11.5	209	30
MF Petar Hektorović	1989	1999	91.8	18.0	3.8	15.5	1,080	120
MF Sis	1974	1997	73.8	16.4	2.5	10.5	700	70
MF Ston	1997	1997	41.2	16.0	2.4	9.5	150	31
MF Supetar	2004	2004	87.6	17.5	2.4	11.5	594	100
MF Sveti Duje	2017	2024	107.0	18.0	2.8	14.5	1,000	244
MF Sveti Juraj	1980	1991	49.9	12.8	3.2	11.0	300	45
MF Sveti Krševan	2004	2004	87.6	17.5	2.4	11.5	600	100
MF Šoltanka	1971	1971	48.0	10.8	2.4	11.5	200	30
MF Tin Ujević	2002	2003	98.3	17.0	2.7	14.0	1,000	200
MF Ugljan	2011	2020	102.2	18.0	2.7	11.0	650	114
MF Valun	1983	1998	81.2	15.1	3.4	13.0	730	60
MF Vladimir Nazor	1986	1986	87.5	14.0	3.0	12.5	450	70
MF Zadar	1993	2004	116.0	18.9	5.2	17.5	1,053	280

=== Catamarans ===
Ship	Built	Entered service	LOA (m)	Beam (m)	Draught (m)	Max speed (knot)	Passenger capacity
HSC Adriana	1990	1998	40.0	10.1	1.3	36.0	356
HSC Cvijeta	2023	2025	38.0	10.0			312
HSC Danica	2019	2023	39.0	10.0	1.3	29.0	317
HSC Dora	1985	2015	41.9	7.6		28.0	350
HSC Dubravka	1991	2001	41.6	11.0	1.4	32.0	306
HSC Jelena	2018	2018	42.2	11.6	1.6	40.0	403
HSC Judita	1990	2001	41.6	11.0	1.4	32.0	316
HSC Karolina	1989	2004	41.6	11.0	1.2	34.0	316
HSC Kata	2019	2023	39.0	10.0	1.3	29.0	317
HSC Mila	2025	2025	36.5				
HSC Novalja	1991	2004	41.6	11.0	1.2	34.0	316
HSC Olea	1981	1991	29.0	9.0	1.3	26.0	218
HSC Ružica	2023	2025	38.0	10.0			312
HSC Silba	1990	1998	36.5	9.8	1.2	36.0	310

=== Conventional ships ===
Ship	Built	Entered service	LOA (m)	Beam (m)	Draught (m)	Max speed (knot)	Passenger capacity
MS Lara	1988	1991	37.6	6.3	1.7	12.0	250
MS Postira	1963	1963	44.6	8.1	2.9	14.0	380
MS Premuda	1957	1957	44.7	8.2	2.8	13.0	450
MS Unije	2004	2024	46.9	9.0	3.0	11.8	208

== Former ships ==
- MF Brestova - built in 1985, sold in 2025 tu unknown international buyer.
- MF Dubrovnik - built in 1979, sold to A-Ships from Greece in 2023
- MF Liburnija - built in 1965, sold for scrap in 2015.
- MF Lubenice - built in 1989, sold for scrap to Turkey in 2022
- MS Perast - built in 1963, attacked by JNA forces in 1991, retired in the same year, and scrapped in 2004.
- MF Prizna - built in 1970, sold to Morsko dobro from Montenegro in 2023
- MS Tijat - built in 1955, retired in 2023
- HSC Vida - built in 2011, sold in 2025.

== Gallery ==
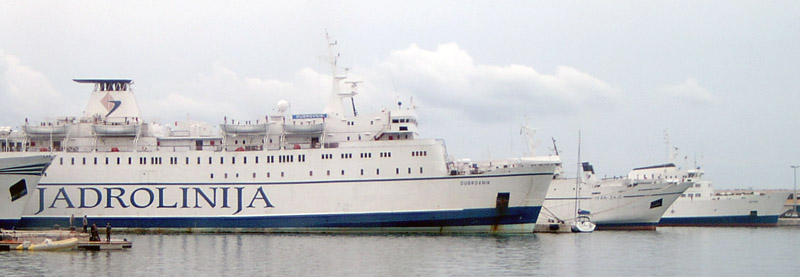
The Jadrolinija former ferries MF Dubrovnik (sold), MF Ivan Zajc (sold) and MF Istra (scrapped) on dock in Split harbour

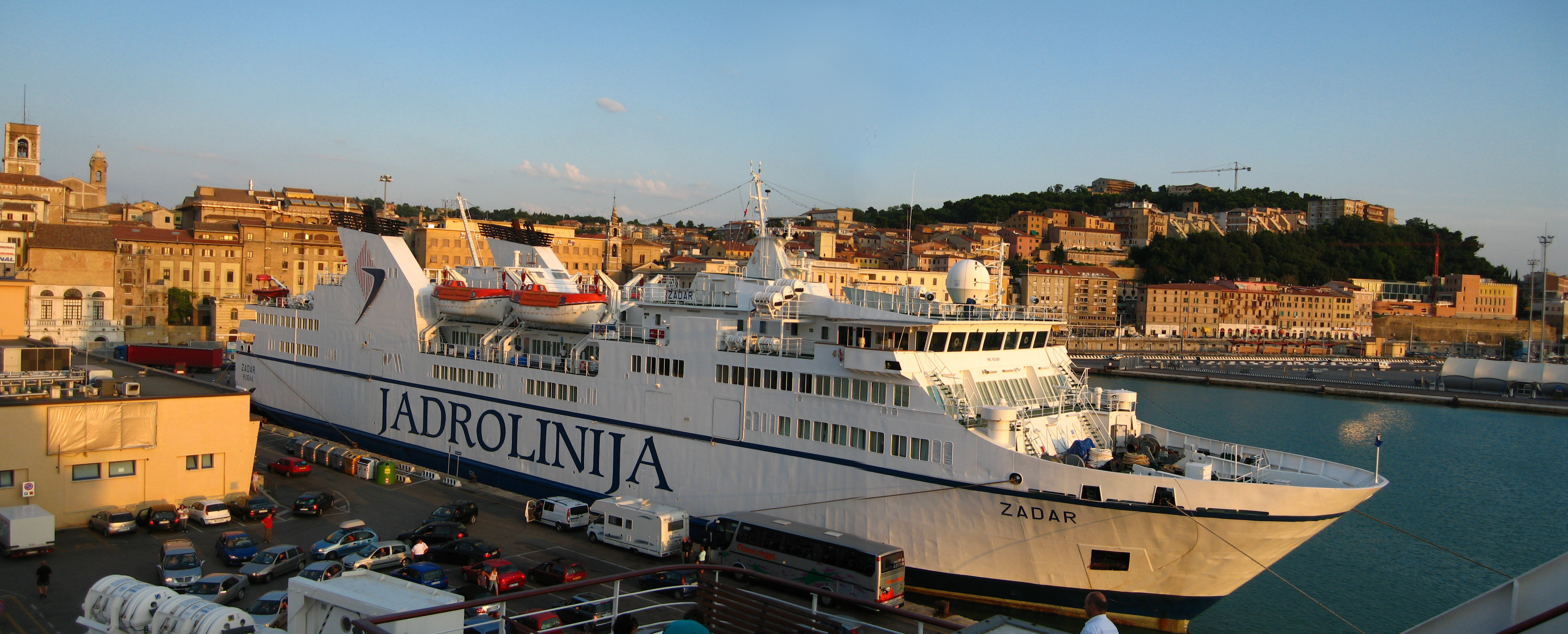
The Jadrolinija ferry MF Zadar in Ancona harbour

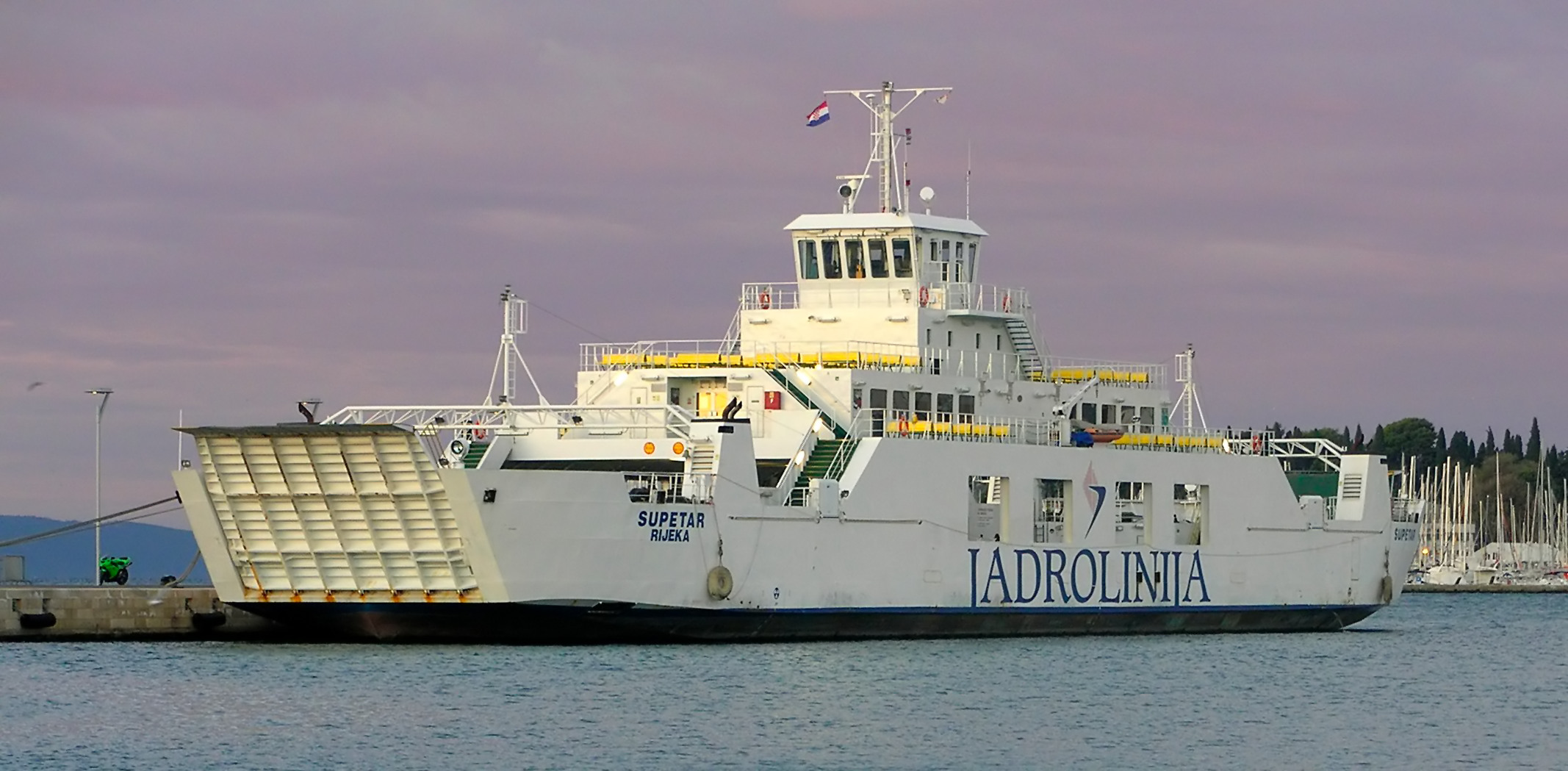
The Jadrolinija ferry MF Supetar in Split harbour

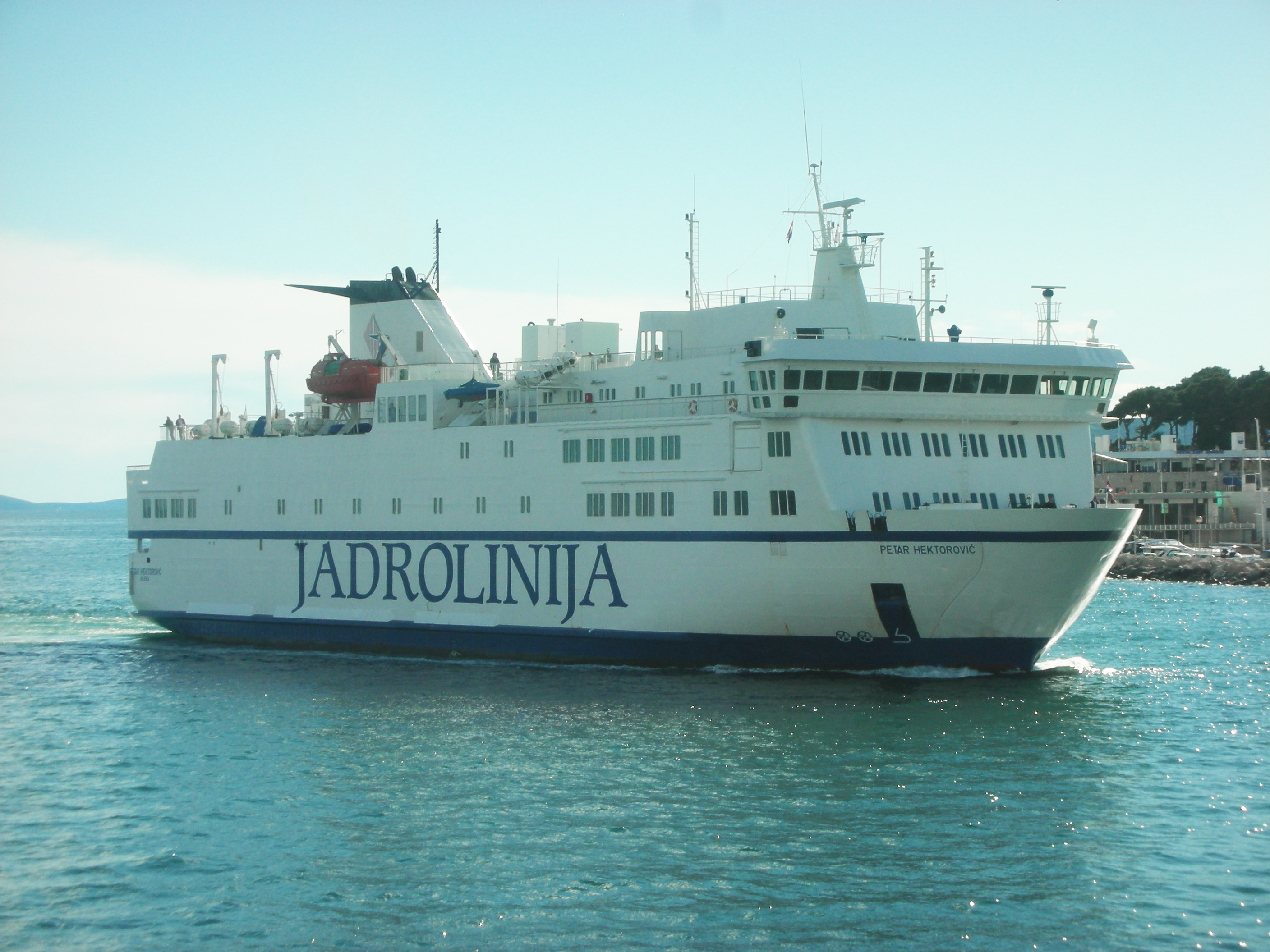
The Jadrolinija ferry MF Petar Hektorović entering Split harbour

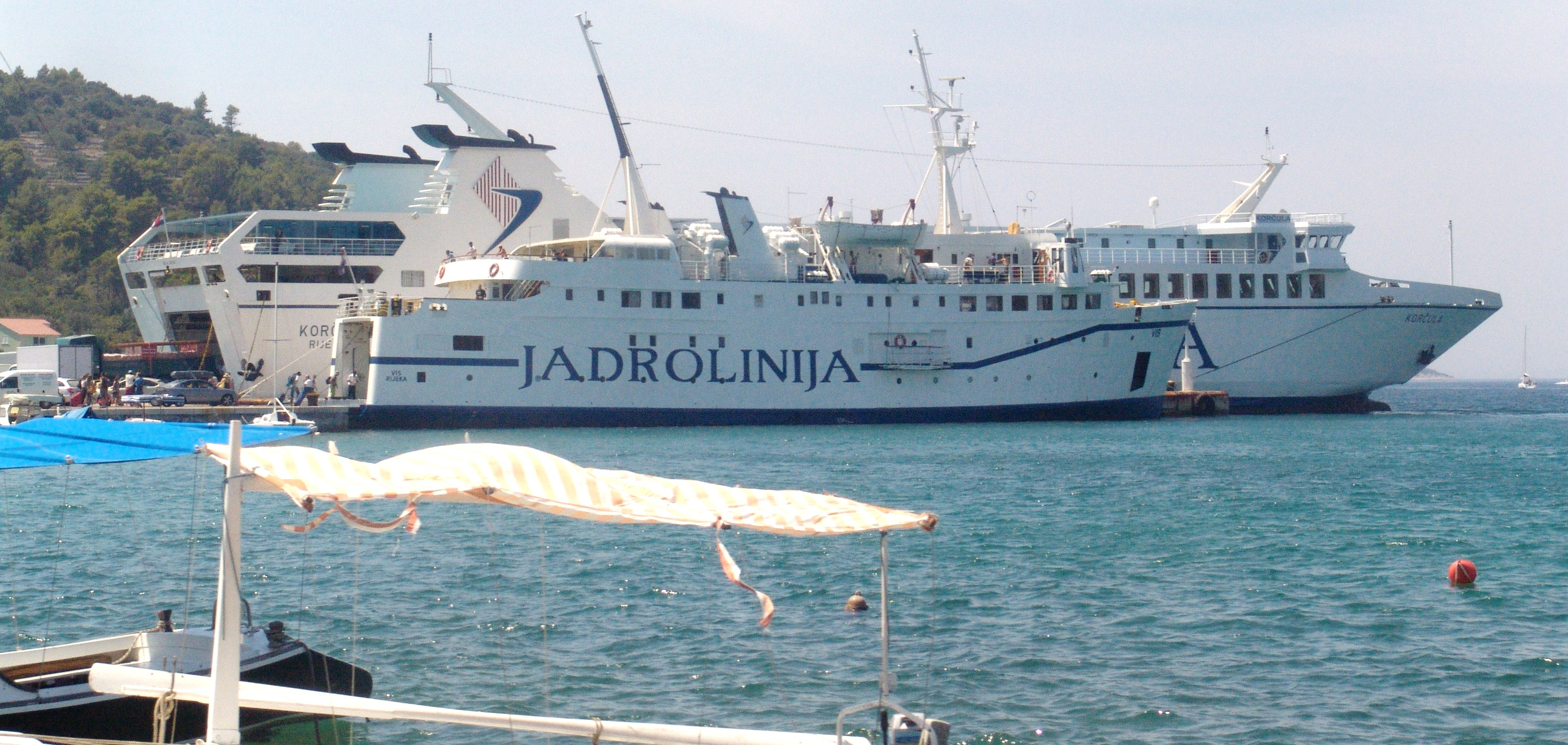
The Jadrolinija ferries MF Vis & MF Korcula in Vela Luka

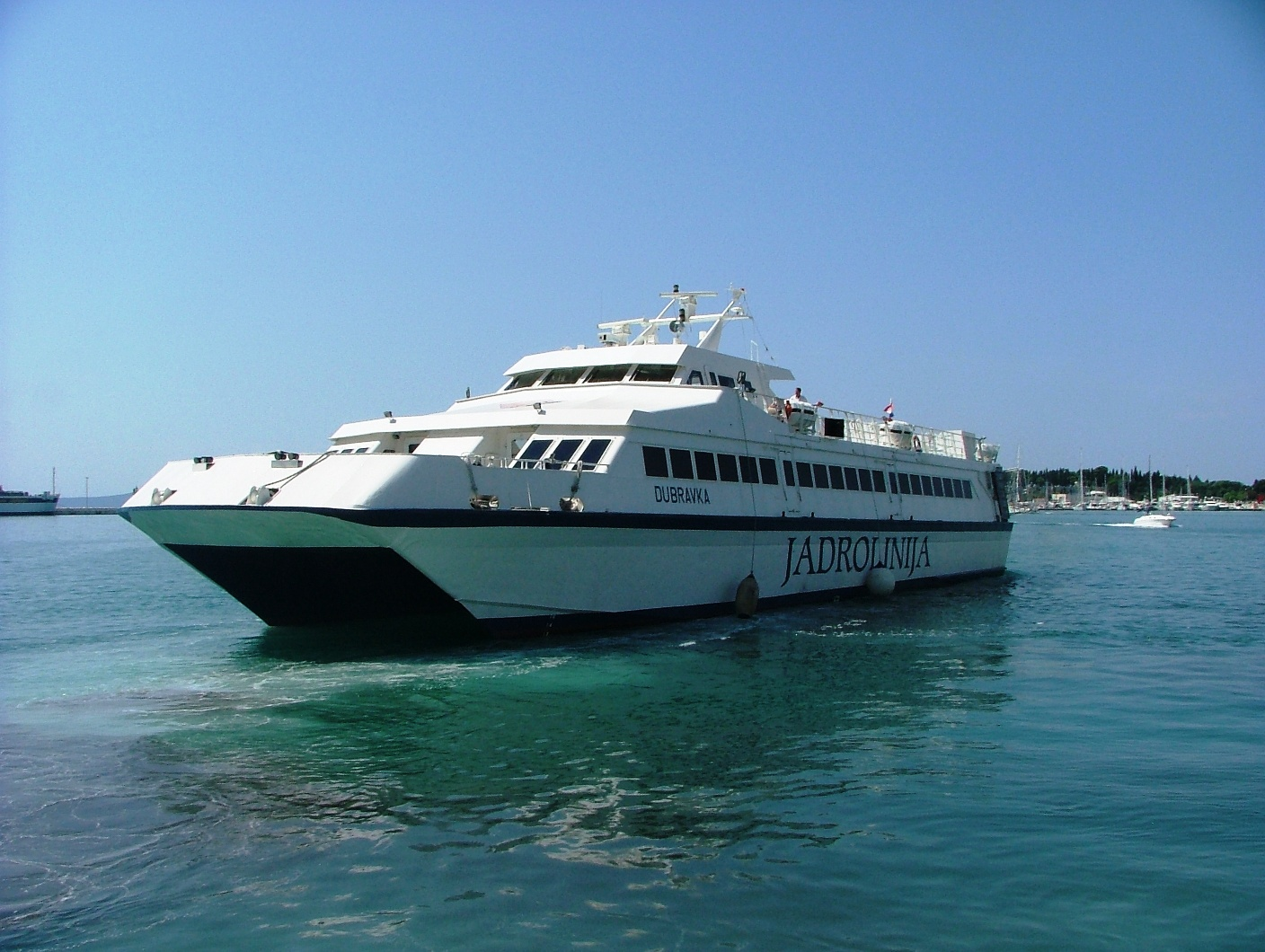
The Jadrolinija high speed ship HSC Dubravka
