= HSC Judita =

Catamaran passenger ship

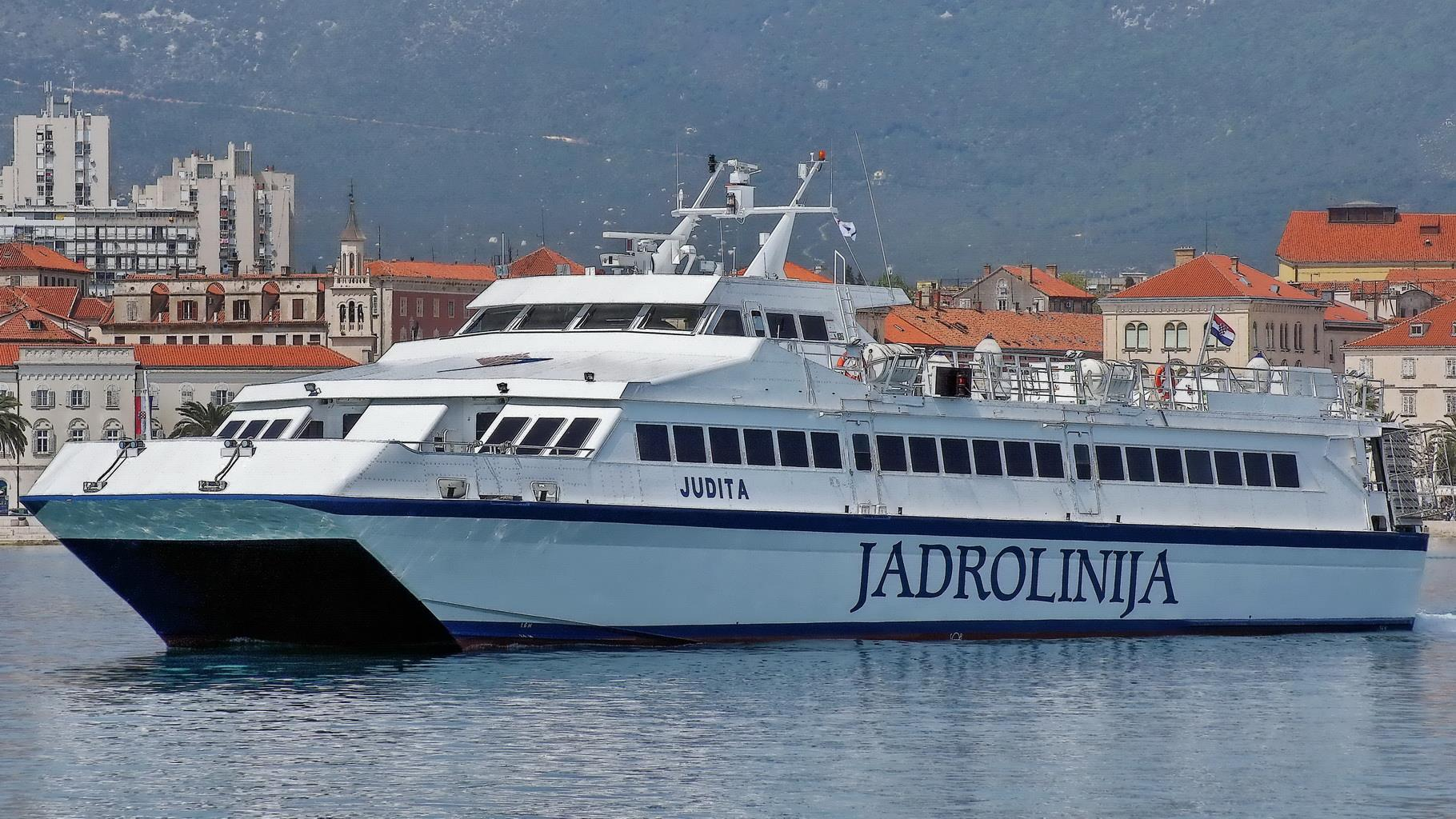
- Judita in Split harbour

History

Croatia
- Name: Lusitano (1990-1996); Supercat 5 (1996-2001); Judita (2001 onwards)
- Owner: Supercat Fast Ferry Corporation (1996-2001); Jadrolinija (2001 onwards)
- Port of registry: Rijeka; Croatia
- Route: Korčula - (Prigradica) - Hvar - Split
- Builder: FBM Marinteknik (S) Pte. Ltd.; Singapore
- Yard number: 121
- Launched: 1990
- Homeport: Split; Croatia
- Identification: IMO number: 9005778
- Status: Ship in service

General characteristics
- Type: High speed passenger craft
- Tonnage: 458 GT
- Length: Loa 41.57 m
- Beam: 11 m
- Draught: 1.194 m
- Installed power: 3880 kW
- Speed: 36 kn

HSC Judita is a high speed catamaran passenger ship owned by Croatian shipping company Jadrolinija.

Sisterships: Dubravka, Karolina, Novalja.

== See also ==
Supercat Fast Ferry Corporation
