= MF Hrvat =

Ferry owned by shipping company Jadrolinija

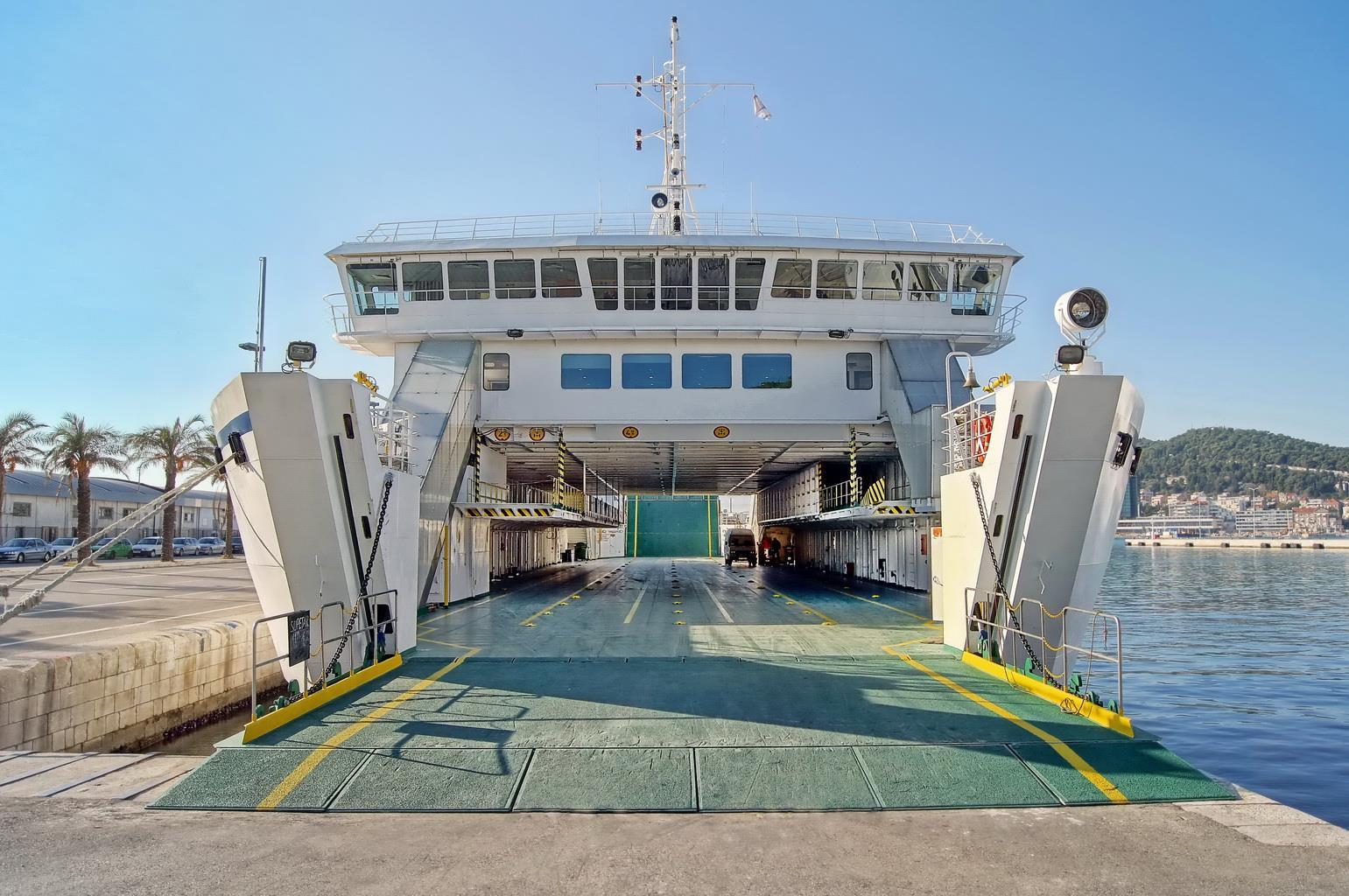
- Hrvat in Split harbor

History

Croatia
- Name: Hrvat (2006 onwards)
- Owner: Jadrolinija
- Port of registry: Rijeka; Croatia
- Route: Split–Supetar
- Builder: Kraljevica Shipyard; Croatia
- Cost: € 8.75 million
- Yard number: No. 545
- Laid down: 2006
- Launched: 1 March 2007
- Homeport: Split; Croatia
- Identification: IMO number: 9415181
- Status: Ship in service

General characteristics
- Type: Ro-Ro passenger ship
- Tonnage: GT 3193
- Length: LOA 87.6 m
- Beam: 17.5 m
- Draught: 2.400 m
- Installed power: 2148 kW
- Propulsion: Internal combustion engine; CATERPILLAR 3412 E DITA; Griffin, Georgia, 2006; 4 propellers with controllable pitch
- Speed: 13 kn

MF Hrvat is a ferry owned by Croatian shipping company Jadrolinija with the capacity of 1200 passengers and 138 cars. The ship was built in Kraljevica Shipyard in Croatia and named after an old Croatian steamer from the 1900s. Hrvat operates on the route Split–Supetar. The passenger spaces of the ship are air-conditioned. The equipment includes hydraulic ramps and escalators.

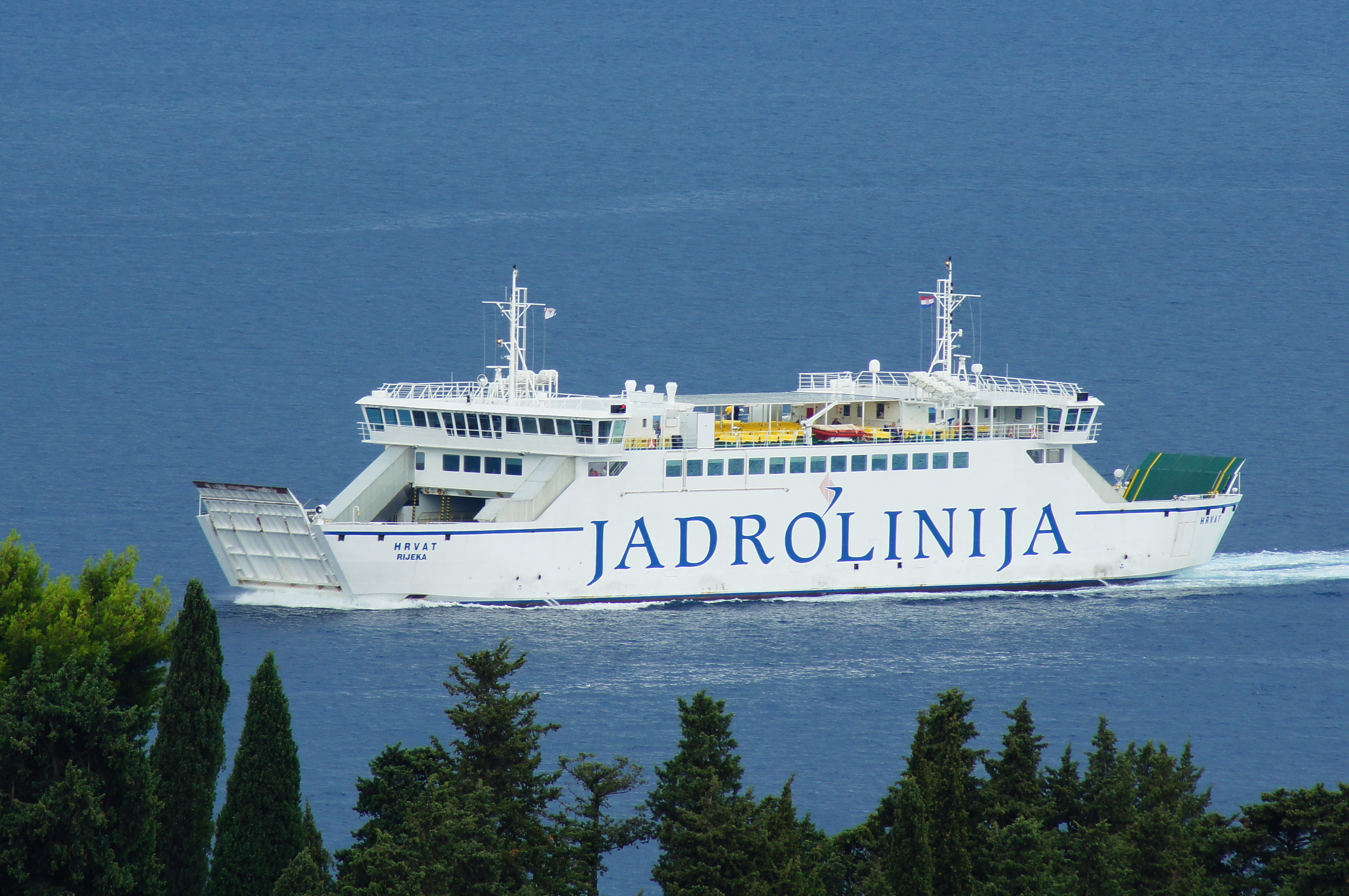
Hrvat arrives to Split
