= D119 road =

Road in Croatia

D119 state road

Route information
- Length: 9.5 km (5.9 mi)

Major junctions
- From: Lastovo ferry port
- To: Ubli

Location
- Country: Croatia
- Counties: Dubrovnik-Neretva
- Major cities: Lastovo

Highway system
- Highways in Croatia

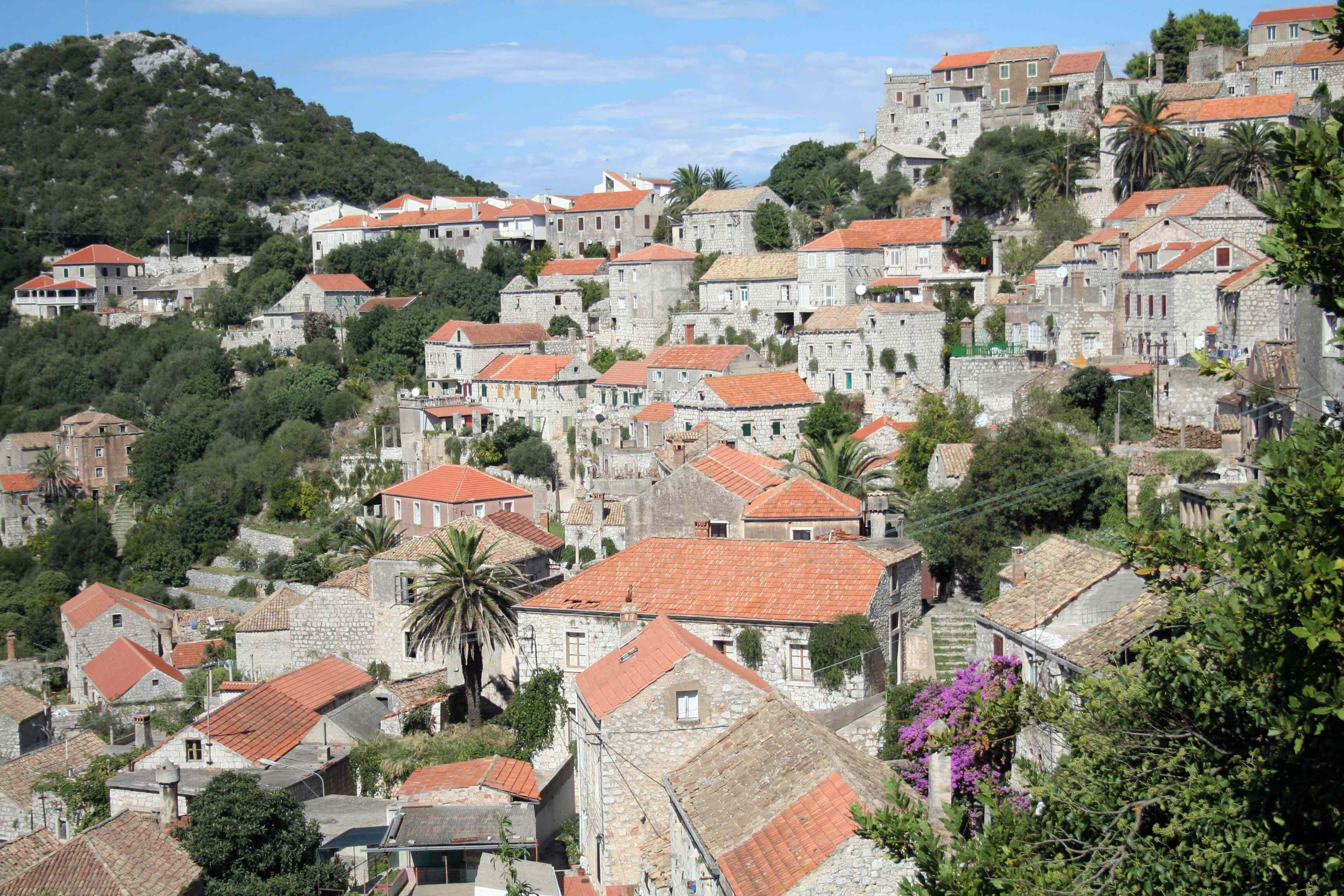
Lastovo, at the eastern terminus the D119 road

D119 is the main state road on the island of Lastovo in Croatia, connecting the towns of Ubli and Lastovo to a ferry port in Lastovo, from where Jadrolinija ferries fly to the mainland, docking in Split and the D410 state road. The road is 9.5 km (5.9 mi) long.

The road, as well as all other state roads in Croatia, is managed and maintained by Hrvatske ceste, a state-owned company.

== Road junctions and populated areas ==
D119 junctions/populated areas
Type	Slip roads/Notes
	Lastovo ferry port – access to the mainland port of Split (by Jadrolinija) and D410 to Split and A1 motorway Dugopolje interchange. The eastern terminus of the road.
	Lastovo; L69035 to Skrivena Luka. L69064 to Lučica.
	L69034 to Zaklopatica.
	Ubli; Ž6230 to Pasadur. The western terminus of the road.
