= Raid on Mljet =

- Part of World War II in Yugoslavia
Date	19–25 April 1944
Location	Mljet
Result	Partisan victory

Belligerents
Germany	Partisans

Commanders and leaders
(Nazi Germany) Unknown	(Yugoslav Partisans) Ante Biočić; (Yugoslav Partisans) Milan Atlagić; (Yugoslav Partisans) Bogdan Pecotić

Units involved
118th Division; 750th Regiment; 2nd Battalion; one or two companies	26th Division; 1st Brigade; 3rd Battalion; 11th Brigade; 1st Battalion; 2nd Battalion; Mortar Company

Strength
c. 200 troops (initially); 2 aircraft 2 torpedo boats	c. 900 troops 16 vessels

Casualties and losses
96 killed 46 captured 1 aircraft damaged	25 killed 76 wounded 1 armed ship scuttled

The raid on Mljet (Serbo-Croatian: Desantni prepad na Mljet) was an amphibious raid carried out by the Yugoslav Partisans in April 1944 against the German garrison on the Dalmatian island of Mljet. Occupied by Italian Forces during the Invasion of Yugoslavia in April 1941, the island briefly came under Partisan control following the Armistice of Cassibile in September 1943. It was soon captured by German Forces during their anti-Partisan operations aimed at securing the coastal areas of Yugoslavia previously occupied by the Italians. By early 1944, almost all of the Dalmatian islands were under German control, the exception being Vis which soon became a Partisans stronghold from which the Partisans and Allied Commandos would begin launching raids against German island garrisons.

The raid on Mljet was planned as a diversionary attack with the goal of confusing and tying-up German Forces while the Partisans conducted a much larger raid against the Germans on Korčula. The Partisan plan was to land three battalions of the 1st and 11th Brigades on two locations on the south of Mljet one day before the raid on Korčula would commence. A significant obstacle for the Partisans was the lack of appropriate vessels to transport the raiding party. With Allied Forces declining to take part in the raid, the Partisans would carry-on using motor-powered sailboats and small galleys escorted by two armed ships, both of which were in fact lightly armed civilian vessels. Because the distance from Vis to Mljet is 64 nautical miles (119 kilometres) and the Partisan ships were unable to attain a speed greater than 4–5 knots (7.4–9.3 km/h; 4.6–5.8 mph), it was impossible for them to reach Mljet in a single night and conduct the transport by sea under the cover of darkness. Instead, it was decided to carry it out in two legs: first by departing for Lastovo during the first night and continuing to Mljet during the second night.

The raiding party departed Vis on 19 April 1944 with 16 vessels organized in two convoys. They reached Skrivena Luka on Lastovo at 05:30 of 20 April after which the troops disembarked and the ships were camouflaged along the cove. The convoys departed Lastovo during the second night, reaching Mljet shortly after midnight of 21 April. At 06:00, the Partisans engaged German Forces which consisted of one or two companies numbering around 200 men. The Partisans were successful in overrunning the German positions, though one was soon counterattacked and retaken by the Germans. Two companies of German reinforcements arrived during the night of 21/22 April but didn't engage in major actions. With their goals largely achieved, the Partisans retreated to the Sutmiholjska cove where they boarded their ships and departed for Lastovo during the night of 22/23 April.

Although the German garrison wasn't completely destroyed, the Partisans were successful in inflicting heavy casualties and diverting three companies of their reserves to Mljet. During the night of 22 April, the Partisans began their main effort on Korčula by landing six battalions on the island. The raid proved to be highly successful, with German Forces suffering hundreds of killed and captured in action and losing large amounts of materiel.

== Background ==
Following the Axis Invasion of Yugoslavia in April 1941, Dalmatia was partitioned between the Kingdom of Italy and the newly established Axis puppet state of Independent State of Croatia (Croatian: Nezavisna država Hrvatska – NDH). In accordance with the treaties of Rome signed on 18 May 1941, Split, Šibenik, Ravni Kotari and all of the Dalmatian islands excluding Brač and Hvar were annexed by the Kingdom of Italy. The Italian surrender in September 1943 gave way to a large scale Partisan uprising in Dalmatia; The Partisans were successful in taking control of most of Dalmatia and all of its islands, capturing large amounts of materiel of the Royal Italian Army in the process. Meanwhile, faced with the possibility of an Allied amphibious landing along the eastern Adriatic, the Germans quickly began repositioning their forces with the goal of securing the areas previously held by the Italian Forces. The 114th Jäger Division was tasked with capturing northern Dalmatia while the 7th SS Volunteer Mountain Division Prinz Eugen was tasked with capturing central Dalmatia and its islands. By early September, German Forces secured Knin continuing their advance towards Drniš, Zadar an Šibenik, securing all three with no resistance by the surrendering Italian Forces. Heavy fighting between German and Partisan Forces would erupt on the approaches to Split, a significant administrative and political center of Dalmatia also housing one of the largest Italian garrisons in Dalmatia. German Forces finally captured Split on 27 September. Despite German advances, with an influx of thousands of new fighters and captured materiel in the aftermath of the Italian surrender, the Partisans were able to create nine Dalmatian-based brigades, culminating in the creation of the 8th Corps on 7 October 1943.

Following the occupation of Split, German Forces launched operation Operation Herbstgewitter with the goal of securing the remaining coastline and the islands. The first phase of the operation commenced on 23 October with German landings on Pelješac. After twelve days of fighting and suffering over 250 killed, wounded or missing, the Partisans retreated to Podgora and Korčula. German Forces continued their advance and on 22 December began their assault on Partisan-held Korčula. In three days of the ensuing fighting, the Partisans suffered heavy casualties before retreating to Hvar and Vis; of the 1057 fighters of the 13th Brigade, only 525 were evacuated from Korčula while the 1st Overseas Brigade suffered 300 killed, wounded or missing. The final leg of Operation Herbstgewitter commenced on 31 December with German Forces landing on Mljet. The island was captured without resistance as the elements of the 13th Brigade and the Orjen Partisan Detachment which were located on the island were evacuated to Vis beforehand.

Following the German occupation of Korčula and facing an enemy which possessed technical and numerical superiority, the Partisans decided to abandon the defense of Brač, Hvar and Šolta and concentrate their defensive efforts on Vis. Vis was heavily fortified and defended by the 26th Division, the Partisan Navy and Allied assets, becoming a central line of communication to Allied Forces in Italy and a staging ground for future efforts of disrupting German coastal defences. Beginning in early 1944, Partisan and Allied Forces began carrying out amphibious raids against German island garrisons. Both Partisan and Allied Forces carried out several small-scale raids on German positions on Hvar. Allied Commandos carried out a highly successful raid on Šolta on 18 March, followed by another combined Partisan-Allied raid on Hvar in late March.

== Prelude ==
The raid on Mljet was planned as a diversionary attack while the main effort was concentrated on German Forces on Korčula. The raid was planned to occur one day before the raid on Korčula, distracting the Germans and tying up their reserve forces. A major obstacle for the Partisans Forces was the lack of appropriate vessels to conduct the raid: the Partisans had just four armed ships at their disposal for convoy protection duties while the transport vessels were too slow (4–5 knots (7.4–9.3 km/h; 4.6–5.8 mph)) to traverse the 64 nautical miles (119 kilometres) between Vis and Mljet in a single night. After Allied Forces declined to provide vessels for convoy protection, the Partisans allocated two armed ships for each of the raids. It was further decided to depart Vis a day earlier and first reach Lastovo where the raiding party would wait for the next night before making their way to Mljet itself. Sailing only under the cover of darkness was deemed a necessity to ensure the safety of the convoy and to avoid detection by German reconnaissance aircraft. Prior to the raid, the 11th Brigade Headquarters dispatched intelligence officer Ante Bogdanić to survey to situation on Mljet. He was followed on 16 April by a group of Partisans led by the 26th Division Operations officer Captain Bogdan Pecotić tasked with preparing the landing sites. Partisan battalions taking part in the raid were commanded by the 11th Brigade Commander Captain Milan Atlagić. Once on Mljet, he would be joined by Pecotić who would help him with decision making. Chief of Staff of the 26th Division, lieutenant colonel Ante Biočić, was responsible for overseeing the Mljet raid and was positioned on Lastovo from which he would maintain radio communications with the 11th Brigade Headquarters.

=== Order of battle ===
German Forces on Mljet consisted of one or two companies of the 2nd battalion, 750th Regiment of the 118th Jäger Division, numbering around 200 men. The bulk of these forces was located on Hill 514 (Veliki Grad) and Hill 488 (Mali Grad) which were fortified and surrounded by barbed wire and minefields. Smaller detachments were spread between the port of Sobra, Hill 372 (Straževac) and Babino Polje while the Radulići village housed a gendarmerie station. Partisan Forces taking part in the raid consisted of the 1st and 2nd Battalions and a mortar company of the 11th Dalmatian Brigade and the 3rd Battalion of the 1st Dalmatian Brigade, numbering a total of around 900 men. Partisan naval forces consisted of several motor-powered sailboats, small galleys, the hospital ship Marin II (Note: Marin II was a motorboat converted to a hospital ship during January 1944 on Vis.) and two armed ships, the Enare II (NB-7) and Kornat (NB-8). (Note: Enare II was a 17 m (56 ft) pre-war passenger ship while the Kornat was a 19 m (62 ft) tuna fishing ship built in 1937.) Because the majority of these vessels lacked any kind of navigational aids and were sailing without any light signals, they were organized in two convoys, each led by a single armed ship.

Partisan Forces bound for Mljet per Pribilović (1988, p. 217)
	Western convoy	Eastern convoy
Ships	1 × armed ship; 1 × hospital ship; 3 × motor-powered sailboat; 5 × small galley	1 × armed ship; 2 × motor-powered sailboat; 3 × small galley
Embarked units	2 × reinforced battalions of the 11th Brigade	1 × battalion of the 1st Brigade
Landing location	Sutmiholjska cove	Cape Veliki Zaglavac

== Raid ==
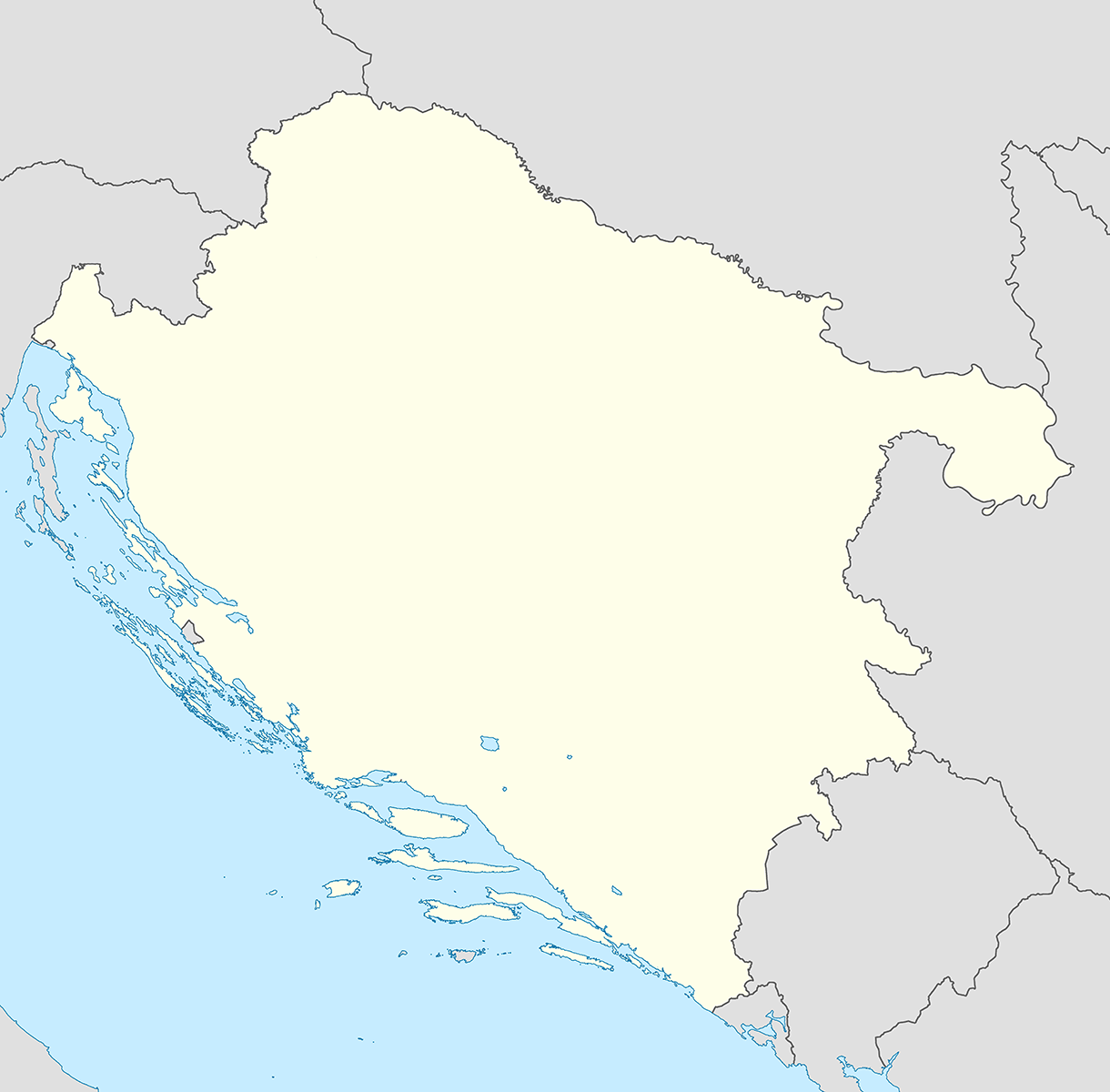
Map of the NDH following the Italian Armistice.

The western convoy departed Vis at 20:20 of 19 April, followed by the eastern convoy departing from the Rukavac cove on Vis at 21:30. The two convoys linked up at 22:10 and proceeded to sail to Lastovo with the eastern convoy leading the way. The raiding party reached Skrivena Luka on Lastovo at 05:30 of 20 April where the troops disembarked and the ships were spread out along a cove and camouflaged. At the 20:00, the Partisan Forces departed Lastovo bound for Mljet. The western convoy reached Sutmiholjska at 00:30 of 21 April, closely followed by the eastern convoy landing at Veliki Zaglavac at 01:15.

At 06:00, forward units of the western convoy approached the village of Radulići where they quickly neutralized a gendarmerie station, continuing towards Hill 514 while a smaller detachment proceeded through Babino Polje to link up with the eastern convoy's 3rd Battalion. At 06:30, the 3rd Battalion of the 1st Brigade under the command of Ilija Antunović began their assault on the port village of Sobra, clearing it of German Forces by 11:00. A platoon sent to assault a small German detachment on Hill 372 cleared it by 09:30. The 3rd Battalion was then directed to attack German Forces on Hill 488. The Partisans conducted three assaults on the hill, but were repelled each time.

Meanwhile, battalions of the 11th Brigade cleared Babino Polje and at 07:00 commenced their assault on Hill 514 supported by mortar fire. After successfully repelling four Partisan attacks, the German Forces were finally overrun by 18:00 after which parts of the 11th Brigade units joined with the 3rd Battalion in attacking Hill 488. A new assault commenced at 20:00 and resulted in German Forces being dislodged from their positions, thus clearing the last German position on Mljet. The Partisans chose not to pursue the retreating German Forces, giving them an opportunity to mount a successful counterattack, recapturing Hill 488 and forcing the 3rd Battalion to take up positions south and southwest of the hill. The 11th Brigade battalions left Hill 514 taking up positions west and southwest of it.

The Partisans were expected to retreat during the night of 21/22 April, however, strong winds and high waves prevented their ships from mooring safely in Sutmiholjska, posing a risk of them being broken up against the reefs. During the same night, the Germans landed two reinforced companies from Doli near Ston while the Kriegsmarine torpedo boats S-61 and S-33 en route from Pula to Kotor sailed south of Mljet but failed to observe any action. During 22 April, Partisan Forces conducted reconnaissance in several directions to determine if German Forces remaining on the island received reinforcements, and if not, continue with assaulting them. After being engaged by the reinforced German companies on Hill 514, the Partisans retreated to their main positions. The two sides exchanged fire during the day with neither of them engaging in major assaults. At 18:05, Partisan ships in Sutmiholjska were attacked with machine gun fire from two German aircraft. No casualties were sustained and the aircraft broke off their attack after facing return fire from Enare II and Kornat, damaging one of them.

The order to retreat from Mljet was given at 18:00 of 22 April with all Partisan units set to board their ships in Sutmiholjska, begging at 20:30. At 22:00, Kriegsmarine torpedo boats S-30 and S-61 sailing from the Bay of Kotor passed 3 kilometres (1.9 miles) from Mljet's southern shore, including Sutmiholjska, but failed to observe the Partisans boarding their ships despite good visibility. Boarding of the troops and the German prisoners of war was completed by 23:20. Manoeuvers in a narrow cove in the darkness caused Enare II and Kornat to collide, forcing the crew of Enare II to beach the ship to prevent it from sinking. Left unsalvageable, the ship was stripped of its weapons and set on fire to prevent it from being captured by the Germans. Faced with a delayed retreat and the loss of one of its armed ships, the order was given for the Partisan ships to make their way to Lastovo individually. The last ship to leave Mljet was Kornat which took on the crew of the Enare II, departing shortly after midnight of 23 April. The return to Lastovo proved to be troublesome. A galley towed by Kornat overturned but it's two-man crew was rescued. Kornat then began towing two motor-sailboats one of which was experiencing engine trouble and the second one being too slow to reach Lastovo before sunrise. The ships soon faced stronger bura winds and increasingly rough seas. At 02:30 the towline on one of the sailboats broke, leaving it to reach Lastovo on its own power. The same occurred at 03:00 to the towline of the second sailboat after which Kornat experienced a complete engine breakdown leaving it drifting on the sea. The Kornat was then towed by one of the sailboats, finally reaching Skrivena Luka on Lastovo at 06:15.

A third company of German reinforcements deployed to Mljet during the night of 22/23 April while the torpedo boats made another pass along the island's southern shore at 02:50, again to no avail as the last of the Partisan ships already left. Once on Lastovo, the wounded Partisans were evacuated to Vis during the same day while the rest of the troops remained on Lastovo as a reserve force for the ones fighting on Korčula. As the Korčula raid soon concluded, the troops finally departed Lastovo on 24 April reaching Vis at 06:35 of 25 April.

== Aftermath ==
The raid on Mljet was successful in diverting three companies of German reinforcements towards the island. The raid on Korčula commenced on 21/22 April with the landing of six Partisan battalions which engaged German Forces, inflicting 297 dead, taking 459 prisoners of war and capturing large amounts of materiel before retreating back to Vis. Huljić (1979) and Novović & Petković (1985) cite Partisan losses on Mljet at 25 killed and 76 wounded and German losses at 96 killed and 46 taken prisoner. Rako & Družijanić (1987) mention 22 Partisans killed in action, fifteen of which belonged to the 11th Brigade, and German losses as "over 100 killed, 64 taken prisoner and seven traitors (spies) apprehended". They further list captured materiel: two heavy mortars, eight light mortars, eight machine guns, 25 submachine guns, one radio set and large amounts of ammunition.

A memorial commemorating the raid was unveiled on Mljet on Navy Day 4 September 1966. Designed by Dubrovnik-based architecture student Toma Ivanišin, the memorial features a Partisan galley's bow facing the sea and a plaque reading:

Jedinice Jugoslavenske ratne mornarice i XXVI divizije NOVJ izvršile su 21. aprila 1944. godine prvi desant u južnom Jadranu u mljetskoj uvali Sutmiholjska i kod rta Zaglavac. Povodom 25-godišnjice Ustanka i Revolucije podiže 4. septembra 1966. – NAROD MLJETA.

[Units of the Yugoslav Navy and the XXVI. division of the NOVJ conducted the first raid in the southern Adriatic on 21 April 1944 in the Mljet cove of Sutmiholjska and near cape Zaglavac. On the occasion of the 25. anniversary of the uprising and revolution, erected on 4 September 1966. – THE PEOPLE OF MLJET.]

— in Brzica (1966, p. 251)

The Partisans would mount their next raid on 9 May against the Germans on Šolta. Following the defeats on Mljet and Korčula, the Germans made improvements to their island defenses: artillery coverage from the coast was improved, quick response troops were formed, additional landing craft were brought in from the northern Adriatic while their defensive positions were surrounded with multiple layers of barbed wire and land mines.
