= Mount Hum =

Mount Hum may refer to:

- Mount Hum (Vis) in southern Croatia
- Mount Hum (Plaški) in central Croatia
- Mount Hum (Sarajevo) in central Bosnia and Herzegovina
- Mount Hum (Mostar) in southern Bosnia and Herzegovina
- Mount Hum (Laško) in Slovenia
- Mount Hum (Pešter) in Montenegro and Serbia
- Mount Hum (Lastovo) in southern Croatia
