= Alvania dalmatica =

Scientific classification
- Kingdom: Animalia
- Phylum: Mollusca
- Class: Gastropoda
- Subclass: Caenogastropoda
- Order: Littorinimorpha
- Family: Rissoidae
- Genus: Alvania
- Species: A. dalmatica

Binomial name
- Alvania dalmatica Buzzurro & Prkic, 2007

Species of gastropod

Alvania dalmatica is a species of minute sea snail, a marine gastropod mollusc or micromollusc in the family Rissoidae.

== Distribution ==
This marine species occurs off Lastovo Island, Dalmatia, Croatia: also off Greece.
