= D119 =

D119 may refer to:

- D119 road (Croatia), a state road on island of Lastovo
- HMS Delight (D119), a British Royal Navy ship
- Jodel D.119, an aircraft
