= Poklad =

Poklad may refer to:

- Lastovo Poklad, an annual event on Lastovo Island, Croatia
- Ihor Poklad (1941–2025), Ukrainian composer
- Poklad (video game), 1984 Czech video game
