= Mrčara =

Island in Croatia

Geography
- Location: Adriatic Sea
- Coordinates: 42°46′08″N 16°47′22″E
- Archipelago: Lastovo
- Area: 1.45 km^{2} (0.56 sq mi)
- Highest elevation: 123 m (404 ft)

Administration
- Croatia
- County: Dubrovnik-Neretva County

Demographics
- Population: Uninhabited

Mrčara is a small uninhabited island in the Croatian part of the Adriatic Sea, located west of the islands of Prežba and Lastovo in southern Dalmatia. Its highest peak is 123 m above sea level and its coastline is 7.8 km long.

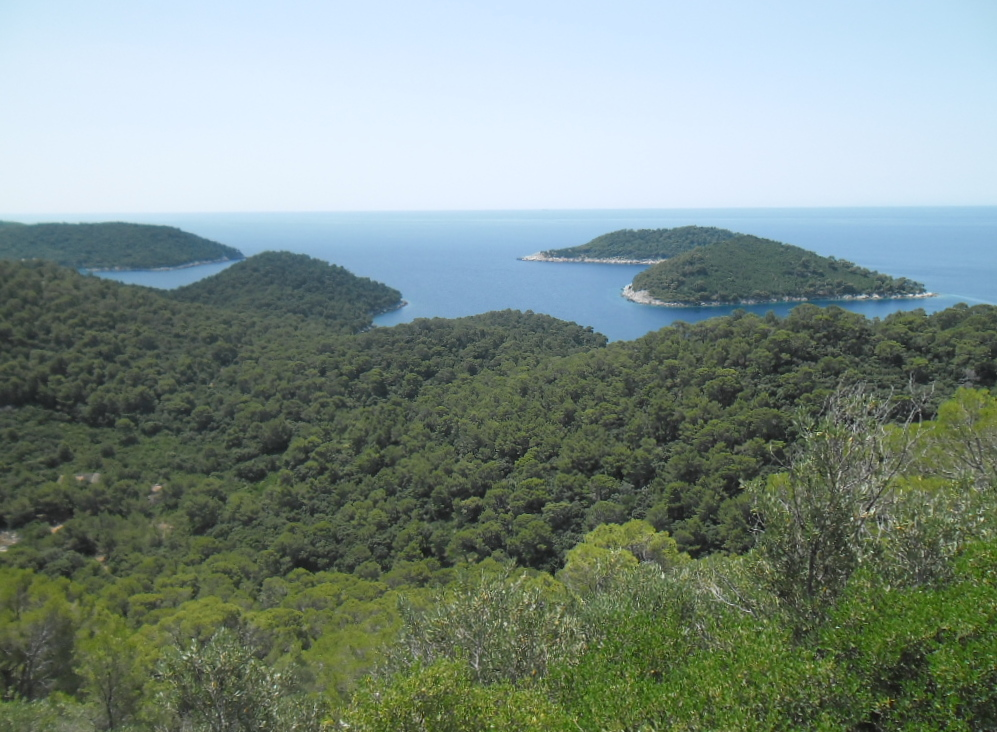
View on Mrčara from Prežba

A small jetty on the east coast of the island with a small seasonal restaurant services boat traffic.

In July 2011 the island hosted its first paintball game. Clear-shelled and filled paintballs were used so as not to leave any marks on the island's historical fortifications and tunnel complexes.

The island also hosts all weekend and all week Airsoft games as of July 2010.

== See also ==
- List of islands of Croatia
