= Prežba =

Island of Croatia

Geography
- Location: Adriatic Sea
- Coordinates: 42°46′20″N 16°48′34″E
- Archipelago: Lastovo
- Area: 2.81 km^{2} (1.08 sq mi)
- Highest elevation: 136 m (446 ft)

Administration
- Croatia
- County: Dubrovnik-Neretva County

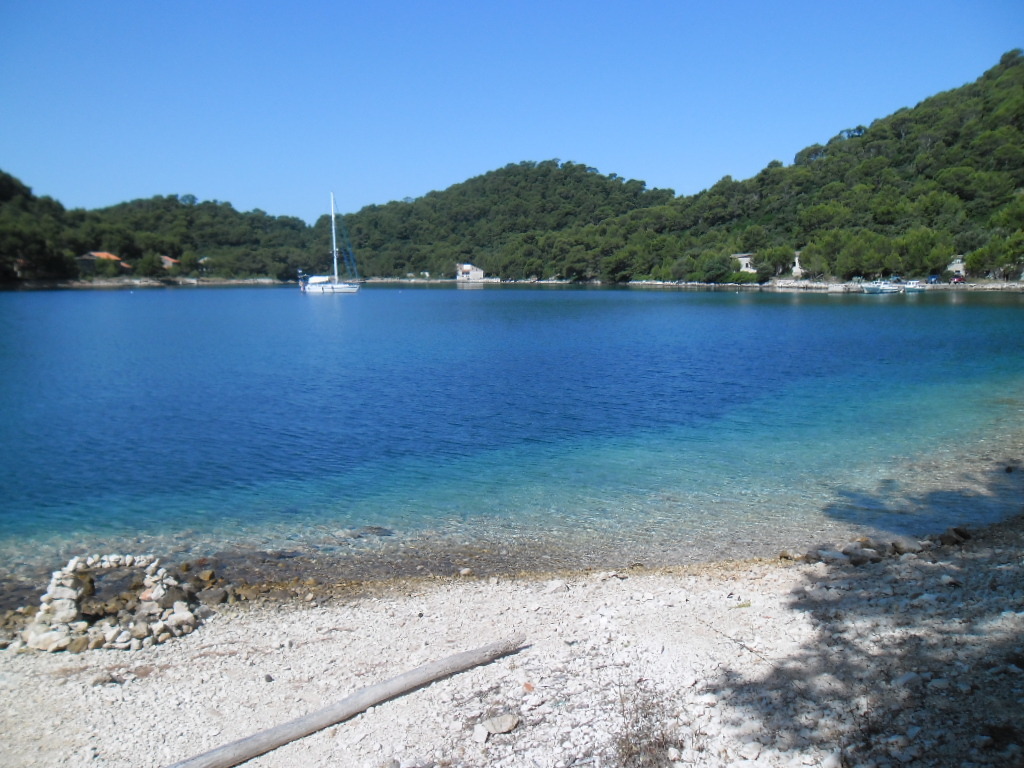
Prežba

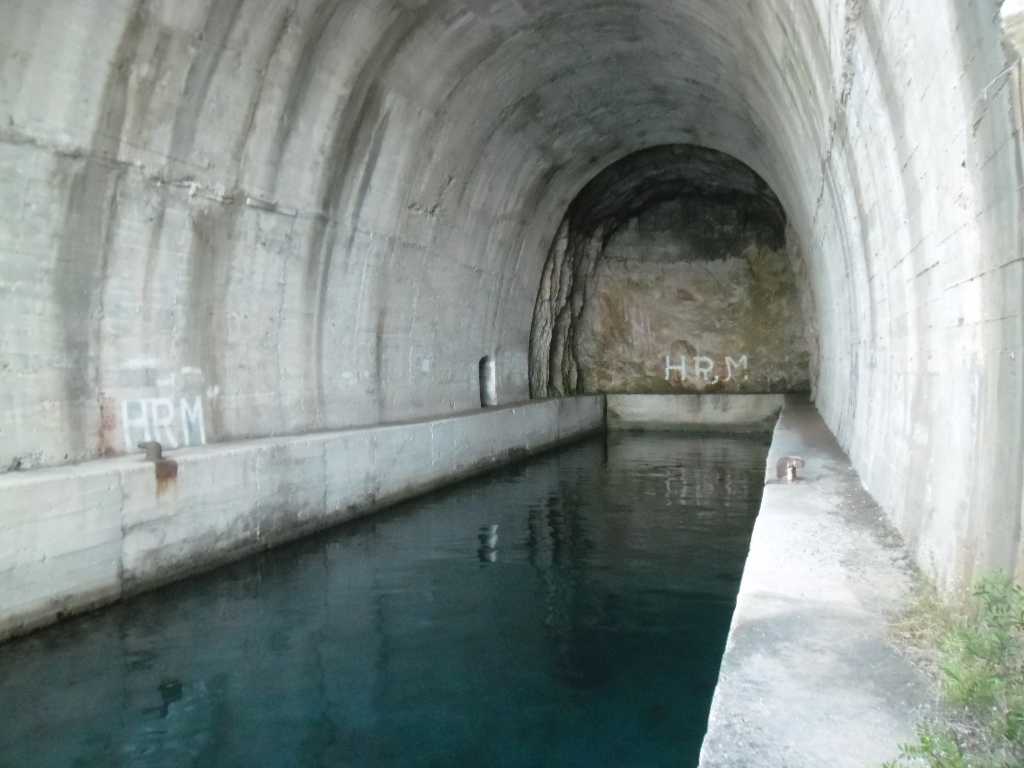
Navy military object on Prežba

Prežba is a small inhabited island in the Croatian part of the Adriatic Sea, located northwest of the island of Lastovo in southern Dalmatia. It is connected to Lastovo by a bridge at the village of Pasadur on Lastovo. Prežba's area is 2.81 km^{2}, but its coastline is 14.23 km long, due to the large number of coves on the island. Its highest peak is 136 m above sea level and there is a lighthouse on the south side of the island, across the bay from Ubli. The island was used by the Yugoslav People's Army as a military base containing a tunnel and tunnel for ships.

== See also ==
- List of islands of Croatia
