= Lastovo, Dubrovnik-Neretva County =

Lastovo
- Municipality
- Općina Lastovo; Lastovo Municipality
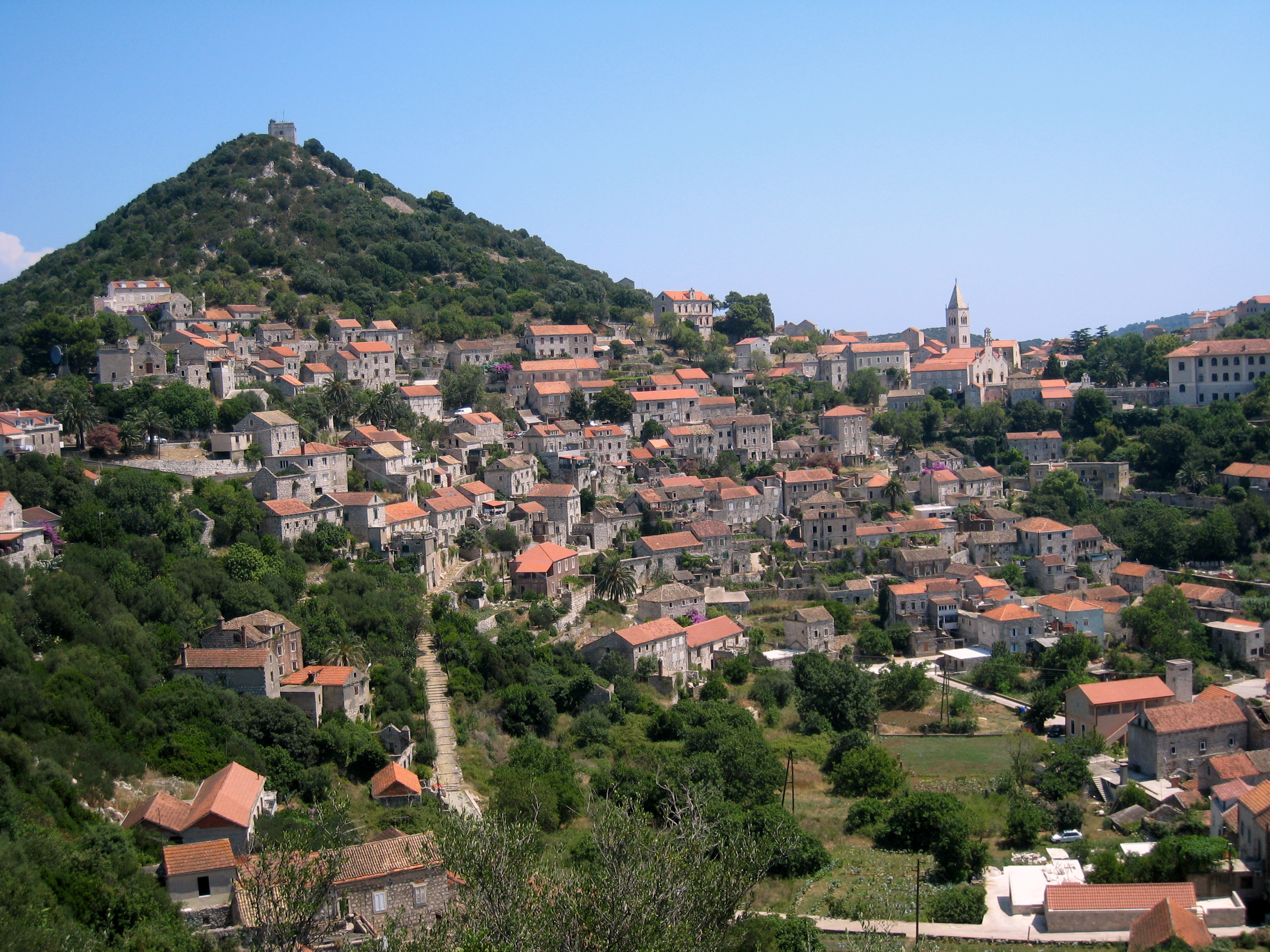
- View of Lastovo

- Location of Lastovo within Croatia
- Coordinates: 42°46′00″N 16°54′00″E
- Country: Croatia
- County: Dubrovnik-Neretva County

Government
  - Mayor: Leo Katić

Area
  - Municipality: 52.5 km^{2} (20.3 sq mi)
  - Urban: 25.8 km^{2} (10.0 sq mi)

Population (2021)
  - Municipality: 748
  - Density: 14.2/km^{2} (36.9/sq mi)
  - Urban: 309
  - Urban density: 12.0/km^{2} (31.0/sq mi)
- Time zone: UTC+1 (CET)
  - Summer (DST): UTC+2 (CEST)
- Postal code: 20290 Lastovo
- Website: lastovo.hr

Lastovo is a village and a municipality in southern Croatia. It is the largest settlement on the eponymous island in Dubrovnik-Neretva County and D119 state road passes through it.

== Demographics ==
In 2021, the municipality had 748 residents in the following 7 settlements:

- Glavat, population 0
- Lastovo, population 309
- Pasadur, population 88
- Skrivena Luka, population 40
- Sušac, population 1
- Uble, population 206
- Zaklopatica, population 104
Lastovo: Population trends 1857–2021
v

population	1148	1042	1050	1226	1384	1417	1558	1700	1738	1721	1449	1210	962	1221	835	792	748
	1857	1869	1880	1890	1900	1910	1921	1931	1948	1953	1961	1971	1981	1991	2001	2011	2021

Sources: Croatian Bureau of Statistics publications

== Gallery ==
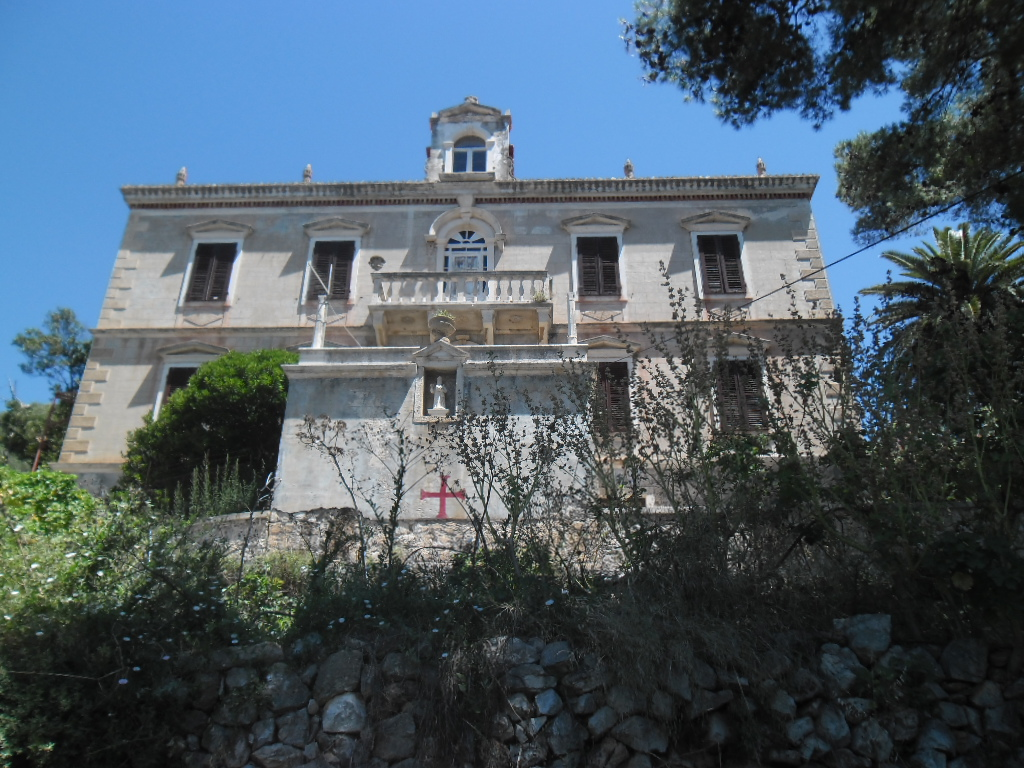
Rector's Palace

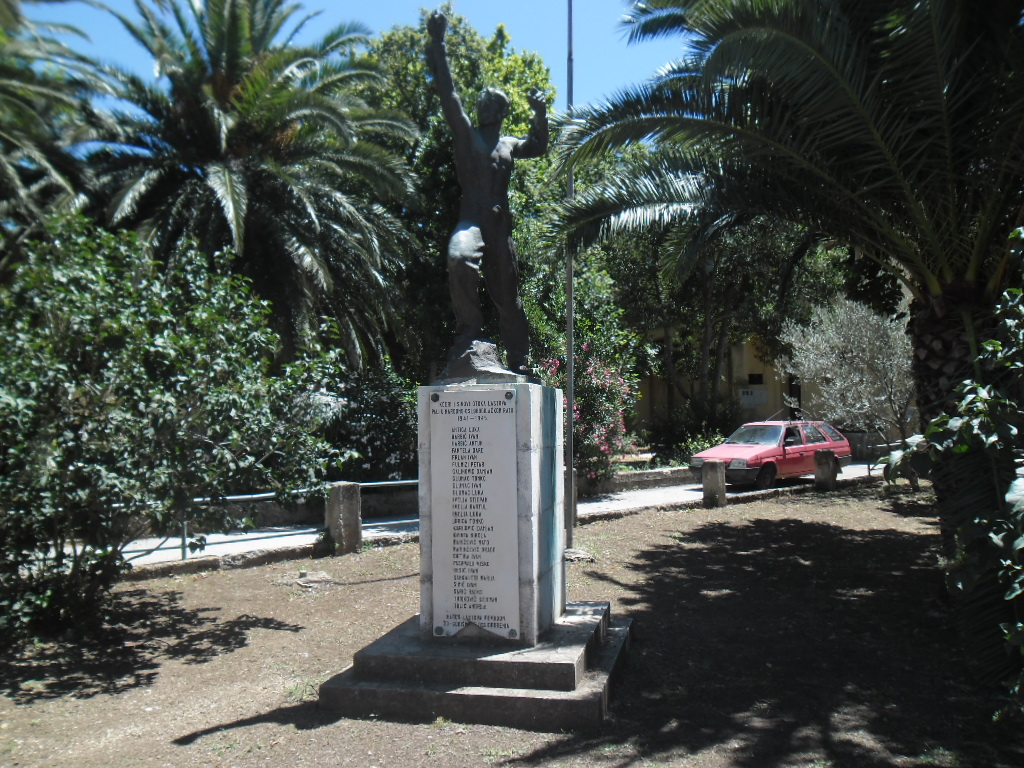
From WWII

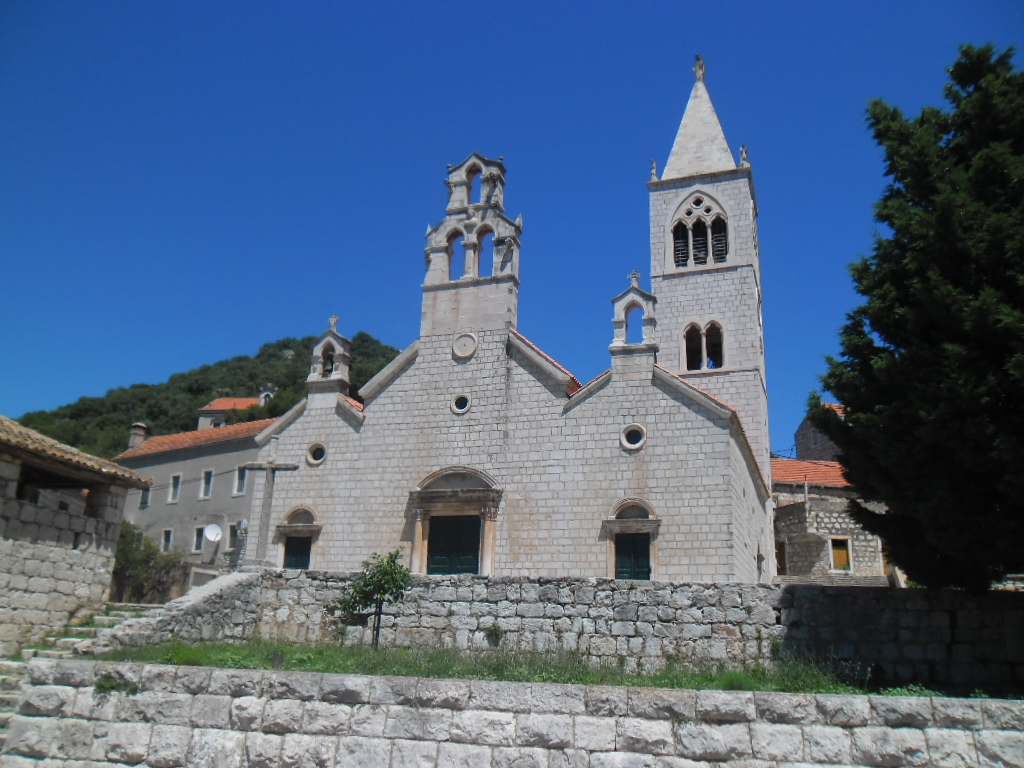
The parish Church of St. Cosmas and Damian

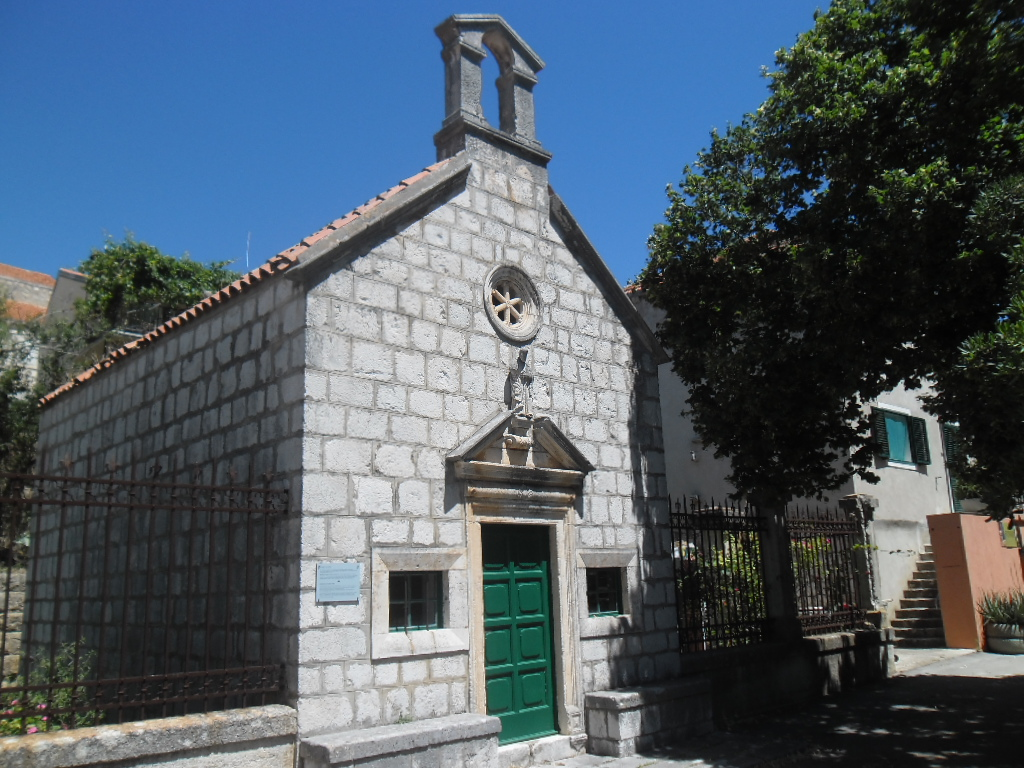
The Church of St. Joseph

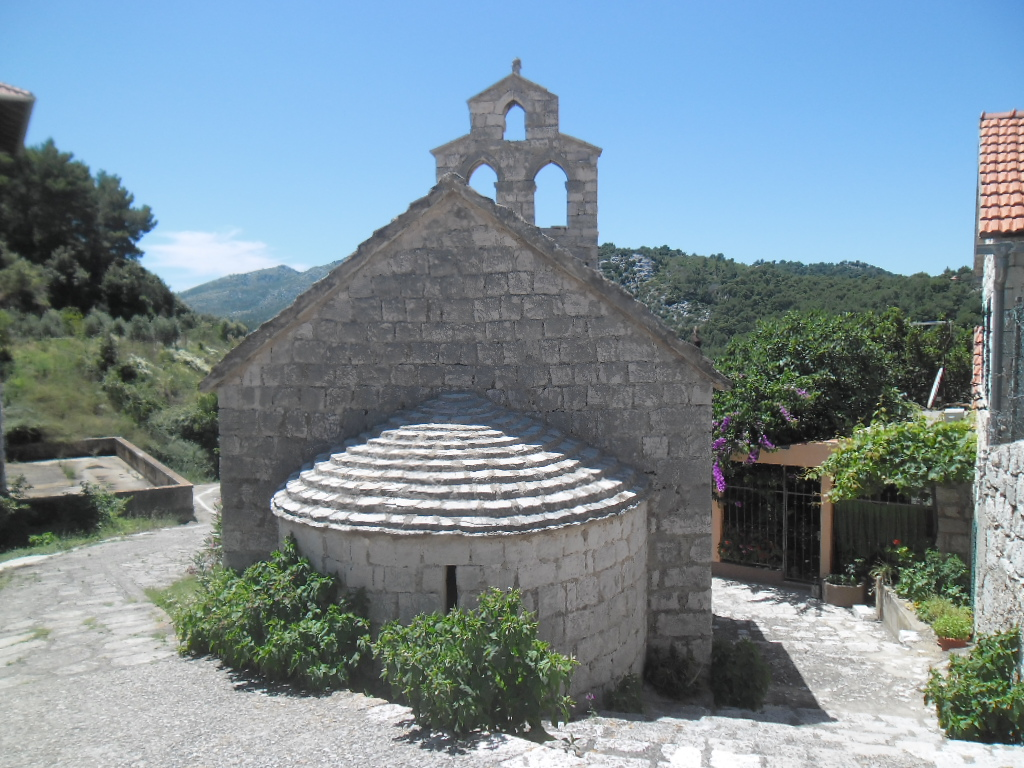
The Chapel of St. Mary at Grža

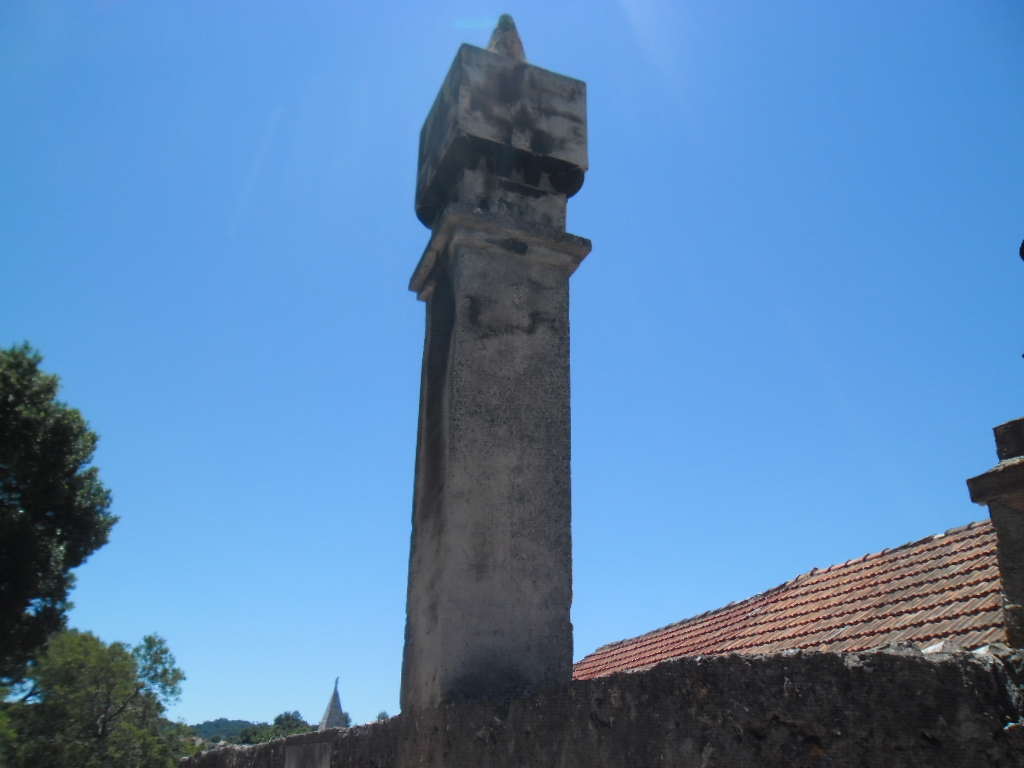
Fumar
