= Church of Saints Cosmas and Damian, Lastovo =

Church on Lastovo Island, Croatia

Coordinates: 42°45′53″N 16°53′43″E

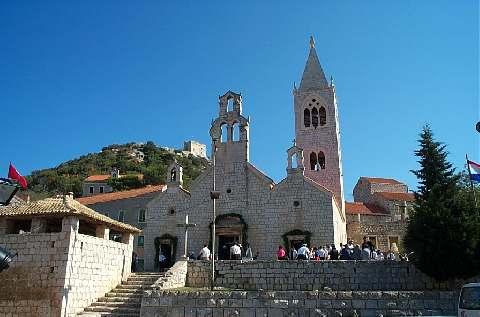
The Church of Saint Cosmas and Damian

The Church of Saints Cosmas and Damian (Croatian: Sv Kuzma i Damjan) is a Roman Catholic church on Lastovo Island off the coast of Croatia.

== History and description ==
It is located in the oldest part of the town square and dates back to the 14th century. On the main altar is the painting of Saints Cosmas and Damian by the Italian Master Giovanni Lanfranco. Of the rest of the paintings, the Pietà, the work of an anonymous Venetian painter from 1545, is particularly distinguished.

Formerly on this site there was a smaller church that dated from the 5th or 6th century, on the foundations of which was constructed the parish church of Saints Cosmas and Damian. It is first mentioned at the beginning of the 14th century. The church with triple nave is the result of construction in two different periods. The central nave is from the second half of the 15th century, while the adjacent naves were added in the 16th and 17th centuries. This expansion is evident on the church façade which has three separate roofs and a pediment crowned with three bell-towers in the shape of a belfry. They were erected in a Gothic style in the 18th century. The central part of the church was built by Croatian artisans. Amongst them, the most important role was that of Master Radosan who carved under the church ceiling in 1473 the inscription: RADOSAN FECIT MCCCCLXXIII MADII. Along the church apse a sacristy was added in 1545, while the Neo-Gothic bell tower was completed in 1942, constructed from Lastovo stone. At the base of the bell tower Antun Lastovac's tombstone was incorporated, who was one of the chaplains of Lastovo from the 15th century. A statute was signed in the front of the church in 1310.

The interior of the church is filled with rich stone furnishings, paintings and artefacts. The church treasury preserves silver and gold-plated Gothic, Renaissance, Baroque and Rococo chalices, monstrances, candle lamps, candle holders and processional crosses as well as unique artworks such a Gothic-Renaissance chalice from the late 15th and early 16th century, the only preserved work by Pavko Antojević in the region. Amongst the artworks, special emphasis is given to the Renaissance vessel used for holy water which was commissioned by Bonino De Boninis.

== Sources ==
- Lastovo History and Culture
