= Statute of Lastovo =

Code of common law of Lastovo, Croatia

Lastovo commune's official seal (pečat) within the Republic of Ragusa, as shown on the Codex Lagostinum

The Codex Lagostinum or Statute of Lastovo (Latin: Statuto di Lagosta, Croatian: Lastovski statut), was a legislation of common law written in 1310 by the population of the island of Lagosta (now called Lastovo, in Croatia), which had autonomy under the Republic of Ragusa. The work is written mostly in Italian, but contains a few Latin sentences. There are Slavic personal names present, due to Slavic influx amid disappearance of Dalmatian-speaking population in the former city-states caused by epidemics and wars.
