= Zaklopatica =

- Village
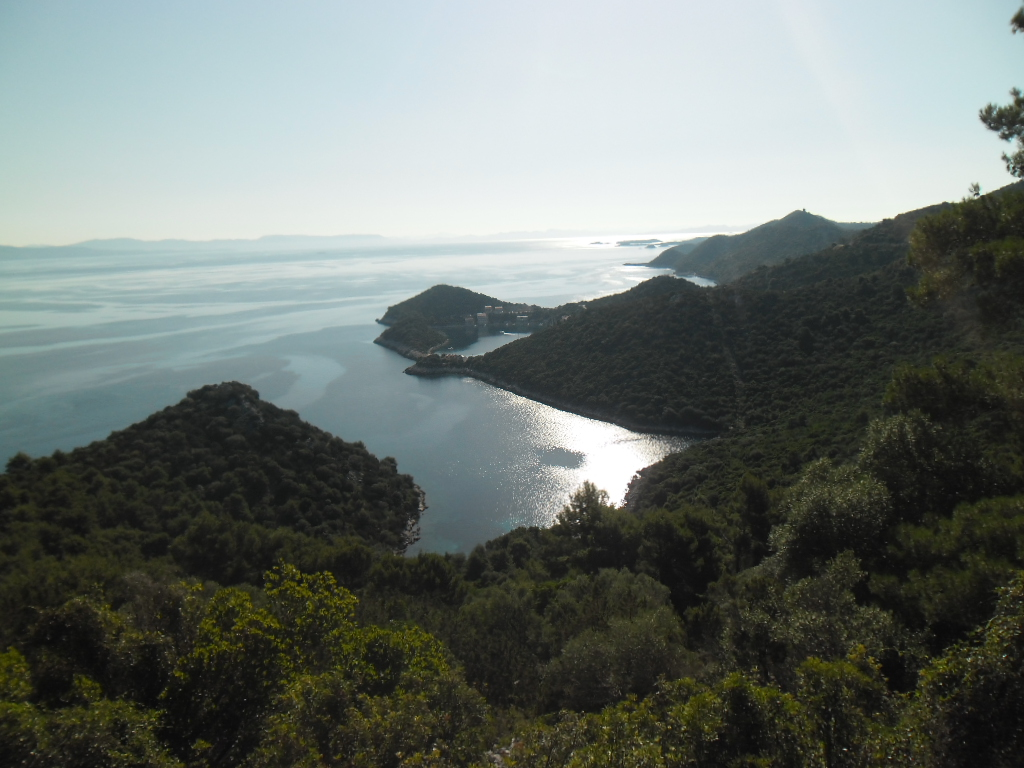

- Location within Croatia
- Coordinates: 42°46′16″N 16°52′26″E
- Country: Croatia
- County: Dubrovnik-Neretva County
- Municipality: Lastovo

Area
  - Total: 0.12 sq mi (0.3 km^{2})

Population (2021)
  - Total: 104
  - Density: 900/sq mi (350/km^{2})
- Time zone: UTC+1 (CET)
  - Summer (DST): UTC+2 (CEST)
- Postal code: 20290 Lastovo

Zaklopatica is a small village in southern Croatia. It is located on the Adriatic island of Lastovo in Dubrovnik-Neretva County.

== Demographics ==
According to the 2021 census, its population was 104. It was 87 in 2011.
