= Mount Hum (Lastovo) =

Mountain in Croatia

- Location within Croatia

Highest point
- Elevation: 415 m (1,362 ft)
- Coordinates: 42°44′42″N 16°51′05″E

Geography
- Location: Croatia

Hum is a hill located on the island of Lastovo, in the Adriatic Sea and Croatia. The highest peaks are the eponymous Hum and Plešivo Brdo, both at 415 m (1,362 ft).
