= Pasadur =

- Village
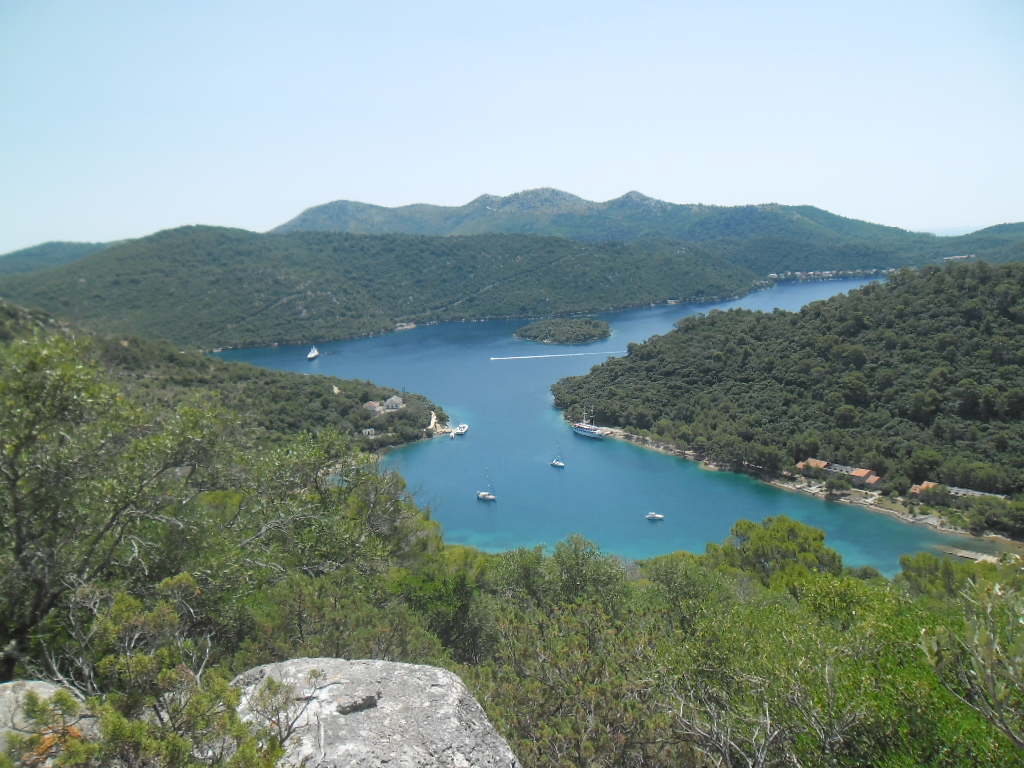

- Location within Croatia
- Coordinates: 42°45′58″N 16°49′23″E
- Country: Croatia
- County: Dubrovnik-Neretva County
- Municipality: Lastovo

Area
  - Total: 1.6 sq mi (4.1 km^{2})

Population (2021)
  - Total: 88
  - Density: 56/sq mi (21/km^{2})
- Time zone: UTC+1 (CET)
  - Summer (DST): UTC+2 (CEST)
- Postal code: 20290 Lastovo

Pasadur is a small coastal village in southern Croatia. It is located on the northwestern shore of the island of Lastovo and the eastern shore of the nearby isle of Prežba, the islands being connected by a small bridge. Administratively it belongs to the Lastovo municipality, which is in turn part of the Dubrovnik-Neretva County.

== Demographics ==
According to the 2021 census, its population was 88. It was 100 in 2011.

== Gallery ==
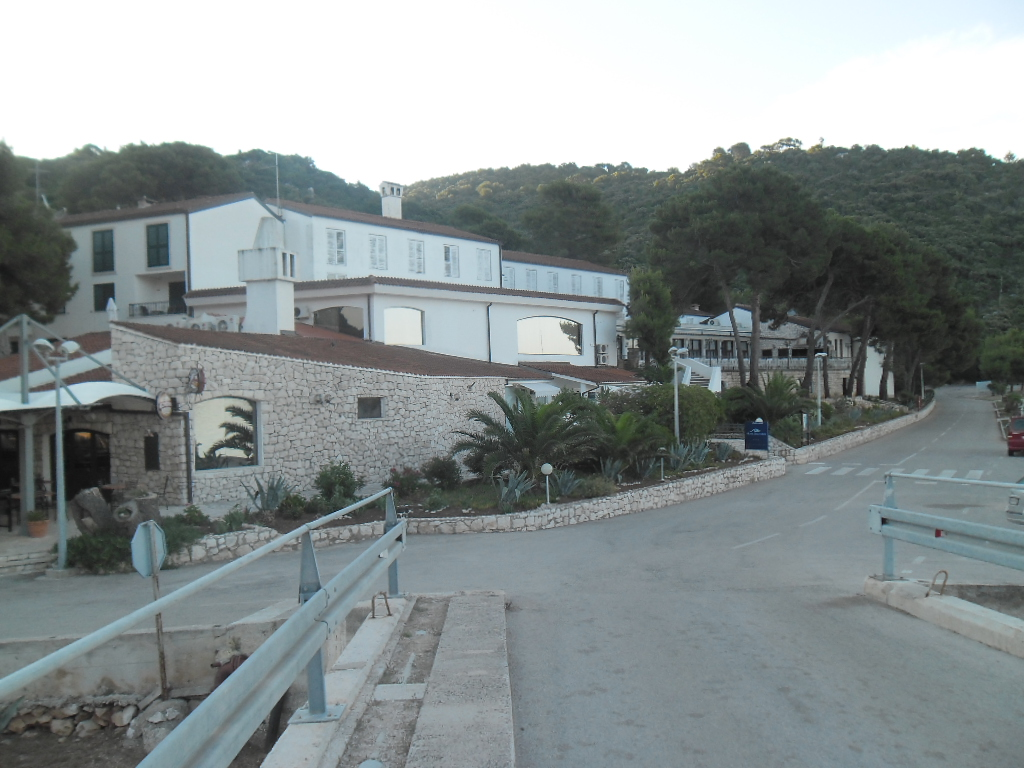

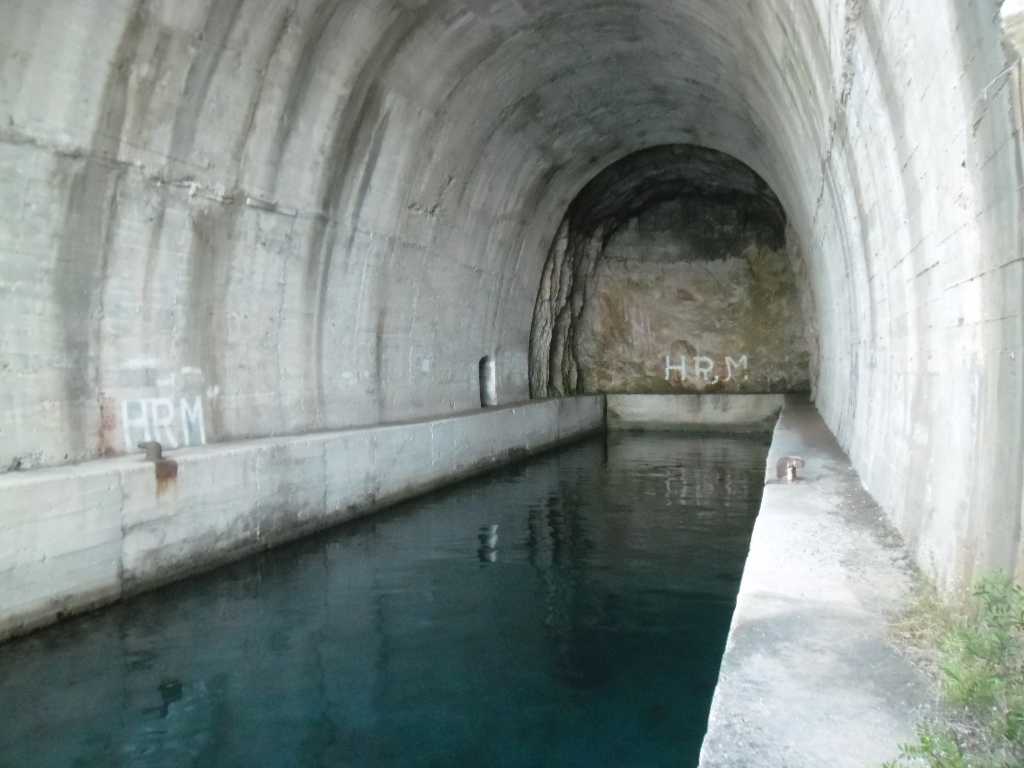

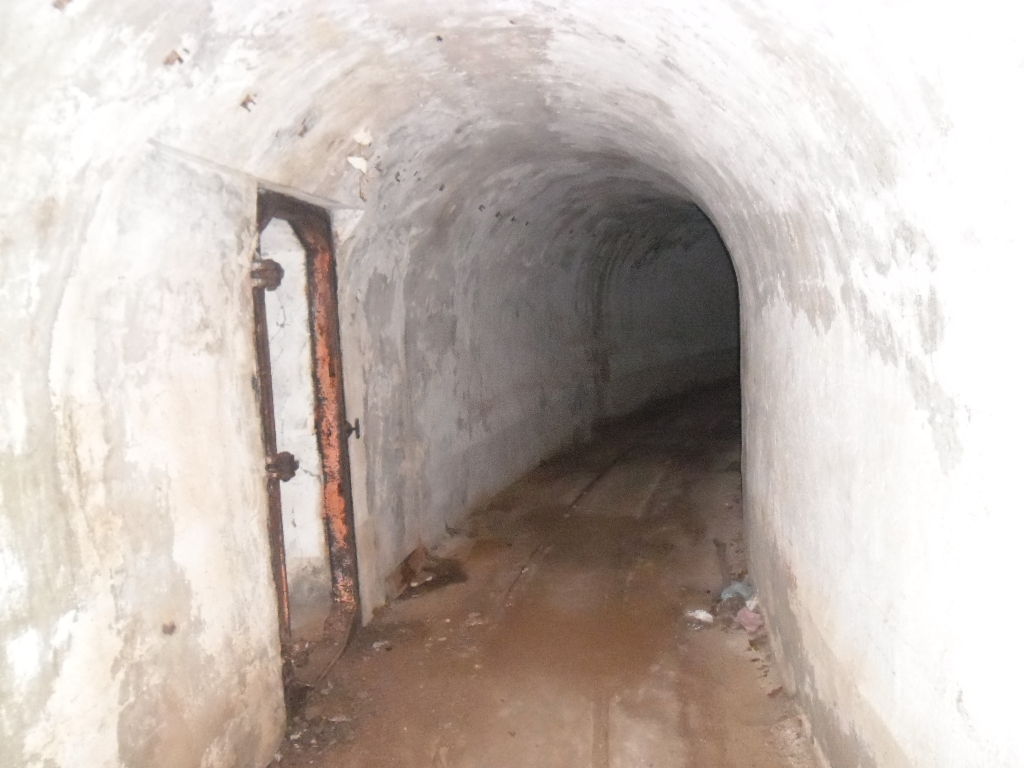
