= Lastovo Poklad =

Croatian yearly event

The procession of the Poklad doll on the donkey

The Poklad (Carnival) event held yearly on the remote Adriatic Island of Lastovo is one of the more distinctive and authentic carnival traditions celebrated in Croatia. All the island residents participate by wearing folk costumes. The origins of the Lastovo carnival go back to a historical event. Legend has it that Catalan pirates attacked neighbouring Korčula and sent a Turkish messenger to Lastovo to tell the islanders to surrender, or they would be next. The inhabitants of Lastovo did not let themselves be intimidated – instead they armed themselves and went on the attack. The women and children walked to Hum barefoot from Lastovo and prayed to Sv. Jure (St. George) for help and their prayers were answered: a storm destroyed the pirates' ships and the inhabitants of Lastovo caught the messenger. In order to mock him, he was taken through the village on the back of a donkey and was afterwards sentenced and burned to death. This event is celebrated through the Poklad every year over a period of two days just before Lent.

The first recorded mention of the Lastovo carnival is from 16th century. In 1483 the Prince forbade the often riotous carnival crowd to bear arms. Those who disobeyed his decree ran the risk of being banished from the island.

== Carnival tradition ==
A Pokladar shown in his traditional uniform

As in other countries, the "carnival season" starts on Lastovo after the New Year on January 6 – the Feast of the Three Kings, and ends on the night preceding Ash Wednesday. (Because of the movable date of Easter the date occurs between February 10 and March 17).

On the morning of Obese Monday the doll or puppet called Poklad is made. The festivities follow a detailed pattern: in the early morning on the Monday before Lent, the Poklad is made. The body is filled with straw and grain husks, while the feet are filled with sand from the local cemetery. The doll is then dressed – a red costume and fez hat – the face is drawn in with coal, and a cigarette is placed in the mouth. Afterwards, the carnival participants go from door to door collecting eggs and entertaining their hosts.

On Carnival Tuesday (Shrove Tuesday) at eleven o'clock church bells halt all activity in the village. The carnival crowd, known as "Pokladari," gather with and start playing their lyres. The carnival procession begins and is accompanied by the music until the end. The Poklad is placed on the village donkey judged to be the most beautiful. The flag-bearer of the Croatian national tri-colour, the doll on the donkey and the carnival participants make their way towards City Hall (in the past to the Dubrovnik Rector) in order to get permission to visit respected locals.

The Poklad doll sent down the rope with firecrackers exploding beneath

As they stop at the houses of the most prominent villagers singing and shouting, and performing the sword dance – similar to the more famous Moreška and Kumpanija from nearby Korčula – will take place on some of the locals' terraces. The carnival crowd who, up until the last century were armed with real swords, are followed at some distance by the "beautiful maskers" (girls in costumes and masks). The procession halts when it reaches Pod kostajnu (the tree growing in the middle of the village). A length of rope measuring over 300 meters has already been stretched between the pole set here and another mounted on the top of the hill in the background of the western side of the village. The procession climbs up to the top of the hill and the puppet is attached to the rope down which it slides three times, with petards cracking under its feet. Each time it reaches the bottom of the rope, the Poklad is met by drawn swords.

After this, the procession heads to the parish church where they are joined by the masked women at dusk. Dancing with the "beautiful maskers" and a sword performance takes place at which also includes circle dancing all of which stops at the signal given by the Admiral. His gesture means that the Poklad must be impaled. The Pokladari set it on fire and start running with the puppet around the circle of dancers. Once the Poklad is burnt down to ashes, the crowd starts shouting, "UVO! UVO! UVO!" After this, the islanders head home and the church bells mark the end of the carnival.

== Symbolism ==
The Lastovo carnival could be explained as a whole system of symbols. Culjanje, hanging and sliding of the puppet down the rope, as well as its death at the stake stand probably for the purification by air and by fire, i.e. for the ritual redemption of the community from the evil which had settled in the village during the preceding year. In the first joining of the carnival crowd by the youth and in the collection of eggs, the underlying pattern of the ritual initiation and fertility rites can be recognised. Lastovo is a typical farmers' and cultivators' community. The episode where the Poklad is lowered down the rope is observed with silent attentiveness because it is immensely important for the community that the Poklad should not slip from their hands or turn over on the rope. This would otherwise predict a bad year for the island's vineyards and harvests.

Whether this is true or not, the villagers take this ancient carnival extremely seriously and it is in no way meant to be a "tourist attraction." Lastovci from all around the world return to the island for this event every year and the participants take part in the festival with a certain level of pride.
