= Skrivena Luka =

Skrivena Luka Portorus
- Village
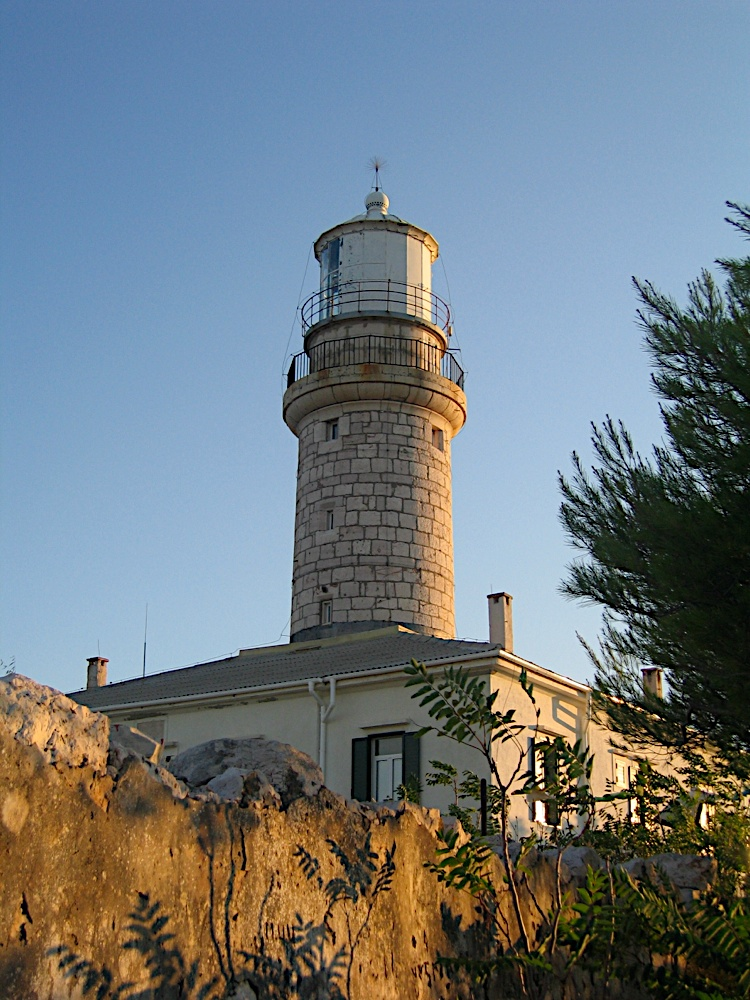
- Struga Lighthouse

- Location within Croatia
- Coordinates: 42°44′13″N 16°53′10″E
- Country: Croatia
- County: Dubrovnik-Neretva County
- Municipality: Lastovo

Area
  - Total: 0.66 sq mi (1.7 km^{2})

Population (2021)
  - Total: 40
  - Density: 61/sq mi (24/km^{2})
- Time zone: UTC+1 (CET)
  - Summer (DST): UTC+2 (CEST)
- Postal code: 20290 Lastovo

Skrivena Luka (literally "Hidden Harbor" in Croatian), known by locals as Portorus, is a small village in Croatia. It is located on the southern shore of the island of Lastovo and belongs to the eponymous municipality within Dubrovnik-Neretva County in the south of the country.

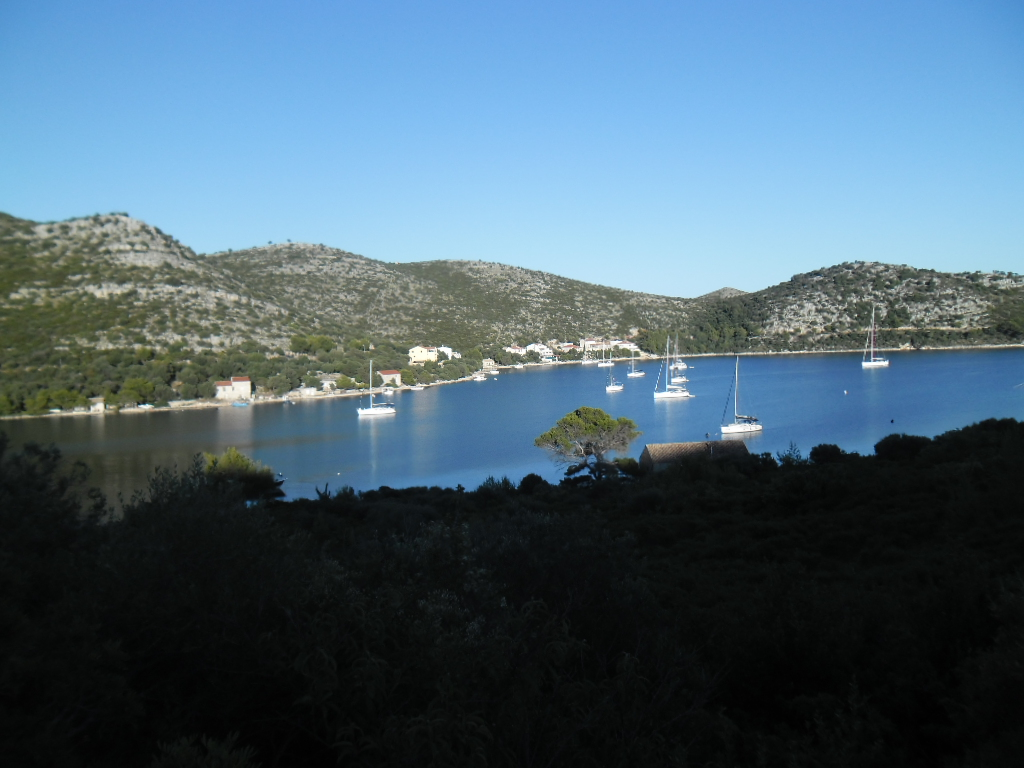
Skrivena Luka

The Struga Lighthouse was built in 1839 at the mouth of Skrivena Luka Bay. It is one of the oldest lighthouses in Croatia, located 70 metres above the sea, on the edge of a steep cliff. The light from Struga is seen 20 miles away and it warns ships that they are close to Lastovo.

Within the bay it is possible to see Gorgonia coral and peregrine falcons.

== Demographics ==
According to the 2021 census, its population was 40. It was 33 in 2011.
