= Uble =

Uble Ubli
- Village
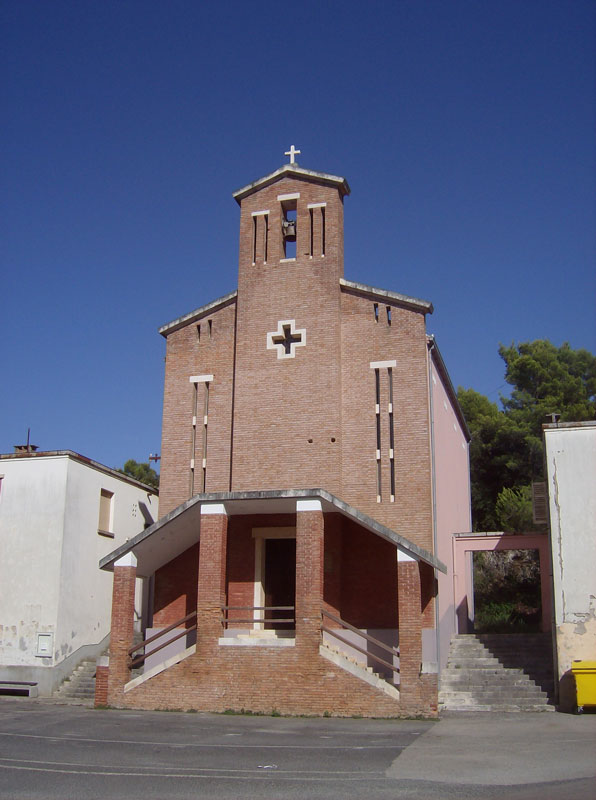

- Location within Croatia
- Coordinates: 42°44′00″N 16°50′00″E
- Country: Croatia
- County: Dubrovnik-Neretva County
- Municipality: Lastovo

Area
  - Total: 5.3 sq mi (13.6 km^{2})

Population (2021)
  - Total: 206
  - Density: 39.2/sq mi (15.1/km^{2})
- Time zone: UTC+1 (CET)
  - Summer (DST): UTC+2 (CEST)
- Postal code: 20290 Lastovo

Uble, also referred to as Ubli, is a small coastal village in southern Croatia. It is located on the island of Lastovo in Dubrovnik-Neretva County.

The single nave Christian basilica built between 5th-6th century was dedicated to St. Peter. It represented the urban centre of the continuously growing and prospering ancient settlement near the natural port in Ubli on the Island of Lastovo. After archaeological research work, the basilica was conserved and classified as a monument of the highest category.

== Demographics ==
According to the 2021 census, its population was 206. It was 222 in 2011.

== Gallery ==
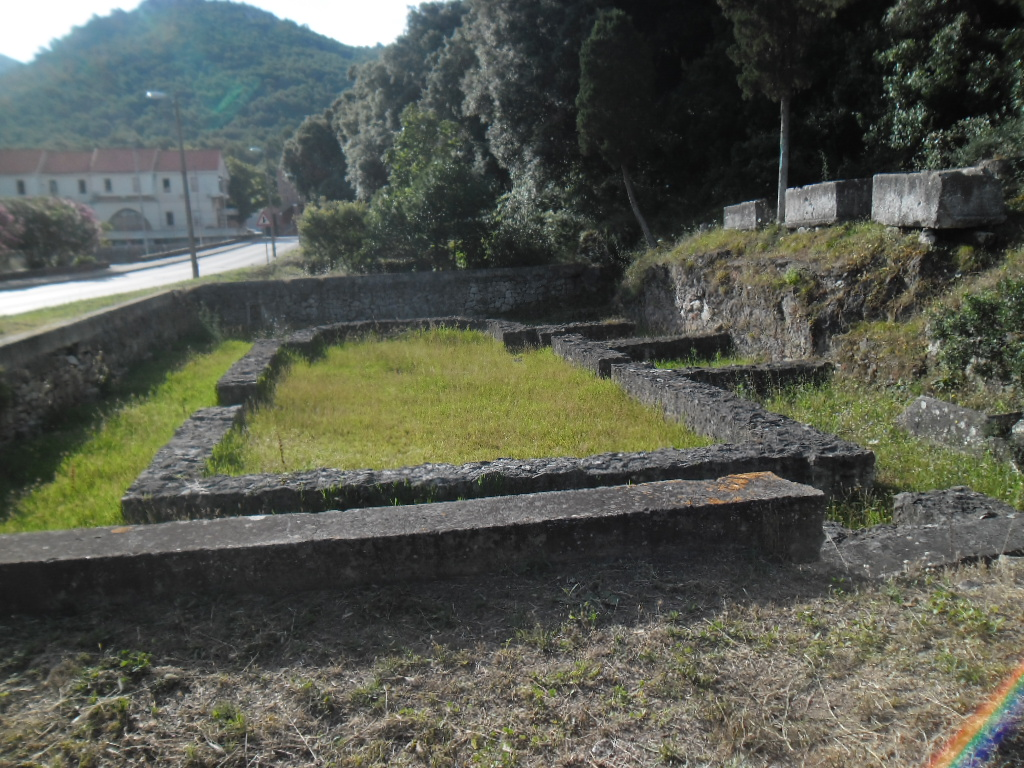

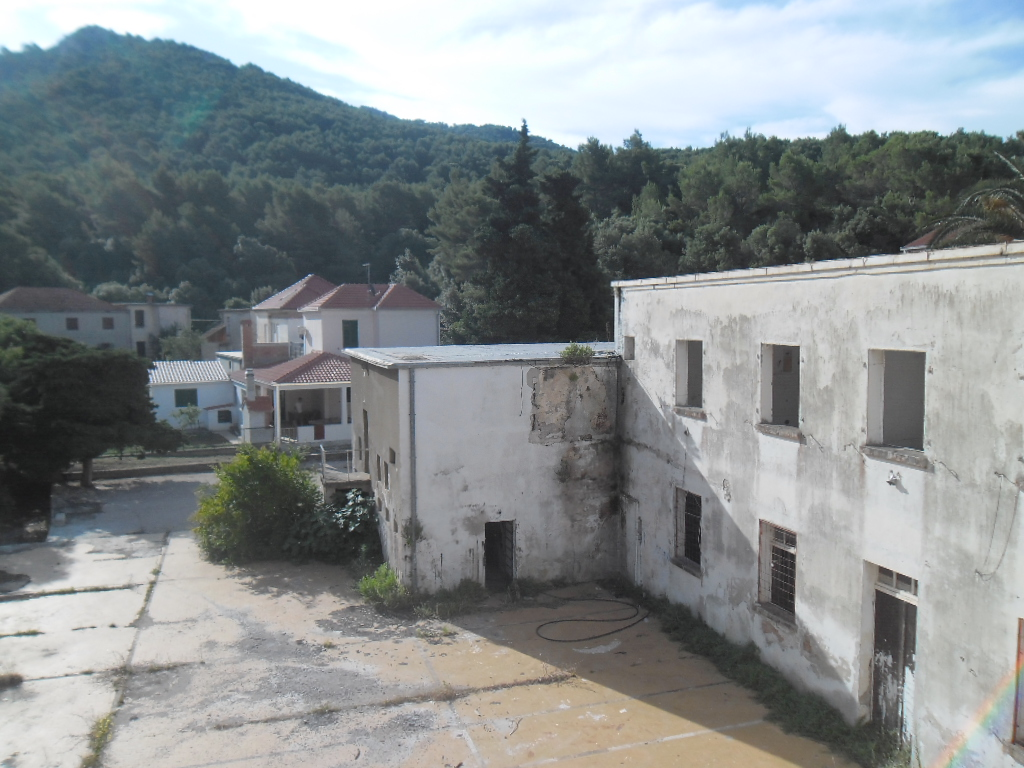

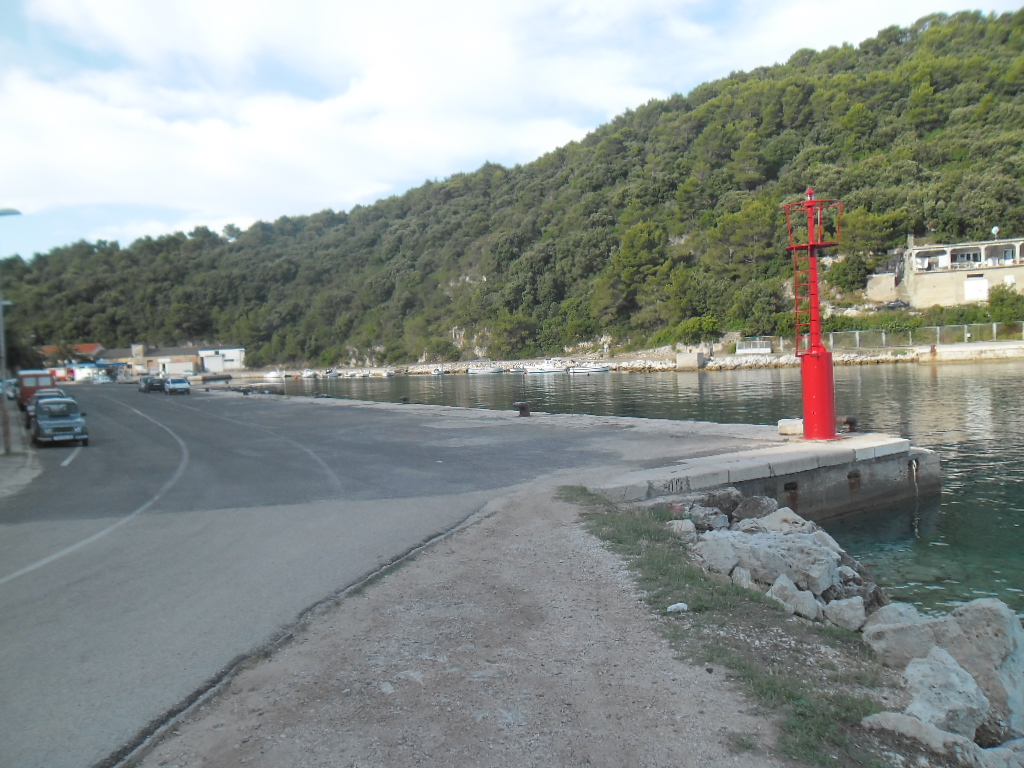
