= Lastovo =

Island in Croatia

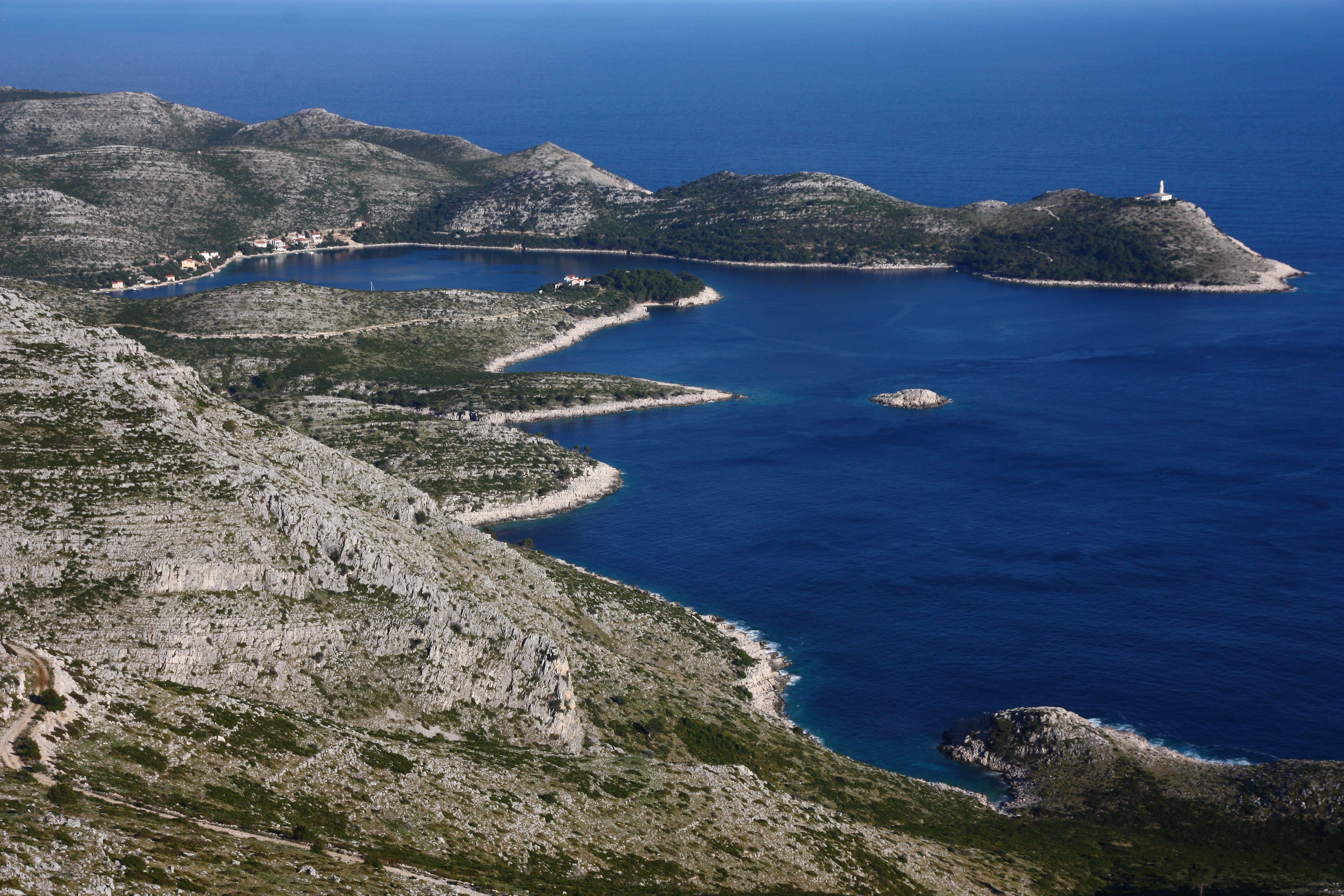
- Skrivena Luka town on Lastovo
- Interactive map of Lastovo

Geography
- Location: Adriatic Sea
- Coordinates: 42°45′N 16°52′E
- Archipelago: Central Dalmatian
- Area: 46.87 km^{2} (18.10 sq mi)
- Length: 9.8 km (6.09 mi)
- Width: 5.8 km (3.6 mi)
- Coastline: 46.4 km (28.83 mi)
- Highest elevation: 415 m (1362 ft)
- Highest point: Hum

Administration
- Croatia
- County: Dubrovnik-Neretva County
- Largest settlement: Lastovo (pop. 344)

Demographics
- Population: 792 (2011)
- Pop. density: 16.9/km^{2} (43.8/sq mi)
- Ethnic groups: 94.7% Croats

Lastovo (pronounced [lâstɔv̞ɔ]), also known as Lagosta, is an archipelago and municipality in Dubrovnik-Neretva County in Croatia. The municipality consists of 46 islands with a total population of 792 people, of which 94.7% are ethnic Croats, and a land area of approximately 53 square kilometres (20 sq mi). The biggest island in the archipelago is also named Lastovo, as is the largest town. The majority of the population lives on the 46-square-kilometre (18 sq mi) island of Lastovo.

Lastovo, like the rest of the Roman province of Dalmatia, was settled by Illyrians. Ancient Rome conquered and settled the entire area, retaining control until the Avar invasions and Slavic migrations in the 7th century. The Croats and their subject fellow Slavic tribes secured most of the Dalmatian seaboard, but some cities and islands (like Lagosta) of the romanised Dalmatians remained independent under the nominal rule of the Byzantine Empire. In 1000 AD the Venetians attacked and destroyed the settlement due to the island's participation in piracy along the Adriatic coast. After the Venetian domination, in the 13th century Lagosta joined the Republic of Ragusa where for several centuries it enjoyed a certain level of autonomy until the republic's conquest by the French under Napoleon. The Austrian Empire and Austria-Hungary then ruled the island for the next century, then Italy for 30 years following World War I, and finally Yugoslavia until it became a part of the independent Republic of Croatia.

The island is noted for its 15th- and 16th-century Venetian Renaissance architecture. There is a large number of churches of relatively small size, a testament to the island's long-standing Roman Catholic tradition. The major cultural event is the Poklade, or carnival. The island largely relies on its natural environment to attract tourists each season. In 2006 the Croatian Government designated the island and its archipelago a nature park. Some conservancy groups have demanded the island receive heritage status.

== Geography ==
Lastovo and surrounding islands

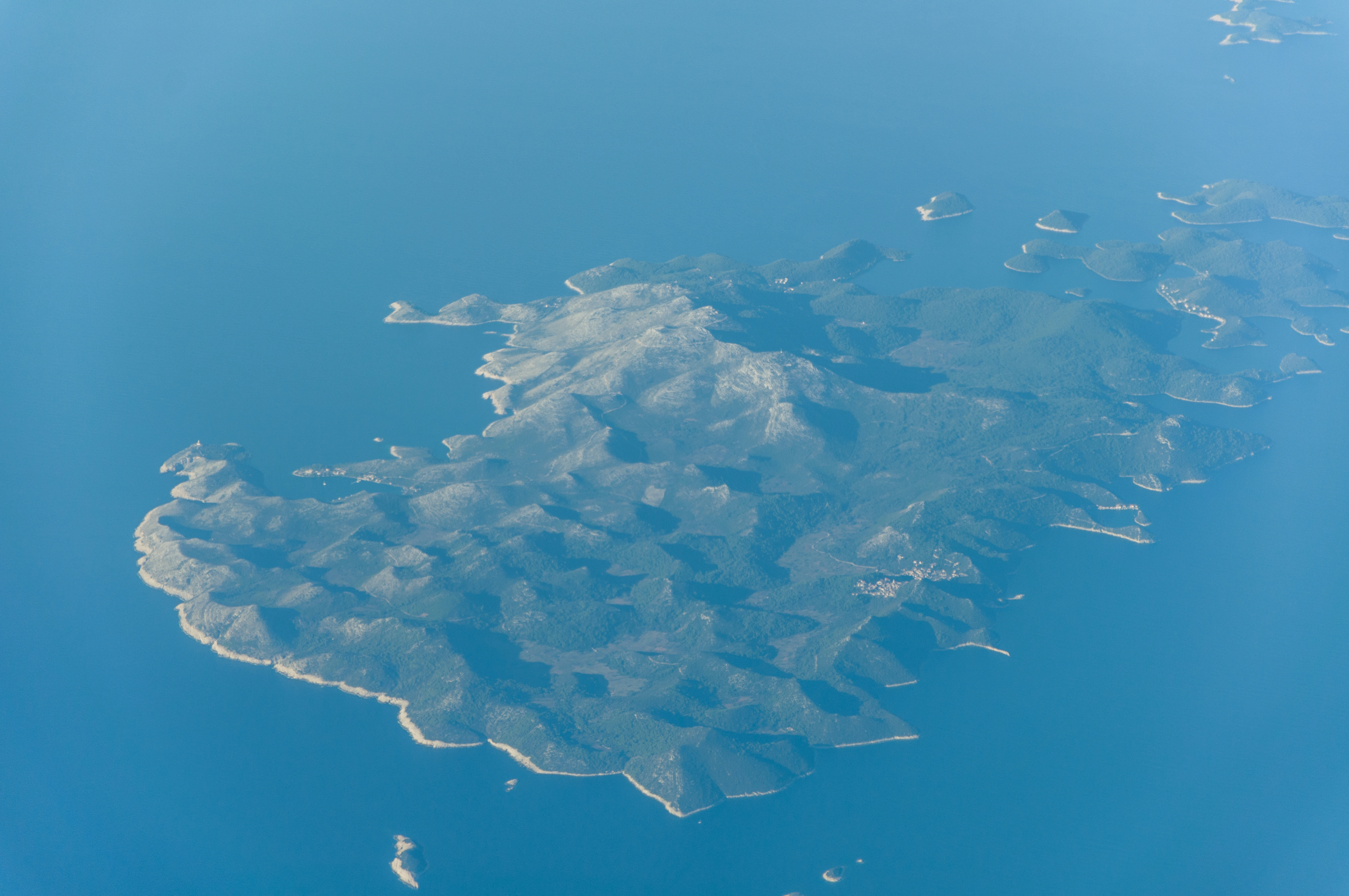
Aerial view of Lastovo

The island of Lastovo belongs to the central Dalmatian archipelago. Thirteen kilometres (8.1 miles) south of Korčula, the island is one of the most remote inhabited islands in the Adriatic Sea. Other islands in this group include Vis, Brač, Hvar, Korčula and Mljet. The dimensions of the island are approximately 9.8 kilometres (6.1 miles) long by up to 5.8 kilometres (3.6 miles) wide.

The Lastovo archipelago contains a total of 46 islands, including the larger islands Sušac, Prežba, Mrčara and an island group called Lastovnjaci on the eastern side. Prežba is connected to the main island by a bridge at the village of Pasadur ("golden passage" in the local dialect, coming from Italian "passo d'oro"). The island has a daily hydrofoil service and ferry service linking it to the mainland at Split and stopping along the way at Korčula and Hvar.

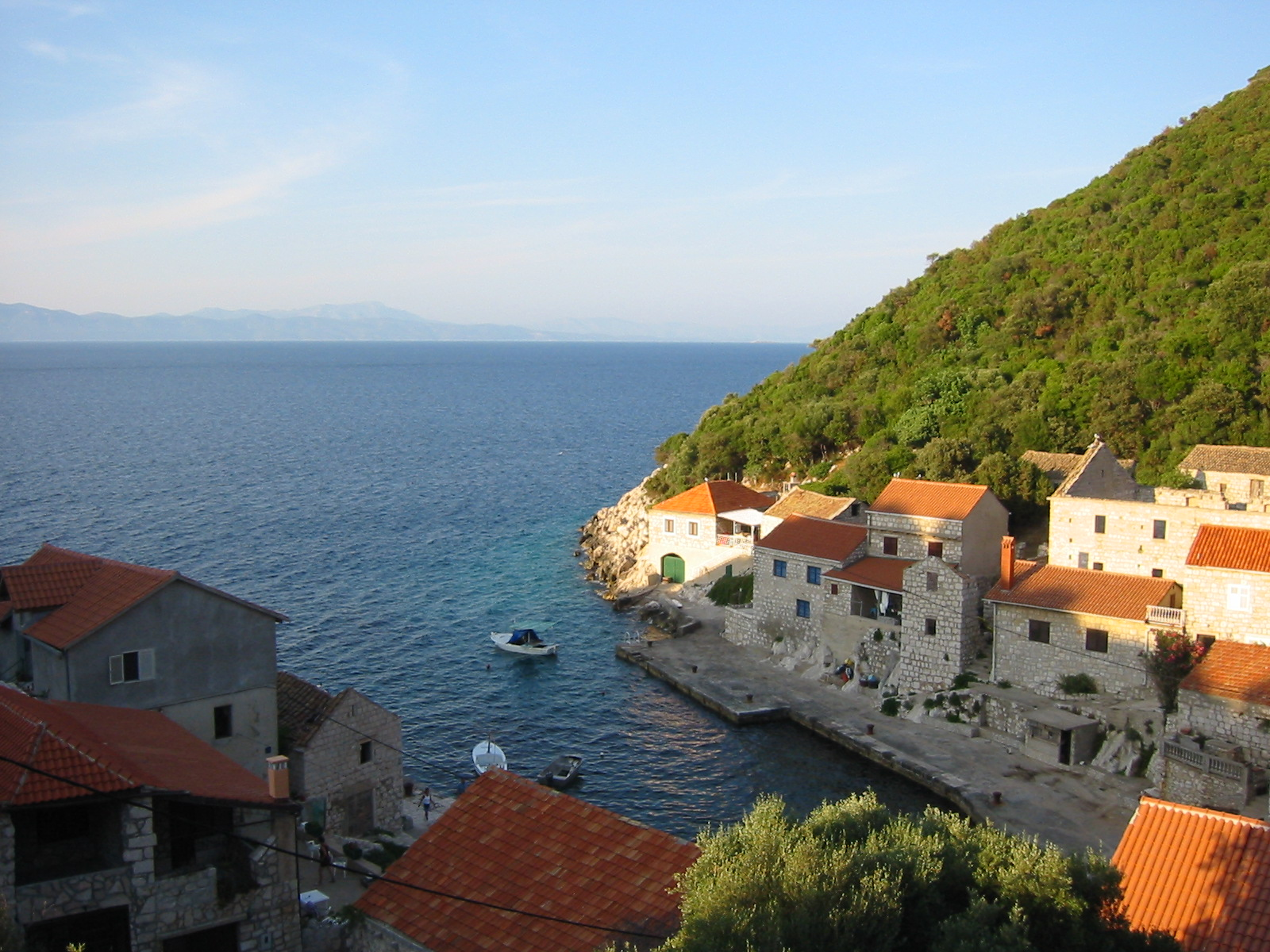
Lučica

The town of Lastovo is spread over the steep banks of a natural amphitheatre overlooking a fertile field, facing away from the sea. This is unusual compared to other Adriatic islands, which are normally harbour side. Other settlements on the island include the villages of Ubli (also known as Sveti Petar), Zaklopatica, Skrivena Luka, and Pasadur.

Despite major fires in 1971, 1998 and 2003, about 60% of Lastovo is covered with forest, mostly holm oaks and Aleppo pines and Mediterranean underbrush. There are rich communities of falcon and hawk nests. These used to be exploited by the Dubrovnik Republic for falconry and traded to other kingdoms, especially to Kingdom of Naples in the Middle Ages. The underwater life is the richest in the entire Adriatic, featuring lobsters, crayfish, octopus and many high prized fish such as John Dory and Groupers. There are no venomous snakes on the island.

=== Landscape and coastline ===
Lastovo has a dynamic landscape consisting of 46 hills and 46 karstic fields that often contain layers of red soil and quartz sand. The highest points are on Mount Hum, the eponymous Hum and Plešivo Brdo, both at 415 m (1,362 ft). There are several other peaks higher than 200 m (660 ft), including the scenic Sozanj at 231 m (758 ft). Its dolomitic valleys are located between limy hills and mild calcareous slopes rich in caves. There are five caves on the island — Rača (the largest), Puzavica, Pozalica, Grapčeva and Medvidina. The coastline is mainly steep and the surrounding sea is deep. On the southern coast is a large, deep bay at Skrivena Luka which offers protection from the bura and westerly winds. The other main deep port is located on the western side at Ubli which is where the main ferry port for the island is located.

=== Climate ===
Lastovo possesses all the basic characteristics of the Mediterranean climate, dominated by mild, moist winters and warm, long, and dry summers. The island receives around 2,700 sun hours per year, ranking it one of the sunniest in the Adriatic and pleasant for tourists. This produces a water temperature around 27 °C (81 °F) in summer. Annual rainfall is 622 millimetres (24.5 in). Since there are no permanent surface water streams, residents rely on bores, dams and wells.

Since records began in 1949, the highest temperature recorded at the local weather station at an elevation of 186 metres (610 ft) was 38.3 °C (100.9 °F), on 3 August 1998. The coldest temperature was −6.8 °C (19.8 °F), on 23 January 1963.

== History ==
=== Prehistory and antiquity ===
The island was first mentioned by 6th century lexicographer Stephanus of Byzantium who called it Ladesta (Λάδεστα) and Ladeston (Λάδεστον). His source was Theopompus, a 4th-century BC Greek historian. The names of numerous other Illyric settlements along the coast had the same suffix -est which indicates its Illyric origins. When the Romans conquered Dalmatia they gave the island the Latin name Augusta Insula meaning "Emperor's Island". During the Middle Ages, the name would be transcribed as Augusta, Lagusta or Lagosta. The Slavic suffix -ovo combined with the Roman form of Lasta gives the islands present name of Lastovo.

The first traces of human presence on the island were found in the Rača cave where continuous evidence of habitation reaches as far as the late Neolithic Age. In prehistoric times the island was inhabited by the Illyrians. However finds of Greek ceramics show that the island was on one of the Greek trade routes on the Adriatic and probably a part of the state of Issa.

When the Romans conquered the province of Dalmatia they too settled Lastovo. The Romans named the island Augusta Insula. The Romans left traces of their long rule on the island, in the form of the so-called villa rustica estates (residential farming units) and the water catchment areas known as the lokve. The Romans established a settlement on location of today's village of Ubli that flourished during first centuries AD, only to become completely abandoned in later centuries after being destroyed by the barbarians.

=== Middle Ages ===
With the arrival of the Croats to Adriatic in the 7th century, Croats eventually settled most of Dalmatia which included Lastovo. Around 950, the Byzantine emperor Constantine VII Porphyrogenitos mentions Lastovo in his De Administrando Imperio by its Croatian name Lastobon. In 998 the Venetian Doge Pietro Orseolo II launched large military operations against Croatian and Neretvian pirates along the Adriatic and its islands, which culminated in 1000 with the destruction of the town of Lastovo. After that the residents (Lastovci or Lastovčani) decided to build a city on the internal hill away from the coast which made the city more defendable. During the next two centuries, inhabitants dedicated themselves more to agriculture and neglected their earlier naval tradition. Scarcity of accurate historical documents and an almost complete silence covering the events on the island in the early Middle Ages are trustworthy signs of a great autonomy of Lastovo in that period. Lastovo may have at times come briefly under various rulers from the 7th to 13th centuries, whether Byzantine, Dukljan or Narentine, however, it is accepted that Lastovo generally recognised the Croatian kings as its nominal and natural rulers. In 1185 the Hvar diocese is formed of which Lastovo is mentioned as having been part. A church synod held in Split that same year decreed that the diocese of Hvar should fall under the authority of the Archbishop of Split.

=== Republic of Ragusa ===
Lastovo commune's official seal known as the Pečat within the Republic of Ragusa

Later in the 13th century the people of Lastovo voluntarily joined the Republic of Ragusa in 1252 after the republic promised that it would honour Lastovo's internal autonomy. This agreement was codified in the Ragusa Statute written in 1272. However, Ragusa purchased Lastovo from Stefan Uroš I king of Serbia who had rights over the island as ruler of parts of Hum. In 1310 Lastovo got its first written legislation, the Statute of Lastovo, which had all the characteristics of law. The supreme authority on the island had a council consisting of 20 members who held office for life. In 1486 the authority of the Council was transferred to the Parliament of the Republic and the island lost much of its autonomy. Continuous limitation of the island's autonomy and higher taxes led to a short lived rebellion in 1602. On the appeal of islanders, Venice occupied the island the following year and held it until 1606, when it was returned to Ragusa. The next attempt at rebellion was in 1652, which resulted in the loss of the island's autonomy.

During the Ottoman conquests, Lastovo was very often a target of pirates from Ulcinj, leading to the introduction of mandatory guard service. Guard service was abolished in the 18th century when pirates from Ulcinj became merchant sailors. The last reported outbreak of vampirism in Croatia was 'recorded' on Lastovo. The trial in Ragusa in 1737 took testimony from visitors to the island during an outbreak of severe diarrhoea which killed many locals. The islanders blamed this epidemic on vampires. This case included from Lastovo the defendants who formed a band or group of vigilante style vampire hunters. Such cases were reported throughout all of Croatia and indeed Europe in the Middle Ages.

=== 19th century ===
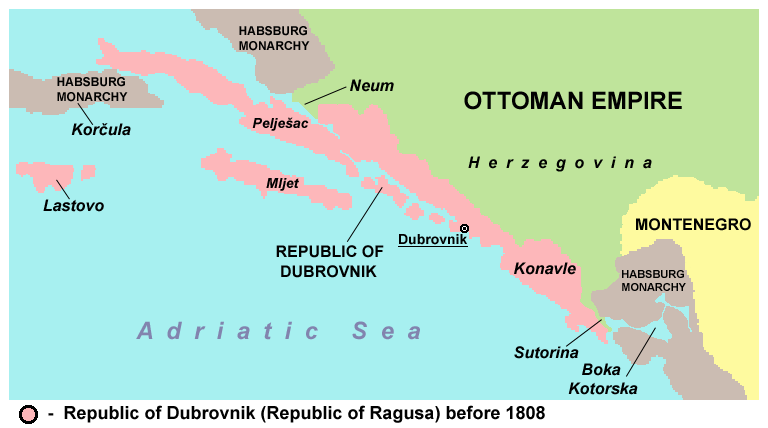
Republic of Ragusa before 1808.

In 1806 the French took control of the Republic of Ragusa. When they abolished the Republic in 1808, Lastovo became part of the French Empire and was included in the Napoleonic "Kingdom of Italy". The French built a fortification on Glavica hill and mobilised islanders against the British. Between 18 January and 3 February 1813, the Royal Navy frigate HMS Apollo and troops captured Lastovo and Korčula. The British held the island until 1815 when the Congress of Vienna awarded the island to the Austrian Empire. After 1815, Lastovo was part of Dubrovnik county in the Austrian province of Dalmatia. Until 1829, it had its own court, but later the island fell under the jurisdiction of the court in Korčula. In the 1840s, the municipality fell into a deep economic crisis that resulted in its selling most of its forests to foreigners.

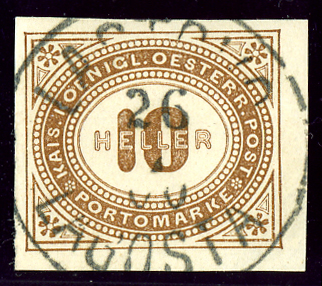
Austrian KK tax stamp cancelled in 1900, with both Croatian and Italian names

=== 20th century ===
During World War I, the Austro-Hungarian Army established a military garrison on Glavica consisting mostly of Hungarian troops. The authorities ordered blackouts and forbade the ringing of church bells during the war. At the end of 1917, four French planes bombed Lastovo. Some French troops landed on the island to reconnoiter it. Italian forces soon followed and clashed with the garrison. Some members of the Austro-Hungarian garrison escaped. The Italians took those they caught to Italy as prisoners of war. A French plane dropping leaflets on the island on 4 November brought the news that the war was finally over. On 11 November 1918 Italian troops took possession of the island based on the 1915 Secret Treaty of London, which allocated much of Dalmatia to Italy upon Italy entering the war on the side of the Triple Alliance. The Italians based their claim upon the presence of ethnic Italians in all parts of maritime Dalmatia. However, U.S. President Woodrow Wilson, who was a supporter of the nationality principle, blocked the allocation.

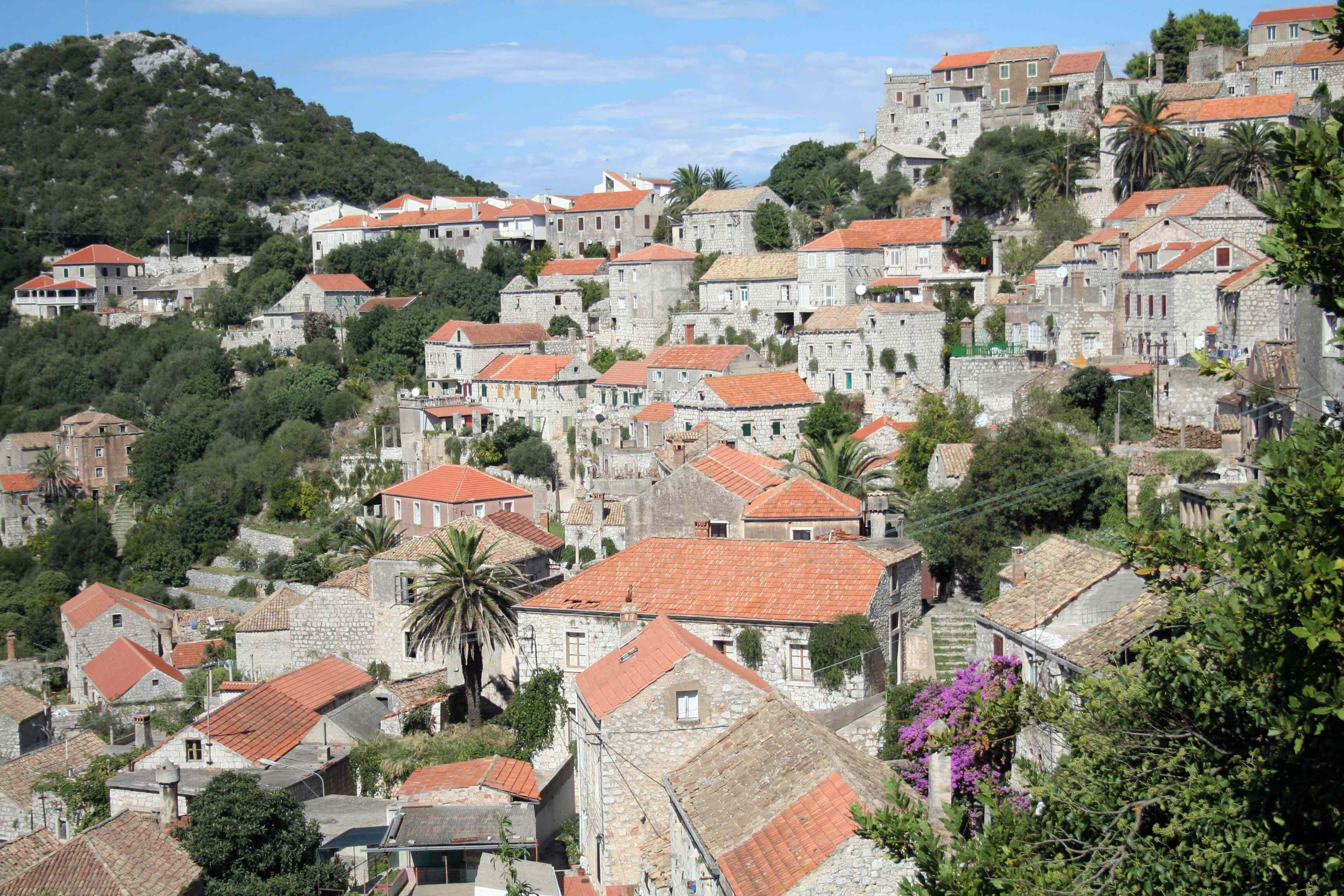
Town of Lastovo

As a consequence, under the Rapallo agreement of 1920, Italy received in Dalmatia only Zara (today Zadar), due to its Italian majority, and Lagosta. Although the Italian population was in the minority, it was smaller than other Dalmatian places such as Vis (Lissa). After the advent of Fascism in Italy (1922), the Italians followed a policy of Italianization in all its possessions. At the same time, living standards improved. Many public works were started, and the island reached its peak population of approximately 2,000. This growth resulted in part from the immigration from other Dalmatian towns, of ethnic Italians who wished to live under Italian rule.

In 1941, the Axis powers attacked Yugoslavia, which collapsed in a few days. Italy annexed part of Dalmatia; the remainder became part of the new Independent State of Croatia. On 8 September 1943, after the declaration of the Armistice with Italy, the Italian Army collapsed and Josip Broz Tito's Partisans took over the island, incorporating it into Yugoslavia. Lastovo became a part of the People's Republic of Croatia in 1945—one of the six republics of the Federal People's Republic of Yugoslavia and into the Socialist Republic of Croatia — one of the republics of the Socialist Federal Republic of Yugoslavia in 1953. At this time all the Italian residents left the island.

After World War II, Lastovo experienced the same fate as the neighbouring island Vis. The island became a military region barred to foreign nationals. The barring of foreign nationals led to economic stagnation and the depopulation of the island. In 1988, the ban was lifted and foreign tourists were again allowed to visit the island. Croatia declared its independence from Yugoslavia in 1991, but the Yugoslav People's Army only left its bases on Lastovo, one of its last footholds in Croatia, in July 1992. The war in Croatia ended in 1995. Lastovo escaped much of the devastation that swept across some parts of Croatia and most of neighbouring Bosnia.

== Demographics ==
Population
Settlement/Year	1971	1981	1991 (Note: The 1991 Census figures included 234 people who no longer lived in the Lastovo municipality.)	2001	2011
Glavat	7	3	9	—	—
Lastovo	987	643	734	451	350
Pasadur	—	—	79	77	100
Skrivena Luka	12	18	20	18	33
Sušac	6	8	7	—	—
Uble	198	290	303	218	222
Zaklopatica	—	—	69	71	87
TOTAL	1210	962	1221	835	792

According to the 2011 census, the municipality of Lastovo has a population of 792 people living in 286 households, including 350 people living in Lastovo town. There are seven registered settlements on the island, two of which (the lighthouses at Sušac and Glavat) are no longer populated.

The average age of the people of the Lastovo municipality was 40 years old, slightly older than the national average of 39 years old. About 90% of the people of the Lastovo municipality are Roman Catholics and 95% are Croats. The highest level of education for 44% of the municipality was secondary school, for 13% it was college or university.

The island's population peaked at 1,738, in 1948, and has been in a steady decline since, due chiefly to emigration to mainland Croatia and abroad. The number of people who emigrated from the island between 1953 and 1991 exceeds its current population.

== Economy ==
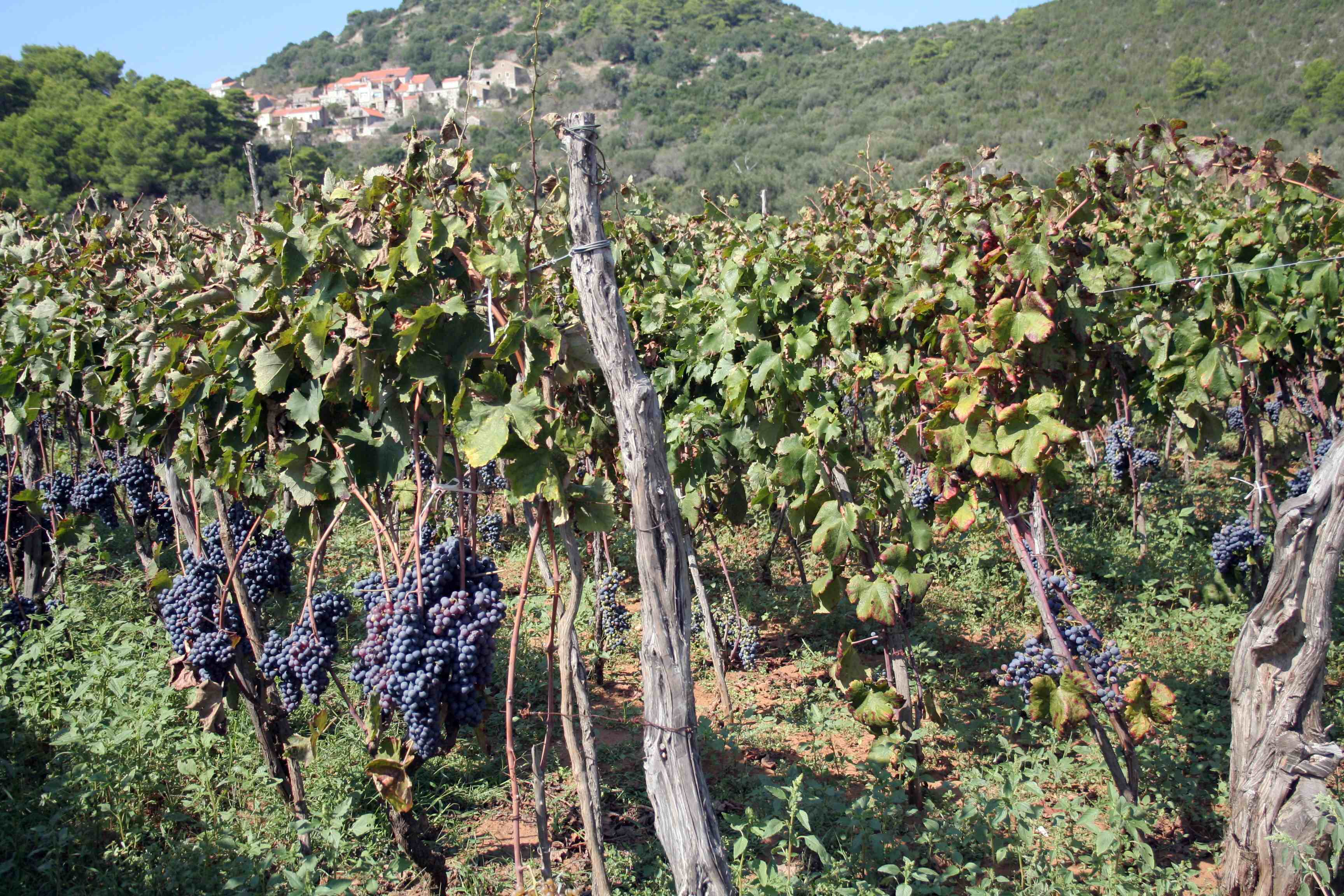
A Lastovo vineyard

Like many of the Mediterranean islands, the Lastovo economy is centred around agriculture and tourism. The 2003 Agricultural Census reported that the municipality had 57 ha (140 acres) of land used for agriculture. Of this 25 ha (62 acres) were vineyards and over 9000 olive trees grew in Lastovo. Following decades of isolation from foreigners, due to the Yugoslav People's Army activities and the Croatian War of Independence (1991–1995), the island has become attractive to tourists partly because it has remained largely undeveloped; even supplying the island with fresh water has been difficult.

== Culture ==
=== Poklad ===
A Pokladar shown in his traditional uniform

The most important event on the island is an authentic carnival that the locals call the Poklad. All the island residents participate by wearing folk costumes. The origins of the Lastovo carnival go back to a historical event. Legend has it that Catalan pirates attacked neighbouring Korčula and sent a Turkish messenger to Lastovo to tell the islanders to surrender or they would be next. The inhabitants of Lastovo did not let themselves be intimidated — instead they armed themselves and went on the attack. The women and children prayed to Sv. Jure (St. George) for help and their prayers were answered: a storm destroyed the pirates' ships and the inhabitants of Lastovo caught the messenger. In order to mock him, he was taken through the village on the back of a donkey and was afterwards sentenced and burned to death. This event is celebrated through the Poklad every year over a period of three days. The event takes place in the middle of February and since the summer 2006 it has become main attraction for tourists. Locals enjoy this event very much and Lastovci from all around Croatia return to Lastovo to attend the carnival.

=== Churches ===
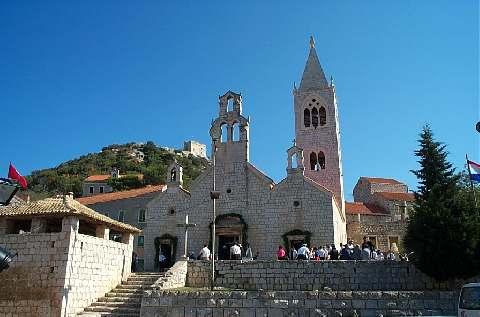
Church of Saints Cosmas and Damian

The main church is the Church of Saints Cosmas and Damian (Crkva sv. Kuzme i Damjana). It is situated in the oldest part of the square in the town of Lastovo and dates from the 14th century. On the main altar is the painting of Saint Cosmas and Damian. Out of the rest of the paintings Pieta, the work of an anonymous Venetian painter from 1545, can be distinguished. On its place there was a smaller church that dates back from 5th or 6th century. The church of Sv Vlaho (Saint Blaise) from the 12th century is on the entrance of the settlement. Beside it the chapel of Saint John was built in 1607, and around the church a defence wall and a tower.

On the graveyard on the southern edge is the little church of Saint Mary in the field from the 14th century and is considered as most attractive on the island. Near the ferry port in Ubli an archaeological find of the remains of a 6th-century church dedicated to Sv Petar (Saint Peter) are situated. Other churches of interest are Sv Luka (St Luke) built in the typical Croatian 11th-century sacral architecture, and Sv Jurje (St George) at Prežba also built in the 11th century, was demolished between the two World Wars. Another church called St Peter in Ubli built somewhere in the 11th–13th centuries was demolished by the Italians in 1933 to make way for extra fishing sheds. All together there are a total of 46 churches, making the number 46 omnipresent since the island also has 46 hills, covers 46 km^{2} (18 sq mi), has 46 fields, and contains 46 islands in the archipelago.

=== Architecture ===
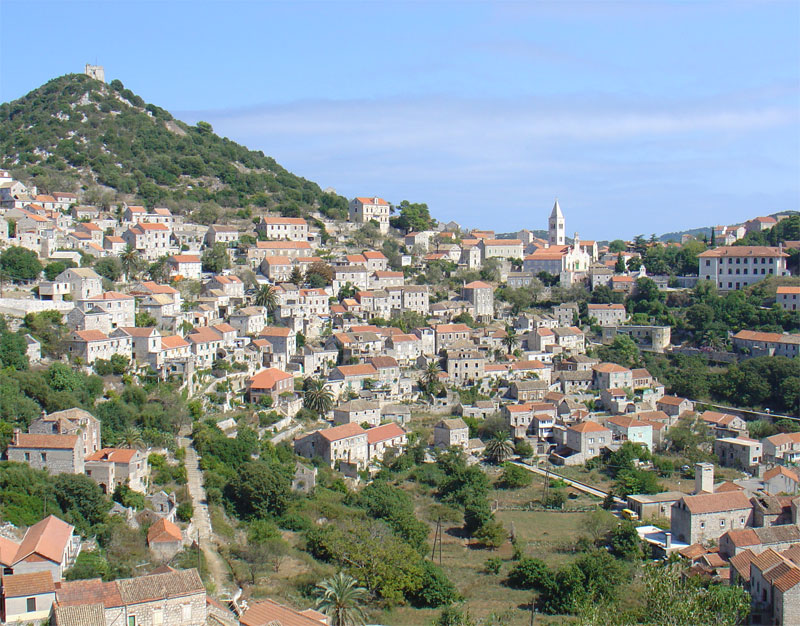
Town of Lastovo

The town's buildings date mainly from the 15th and 16th centuries when the construction of about 20 Renaissance houses redefined the village's appearance. Most of them have high broad terraces which have become the "trade mark" look of Lastovo houses. Their unusual cylindrical chimneys that the locals call fumari are picturesque and unusual since they look like miniature minarets, although there is no record of Arab or Turkish influence ever directly reaching this area. The ornate chimney on the 16th century Biza Antica house is probably the oldest preserved chimney in Dalmatia. The Struga lighthouse built in 1839 on Lastovo's southern tip near Skrivena Luka is one of the oldest lighthouses in Croatia.

=== Language ===
Inhabitants speak the Čakavian dialect of Croatian, maintaining a unique Jekavian, known as Southeastern Chakavian variant possibly due to the influence from hundreds of years of association within the Dubrovnik Republic and also due to the island's remoteness.

Before the year 1000 AD the population of the island (then called "Lagosta") was mainly made by romanised Dalmatians of the Dalmatian City-States. But the first mentioned inhabitants of Lastovo were recorded two centuries later in the 13th century Republic of Ragusa's archives and in the Statute of Lastovo, written in Italian and Latin: it clearly indicates that most of the population in that century had exclusively Croatian folk names. Only under Italian control in the 20th century, the island had again a majority of "neolatin' speakers but they disappeared after World War II.

For many centuries the only religion on the island has been Roman Catholicism, which has contributed to the preservation of the Latin names of certain settlements.

== Notable people ==
- Dobrić Dobričević (Bonino de Bonini), one of the pioneers of printing in Europe. He was born in 1454 and engaged in printing in Venice, Verona, Brescia and Lyon. He printed ancient classics by Tibullus, Catullus, Propertius, Virgil, Plutarch and Aesop, as well as Dante's Divine Comedy. His works were considered among the best examples of printing of his time. He died in Treviso in 1528.
- Tony Šantić is the owner of the racehorse Makybe Diva, a three-time winner of the Melbourne Cup, Australia's most prestigious horse race. Tony Šantić is also a successful tuna fisherman with large operations in South Australia and Croatia.

== See also ==
- Timeline of Croatian history
- Timeline of the Republic of Venice
- Battle of Lastovo (1000)
- List of protected areas of Croatia

== Sources ==
- Urbanistički institut Hrvatske (January 2010). "Prostorni plan uređenja Općine Lastovo – obrazloženje plana" [Lastovo Municipality Spatial Plan – Exposition of the Plan] (PDF) (in Croatian). Dubrovnik-Neretva County. Archived from the original on 18 July 2011.
- Jakl, Z.; Bitunjac, I.; Medunić-Orlić, G. (December 2009). "Nautical Tourism Development in the Lastovo Islands Nature Park" (PDF). European Commission.
