= Executive Committee of the 2nd Congress of the Communist Party of Yugoslavia =

2nd Executive Committee
- Emblem of the Communist Party of Yugoslavia

25 June 1920 – 22 May 1926 (5 years, 336 days) Overview
- Type: Political-executive organ
- Election: 1st Session of the Central Council of the 2nd Congress

Members
- Total: 9 members
- Newcomers: 6 members
- Old: 3 members (1st)
- Reelected: 2 members (3rd)

This electoral term of the Executive Committee was elected by the Central Council of the 2nd Congress of the Communist Party of Yugoslavia in 1920, and was in session until the complete ban on communist activities on 2 August 1921. While an underground leadership took over the party's activities, a new central leading organ of the Central Council was not elected until the immediate aftermath of the 3rd Congress in 1926.

== Members ==
Members of the executive committee of the 2nd Congress of the Communist Party of Yugoslavia
Name	1st EXE	3rd POL	Birth	Death	Nationality	Ref.
Dušan Cekić	New	Not	1879	1939	Serb	
Vladimir Ćopić	Old	Not	1891	1939	Croat	
Filip Filipović	Old	Not	1878	1938	Serb	
Jakov Lastrić	New	Not	1885	1938	Croat	
Dragomir Marjanović	New	Not	1880	1943	Serb	
Sima Marković	Old	Elected	1888	1939	Serb	
Vlada Mirić	New	Not	1885	1970	Serb	
Pavle Pavlović	New	Not	1888	1971	Serb	
Lazar Stefanović	New	Elected	1885	1950	Serb	

== Bibliography ==
- Cesarec, August (1971). Rasprave, članci, polemike: Nacionalni, socijalni i kulturni problemi Jugoslavije [Discussions, Articles, Polemics: National, Social and Cultural Problems of Yugoslavia] (in Serbo-Croatian). Zora.
- Dedijer, Vladimir (1981). Novi prilozi za biografiju Josipa Broza Tita [New Contributions to the Biography of Josip Broz Tito] (in Serbo-Croatian). Liburnija.
- Drachkovitch, Milorad (1973). Biographical Dictionary of the Comintern. Hoover Institution Press. ISBN 9780817984038.
- Haramina, Mijo; Drašković, Blagota (1962). Radnički pokret i socijalizam [Labor Movement and Socialism] (in Serbo-Croatian). Naprijed.
- Lob, Stefan (1988). Geschichte und Geschichten vom Werden der Kommunistischen Partei Jugoslawiens : soziologisch-ideologiekritische Studien unter besonderer Berücksichtigung des Zeitraums 1919–1922 [History and Stories of the Development of the Communist Party of Yugoslavia: Sociological-ideological-critical Studies with Special Emphasis on the Period 1919–1922] (in German). LIT Verlag.
- Pijade, Moša (1964). Izabrani spisi [Selected Writings] (in Serbo-Croatian). Vol. 1. Institut za izučavanje radničkog pokreta.
- Tito, Josip Broz (1984). Damjanović, Pero; Vujošević, Ubavka (eds.). Sabrana djela [Collected Works] (in Serbo-Croatian). Vol. 17. Komunist.
- Filipović, Filip; Kesić, Stojan (1987). Sabrana dela: Avgust 1916-Sredina Novembra 1919. godine [Collected Works: August 1916-Mid-November 1919] (in Serbo-Croatian). Institut za savremenu istoriju.
- Filipović, Filip; Kesić, Stojan (1987b). Sabrana dela: Sredina Novembra 1919-Kraj 1920 [Collected Works: Mid-November 1919-End 1920] (in Serbo-Croatian). Institut za savremenu istoriju.
- Ristović, Ljubiša; Kržavac, Savo (1974). Od prvog do desetog kongresa SKJ, 1919–1974 [From the First to the Tenth Congress of the LCY, 1919–1974] (in Serbo-Croatian). Institut za savremenu istoriju.
- Požar, Petar (1989). Jugoslaveni: žrtve staljinskih čistki dokumentarna kronika [Yugoslavs: The Documentary Chronicle if the Victims of Stalin's Purge] (in Serbo-Croatian). Nova knjiga.
