= Executive Committee of the 1st Congress of the Socialist Labour Party of Yugoslavia (Communists) =

1st Executive Committee
- Party emblem

23 April 1919 – 25 June 1920 (1 year, 63 days) Overview
- Type: Political-executive organ
- Election: 1st Session of the Central Council of the 1st Congress

Members
- Total: 9 members
- Reelected: 3 members (2nd)

This electoral term of the Executive Committee was elected by the Central Council of the 1st Congress of the Socialist Labour Party of Yugoslavia (Communists) in 1919, and was in session until the gathering of the 2nd Congress in 1920.

The exact membership of the Executive Committee is uncertain. Six members are disputed. For example, historians Stefan Lob, Petar Požar and Vladimir Dedijer conclude that Ivan Čolović, Dušan Pešić and Miloš Trebinjac were members. In contrast, one of the official history books of the party, the book From the First to the Tenth Congress of the LCY, 1919–1974, and the edited selected works of Filip Filipović, asserts that Miloš Ilić, Vasa Knežević and Gejza Brudnjak were members.

== Members ==
=== Certain ===
Members of the Executive Committee of the 1st Congress of the Socialist Labour Party of Yugoslavia (Communists)
Name	2nd EXE	Birth	Death	Nationality	Ref.
Vlada Bogdanović	Not	1888	1922	Serb	
Vladimir Ćopić	Elected	1891	1939	Serb	
Filip Filipović	Elected	1878	1938	Serb	
Negoslav Ilić	Not	1880	1954	Serb	
Sima Marković	Elected	1888	1939	Serb	
Živko Topalović	Not	1886	1972	Serb	

=== Uncertain ===
Members of the Executive Committee of the 1st Congress of the Socialist Labour Party of Yugoslavia (Communists)
Name	2nd EXE	Birth	Death	Nationality	Ref.
Gejza Brudnjak	Not	1882	1957	Croat	
Ivan Čolović	Not	1881	1930	Serb	
Miloš Ilić	Not	?	?	Serb	
Vasa Knežević	Not	?	?	Serb	
Dušan Pešić	Not	?	?	Serb	
Miloš Trebinjac	Not	?	?	Serb	

== Bibliography ==
- Cesarec, August (1971). Rasprave, članci, polemike: Nacionalni, socijalni i kulturni problemi Jugoslavije [Discussions, Articles, Polemics: National, Social and Cultural Problems of Yugoslavia] (in Serbo-Croatian). Zora.
- Dedijer, Vladimir (1981). Novi prilozi za biografiju Josipa Broza Tita [New Contributions to the Biography of Josip Broz Tito] (in Serbo-Croatian). Liburnija.
- Drachkovitch, Milorad (1973). Biographical Dictionary of the Comintern. Hoover Institution Press. ISBN 9780817984038.
- Haramina, Mijo; Drašković, Blagota (1962). Radnički pokret i socijalizam [Labor Movement and Socialism] (in Serbo-Croatian). Naprijed.
- Lob, Stefan (1988). Geschichte und Geschichten vom Werden der Kommunistischen Partei Jugoslawiens : soziologisch-ideologiekritische Studien unter besonderer Berücksichtigung des Zeitraums 1919–1922 [History and Stories of the Development of the Communist Party of Yugoslavia: Sociological-ideological-critical Studies with Special Emphasis on the Period 1919–1922] (in German). LIT Verlag.
- Pijade, Moša (1964). Izabrani spisi [Selected Writings] (in Serbo-Croatian). Vol. 1. Institut za izučavanje radničkog pokreta.
- Tito, Josip Broz (1980). The Party of the Revolution: Fifth Conference of the Communist Party of Yugoslavia, 1940. Socialist Thought and Practice.
- Filipović, Filip; Kesić, Stojan (1987). Sabrana dela: Avgust 1916-Sredina Novembra 1919. godine [Collected Works: August 1916-Mid-November 1919] (in Serbo-Croatian). Institut za savremenu istoriju.
- Ristović, Ljubiša; Kržavac, Savo (1974). Od prvog do desetog kongresa SKJ, 1919–1974 [From the First to the Tenth Congress of the LCY, 1919–1974] (in Serbo-Croatian). Institut za savremenu istoriju.
- Požar, Petar (1989). Jugoslaveni: žrtve staljinskih čistki dokumentarna kronika [Yugoslavs: The Documentary Chronicle if the Victims of Stalin's Purge] (in Serbo-Croatian). Nova knjiga.
