= Central Council of the 1st Congress of the Socialist Labour Party of Yugoslavia (Communists) =

1st Central Council
- Party emblem

23 April 1919 – 25 June 1920 (1 year, 63 days) Overview
- Type: Highest organ
- Election: 1st Congress

Members
- Total: 31 members
- Reelected: 11 members (2nd)

This electoral term of the Central Council was elected by the 1st Congress of the Socialist Labour Party of Yugoslavia (Communists) in 1919, and was in session until the gathering of the 2nd Congress in 1920.

== Composition ==
Members of the Central Council of the 1st Congress of the Socialist Labour Party of Yugoslavia (Communists)
Name	2nd	Birth	Death	Nationality	Gender	Ref.
Vlada Bogdanović	Elected	1888	1922	Serb	Male	
Gejza Brudnjak	Not	1882	1957	Croat	Male	
Stjepan Bublić	Not	1885	1965	Croat	Male	
Dušan Cekić	Elected	1879	1939	Serb	Male	
Vladimir Ćopić	Elected	1891	1939	Serb/Croat	Male	
Đuro Cvijić	Elected	1896	1938	Croat	Male	
Filip Filipović	Elected	1878	1938	Serb	Male	
Miloš Ilić	Not			Serb	Male	
Negoslav Ilić	Not	1880	1954	Serb	Male	
Jovo Jakšić	Not	1893	1971	Serb	Male	
Sreten Jakšić	Not	1888	1952	Serb	Male	
Vasa Knežević	Not			Serb	Male	
Ladislav Kordić	Elected	1885	1928	Croat	Male	
Panta Krekić	Not	1888	1935	Serb	Male	
Aleksandar Majder	Not				Male	
Sima Marković	Elected	1888	1939	Serb	Male	
Pavle Pavlović	Elected	1888	1971	Serb	Male	
Dragomir Pejić	Not				Male	
Ante Prkušić	Not			Croat	Male	
Mijo Radošević	Not	1884	1942	Croat	Male	
Franjo Raušer	Not	1879	1949	Muslim	Male	
Nikola Smoljanović	Not	1885	1926	Croat	Male	
Aleksandar Tajkov	Elected	1877	1941	Serb	Male	
Živko Topalović	Not	1886	1972	Serb	Male	
Mitar Trifunović	Elected	1880	1941	Muslim	Male	
Anton Veroneze	Not	1881	1939	Muslim	Male	
Stjepan Vidović	Not			Croat	Male	
Mihailo Vojinović	Not				Male	
Lazar Vukičević	Elected	1887	1941	Serb	Male	
Mojsije Zon	Not			Jewish	Male	

== Bibliography ==
- Cesarec, August (1971). Rasprave, članci, polemike: Nacionalni, socijalni i kulturni problemi Jugoslavije [Discussions, Articles, Polemics: National, Social and Cultural Problems of Yugoslavia] (in Serbo-Croatian). Zora.
- Drachkovitch, Milorad (1973). Biographical Dictionary of the Comintern. Hoover Institution Press. ISBN 9780817984038.
- Haramina, Mijo; Drašković, Blagota (1962). Radnički pokret i socijalizam [Labor Movement and Socialism] (in Serbo-Croatian). Naprijed.
- Pijade, Moša (1964). Izabrani spisi [Selected Writings] (in Serbo-Croatian). Vol. 1. Institut za izučavanje radničkog pokreta.
- Tito, Josip Broz (1980). The Party of the Revolution: Fifth Conference of the Communist Party of Yugoslavia, 1940. Socialist Thought and Practice.
- Filipović, Filip; Kesić, Stojan (1987). Sabrana dela: Avgust 1916-Sredina Novembra 1919. godine [Collected Works: August 1916-Mid-November 1919] (in Serbo-Croatian). Institut za savremenu istoriju.
