= Politburo of the 3rd Congress of the Communist Party of Yugoslavia =

3rd Politburo
- Emblem of the Communist Party of Yugoslavia

22 May 1926 – 15 November 1928 (2 years, 177 days) Overview
- Type: Political organ
- Election: 1st Session of the Central Committee of the 3rd Congress

Members
- Total: 9 members
- Newcomers: 6 members
- Old: 3 members (2nd)
- Reelected: 2 members (4th)

This electoral term of the Politburo was elected by the Central Committee of the 3rd Congress of the Communist Party of Yugoslavia (CPY) in 1926, and was in session until 13 April 1928. By a decision of the Executive Committee of the Communist International the Politburo was replaced by a Bureau of the CPY Central Committee, which remained active until the 4th Congress in 1928.

== Members ==
=== 1st Session of the Central Committee (1926–1928) ===
Members of the Politburo of the 3rd Congress of the Communist Party of Yugoslavia
Name	2nd EXE	3rd BUR	Birth	PM	Death	Nationality	Ref.
Đuro Cvijić	New	Not	1896	1919	1938	Croat	
Đuro Đaković	New	Elected	1886	1919	1929	Croat	
Rajko Jovanović	New	Not	1898	1919	1942	Serb	
Sima Marković	Old	Not	1888	1919	1939	Serb	
Đuro Salaj	New	Elected	1889	1919	1958	Croat	
Lazar Stefanović	Old	Not	1885	1919	1950	Serb	
Radomir Vujović	New	Not	1895	1925	1938	Serb	
Jakob Žorga	New	Not	1888	1919	1942	Slovene	

=== Bureau of the Central Committee (April–November 1928) ===
Members of the Bureau of the 3rd Congress of the Communist Party of Yugoslavia
Name	3rd POL	4th POL	Birth	PM	Death	Nationality	Ref.
Đuro Đaković	Old	Elected	1886	1919	1929	Croat	
Filip Filipović	Comeback	Not	1878	1919	1938	Serb	
Ivan Krndelj	New	Not	1888	1919	1941	Croat	
Đuro Salaj	Old	Elected	1889	1919	1958	Croat	

== Bibliography ==
- Babić, Nikola; Hadžirović, Ahmed (1977). 70 godina sindikalnog pokreta u Bosni i Hercegovini [70 Years of the Trade Union Movement in Bosnia and Herzegovina]. Council of the Federation of Trade Unions of Bosnia and Herzegovina. ISBN 9781538119617.
- Drachkovitch, Milorad (1973). Biographical Dictionary of the Comintern. Hoover Institution Press. ISBN 9780817984038.
- Haramina, Mijo; Drašković, Blagota (1962). Radnički pokret i socijalizam [Labour Movement and Socialism] (in Serbo-Croatian). Naprijed.
- Staff writer (1982). Godišnjak Društva istoričara SAP Vojvodine [Yearbook of the Society of Historians of SAP Vojvodina] (in Serbo-Croatian). Društvo istoričara SAP Vojvodine.
- Tito, Josip Broz (1980). The Party of the Revolution: Fifth Conference of the Communist Party of Yugoslavia, 1940. Socialist Thought and Practice.
- Tito, Josip Broz (1982). Damjanović, Pero; Vujošević, Ubavka (eds.). Sabrana djela: Oktobar 1940-April 1941 [Selected Works: 1940 – April 1941] (in Serbo-Croatian). Institut za savremenu istoriju.
- Zalar, Charles, ed. (1961). Yugoslav Communism: A Critical Study. United States Government Printing Office. Archived from the original on 11 June 2023.
