= Central Council of the 2nd Congress of the Communist Party of Yugoslavia =

2nd Central Council
- Emblem of the Communist Party of Yugoslavia

25 June 1920 – 22 May 1926 (5 years, 336 days) Overview
- Type: Highest organ
- Election: 2nd Congress

Members
- Total: 31 members
- Newcomers: 27 members (3rd)
- Old: 10 members (1st)
- Reelected: 5 members (3rd)

This electoral term of the Central Council was elected by the 2nd Congress of the Communist Party of Yugoslavia in 1920, and was in session until the gathering of the 3rd Congress in 1926.

== Composition ==
=== 2nd Congress: 1920–1922 ===
Members of the Central Council of the 2nd Congress of the Communist Party of Yugoslavia
Name	1st CC	1st CO	Birth	Death	Nationality	Gender	Ref.
Ivo Baljkas	New	Not	1892	1977	Croat	Male	
Vlada Bogdanović	Old	Not	1888	1922	Serb	Male	
Dušan Cekić	Old	Not	1879	1939	Serb	Male	
Ivan Čolović	New	Not	1881	1930	Serb	Male	
Vladimir Ćopić	Old	Not	1891	1939	Croat	Male	
Bogoljub Ćurić	New	Not	1895	1969	Serb	Male	
Đuro Cvijić	Old	Not	1896	1938	Croat	Male	
Đuro Đaković	New	Elected	1886	1929	Croat	Male	
Bogdan Eremić	New	Not	1880	1968	Serb	Male	
Filip Filipović	Old	Not	1878	1938	Serb	Male	
Jozef Hermal	New	Not	1891	1957	German	Male	
Lovro Klemenčič	New	Elected	1891	1928	Slovene	Male	
Ladislav Kordić	Old	Not	1885	1928	Croat	Male	
Obren Kosnić	New	Not	?	1927	Serb	Male	
Jakov Lastrić	New	Not	1885	1938	Croat	Male	
Đuro Lugarić	New	Not			Croat	Male	
Dragomir Marjanović	New	Not	1880	1943	Serb	Male	
Sima Marković	Old	Not	1888	1939	Serb	Male	
Vlada Marković	New	Not	1885	?	Serb	Male	
Života Milojković	New	Not	1888	1947	Serb	Male	
Vlada Mirić	New	Not	1885	1970	Serb	Male	
Pavle Pavlović	Old	Not	1888	1971	Serb	Male	
Paja Radišić	New	Not	1892	1971	Serb	Male	
Lazar Stefanović	New	Elected	1885	1950	Serb	Male	
Aleksandar Tajkov	Old	Not	1877	1941	Serb	Male	
Mitar Trifunović	Old	Not	1880	1941	Serb	Male	
Gojko Vuković	New	Not	1887	1934	Serb	Male	
Jovo Zlatović	New	Not	1876	1935	Croat	Male	

=== 1st Conference: 1922–1923 ===
Members of the Central Council of the 1st Conference of the Communist Party of Yugoslavia
Name	2nd CC	2nd CO	Birth	Death	Nationality	Gender	Ref.
Milorad Barajević	New	Not	1891	1951	Serb	Male	
Dragutin Bukvić	New	Not	1885	1960	Serb	Male	
Đuro Đaković	Old	Elected	1886	1929	Croat	Male	
Triša Kaclerović	Comintern	Elected	1879	1964	Serb	Male	
Slavko Kaurić	New	Comintern	1905	1942	Croat	Male	
Lovro Klemenčič	Old	Comintern	1891	1928	Slovene	Male	
Ljuba Radovanović	New	Not	1887	1964	Serb	Male	
Lazar Stefanović	Old	Not	1885	1950	Serb	Male	
Mihailo Todorović	New	Not	1889	1964	Serb	Male	

=== 2nd Conference: 1923–1924 ===
Members of the Central Council of the 2nd Conference of the Communist Party of Yugoslavia
Name	1st CO	3rd CO	Birth	Death	Nationality	Gender	Ref.
Đuro Cvijić	Comeback	Not	1896	1938	Croat	Male	
Đuro Đaković	Old	Not	1886	1929	Croat	Male	
Jozef Hermal	Comeback	Not	1891	1957	German	Male	
Triša Kaclerović	Old	Elected	1879	1964	Serb	Male	
Sima Miljuš	New	Elected	1894	1937	Serb	Male	
Vasilije Srzentić	New	Not	1895	1959	Serb	Male	
Jakob Žorga	New	Elected	1888	1942	Slovene	Male	

=== 3rd Conference: 1924–1926 ===
Members of the Central Council of the 3rd Conference of the Communist Party of Yugoslavia
Name	2nd CO	3rd CC	Birth	Death	Nationality	Gender	Ref.
Vladimir Ćopić	Comeback	Elected	1891	1939	Croat	Male	
Triša Kaclerović	Old	Not	1879	1964	Serb	Male	
Filip Filipović	Comeback	Elected	1878	1938	Serb	Male	
Sima Miljuš	Old	Not	1894	1937	Serb	Male	
Kosta Novaković	New	Elected	1886	1938	Serb	Male	
Lazar Stefanović	Comeback	Elected	1885	1950	Serb	Male	
Jakob Žorga	Old	Elected	1888	1942	Slovene	Male	

== Bibliography ==
- Babić, Nikola; Hadžirović, Ahmed (1977). 70 godina sindikalnog pokreta u Bosni i Hercegovini [70 Years of the Trade Union Movement in Bosnia and Herzegovina]. Council of the Federation of Trade Unions of Bosnia and Herzegovina. ISBN 9781538119617.
- Banac, Ivo (2018). With Stalin against Tito: Cominformist Splits in Yugoslav Communism. Cornell University Press. ISBN 978-1-5017-2083-3.
- Cesarec, August (1971). Rasprave, članci, polemike: Nacionalni, socijalni i kulturni problemi Jugoslavije [Discussions, Articles, Polemics: National, Social and Cultural Problems of Yugoslavia] (in Serbo-Croatian). Zora.
- Drachkovitch, Milorad (1973). Biographical Dictionary of the Comintern. Hoover Institution Press. ISBN 9780817984038.
- Haramina, Mijo; Drašković, Blagota (1962). Radnički pokret i socijalizam [Labor Movement and Socialism] (in Serbo-Croatian). Naprijed.
- Lane, A.T., ed. (1995). Biographical Dictionary of European Labor Leaders. Greenwood Press.
- Pijade, Moša (1964). Izabrani spisi [Selected Writings] (in Serbo-Croatian). Vol. 1. Institut za izučavanje radničkog pokreta.
- Očak, Ivan (1988). Afera Diamantstein: prvi antikomunistički proces u Kraljevstvu Srba, Hrvata i Slovenaca, (1919) [The Diamantstein Affair: The First Anti-Communist Trial in the Kingdom of Serbs, Croats and Slovenes (1919)] (in Serbo-Croatian). Vol. 1. Naprijed.
- Tito, Josip Broz (1980). The Party of the Revolution: Fifth Conference of the Communist Party of Yugoslavia, 1940. Socialist Thought and Practice.
- Tito, Josip Broz (1982). Damjanović, Pero; Vujošević, Ubavka (eds.). Sabrana djela: Oktobar 1940-April 1941 [Selected Works: 1940 – April 1941] (in Serbo-Croatian). Institut za savremenu istoriju.
- Tito, Josip Broz (1984). Damjanović, Pero; Vujošević, Ubavka (eds.). Sabrana djela [Collected Works] (in Serbo-Croatian). Vol. 17. Komunist.
- Filipović, Filip; Kesić, Stojan (1987). Sabrana dela: Avgust 1916-Sredina Novembra 1919. godine [Collected Works: August 1916-Mid-November 1919] (in Serbo-Croatian). Institut za savremenu istoriju.
- Filipović, Filip; Kesić, Stojan (1987b). Sabrana dela: Sredina Novembra 1919-Kraj 1920 [Collected Works: Mid-November 1919-End 1920] (in Serbo-Croatian). Institut za savremenu istoriju.
- Vujošević, Ubavka; Kovačev, Vujica, eds. (1983). Drugi (Vukovarski) kongres KPJ, 20-24. jun 1920: Plenarne sednice CPV KPJ, februar-decembar 1920 [Second (Vukovar) KPJ Congress, 20-24. June 1920: Plenary sessions of CPV KPJ, February-December 1920] (in Serbo-Croatian). Izdavački centar Komunist.
