= Lazar Stefanović =

Lazar Stefanović may refer to:

- Lazar Stefanovic (soccer) (born 2006), Canadian soccer player of Serbian descent
- Lazar Stefanović (basketball) (born 2002), Serbian basketball player
- Lazar Stefanović (politician) (1885–1950), Serbian communist, member of the Central Council of the 2nd Congress of the Communist Party of Yugoslavia and later highest organs of the party
