= Central Committee of the 3rd Congress of the Communist Party of Yugoslavia =

3rd Central Committee
- Emblem of the Communist Party of Yugoslavia

22 May 1926 – 15 November 1928 (2 years, 177 days) Overview
- Type: Highest organ
- Election: 3rd Congress

Members
- Total: 16 members
- Newcomers: 8 members (3rd)
- Old: 8 members (2nd)
- Reelected: 6 members (4th)

This electoral term of the Central Committee was elected by the 3rd Congress of the Communist Party of Yugoslavia in 1926, and was in session until the gathering of the 4th Congress in 1928.

== Composition ==
Members of the Central Committee of the 3rd Congress of the Communist Party of Yugoslavia
| Name | 3rd | 4th | Birth | PM | Death | Nationality | Gender | Ref. |
|---|---|---|---|---|---|---|---|---|
| Ivo Baljkas | Old | Not | 1892 | 1919 | 1977 | Croat | Male | |
| Đuro Cvijić | Old | Not | 1896 | 1919 | 1938 | Croat | Male | |
| Đuro Đaković | Old | Elected | 1886 | 1919 | 1929 | Croat | Male | |
| Filip Filipović | Old | Elected | 1878 | 1919 | 1938 | Serb | Male | |
| Dragotin Gustinčič | New | Not | 1882 | 1920 | 1974 | Slovene | Male | |
| Rajko Jovanović | New | Not | 1898 | 1919 | 1942 | Serb | Male | |
| Ivan Krndelj | New | Not | 1888 | 1919 | 1941 | Croat | Male | |
| Sima Marković | Old | Not | 1888 | 1919 | 1939 | Serb | Male | |
| Kosta Novaković | Old | Not | 1886 | 1919 | 1938/39 | Serb | Male | |
| Andrija Polgar | New | Not | 1891 | 1919 | 1941 | Hungarian | Male | |
| Đuro Salaj | Old | Elected | 1889 | 1919 | 1958 | Croat | Male | |
| Zlatko Šnajder | New | Not | 1903 | 1919 | 1931 | Croat | Male | |
| Lazar Stefanović | Old | Elected | 1885 | 1919 | 1950 | Serb | Male | |
| Gojko Vujović | New | Elected | 1887 | 1919 | 1934 | Serb | Male | |
| Radomir Vujović | New | Not | 1895 | 1925 | 1938 | Serb | Male | |
| Jakob Žorga | Old | Elected | 1888 | 1919 | 1942 | Slovene | Male | |

== Bibliography ==
- Babić, Nikola; Hadžirović, Ahmed (1977). 70 godina sindikalnog pokreta u Bosni i Hercegovini [70 Years of the Trade Union Movement in Bosnia and Herzegovina]. Council of the Federation of Trade Unions of Bosnia and Herzegovina. ISBN 9781538119617.
- Drachkovitch, Milorad (1973). Biographical Dictionary of the Comintern. Hoover Institution Press. ISBN 9780817984038.
- Haramina, Mijo; Drašković, Blagota (1962). Radnički pokret i socijalizam [Labour Movement and Socialism] (in Serbo-Croatian). Naprijed.
- Staff writer (1982). Godišnjak Društva istoričara SAP Vojvodine [Yearbook of the Society of Historians of SAP Vojvodina] (in Serbo-Croatian). Društvo istoričara SAP Vojvodine.
- Tito, Josip Broz (1980). The Party of the Revolution: Fifth Conference of the Communist Party of Yugoslavia, 1940. Socialist Thought and Practice.
- Tito, Josip Broz (1982). Damjanović, Pero; Vujošević, Ubavka (eds.). Sabrana djela: Oktobar 1940-April 1941 [Selected Works: 1940 – April 1941] (in Serbo-Croatian). Institut za savremenu istoriju.
- Zalar, Charles, ed. (1961). Yugoslav Communism: A Critical Study. United States Government Printing Office. Archived from the original on 11 June 2023.
