= 2nd Central Committee =

2nd Central Committee may refer to:

- Central Committee of the 2nd Congress of the Russian Social Democratic Labour Party, 1903–1905
- 2nd Central Executive Committee of the Chinese Communist Party, 1922–1923
- 2nd Central Committee of the Communist Party of Cuba, 1980–1986
- 2nd Central Committee of the Lao People's Revolutionary Party, 1972–1982
- 2nd Central Committee of the Workers' Party of Vietnam, 1951–1960
- Central Committee of the 2nd Congress of the Communist Party of Yugoslavia, 1920–1926
- 2nd Central Committee of the Workers' Party of Korea, 1948–1956
