= Vladimir Ćopić =

Yugoslav revolutionary, politician, and journalist (1891–1939)

Vladimir "Senjko" Ćopić
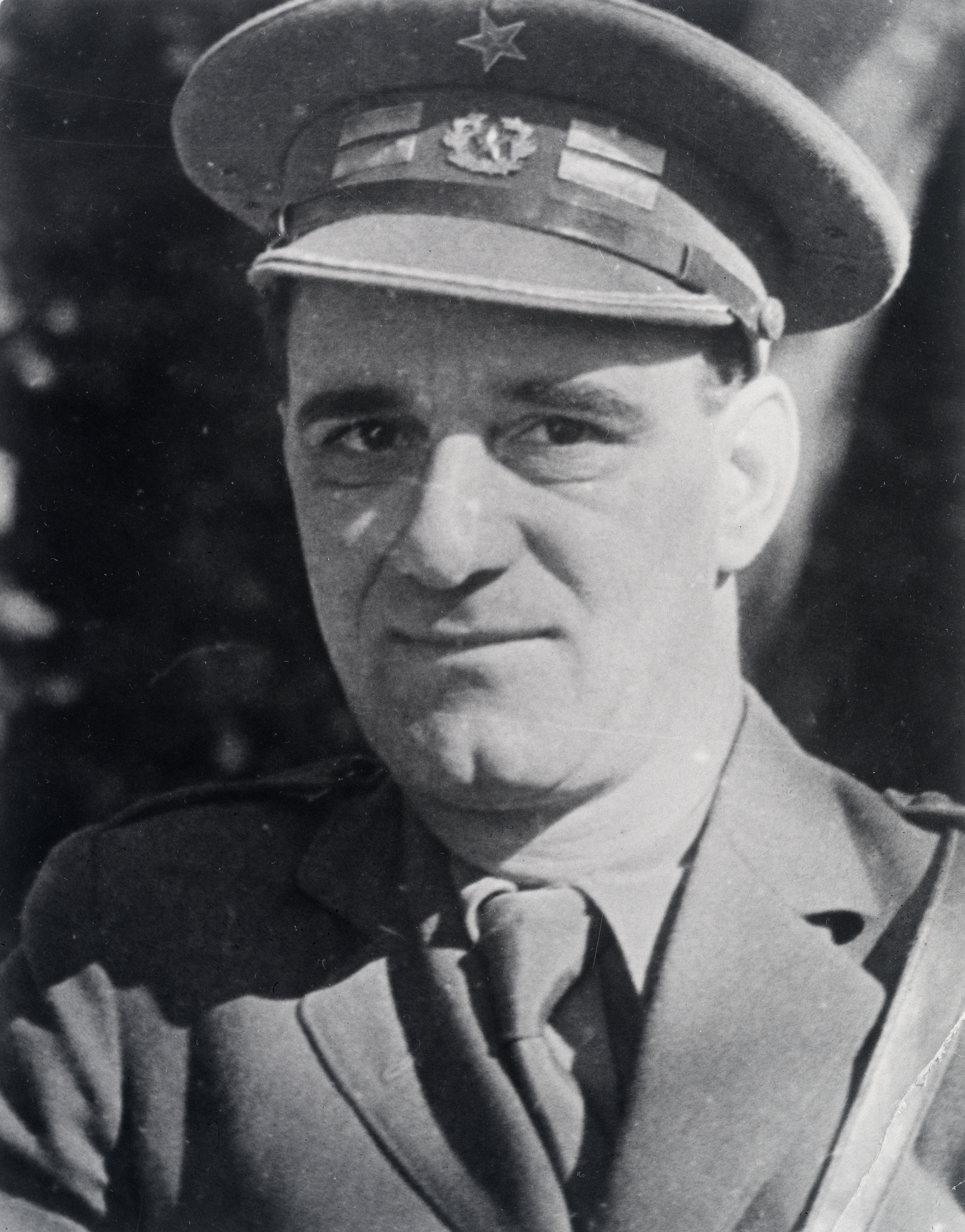
- Ćopić c. 1937–1938
- Born: Vladimir Ćopić; 8 March 1891; Senj, Austria-Hungary (now Croatia)
- Died: 19 April 1939 (aged 48); Moscow, Soviet Union
- Cause of death: Executed during Great Purge
- Alma mater: Faculty of Law, University of Zagreb
- Military career
- Allegiance: Austria-Hungary; Russian SFSR; Spanish Republic
- Branch: Austro-Hungarian Army; Red Army; International Brigades
- Service years: 1914–1915; 1918; 1937–1938
- Rank: Sergeant (Austro-Hungarian Army); General (International Brigades)
- Units: 79th Lika Regiment (Austro-Hungarian Army); XV International Brigade
- Commands: XV International Brigade (1937–1938)
- Conflicts: World War I; Eastern Front; Carpathian Front; Russian Civil War; Spanish Civil War; Battle of Jarama; Battle of Belchite; Battle of Brunete

Vladimir "Senjko" Ćopić (8 March 1891 – 19 April 1939) was a Yugoslav revolutionary, politician, journalist and, as organizational secretary, the second in command of the Communist Party of Yugoslavia from April 1919 to August 1920.

== Early life ==
=== Childhood ===
Vladimir Ćopić was born on 8 March 1891 in Senj to Jovan "Jovo" Ćopić and Amalija Ćopić (née Lončarić). His father descended from the village of Suvaja in Lika and was an ethnic Serb, and his mother hailed from an old Croatian merchant family of Senj. Jovo Ćopić was a clerk in Lika, while in Senj he initially worked as a tailor and later on at the local Orthodox church. Vladimir was the second youngest of nine children, the last three of which were baptized Eastern Orthodox.

After graduating from a public elementary school in Senj, Ćopić enrolled at the Senj Gymnasium in 1901. During his time there, he was awarded a stipend by a foundation from Gospić. Ćopić was an average student and was held back in the fourth grade due to a conflict with one of his professors. During high school, he was a supporter of the Croatian nationalist Party of Rights. In April 1909, Ćopić organized his class to attend a memorial service at the Church of St Francis to Croatian nobles Zrinski and Frankopan, executed by the Habsburgs in 1671 in the Magnate conspiracy. Attending the event was strictly forbidden by the school as "anti-dynastic" and "anti-Austrian", and the students were sternly reprimanded with lowered grades in discipline.

=== Student activism ===
In the autumn of 1910, Ćopić enrolled at the Faculty of Law in Zagreb. Despite retaining his stipend from the foundation, he worked during his studies, first as a manual laborer and later as an office worker. At the university, Ćopić started a friendship and correspondence with his professor, Izidor Kršnjavi. During his studies, Ćopić was still politically active as a Starčević supporter, and was friends and roommates with future high-ranking Ustaše member Mile Budak. In November 1910, soon after arriving in Zagreb, Ćopić attended the general assembly of the Starčevićist Academic Youth where he was made deputy councilor while Budak became the first secretary.

In March 1912, he was an organizer of the pupil's strike against Ban Slavko Cuvaj. On 8 June 1912, former law student Luka Jukić attempted to assassinate Cuvaj in front of an inn where Ćopić was sitting with Budak and Ante Pavelić. He was arrested for this event along with Jukić, Đuro Cvijić and August Cesarec. Ćopić was soon freed due to a lack of evidence. On 4 December 1913, he was voted a member of the board of the Starčevićist magazine Mlada Hrvatska (Young Croatia). Ćopić was also the president of the "Kumičić" Academic Club. Both of these served as fronts for the Party of Rights, which Ćopić would later denounce.

== World War I ==
=== Conscription and captivity ===
In July 1914, Ćopić's studies were interrupted and he was conscripted to fight in World War I. He was initially called for training in Sušak in the Jelačić Regiment of the Austro-Hungarian army, where he stayed until the early fall. Ćopić then served as a cadet in the military barracks in Prague. By late 1914, with three of Ćopić's brothers also conscripted, his family was in a dire financial situation. On 5 January 1915, he joined the 79th Lika Regiment where his material condition improved.

During his 6 months in Prague, Ćopić was initially critical of the local Czechs' lack of enthusiasm for the war. However, his contacts with the Czechs and frequent incidents of anti-Slavic sentiment from his commanders made him an opponent of the war and eventually the monarchy. Increasingly seen as politically unreliable, Ćopić was sent from unit to unit. He finally ended up in the majority Hungarian 31st Jäger Regiment fighting on the Carpathian Front on 24 March 1915. Ćopić was a sergeant in command of a squad which would end up surrendering to the Imperial Russian Army on 8 April.

After spending a short while in a POW camp in eastern Ukraine, Ćopić was transferred to a camp in Tashkent. There, he acquainted himself with the writings of Leo Tolstoy and was called an anarchist. He also read his first Marxist theory during this time and became a convinced Bolshevik. In November 1915, the Serbian Royal Military Mission in Russia requested that the Russian government allow the formation of a volunteer detachment from captured Yugoslav fighters. Ćopić arrived in Odesa on 13 March 1916 to join the Serbian volunteer detachment, but was returned to captivity for refusing to swear an oath to King Peter because of his Yugoslavist and revolutionary beliefs. He was held in a camp in Bobrov from October 1917 to March 1918.

=== October Revolution ===
After the October Revolution, Ćopić would start agitating for the Soviet government among his fellow POWs. On 29 March 1918, Ćopić was allowed freedom of travel by the military-revolutionary committee of the Bobrov Soviet of Soldiers, Workers and Peasants. He would use this to advocate among the prisoners for joining the Red Army in the Russian Civil War. At the time, Ćopić contended with a group of Czechoslovaks in the camp who were advocating joining the Czechoslovak Legion. Already in early April, he was traveling to and from Moscow to work in the Revolutionary Committee of Prisoners of War. There, he also briefly worked at the headquarters of the 4th Army.

On 16 May, Ćopić was one of the founders of the Yugoslav Communist Group along with Vukašin Marković and Lazar Vukičević. He was named a member of the Central Committee of the group on 15 July and became its secretary on 20 July. In the newly formed party, he was tasked with translation and distribution of Bolshevik literature to South Slavs. He translated several works by Vladimir Lenin. Ćopić also worked in journalism and often wrote in the magazine Svjetska revolucija (World Revolution), printed in Moscow in his native language.

At the behest of the Yugoslav Communist Group, the People's Commissariat for Nationalities led by Joseph Stalin opened a department for South Slavs in late June 1918. The department was concerned with the affairs of Yugoslav captives who weren't party members. The president of the department was Vukašin Marković and on 15 August, Ćopić was made vice president and would act on Marković's behalf in his absence. Ćopić and Marković disagreed on the treatment of Yugoslav captives, with Marković advocating their execution in case of Lenin's death and Ćopić advocating against it in light of their poverty and low education. During this time, Ćopić would also come into disagreement with Marković due to the latter's advocacy for a Balkan Federation. The department would temporarily replace the Serbian military mission and royal consulate.

In early September, Ćopić was dispatched as part of a commission tasked with investigating anti-Bolshevik agitators in battalions staffed by Serbo-Croatian speakers. The commission surveyed the fighters in Saratov, Tsaritsyn and Astrakhan. Their task was completed successfully, and the Astrakhan unit was dissolved and reformed. Ćopić returned to Moscow on 15 October and became president of the Yugoslav Communist Group on 25 October 1918.

On 5 November, the Yugoslav communists in Moscow decided to form the Communist Party (Bolsheviks) of Serbs, Croats and Slovenes. The new party leadership was chosen on 7 November, with Lazar Vukičević becoming president and Ćopić his vice president. The party was tasked primarily with inserting its members back into Yugoslavia and would go on to influence the formation and ideological orientation of the Communist Party of Yugoslavia. Ćopić left for Zagreb in November, traveling via Smolensk, Minsk, Warsaw, Berlin and Austria with two other party members. He reached Zagreb in December 1918.

== Communist Party of Yugoslavia ==
=== Return to Yugoslavia ===
After returning to Zagreb in December 1918 with fellow Bolshevik Nikola Kovačević, Vladimir resided with his brother Milan Ćopić, a sergeant at the time, in the Sisters of Charity Hospital. His brother's military rank made his activities inconspicuous to the authorities for a while. Immediately, he established contacts with the left wing of the former Social Democratic Party of Croatia and Slavonia. The first communist groups in Zagreb based on the principles of the Russian Bolsheviks were formed already in December. During this time, Ćopić collaborated with left-wing writers August Cesarec and Miroslav Krleža, as well as later leading party members Simo Miljuš and Đuro Cvijić. Members of the group dispersed to their hometowns to form chapters throughout the region. However, the former leadership of the Social Democratic Party was opposed to their ideas.

From Zagreb, Ćopić went to his hometown of Senj, where he agitated among the local Bolshevik-adjacent social democrats, and tried to unite their organizations in the area in mid-January. During the month of January, Interior Minister Svetozar Pribićević wrote to the local police in Croatia on two occasions to arrest Ćopić at the border, unaware that he was already in the country. His activities around Senj ultimately led to his arrest on 21 January. He was soon released, only to be arrested again on 10 February, but not before establishing contact with Filip Filipović, who had also recently returned to the country with the same goal of forming a communist party.

=== Unification Congress ===
Apart from Filipović's group which operated in Serbia and Bosnia, and Ćopić's and Kovačević's group which operated in Croatia and Slavonia, a third group of Yugoslav communists returned in February 1919 under the leadership of Nikola Grulović and Lazar Vukičević. They had continued the activities of the Yugoslav group in Russia, but were misinformed about Ćopić and Kovačević's agitation in Yugoslavia, being led to believe that they had united with the local social democrats. For this reason, they returned to form the Yugoslav Communist Revolutionary Alliance "Pelagić", or "Pelagićevci". The group adopted the name of 19th-century revolutionary Vasa Pelagić.

The Pelagićevci were formally constituted on 27 February in Stražilovo, after which they elected an executive committee on 9 March. Ćopić was made part of the committee, though he was unable to join this meeting. The group adopted the platform that they would refuse to cooperate with the local social democrats until they agreed on the necessity of establishing a dictatorship of the proletariat. They operated mainly in Vojvodina, where they spread literature and pamphlets, especially the Budapest-based Crvena Zastava (English: Red Banner) which they imported from the recently formed Hungarian Soviet Republic starting in early April. Filipović's and Ćopić's networks of communist cells had both partial organizational ties to each other, as well as to the Pelagićevci. This led to the formation of a "troika" of agitators in the run-up to the formation of the Communist Party, which was led by Ćopić, Filipović and Kovačević, with Vukičević and Đuro Đaković as their deputies.

From 20 to 23 April 1919, the Unification Congress was held in Belgrade. The congress served to unite the Serbian Social Democratic Party, the left wing of the Social Democratic Party of Croatia and Slavonia, the Social Democratic Party of Bosnia-Herzegovina and the Pelagićevci into a new communist party. Ćopić participated in the congress, having recently been released from prison due to Cvijić's connection to police commissioner Srđan Budisavljević. He was one of the 30 Croatian delegates, and one of the 10 Pelagićevci, along with Nikola Kovačević. The Pelagićevci were the furthest left group at the congress, and insisted on a strictly Bolshevik program, leading to the departure of moderate delegates. At the Unification Congress, the Socialist Labor Party of Yugoslavia (Communists), later to be renamed the Communist Party of Yugoslavia, was formed. A Central Committee was elected with Ćopić becoming organizational secretary, the second in command in the party after political secretary Filip Filipović.

=== Diamantstein Affair ===
Ćopić was first summoned to court in Belgrade on 26 May 1919. He was kept in jail for one night, after which he was told he'd be sent to Senj. Instead, he was put under arrest in Zagreb, where he remained jailed without charges for several months. During this time, Ćopić remained in correspondence with his former professor, Izidor Kršnjavi.

While Ćopić was in jail, the party was preparing an uprising which was to take place on 21 July. Through his brother, sergeant Milan Ćopić, Vladimir Ćopić established contact with captain Josip Metzger and Alfred Diamantstein, who arrived to Zagreb under the orders of the Hungarian Soviet Republic. Metzger was to activate his network in the army to aid the uprising, while the party set up their own Red Guards under the command of Simo Miljuš. These units were established in Slavonski Brod, Osijek, Vrdnik, Đurđevac and Subotica. Metzger's units were supplied by the Hungarian Soviet Republic through Diamantstein. Party cells in Serbia and Bosnia were organized through Filip Filipović, and in Slovenia through Ante Ciliga. The entire plan was orchestrated by Ćopić who communicated through coded messages which he passed to his brother Milan and several other party members through his cell window.

On 21 and 22 July, a general strike broke out in defense of the Hungarian Soviet Republic and Soviet Russia. Armed uprisings broke out in Maribor on 22 July and in Varaždin on 23 July, while in Osijek the uprising was prevented. Mass arrests were carried out in late July and especially in early August. Diamantstein was arrested in late July and proved to be the crown witness of the prosecution. Due to his testimony, which outlined all parts of the plan in great detail, 65 communists and sympathizers were prosecuted. The case came under public scrutiny and was followed closely by Miroslav Krleža, who attended court proceedings as a journalist reporting for the magazine Istina. The magazine was also implied in Diamantstein's testimony as being financed by Hungary, but Krleža was never prosecuted. Ćopić pleaded not guilty and continued to defend his support for the Hungarian Soviet Republic which he claimed was carried out solely through legal means.

The trial was postponed for several months to further public outcry, after which Ćopić and Miljuš initiated a six-day hunger strike requesting to either appear in court or for their charges summarily dropped. Their trial commenced in April 1920 in front of a military court in Zagreb. After a nine-day trial, Ćopić, as well as virtually all other party members, was acquitted due to the prosecution basing their charges largely on Diamantstein's testimony and lacking more concrete evidence. However, several of the accused would later write that Diamantstein's testimony was largely truthful.

=== Vukovar Congress ===
After his acquittal, Ćopić immediately resumed his activities in the party. Starting in April, polemics were held through the party newspaper Radničke novine (Workers' Journal) between the centrist Marxists led by Živko Topalović and the revolutionary faction. Ćopić published several articles during this time in defense of the latter faction. In late April, he participated in organizing a railroad workers' strike. The strikers were joined by Belgrade dockworkers and miners from Trbovlje. Ćopić frequently traveled between Zagreb and Belgrade to coordinate the strikes.

The second congress of the Socialist Labor Party of Yugoslavia (Communists) was held in Vukovar from 20 to 24 June 1920. Ćopić was an organizer of the congress, along with several other participants of the Russian revolution and former Pelagićevci, and served as its technical secretary. The congress featured a split between the revolutionary wing led by Ćopić and Filip Filipović, the centrist Marxists or centrumaši led by Živko Topalović and the social democrats led by Dragiša Lapčević. The revolutionaries were successful and the reformist factions were expelled, while the now renamed Communist Party of Yugoslavia adopted the program of the Third International. Ćopić was again elected organizational secretary of the party, as well as its representative in the Balkan Communist Federation, an umbrella organization with representatives of all Balkan communist parties.

=== Constitutional Assembly ===
At the Vukovar Congress, the Communist Party of Yugoslavia agreed to participate in the Constitutional Assembly elections which were held on 28 November 1920. Ćopić was at the top of the ballot in two constituencies, the counties of Modruš-Rijeka and Lika-Krbava. He was elected into the assembly from the constituency of Modruš-Rijeka, with over half of all votes in Crikvenica, Selce and Grižane.

Following the formation of a Communist Party parliamentary club, Ćopić was elected secretary of the club, with Triša Kaclerović serving as president. However, the party didn't participate in the assembly from late December until late January 1921. During this time, the government of Milenko Vesnić issued the Obznana, a proclamation outlawing communist activities. Ćopić delivered his first speech in front of the assembly on 12 May 1921 at the 28th regular session where he criticized the former Serbian envoy to the Russian Empire, Miroslav Spalajković.

On 30 June, shortly after the assassination attempt on Regent Alexander by former Pelagićevci member Spasoje Stejić, the Communist Party's seats in parliament were revoked. This led to the indictment of Ćopić, Stejić, Nikola Kovačević, Filip Filipović, and 11 other party members, many of whom were Russian Civil War veterans and former Pelagićevci.

=== Trial and incarceration ===
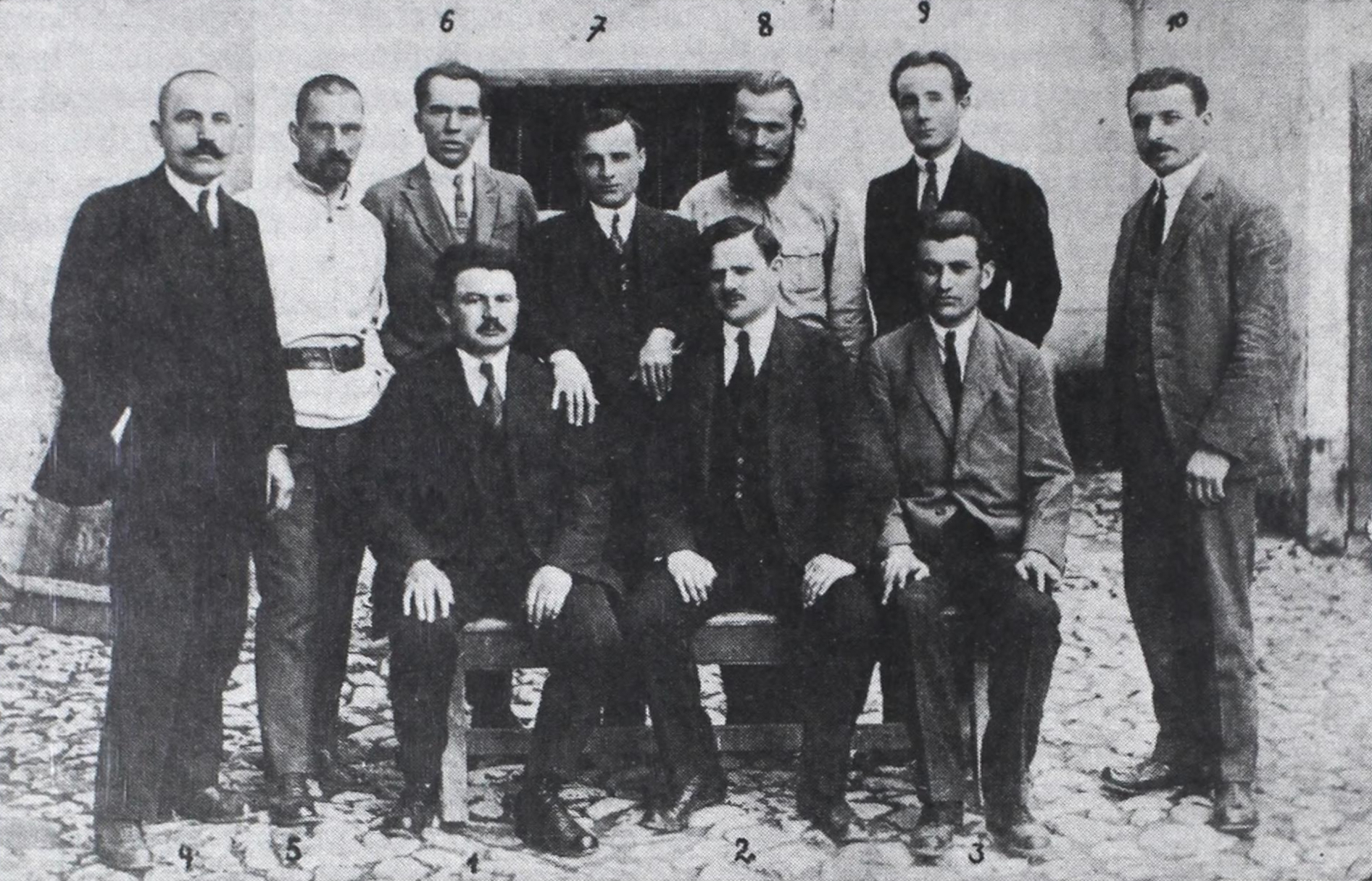
Members of the leadership and former members of parliament from the Communist Party of Yugoslavia in the prison in Požarevac in 1922. Ćopić is standing second from the left.

Following the assassination attempt, Ćopić, Filipović, and Nikola Kovačević were promptly arrested and held in custody in Čukarica while awaiting trial. They were charged with inciting Spasoje Stejić to commit the crime, several days before the attempt took place. Under the guidance of lawyer Dragiša Vasić, Ćopić's defense presented an alibi, leading to his acquittal for the attempted assassination. However, on 25 January 1922, he was sentenced to 2 years in prison for the separate charge of engaging in communist propaganda.

Ćopić, Nikola Kovačević and Đuro Salaj served their sentence in the Požarevac penitentiary. A year later, Filip Filipović and Sima Marković were also transferred to Požarevac. During their time in prison, Ćopić translated A Short Course of Economics Science by Alexander Bogdanov. They remained in communication with high-ranking party members through three women who registered as their fiancées. Upon their release on 3 September 1923, the trio of Ćopić, Kovačević, and Filipović was welcomed by a crowd of supporters organized by Moša Pijade, Rajko Jovanović, and Bora Prodanović. The trio, now free, proceeded to Vasa Pelagić's grave, where they laid a wreath, paying their respects to the late Pelagić, who had also been incarcerated in the Požarevac penitentiary and died there in 1899.

=== Regional secretary ===
During Ćopić's incarceration, the Communist Party of Yugoslavia was formally banned following the assassination of Interior Minister Milorad Drašković. Despite this, the party persisted in operating covertly and established a legal front known as the Independent Workers' Party of Yugoslavia (NRPJ) in early 1923. In September 1923, Ćopić assumed the role of regional secretary for Croatia and Slavonia within the NRPJ.

This period saw a schism within the party, dividing members into the so-called left and right factions. The rift centered around the national and agrarian issues, particularly the question of allying with separatist and agrarian parties. The left faction supported such alliances, while the right faction opposed them. Prominent members of the left faction included Đuro Cvijić, August Cesarec, Kosta Novaković, Ante Ciliga, Rajko Jovanović and Moša Pijade, among others, while the right faction was led by Sima Marković. In late 1923, polemics ensued between the two factions in preparation of the third congress of the now underground CPY, with Ćopić largely aligning himself with the left faction.

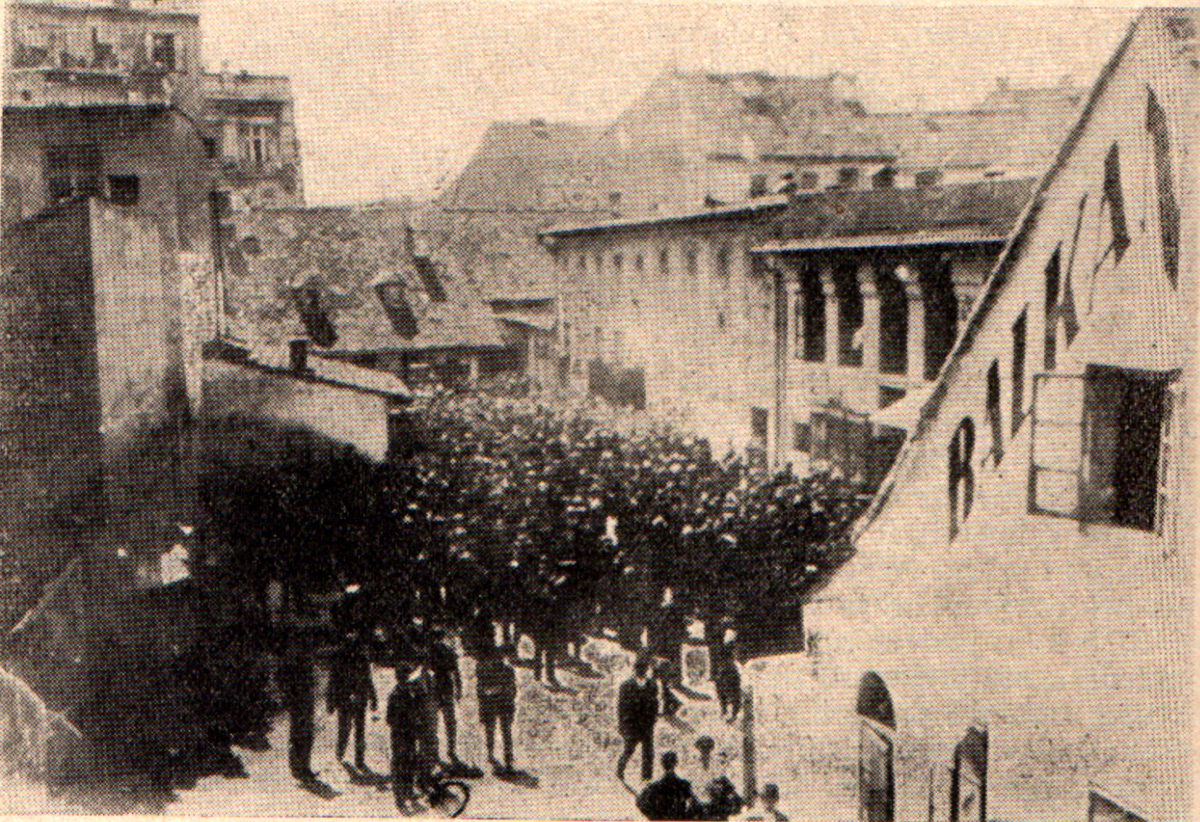
In 1924, Ćopić organized the 1 May protests in Zagreb, held in front of Cinema Balkan.

In January 1924, a referendum was conducted among NRPJ members, with the majority opting for the left faction. Simultaneously, the third congress of the CPY convened in Belgrade from 1 to 4 January, culminating in the victory of the left faction. There, Ćopić secured a position on the executive committee of the central party council of the CPY, becoming regional secretary for Croatia and Slavonia within the CPY, a position he also held within the NRPJ.

Assuming the role of regional secretary, Ćopić assumed the responsibilities of the editor in chief for the Zagreb-based magazine Borba. He was credited as the editor in chief for 25 issues published between 6 March and 10 July 1924. During this time, he also translated texts from Lenin and Joseph Stalin. Notably, Ćopić organized the 1 May protests in Zagreb in front of the cinema Balkan, drawing attendance from several thousand workers.

In June 1924, Ćopić illegally departed from Yugoslavia to participate in the fifth congress of the Communist International held in Moscow. Accompanying him were Triša Kaclerović, Filip Filipović, and others. Faced with a ban on leaving the country, they crossed the border on foot from the town of Maribor to Austria, while writer Miroslav Krleža transported their luggage to Vienna by train. Throughout the congress, occurring from 17 June to 8 July, Ćopić actively engaged, operating for the first time under the pseudonym "Senjko", a homage to his hometown of Senj.

== Life in Moscow ==
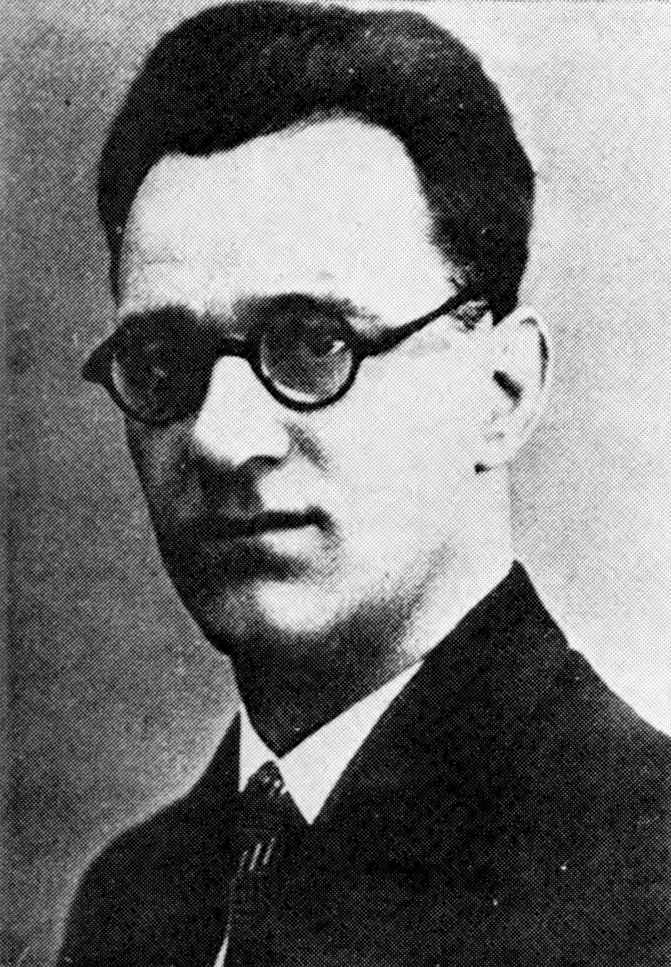
Ćopić c. 1930

Under the name of 'Senko', he was a leading member of the Yugoslav Communist Party in Moscow.

== Spanish Civil War ==
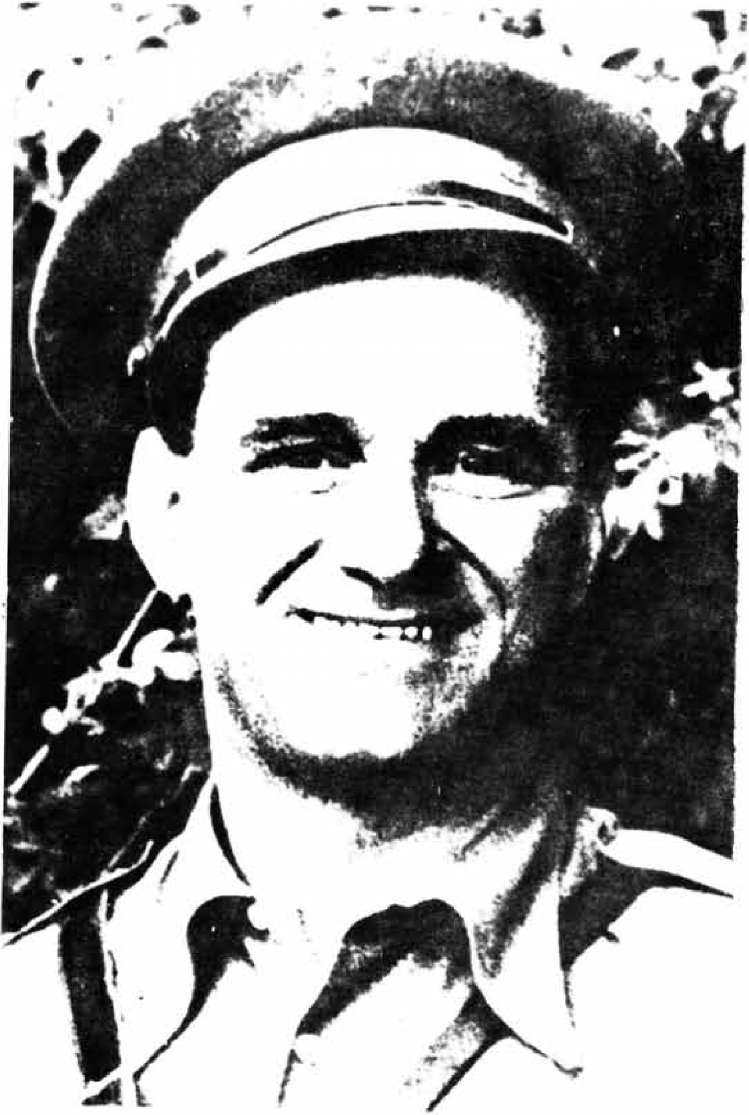
Ćopić during the Spanish Civil War c. 1937–1939

In February 1937, Colonel Gal was promoted to General to command a division and was replaced as commander and political commissar of the XV International Brigade by Ćopić. He was one of the highest ranking Yugoslav volunteers in the war.

On the Battle of Jarama, the official report by Ćopić of fighting on 12 February, barely mentioned the appalling level of casualties under his command, but focused on the 'staunch heroism' of his troops repelling 'violent fascist attacks causing heavy losses on the enemy'. The final act of the Battle was the futile attack by the Lincoln Battalion on 27 February. The battalion commander, Captain Robert Hale Merriman begged Ćopić (described as "rather inept") not to launch the attack fearing slaughter. Ćopić insisted it proceed and promised air and armoured support, which never came. Merriman was almost immediately wounded and the Battalion suffered 136 deaths.

In August 1937 at the Battle of Belchite, he tasked Peter Daly's unit with capturing the town of Quinto and they were commanded on 25 August to capture Purburrel Hill, a height south of the town, on which 500 Rebel troops were entrenched behind barbed wire and concrete pill-boxes. Finding themselves unsupported and outnumbered against the defenders, the unit took heavy casualties and Peter Daly was wounded in the abdomen. Daly was taken away for aid while Paddy O'Daire took charge refusing the orders of his superior, Ćopić, to continue the suicidal attack, keeping his men dug in on the exposed hillside until nightfall and safe withdrawal. On the 26 August O'Daire, this time supported by the XV International Brigade's anti-tank battery, succeeded in breaking the enemy lines, leading to the capture of 300 troops.

By April 1938 Spanish communist leaders wanted the replacement of many International Brigade commanders due to poor performance, and although André Marty disagreed, he had to compromise and General Walter and Ćopić were replaced.

== Death ==
Following the end of the war and Republicans' defeat, he was recalled to Moscow. Due to his alleged Trotskyist views regarding communist governance, he was killed in Stalinist purges in 1939 along with many other leading Yugoslav communists in the country.

== Personal life ==
Ćopić was an amateur musician and avid chess player.

His brother, Milan Ćopić, was in the International Brigades' prison at Camp Lucász.

== References and sources ==
=== Sources ===
- Očak, Ivan (1980). Vojnik revolucije: život i rad Vladimira Ćopića (in Croatian). Zagreb: Spektar.
- Kovačev, Vujica (1987). Na zajedničkom frontu revolucije : veza između jugoslovenskih i mađarskih komunista 1918-1919. i učešće Jugoslovena u mađarskoj revoluciji 1919. godine (in Serbian). Belgrade: Institut za savremenu istoriju.
- Eby, Cecil D. (2007). Comrades and Commissars. University Park, PA: Pennsylvania State University Press. ISBN 9780271029108.
- Thomas, Hugh (2012). The Spanish Civil War (50th Anniversary ed.). London: Penguin Books. ISBN 978-0-141-01161-5.
- Baxell, Richard (2014). Unlikely Warriors. London: Aurum Press. ISBN 978-1-78131-233-9.
- Clifford, Alexander (2020). Fighting for Spain. Yorkshire: Pen & Sword Military. ISBN 978-1-52677-438-5.
- Beevor, Antony (2001). The Spanish Civil War. London: Cassell Military Paperbacks. ISBN 0-304-35840-1.
- Požar, Petar (1989). Jugoslaveni - žrtve staljinskih čistki (in Serbian). Belgrade: Nova knjiga.
- Vujošević, Ubavka (2019). Nestajali netragom: Jugosloveni - žrtve političke represije i staljinističkih čistki u Sovjetskom Savezu 1927-1953 (in Serbian). Belgrade: Institut za savremenu istoriju. ISBN 978-86-7403-229-9.
