= Milan Ćopić =

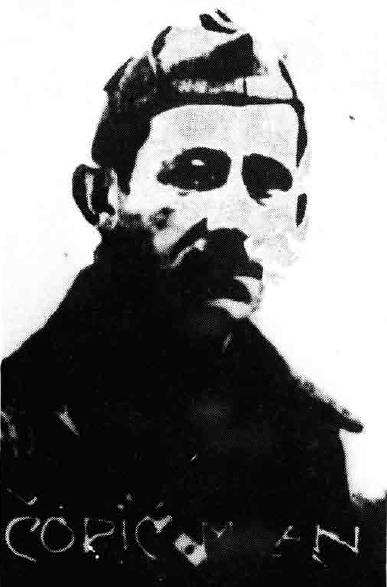
- Born: 4 December 1897; Senj, Croatia-Slavonia, Austria-Hungary (now Croatia)
- Died: 1941 (aged 43–44)
- Military career
- Allegiance: Austria-Hungary; Spanish Republic
- Branch: International Brigades
- Service years: 1936–1941
- Nickname: Emil
- Commands: XV International Brigade
- Conflicts: Spanish Civil War

Milan Ćopić (4 December 1897 – 1941) was a Yugoslav Croatian communist who was in the International Brigades prison at Camp Lucász during the Spanish Civil War.

He was the brother of Lt. Col. Vladimir Ćopić, commander of the XV International Brigade.

Having arrived in Spain on 11 November 1936, he was the director of the disciplinary prison of the International Brigades in Castelldefels (Barcelona). He was accused of extrajudicial executions and torture. He was tried by Republic in 1938 and sentenced to death, but the sentence was perhaps not executed due to the interference by his brother.

Ćopić died in 1941 in an unknown location, presumably a Nazi concentration camp, having been arrested in France that year.

== See also ==
- Vladimir Ćopić
- Castelldefels Castle
