= Vukašin Marković =

Montenegrin activist (1874–1943 or 1944)

- Вукашин Марковић
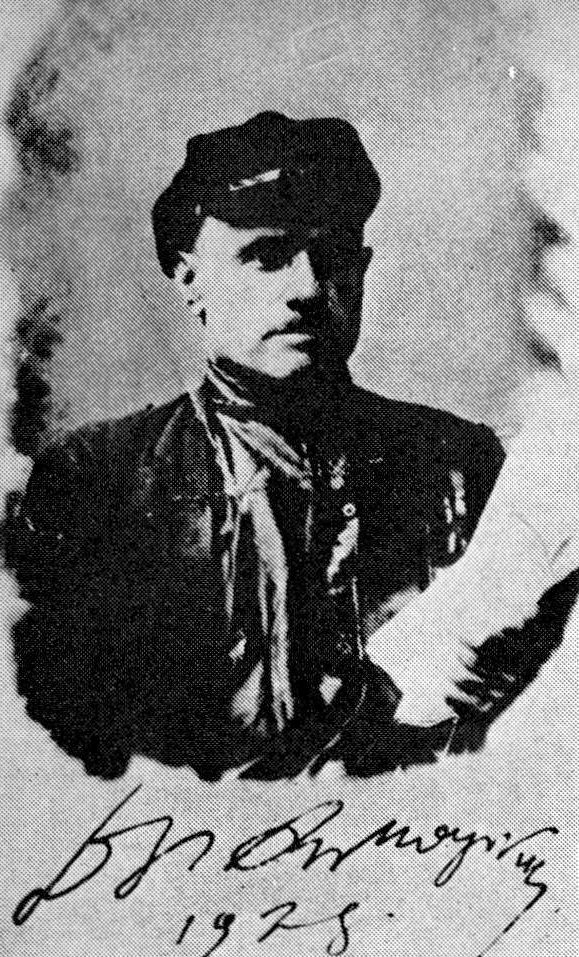
- Vukašin Marković in 1928
- Born: 12 August 1874; Stijena, Podgorica, Principality of Montenegro
- Died: 1943 or 1944 (aged 68, 69 or 70); Kazan or Saratov, RSFSR, Soviet Union
- Education: Jagodina Lower Gymnasium; Don Theological Seminary
- Alma mater: Kharkov Veterinary Institute
- Known for: Leading an armed insurgency in Montenegro
- Movement: Bolshevism

Vukašin Marković (Serbian Cyrillic: Вукашин Марковић; 12 August 1874 – 1943 or 1944) was a Montenegrin communist and revolutionary who participated in the 1905 Russian Revolution, as well as the October Revolution. After returning to Montenegro in 1921, Marković led a guerilla unit fighting for a Montenegrin republic.

He returned to Moscow in 1926, and was arrested during the Great Purge, though not charged. He was held in a psychiatric hospital in Kazan, and died in 1943 or 1944.

== Early life ==
Vukašin Marković was born in the village of Stijena near Podgorica on 12 August 1874. He grew up in a humble household working in agriculture. His family belonged to the tribe of Piperi.

After graduating from the lower gymnasium in Jagodina, Marković moved to Russia in 1892. There, he graduated from the Don Theological Seminary in Novocherkassk, after which he studied veterinary and internal medicine in Kharkiv at the Kharkov Veterinary Institute.

== Agitation in Russia ==
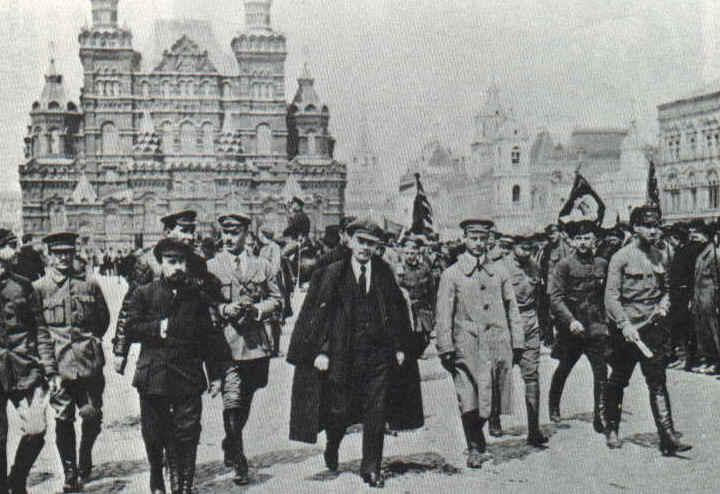
Marković (third from the left, hand-in-waistcoat gesture) with Lenin and other comrades inspecting Red Guards on the Red Square in 1919

Marković was a member of the Russian Social Democratic Labour Party (Bolsheviks) from 1903. He participated in the 1905 Russian Revolution.

During World War I, Marković served as a military doctor in the Šumadija Division of the Royal Serbian Army from 1914. He served in the Serbian Sandžak Division from September 1915 and participated in the Great Retreat, after which he returned to Russia in 1916.

After returning to Russia, he participated in the October Revolution and was an agitator among captured POWs. He was one of the founders and leading members of the Yugoslav Communist Group within the Russian Communist Party (Bolsheviks). Marković was the editor of the magazine Svetska revolucija (World Revolution) which was printed in Moscow in the Russian, Slovene, Serbo-Croatian and Bulgarian languages. In addition to that, he served as president of the department of South Slavs in the Commissariat of Peoples in 1918, and worked in the Comintern on questions concerning the Balkans in 1919. In late 1919, he served as a lector and agitator in the All-Russian Central Executive Committee.

== Insurgency in Montenegro ==
After returning to Yugoslavia in 1921, Marković planned to start an uprising and proclaim a "Soviet Montenegro". After agitating among the villagers in his srez, where he worked as a doctor, he was immediately arrested and transferred to Belgrade in July 1921. He was released after having spent one month in prison and returned to his family home in Stijena, on the condition that he was banned from participating in agitation and spreading propaganda.

Soon after, he tried to lead an armed uprising of the Piperi and Bjelopavlići tribes, under the slogan "All Power to the Soviets", attacking nearby gendarme stations. Due to a lack of coordination, a part of his rebels surrendered. After that, he set up base in a nearby forest, beginning his guerilla campaign. He spent almost three years in the forests of Montenegro, campaigning against national oppression and reactionary policies in the Kingdom of Yugoslavia. He supported a federal Yugoslavia, with Montenegro as one of its constituent republics. Due to their shared goals and overlapping time frame, Ivo Banac calls his campaign a "Red form of the Green insurgency".

Having been promised amnesty in the spring of 1924, Marković surrendered to the authorities. He was deceived and was arrested three days later, after which he was subjected to torture and spent a year jailed by the Cetinje court in an insane asylum in Šibenik. Marković escaped on 19 or 20 April 1925 with the help of a group of Croatian doctors. He spent several months living in the caves of Montenegro, unable to work or leave the country. Milan Gorkić and a member of Marković's guerilla group, Bracan Bracanović, wrote to the Balkan Secretariat of the Comintern to aid in his escape. They describe Marković as a popular fighter "especially against Serbian oppression".

== Return to Russia ==
Marković finally fled to Austria with the help of the Communist Party of Yugoslavia, where he spent several months before reaching the Soviet Union. He escaped from a prison in Vienna with the help of the Committee for the Defense of Victims of the White Terror in the Balkans, led by Henri Barbusse. He arrived in Moscow on 6 September 1926 and was soon awarded the title of political emigrant, as well as Soviet citizenship. Physically and psychologically drained, he was instructed to take a long leave to rest and recuperate.

Marković associated with the Old Bolsheviks and got a job at the "Sickle and Hammer" metallurgical plant in Moscow in 1931. He retired already in early 1932. He wrote occasionally, but his main activities were political. He wrote often to Joseph Stalin and other Soviet leaders, urging them to address bureaucratic irregularities and other problems in Soviet companies and society. In one discussion within a Yugoslav emigrant group, Marković had courage to publicly disagree with Stalin's assessment of the economic depression in the capitalist world, as his listeners stood petrified. He was also an instructor in the Comintern working with the Chinese Communist Party.

In 1933, Marković's mental state deteriorated and he was sent to a mental hospital in Saratov. He returned to Moscow in 1936, from where he called on Yugoslav emigrants to aid in the Spanish Civil War on 14 March 1937. Several weeks later, his proclamation was printed by the Chicago-based Slobodna reč.

== Arrest and death ==
As a target of the Great Purge, Marković was arrested on 6 May 1937, but charges were not brought against him. By the order of a Special Council of the NKVD, he was sent to mandatory treatment at the Kazan Psychiatric Hospital on 27 June 1937, diagnosed with paranoid schizophrenia. There, he was interred from 9 January 1938 to 8 January 1943, when he was transferred to another psychiatric hospital in Kazan.

It is unknown whether he died that year in Kazan, or at a later date in Saratov, where a source claims he was interred in a psychiatric hospital for milder cases in 1944.
