= Ivo Baljkas =

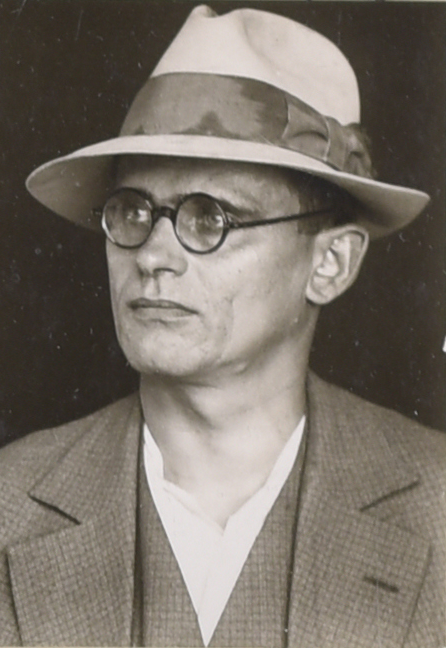
Ivo Baljkas in 1928.

Ivo Baljkas (born 28 May 1892 in Šibenik – 17 March 1977 in Zagreb) was a Yugoslav communist from Croatia. He joined the League of Communists of Yugoslavia (LCY) in 1919, and was a member of the party leadership in Dalmatia from 1920 onwards. He served in the LCY Central Committee during the 1920s but was eventually expelled from the party on charges of factional activities. From 1929 to 1939, he lived in South America, but he returned to Yugoslavia in 1939 and rejoined the party that same year. He was also re-expelled later that year. From 1941 to 1943, Baljkas was interned in a prison camp in Italy. Upon the war's end, he returned to Yugoslavia and worked in the editorial office of Vjesnik in Zagreb.

== Bibliography ==
- Tito, Josip Broz (1980). Cengle, Franc; Strugar, Novak; Borozan, Đorđe (eds.). The Party of the Revolution: Fifth Conference of the Communist Party of Yugoslavia, 1940. Belgrade, SFR Yugoslavia: Socialist Thought and Practice.
