= Lazar Vukičević =

Serbian activist (1887–1941)

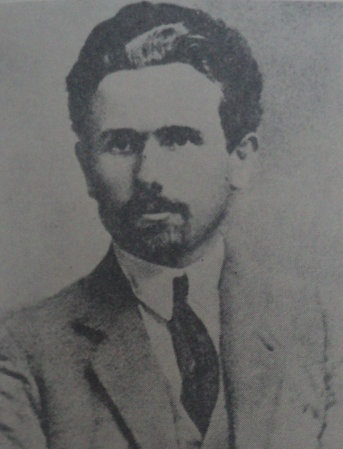
- Born: 15 October 1887; Sombor, Austria-Hungary
- Died: 17 December 1941 (aged 54); Belgrade, Territory of the Military Commander in Serbia
- Occupations: Typesetter, publicist and politician

Lazar Vukičević (Serbian Cyrillic: Лазар Вукичевић; 15 October 1887 – 17 December 1941), sometimes styled Vukićević, was a Serbian typesetter, publicist and politician. He was a participant in the October Revolution and Hungarian Revolutions, a founder of the Communist Party of Yugoslavia and member of its first Central Committee.

== Early life ==
Lazar Vukičević was born in on 15 October 1887 in Sombor to Petar and Jelena Vukičević (née Cvejić).

== Activities in Bosnia and Herzegovina ==
Vukičević joined the communist movement working as a typesetter in Vojvodina. He moved to Sarajevo where he helped launch the publication Glas slobode (Voice of Freedom) and served as part of its editorial staff. He participated in the establishment of the Social Democratic Party of Bosnia–Herzegovina in 1909 and was a member of its main board until 1910.

== Activities in Vojvodina ==
Vukičević moved back to Vojvodina and was a leading member of the Serbian-Bunjevac Agitation Committee in the Social Democratic Party of Hungary. He was part of the editorial board of its publications Napred (Forward) and Sloboda (Freedom) from 1911 to 1914.

== Russian Revolution ==
During World War I, he was captured by the Imperial Russian Army. He was freed following the October Revolution and joined the Russian Communist Party (Bolsheviks), serving as part of its Yugoslav Group. In Samara, he published the journal Internacionalist (Internationalist). Following the formation of the Communist Party (Bolsheviks) of Serbs, Croats and Slovenes in 1918, Vukičević served as part of its central committee until 1919.

== Unification congress in Yugoslavia ==
After returning to Yugoslavia in February 1919, Vukičević assisted in the formation of the Yugoslav Communist Revolutionary Union "Pelagić", named after 19th century revolutionary Vasa Pelagić. He was part of its leading circle, along with later high-ranking Yugoslav politician and fellow participant of the October Revolution, Nikola Grulović. Grulović and Vukičević formed the so-called Pelagićevci on 9 March 1919 and led the group during the April 1919 unification congress of the Socialist Labor Party of Yugoslavia (Communist), later renamed the Communist Party of Yugoslavia. The Pelagićevci advocated for a hard line Bolshevik party during the congress.

== Activities in the Hungarian Soviet Republic and Vienna ==
Vukičević was persecuted for his communist activities in Yugoslavia, and left to participate in the Hungarian Soviet Republic in 1919. There, he was the editor of a publication named Crvena zastava (The Red Flag). After the fall of the republic, he left Hungary and moved to Vienna, where he worked with fellow ethnic Yugoslav and Hungarian communists. Vukičević left the republic joined by Ivan Matuzović, after which they both joined a students' group that included Ognjen Prica, who was studying in Vienna at the time.

== Return to Yugoslavia ==
Vukičević returned to Belgrade in 1923. There, he opened a book store and publishing house called Svetlost (Light), located in the Ilija M. Kolarac Endowment.

== Death ==
Following the occupation of Yugoslavia, Vukičević was captured by the Gestapo and sent to the Banjica concentration camp on 31 October 1941. He was sentenced to death by firing squad and was killed at Banjica on 17 December 1941. He was survived by his wife, Toska.
