= MF Liburnija =

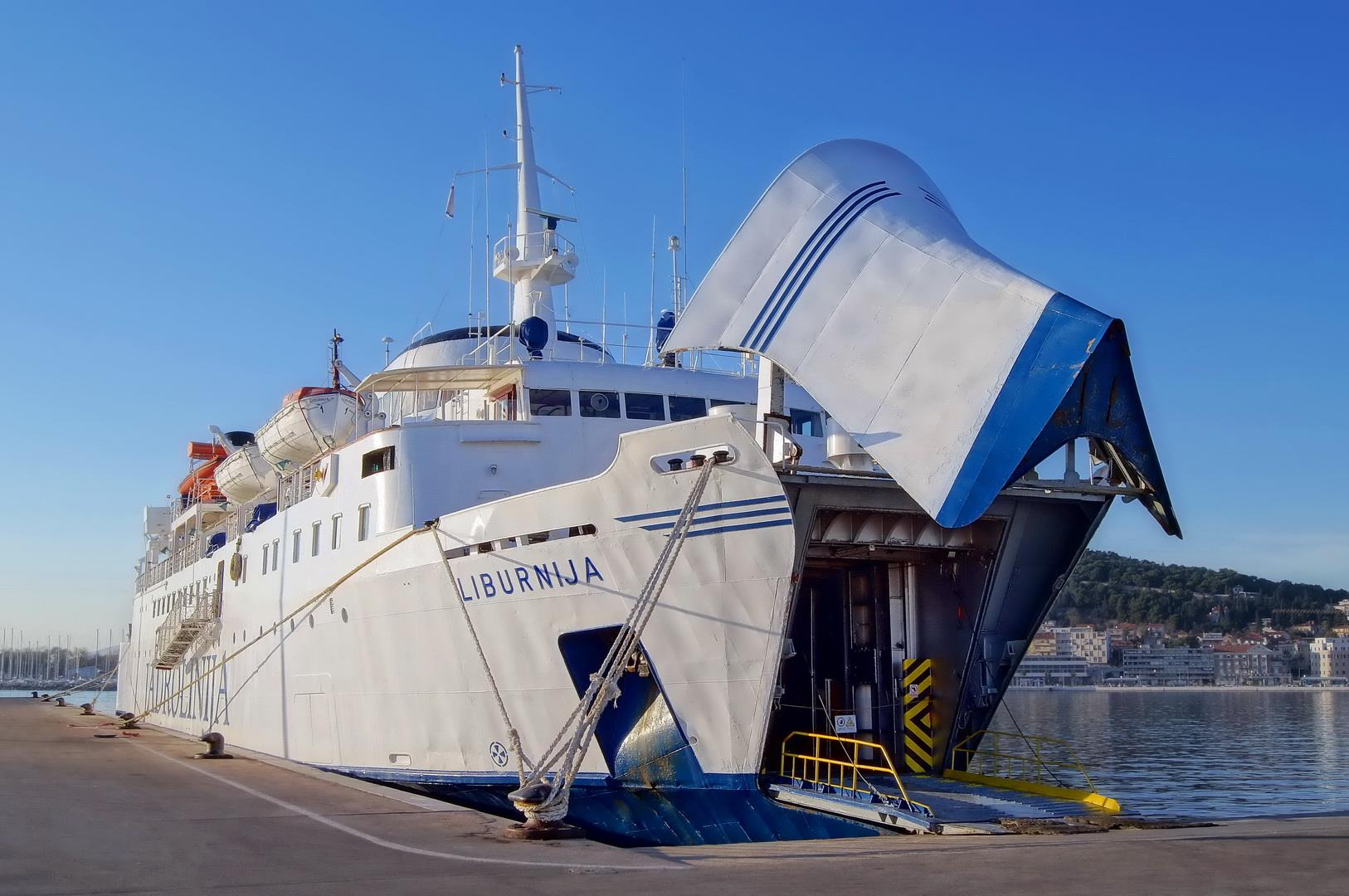
- MF Liburnija as seen in Split on December 15, 2013

History
- Name: 1965 onwards: Liburnija
- Owner: Jadrolinija, Croatia
- Operator: Jadrolinija, Croatia
- Port of registry: Rijeka, Croatia
- Builder: NV Scheepswerf & Machinefabriek "De Merwede" Van Vliet & Co, Hardinxveld, Netherlands
- Yard number: 582
- Launched: 16 March 1965
- Out of service: April 2015
- Identification: IMO number: 6511350
- Fate: Scrapped in April 2015 in Aliağa, Turkey

General characteristics
- Tonnage: 3190 GT (1466 NT)
- Length: 89.33 m
- Beam: 16.22 m
- Height: 5.35 m
- Draught: 4.22 m
- Speed: 15 kn
- Capacity: 671 passengers; 93 cars

MF Liburnija was a ferry owned by Croatian shipping company Jadrolinija, built in 1965 by the NV Scheepswerf & Machinefabriek "De Merwede" Van Vliet & Co, Hardinxveld, Netherlands for Jadrolinija. She entered service from Yugoslavia to Greece and Italy. There were 73 passenger cabins with 182 beds in total, a restaurant for 192 people, the so-called avio-bar for 50 people, a bar for 44 and a lounge for 91 people.

The ship most recently served a coastal line from Rijeka to Dubrovnik as well as some lines between Italy and Croatia. On April 2, 2015, the Liburnija set off on her final voyage from Mali Lošinj to Aliağa, İzmir Province, Turkey for scrapping.
