= LIT Verlag =

German academic publisher

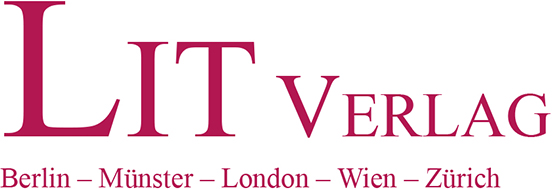
- Founded: 1980
- Country of origin: Germany
- Headquarters location: Münster
- Publication types: Books
- Official website: www.lit-verlag.de

LIT Verlag or Lit Verlag is a German academic publisher founded in 1980. Its managing director is Wilhelm Hopf. Its principal place of publication is Münster; further publishing offices are located in Berlin, Vienna, Hamburg, London, Zurich, and New York City. It publishes approximately 800 books per year. It generally publishes in the areas of theology, social sciences, humanities, economics, and political science.
