= Yugoslav Communist Group =

The Yugoslav Communist Group was an organization of Yugoslav revolutionaries in Russia, who had adopted a communist ideology. The group was affiliated to the Federation of Foreign Groups of the Russian Communist Party (Bolsheviks). The organization began publishing the newspaper Revolucija in 1917.

The group was represented by Ilija Milkić at the founding congress of the Communist International in March 1919. Milkić participated as a consultative delegate. At the time of the congress of the Communist International, the Yugoslav Communist Group had 112 members.
