= Đuro Cvijić =

Serbian mathematician and communist

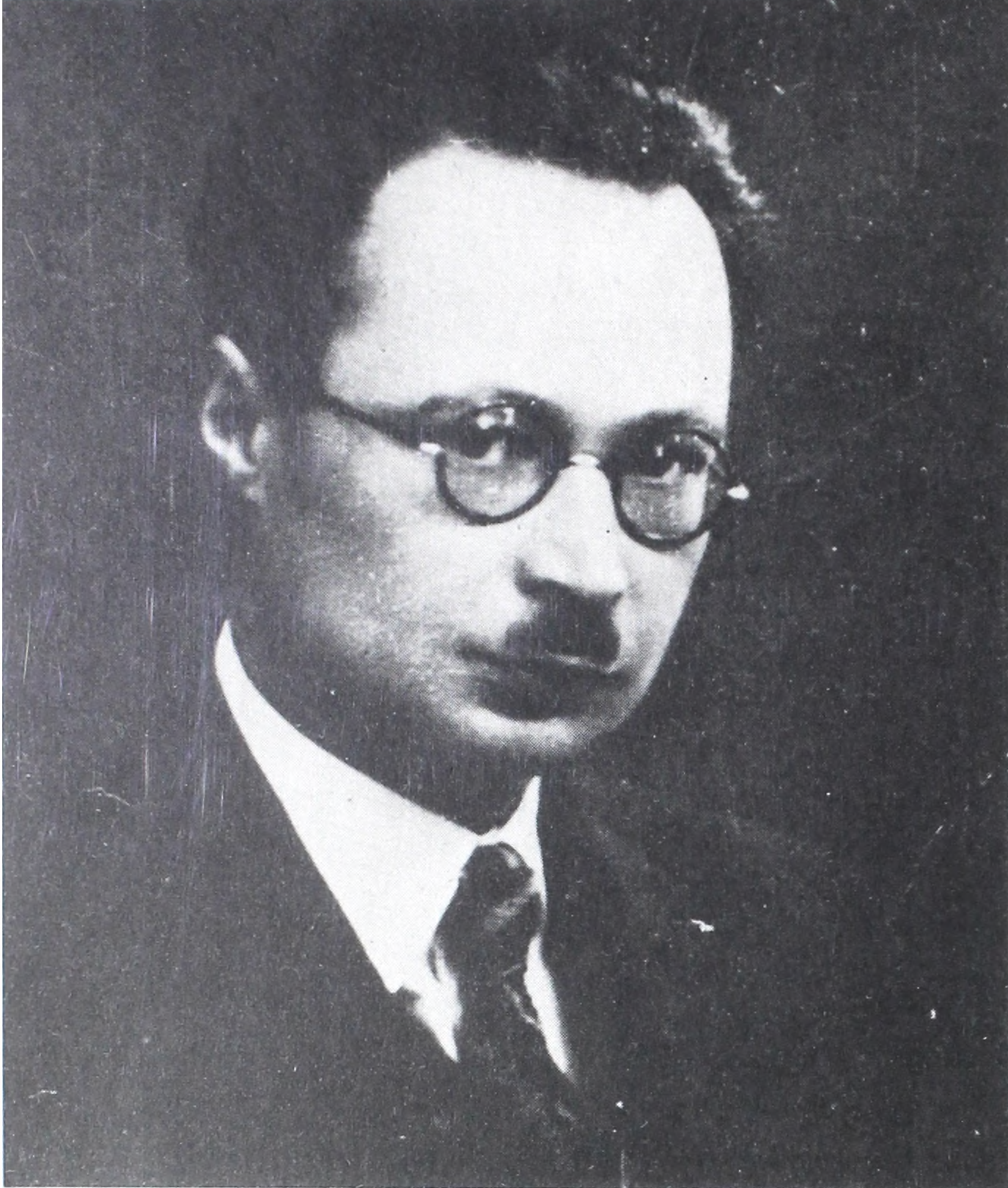

Political Secretary of the Central Committee of the Communist Party of Yugoslavia
- In office 1 December 1927 – 13 April 1928
- Preceded by: Sima Marković
- Succeeded by: Jovan Mališić

Personal details
- Born: 25 March 1896
- Died: 26 April 1938 (aged 42)
- Party: Communist Party of Yugoslavia

Đuro Cvijić (pseudonym: Krešić; born on 25 March 1896 in Zagreb — died on 26 April 1938 in Moscow) was a Yugoslav communist from Croatia. He joined the League of Communists of Yugoslavia (LCY) in 1919.

He was elected the political secretary of the Central Committee of the Communist Party of Yugoslavia (CPY) at the 4th Session of the Central Committee of the 3rd CPY Congress, which was in session from 27 November – 1 December 1927. From the party's founding on 23 April 1919 until 1928, Cvijić served as secretary of the Provincial Executive Committee of the CPY in Croatia and Slavonia. He also served as an ordinary member of the CPY Central Committee and the CPY Politburo.

He was killed on charges of anti-revolutionary activity during the Great Purge but was rehabilitated by a decision of the Military Collegium of the Supreme Court of the USSR in 1963.

== Bibliography ==
- Drachkovitch, Milorad (1973). Biographical Dictionary of the Comintern. Hoover Institution Press. ISBN 9780817984038.
- Tito, Josip Broz (1980). Cengle, Franc; Strugar, Novak; Borozan, Đorđe (eds.). The Party of the Revolution: Fifth Conference of the Communist Party of Yugoslavia, 1940. Belgrade, SFR Yugoslavia: Socialist Thought and Practice.
- Tito, Josip Broz (1981). Damjanović, Pero (ed.). Sabrana Djela: Maj 1926 – Avgust 1928 [Collected Works: May 1926 – August 1928]. Belgrade, SFR Yugoslavia: Beogradski izdavačko-grafički zavod.
