= Kosta Novaković =

Serbian and Yugoslav socialist politician

Kosta Novaković Коста Новаковић
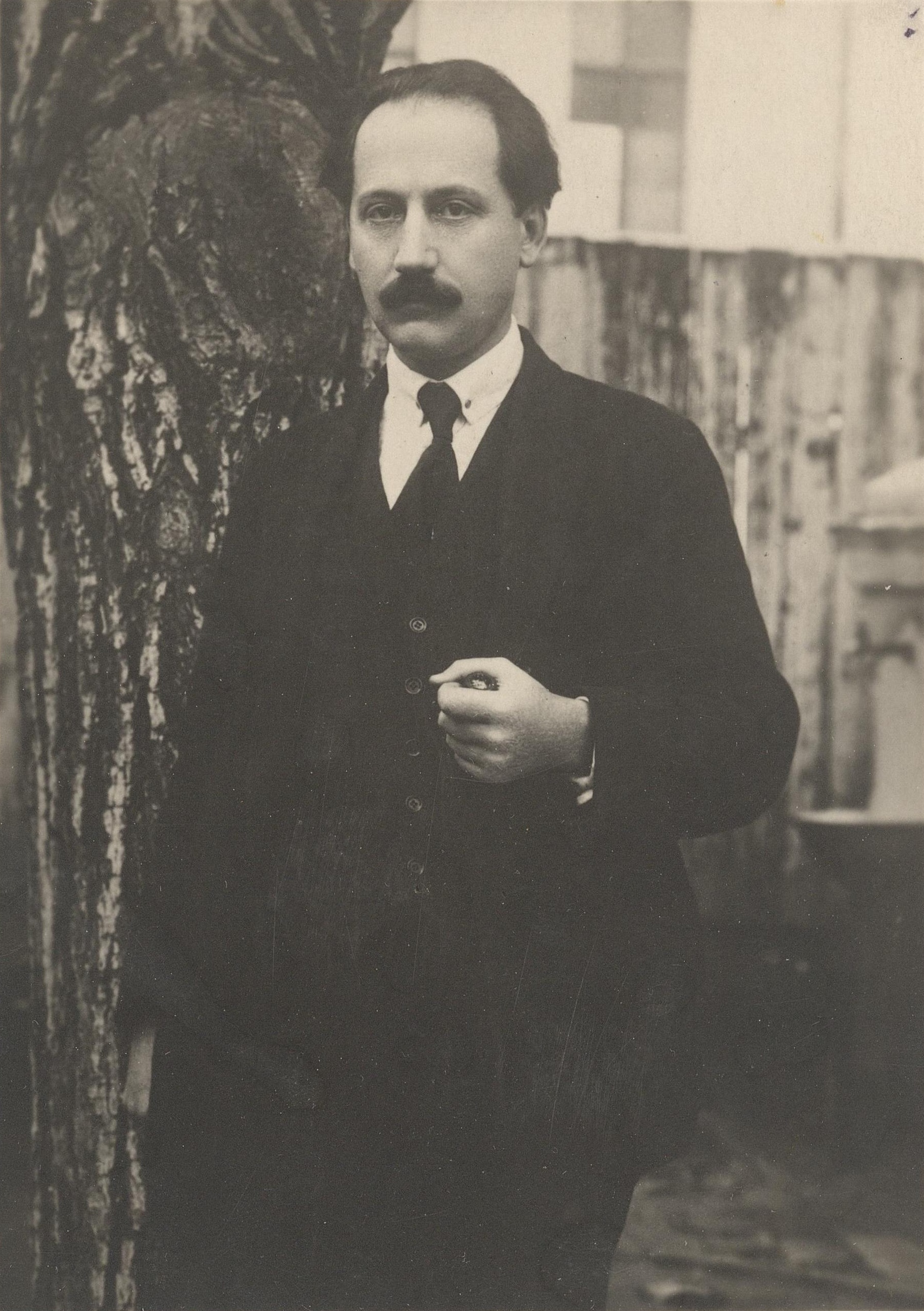
- Novaković in the 1920s
- Born: 3 June 1886
- Died: 1939 (aged 52–53); Moscow, USSR
- Political party: Serbian Social Democratic Party

Kosta Novaković (Serbian Cyrillic: Коста Новаковић; 3 June 1886 in Čačak – 1939 in Moscow, USSR) was a Serbian and Yugoslav socialist politician, journalist and professor and one of the most prominent in the Serbian left-wing politics of the 20th century.

He was a prominent member of the Serbian Social Democratic Party in the Kingdom of Serbia and one of the founders and leaders of the Communist Party of Yugoslavia.

He was the editor of the leftist newspapers "Radnicke novine", "Radnik" and "Borba". As a Serbian soldier, he was in Albania during the Balkan Wars, informing the public about the atrocities committed there.

His most significant literary work is "Macedonia to Macedonians, Land to the Peasants", for which he was sentenced to prison by the authorities of Kingdom of Yugoslavia. After the ban of the Communist Party of Yugoslavia legal activity he emigrated from the Kingdom of Yugoslavia to the Soviet Union, where he continued his political actions.

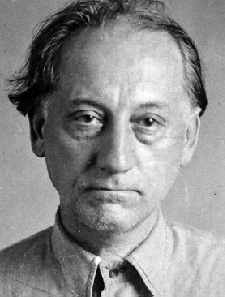
Novaković after arrest by NKVD, 1938

During the Stalinist purges in 1939, he was shot dead along with many other leading Yugoslav communists.
