= Socialist Thought and Practice =

Socialist Thought and Practice was a Marxist monthly theoretical magazine published in English by the League of Communists of Yugoslavia from 1961 through 1989. The magazine was regarded as an important vehicle for the spread of the ideas of Third Camp Socialism and Yugoslav Workers' self-management. Editor of the publication for much of its existence was Edvard Kardelj.
