= Croatian Special Operations Forces Command =

- Croatian: Zapovjedništvo specijalnih snaga OSRH
- Active: 2015–present
- Country: Croatia
- Allegiance: Armed Forces of Croatia
- Type: Unified special operations combatant command
- Size: 300+ (2026)
- Garrison/HQ: Stožerni Brigadir Ante Šaškor barracks, Delnice; Josip Jović barracks, Udbina; Admiral Flote Sveto Letica - Barba barracks Lora
- Nickname: Green Berets
- Mottos: Viribus unitis (lat. "With united forces")
- Colors: Green
- Anniversaries: May 18
- Engagements: War in Afghanistan (2003–2020); EUFOR Tchad/RCA (2008–2009); NATO Response Force (2017–present); EU NAVFOR Somalia (2021–present); Takuba Task Force (2020–2022)
- Decorations: Order of Ban Jelačić

Commanders
- Current commander: Brigadier Ivan Miloš (2021–present)
- Notable commanders: Brigadier general Perica Turalija (2015–2021)

The Croatian Special Operations Forces Command (Croatian: Zapovjedništvo specijalnih snaga (ZSS)) is the special forces command unit of the Armed Forces of Croatia. It reports to the General Staff of the Croatian Armed Forces, alongside the Croatian Army, Croatian Air Force, and Croatian Navy. Its mission is to conduct special operations on behalf of the Croatian government and the Ministry of Defence. They are colloquially known as the "Green Berets" due to their distinctive headgear. It is the youngest military unit co-equal to service branches with over 300 personnel within the command. It maintains close cooperation with the Croatian Military Security and Intelligence Agency (VSOA).

This unit oversees specialised airborne operations, counter-insurgency, counter-terrorism, foreign internal defense, covert ops, direct action, hostage rescue, high-value targets/manhunts, intelligence operations, mobility operations, and unconventional warfare. The Croatian Special Forces were created in 2015 from the Special Operations Battalion (BSD) which existed until the year prior. Its emergence sought to create interoperable and quickly deployable special operations forces that would be able to respond to current and future security challenges adequately. This military unit has supported coalition operations alongside regional allies and alliances such as NATO.

== History ==
The Zrinski Battalion (Croatian: Bojna Zrinski) was the first special forces unit of the Croatian National Guard (Croatian: Zbor narodne garde – ZNG) and later of the Croatian Army (Croatian: Hrvatska vojska - HV) established in Kumrovec on May 18, 1991, during the Croatian War of Independence.

On May 18, 1991, the Zrinski Battalion was established as a special forces unit of the ZNG. The core of the unit consisted of 27 volunteers drawn from the 300-strong Kumrovec Special Police Unit (Kumrovec SPU) with the addition of two members from the Lučko Anti-Terrorist Unit. Initially, it relied on former French Foreign Legion troops of Croatian origin. The most senior among the former legionnaires was Ante Roso, previously a Sous-Officier (non-commissioned officer – NCO) in the 4th Foreign Regiment. In consequence, Roso was tasked with setting up the unit as its initial commander. Major Miljenko Filipović, likewise a former French Foreign Legion NCO, was assigned as the battalions deputy commander. The unit was based in the village of Kumrovec in the region of Hrvatsko Zagorje, on the grounds of the former "Josip Broz Tito" political school, named after this communist dictator and lifetime "president" of communist SFRJ. The site, adjacent to the border of Slovenia, was selected to be inaccessible to Yugoslav Air Force raids without violation of Slovene or possibly Austrian airspace. In June 1991, the Kumrovec SPU was transferred to Sljeme Peak north of Zagreb leaving Kumrovec base to the Zrinski Battalion, as well as the second special forces unit, the Frankopan Battalion. Over the course of the war following additional recruitment and training of volunteers the unit reached the size of a company and at most had around 150 members. The unit suffered 26 KIA before being amalgamated with other special forces units of the Croatian Army to the 1. HGZ (Croatian: 1. hrvatski gardijski zdrug) in April 1994.

The Zrinski Battalion was deployed for the first time on June 15, 1991. It was stationed in Vukovar, tasked with the preparation of city defences and organization and training of volunteer troops in Vukovar in June, 1991. In August Filipović took over command of the battalion from Roso. The same month, the Zrinski Battalion went to Banovina, where it pushed the Croatian Serb forces out of the town of Hrvatska Kostajnica. In September, the battalion was deployed to Gospić, where it took part in the battle of Gospić against the JNA. Troops assigned to the battalion captured Kaniža barracks in Gospić. During combat in Gospić, 30 troops of the Zrinski Battalion, assisted by Lučko Anti-Terrorist Unit, captured JNA Major General Trajče Krstevski along with three BOV Armoured Personnel Carriers (APCs) and 32 soldiers. The unit was deployed to Metković on October 28, tasked with recapturing Slano from the JNA. After the deployment to Gospić, a part of the unit personnel left to Bosnia and Herzegovina anticipating further conflict there, while the remainder of the unit returned to Kumrovec. The ZNG was renamed the Croatian Army (Croatian: Hrvatska vojska – HV) on November 3, 1991. In late 1991, some of the personnel of the Zrinski Battalion were transferred to set up another special forces unit of the HV - the Matija Vlačić Battalion based in Opatija.

In 1992, elements of the Zrinski Battalion took part in the Battle of Kupres, before setting up a training camp in the town of Tomislavgrad. There the battalion personnel assisted in setting up and training the Croatian Defence Council (Croatian: Hrvatsko vijeće obrane - HVO). Later that year, elements of the battalion took part in Operation Tiger - aimed at lifting of the Siege of Dubrovnik.

In 1993, elements of the Zrinski Battalion took part in Operation Maslenica, fighting in the area of Škabrnja. The Central Intelligence Agency assessed the Zrinski Battalion as one of the best units of the HV.

On 25 February 1994, the Zrinski Battalion was amalgamated with parts of other special forces units of the HV: Frankopan Battalion, Ban Jelačić Battalion, Matija Vlačić Battalion, Ferdo Sučić Battalion, Alpha Battalion and parts of 8th Light Assault Brigade of the Croatian Military Police forming the 1st Croatian Guards Brigade (Croatian: 1. hrvatski gardijski zdrug), a component of the 1st Croatian Guards Corps (Croatian: 1. hrvatski gardijski zbor), directly subordinated to the Ministry of Defence rather than the General Staff of the Armed Forces of the Republic of Croatia.

The 1.HGZ took part in several important battles of the Croatian War of Independence and the Bosnian War. In late November and December 1994, it participated in Operation Winter '94, the joint offensive of the HV and the Croatian Defence Council (Croatian: Hrvatsko vijeće obrane - HVO) which pushed the Army of Republika Srpska (Croatian: Vojska Republike Srpske – VRS) from the western parts of the Livanjsko polje in Bosnia and Herzegovina. Elements of the HGZ also saw action along the Novska-Okučani axis of advance in the HV's Operation Flash offensive that took place in western Slavonia in early May 1995. By this time, the HGZ also commanded its own artillery and Mil Mi-24 helicopter gunships, in addition to Mil Mi-8 transport helicopters. The HGZ redeployed west of Livno once again in early June to take part in Operation Leap 2, extending the salient that had been created in late 1994 towards Bosansko Grahovo and Glamoč. The unit participated in the capture of those towns in late July, 1995 during Operation Summer '95.

In preparation for Operation Storm, the HV 4th Guards and 7th Guards Brigades were pulled back from positions facing the VRS that had been established during Operation Summer '95 and were repositioned south towards the Army of the Republic of Serb Krajina (ARSK). The ARSK was protecting the northern approaches to Knin − the capital of the unrecognized Republic of Serbian Krajina − which Croatia claimed as part of its own territory. As the two brigades turned over the positions north and west of Bosansko Grahovo to the HV 81st Guards Battalion, the 1. HGZ was deployed to the rear of the battalion, tasked with intervening in case of any VRS attack towards Bosansko Grahovo. On the second day of the operation, August 6, 1995 after Knin was captured by the HV, the HGZ was airlifted from the Livanjsko field to the village of Rovanjska north of Zadar. They then linked up with the 2nd Battalion Thermites of the 9th Guards Brigade and advanced east to capture the villages of Muškovac and Kaštel Žegarski. On August 8, the 1. HGZ participated in an operation against the last significant Army of the Republic of Serb Krajina pocket in the area of Donji Lapac and Srb, alongside the three guards brigades and special police forces.

In September 1995, the HGZ took part in Operation Mistral 2, which extended HV and Croatian Defence Council control in western Bosnia and Herzegovina and captured the towns of Jajce, Šipovo and Drvar, moving the confrontation line north towards the Bosnian Serb capital of Banja Luka. In October, the 1. HGZ also participated in Operation Southern Move, which captured the town of Mrkonjić Grad, and reached the southern slopes of Mount Manjača, 25 kilometres (16 miles) south of Banja Luka. During the Croatian War of Independence, 75 members of Zrinski Battalion, 1. HGZ and other special forces units of the Croatian Army were killed in action, 286 were wounded and 2 are MIA.

The 1. HGZ was disbanded in 2000 and its constituents were reorganized. A part of the HGZ was amalgamated with the Special Combat Skills Centre in Šepurine to form the Special Operations Battalion (Croatian: Bojna za specijalna djelovanja - BSD). The remainder of the unit was amalgamated with the Reconnaissance-Sabotage Company based in Pula, the 350th Sabotage Detachment, the 280th Unmanned Aerial Vehicle Platoon, and the 275th Electronic Warfare Company to form the 350th Military Intelligence Battalion. The elements of the 1st Croatian Guards Corps which were tasked with security of the President of Croatia and ceremonial duties were reorganized and the Honor Guard Battalion was established.

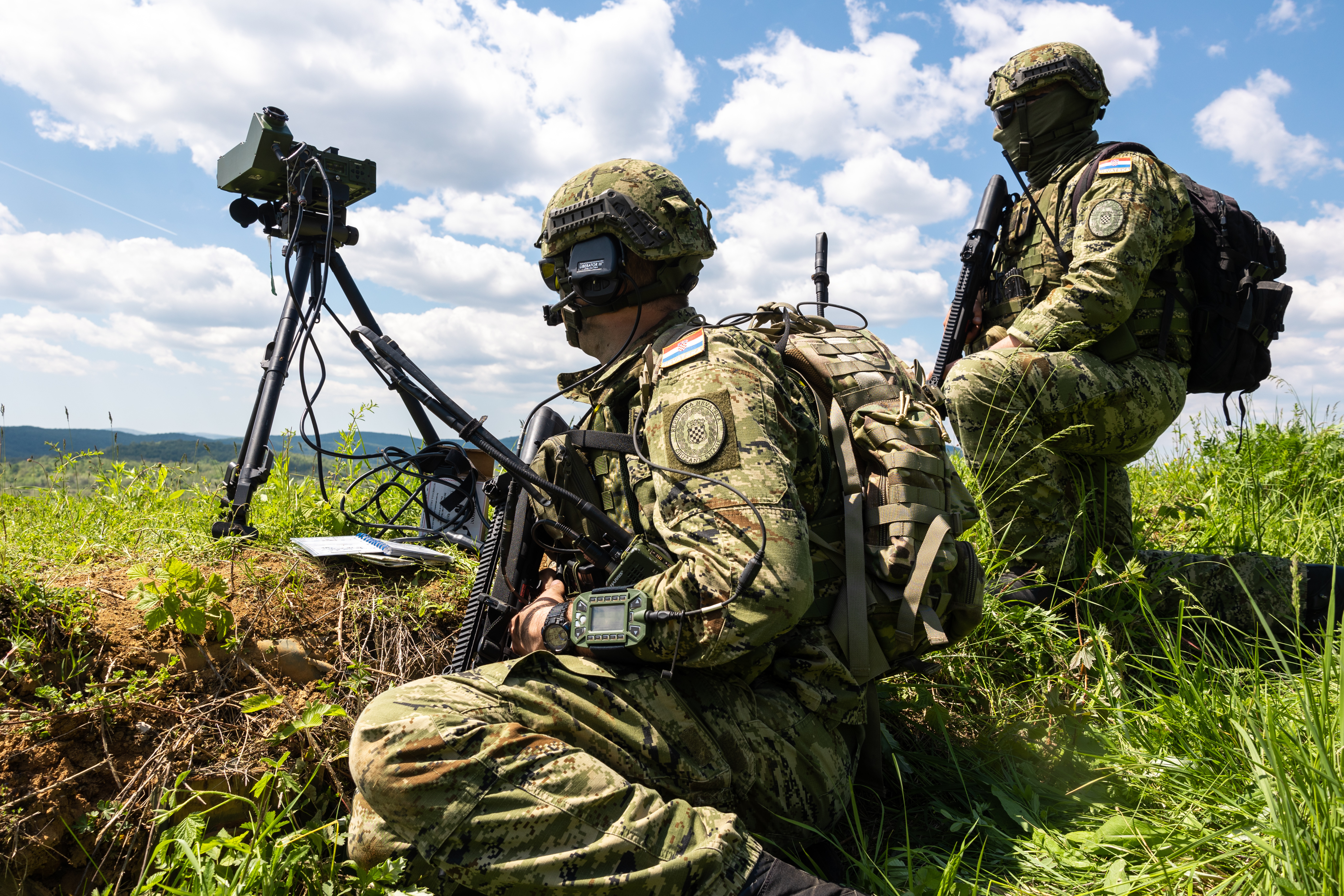
Croatian Special Forces in 2022

The Special Operations Battalion consisted of one command section and five companies, each specialized for a different variety of missions:

- Command Section - responsible for command, control and communications, intelligence, logistics, medical personnel, supplies, and transport
- 1st Special Operations Company - specialized for air assault and airborne (including pathfinder) operations in the event of an emergency requiring military force as a rapid reaction force (RRF)
- 2nd Special Operations Company - specialized for clandestine operations, combat search and rescue, counterinsurgency, direct action, irregular warfare, jungle warfare, long-range penetration, mountain rescue, mountain warfare, and special reconnaissance.
- 3rd Special Operations Company - specialized for amphibious reconnaissance, amphibious warfare, clandestine operations, direct action, long-range penetration, maritime counterterrorism, maritime search and rescue, naval boarding, naval special warfare, special reconnaissance, underwater demolition, and VIPs protection.
- 4th Special Operations Company - specialized for clandestine operations, direct action, hostage rescue, irregular warfare, long-range penetration, special reconnaissance, urban counterterrorism and urban warfare, urban rescue, and VIPs protection.
- Fire Support Company - specialized for counter-sniper/sniper and mortar training and fire support with snipers to other four BSD companies.

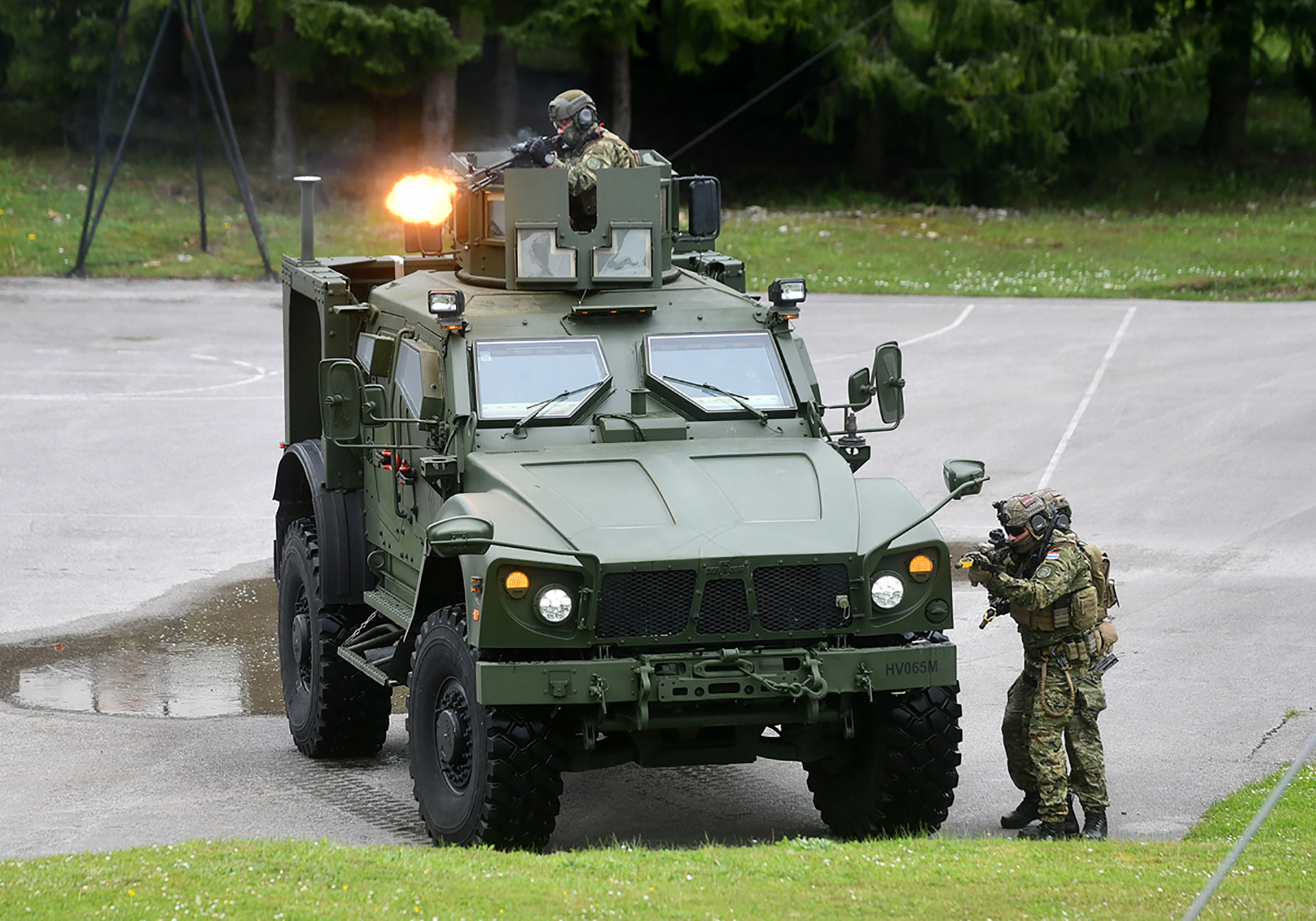
A Special Forces operation carried out in 2019

The Special Operations Battalion reorganization and transformation into the Croatian Special Operations Forces Command was completed in February 2015.

A subsequent reorganization of the CROSOFCOM followed in mid 2019 which saw an additional creation of three new Special Forces Groups, the 3rd, 4th and 5th Special Forces Groups respectively. Alongside the CROSOFCOM reorganization, the 194th Multipurpose Helicopter Squadron of the 91st Wing of the Croatian Air Force, stood up the 3rd Special Operations Aviation Platoon which will support the CROSOFCOM with its Mil Mi-171Sh helicopters until the arrival of new UH-60M Blackhawk helicopters in 2022.

== Structure and Organization ==
=== Current organization ===
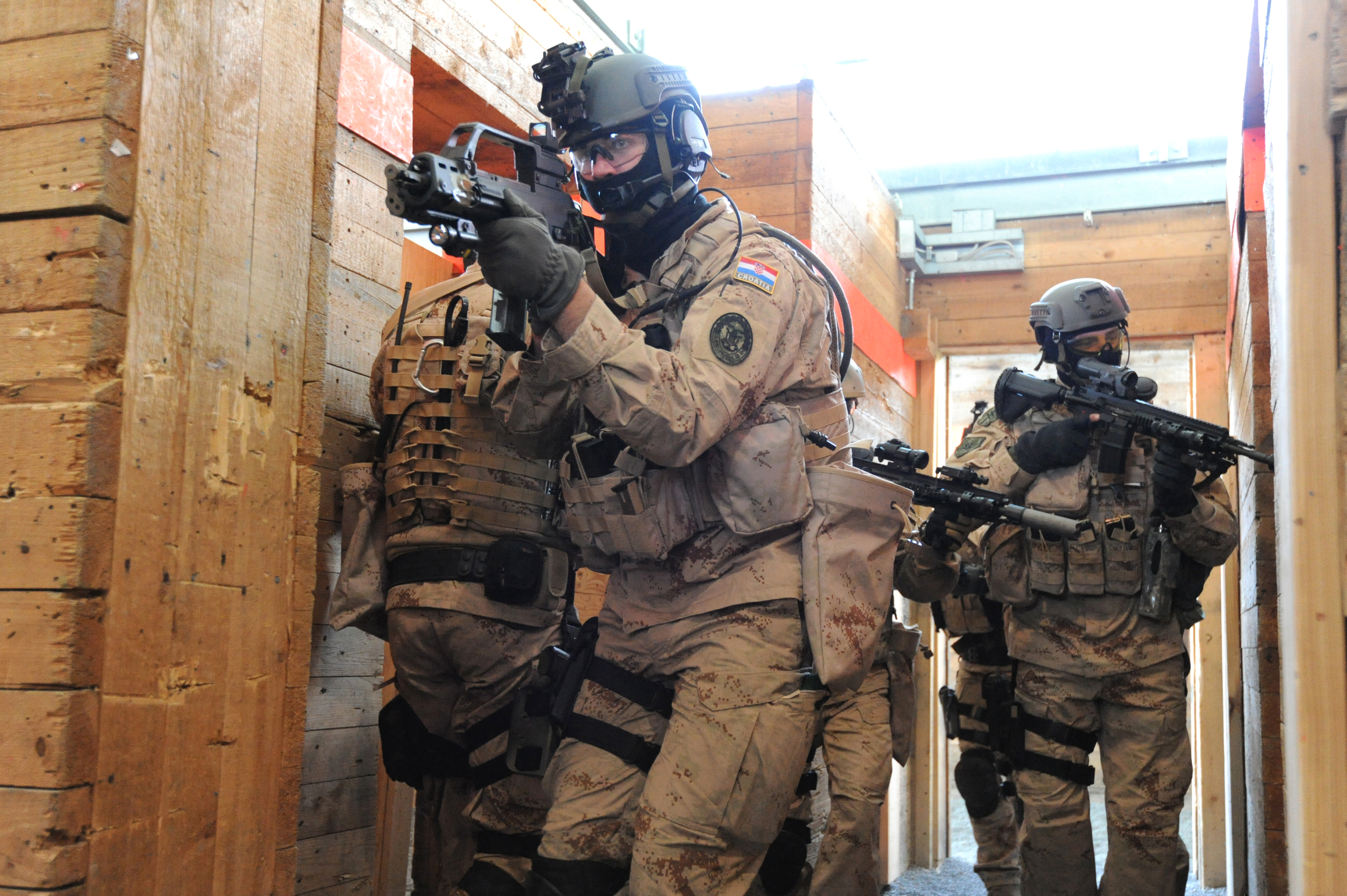
- Croatian Special Forces during a training raid in Germany, 2022
  Command / Headquarters - responsible for command, control, communications, intelligence, logistics, medical support, supply, and transportation.
- Command / Headquarters Support Unit - provides support to the command element of CROSOFCOM.
- 1st Special Forces Group - specializes in air assault and airborne operations as a Rapid Reaction Force (RRF) during emergencies requiring military intervention. Capabilities include clandestine operations, cold-weather warfare, combat search and rescue (CSAR), counterinsurgency, direct action, domestic counterterrorism, forward air control (FAC), irregular warfare, jungle warfare, long-range penetration, maneuver warfare, mountain warfare, special reconnaissance, and urban warfare. Known to have at least 3 SOTUs.
  - SOTU 11 - Special Operations Task Unit 11 - motto "Nulli secundus"
  - SOTU 12 - Special Operations Task Unit 12 - motto "Viribus unitis"
  - SOTU 13 - Special Operations Task Unit 13 - motto "Acta non verba"
- 2nd Special Forces Group - comparable to United States Navy SEALs, specializing in air-sea rescue, amphibious reconnaissance in preparation for amphibious warfare operations, clandestine operations, direct action, maritime counterterrorism, hostage rescue, long-range penetration, naval boarding, naval special warfare, special reconnaissance, underwater demolition, and VIP protection. Known to have at least 3 SOMTUs.
  - SOMTU 21 - Special Operations Maritime Task Unit 21
  - SOMTU 22 - Special Operations Maritime Task Unit 22
  - SOMTU 23 - Special Operations Maritime Task Unit 23
- 3rd Special Forces Group - provides training and support to CROSOFCOM.
  - Support company - provides all forms of support necessary for the day-to-day functioning of CROSOFCOM. This unit also includes a K9 squad.
  - Training company - responsible for organizing selection and training for CROSOFCOM personnel.
- 4th Special Forces Group - specializes in combat search and rescue (CSAR) operations.
- 5th Special Forces Group - specializes in psychological operations (PSYOPs).

The Special Forces Command (SFC) organizes, equips, and trains the Special Forces Groups (SFG) to independently conduct special operations. In addition to developing their own operational capabilities, the SFC ensures that these groups can integrate and operate effectively alongside other specialized forces of the Croatian Armed Forces (CAF).

The Special Operations Forces Command achieves its mission through four complementary components: command, operational, support, and training elements.

The command element prepares and directs individuals, units, and commands for special operations, including covert or highly sensitive missions. It supports the CAF chain of command in planning and executing these operations, supervises the preparation and training of forces, strengthens command capability at both the strategic and operational levels, and performs additional tasks essential to the effective functioning of the CAF.

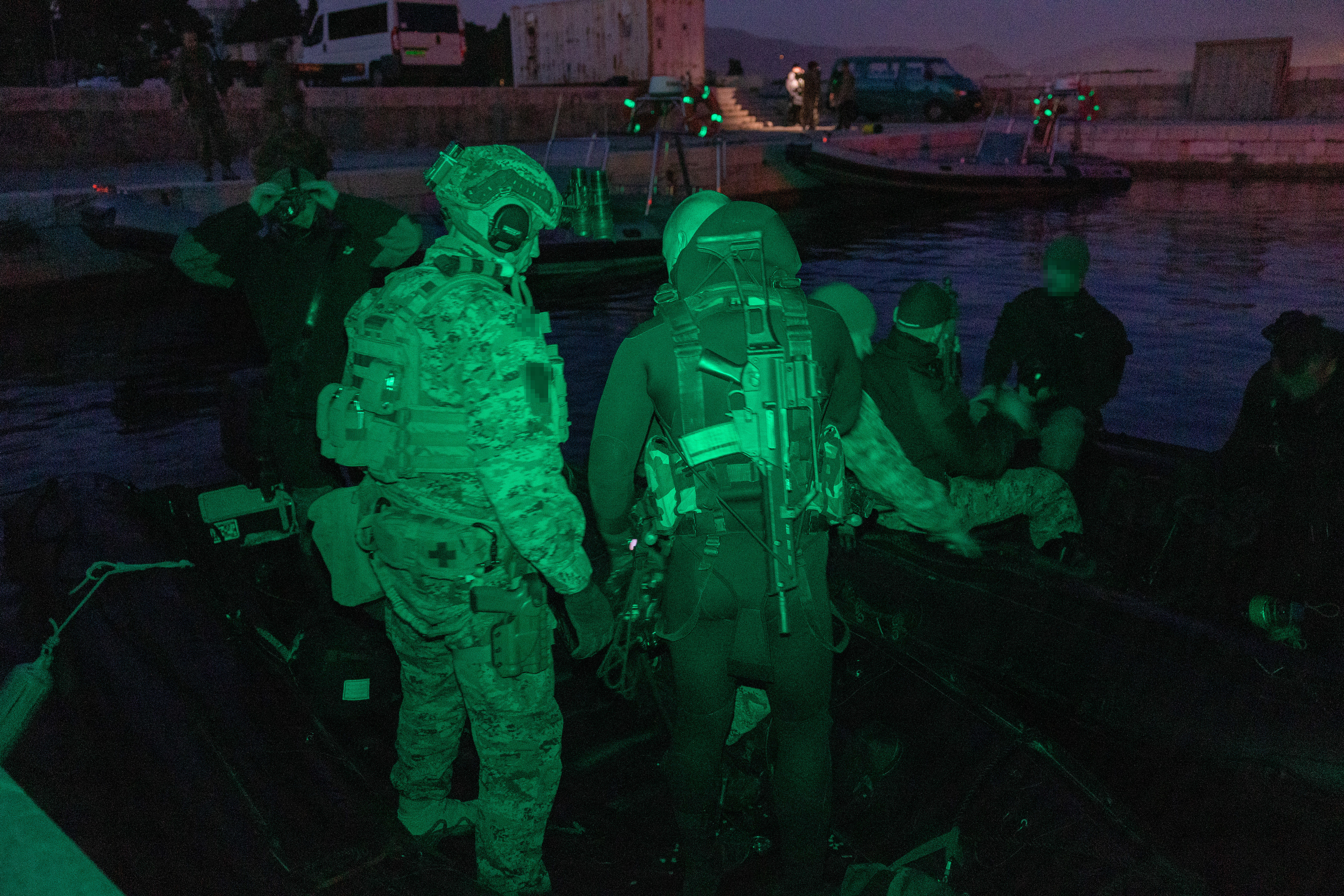
A Special Forces night operation during, 2022

The operational element consists of the Special Forces Groups, including one Ground Special Operations Task Group (SO(L)TG) and one Maritime Special Operations Task Group (SO(M)TG), tasked with the planning and execution of special operations, either independently or with the support of other components of CROSOFCOM and the Croatian Armed Forces.

Special Forces Groups comprise a Command with S-1 through S-6 staff functions, Special Operations Task Units (SOTUs), and a Combat Support Platoon with combat support elements. Special Operations Forces teams are composed of 12 personnel who, according to mission requirements, develop the capability for independent operations and may reorganize into formations of up to 24 personnel. The operational element also includes forces organized in a Commando Company, capable of conducting operations independently or as part of larger operational forces.

The support element provides all forms of administrative and logistical support necessary for the daily functioning, sustainment, and operational readiness of CROSOFCOM. When required, it augments Special Forces Groups with specialized support elements, such as EOD specialists, K9 handlers, and others.

The training company is responsible for Special Operations Forces training, including selection, qualification courses, and advanced skills development for Special Operations Forces personnel.

The CROSOFCOM is supported in its operations by helicopters provided by the 3rd Special Aviation Platoon of the 194th Multi-Role Helicopter Squadron of the Croatian Air Force, which delivers dedicated aviation support for special operations.

== Anniversary day ==
The anniversary day of the Croatian Special Operations Forces Command is honored to the organization and the formation of the first special forces unit of the Croatian Armed Forces - the Zrinski Battalion, established on May 18, 1991.

== International cooperation ==
- United States Special Operations Command
- Special Operations Command Europe
- 10th Special Forces Group
- 19th Special Forces Group
- Naval Special Warfare Unit 2
- German Special Forces
- Polish Special Forces
- UK Special Forces
- CEDC Special Forces
