= Ante Roso =

Herzegovinian-Croat army general

Army General Ante Zorislav Roso
- Ante Zorislav Roso
- Born: April 25, 1952; Osijek, SR Croatia, SFR Yugoslavia
- Died: September 16, 2025 (aged 73); Port La Nouvelle, France
- Military career
- Rank: Staff Sergeant (French Foreign Legion); Army General (Croatian Defence Council)
- Commands: Zrinski Battalion
- Conflicts: Operation Maslenica; Operation Neretva '93; Operation Tvigi 94

Ante Zorislav Roso (25 April 1952 – 16 September 2025) was a Bosnian Croat army general. He was a sergeant in the French Foreign Legion, and upon his return to Croatia on the eve of the Croatian War of Independence, he organized the first special units of the Croatian Army, was the Chief of the Croatian Defence Council's Main Staff and carried out Operation Maslenica.

== Biography ==
=== Early life and the Foreign Legion ===
Roso was born in Osijek on 25 April 1952. He is originally from Ljubuški in Herzegovina. During the SFR Yugoslavia, he was a political emigrant. He was a member of the French Foreign Legion in which he rose to the rank of sergeant; there he met Ante Gotovina.

=== Croatian War of Independence ===
He returned to Croatia before the Homeland War. He organized and successfully trained, in cooperation with other former members of the French Foreign Legion, elite units of the Croatian Army, which successfully carried out the most demanding tasks during the Homeland War. He was the first commander of the Zrinski Battalion, the first special unit of the Croatian Army. During the first meeting, he addressed the selected candidates with the words: "Those who are not ready to die for Croatia, I beg you to leave the hall". The Zrinski Battalion was formed with the intention of operating independently throughout the entire territory of Croatia and carrying out sabotage operations deep inside enemy territory in the form of smaller combat groups. Ante Roso and the battalion's deputy commander Miljenko Filipović conducted the training using the methods and experience they had gained in the Foreign Legion.

In August 1991, Ante Roso transferred to the Main Staff of the Croatian Army. He fought on the front lines of the battlefield, together with the soldiers. He was one of the commanders in Operation Maslenica. During the action, Croatian soldiers and police liberated the Zadar hinterland, Masleničko ždrilo, and Zemunik Airport, while the Peruća Dam was liberated later.

He founded the Knez Branimir Battalion with four companies, which was the first professional Croatian unit in the Croatian Community of Herceg-Bosna. It later grew into the 1st Guards Brigade Ante Bruno Bušić.

Roso left for Bosnia and Herzegovina on 8 November 1993 and took over command of the Croatian Defence Council (HVO) General Staff from General Slobodan Praljak. He was a commander in Operation Neretva '93 and Operation Tvigi 94.

He significantly improved the condition of the HVO forces and contributed to forcing the Bosniak side to sign a ceasefire, which they agreed to. General Roso became part of the Joint Command of the HVO and the Armija BiH. He led the joint command of the HVO and the Army of Bosnia and Herzegovina in Sarajevo together with Fikret Muslimović.

=== Post-war ===
The then President of the Republic of Croatia Franjo Tuđman retired him in 1997.

Roso participated in the establishment of the Croatian Generals' Assembly in November 2005.

He died on 16 September 2025 in Port La Nouvelle.
