= Special Operations Battalion (Croatia) =

Special forces military unit

- Active: September 8, 2000 – December 24, 2014
- Country: Croatia
- Branch: General staff unit
- Type: Special forces
- Size: Battalion (5 companies)
- Garrison/HQ: Drgomalj Delnice
- Nicknames: Green berets, Cobras
- Mottos: Svi su pozvani, rijetki su odabrani (All are invited, few are chosen)
- Colors: green
- Anniversaries: 8 September
- Engagements: War in Afghanistan
- Decorations: Order of Ban Jelačić

Commanders
- Current commander: Lieutenant Colonel Perica Turalija

The Special Operations Battalion (Croatian: Bojna za specijalna djelovanja), or popularly known as BSD, is a former Croatian special forces unit.

BSD operators can be recognized by their green berets with unit badges over the right eye. Their symbol is a snake, so they are sometimes referred as "Cobras" although their insignia shows a Horned viper which is the most dangerous snake to be found in Croatia and in mainland Europe.

== History ==
BSD was founded on 8 September 2000 when the Special Combat Skills Center from Šepurine and the 1st Croatian Guards Brigade (Croatian: 1. hrvatski gardijski zdrug, a component of the 1st Croatian Guards Corps) were amalgamated.

It ceased to exist in 2014, when it was transformed into the Special Operations Command under the "Long-Term Development Plan of the Croatian Armed Forces".

== Main tasks ==
The Battalion was focused on air assault and airborne as well as special operations behind enemy lines with insertion from sea, air, and land. However, unlike most special forces in the world, the Battalion is also trained in non-combat search and rescue of civilians and providing aid as well as dealing with natural disasters. The unit was equipped with the most sophisticated weapons and equipment available, and trained to undertake the full range of special operations missions and even the dangerous mid-air, aircraft-to-aircraft operations. Personnel were trained for:

- Amphibious reconnaissance to prepare for amphibious warfare operations.
- Clandestine and covert operations.
- Close-quarters battle and close-quarters combat.
- Combat special operations on sea, air, and land on all types of terrains and all weather conditions.
- Combat search and rescue and casualty evacuation.
- Deep battlefield infiltration by sea, air, and land.
- Gathering field military intelligence.
- Hostage rescue on all types of terrains and all weather conditions.
- Humanitarian and peacekeeping operations.
- Irregular warfare behind enemy lines.
- Maritime counterterrorism.
- Maritime interdiction operations.
- Psychological warfare operations.
- Providing security in areas at risk of attack or terrorism.
- Rapid reaction to military emergencies as a rapid reaction force.
- Search and rescue for victims of natural disasters.
- Special reconnaissance in difficult to access and dangerous areas.
- Support emergency management.
- Underwater demolition.
- Urban counterterrorism.
- VIPs protection.

The Croatian General Staff exercised direct command over the battalion which thus elevated the unit to strategic level for quicker response time and overall better and faster deployment on both tactical and strategic levels. Also, this meant that members of all three branches of the Croatian armed forces could apply for selection. In 2008, two women successfully completed selection and training, earning their green berets and making the BSD one of the few special forces units in the world that have women among their ranks as combat qualified operators and not just support staff.

== Structure of BSD ==
The BSD was composed of one command section and five companies, each specialized for a different variety of missions:

- Command Section - responsible for command, control and communications, intelligence, logistics, medical personnel, supplies, and transport
- 1st Special Operations Company - specialized for air assault and airborne (including pathfinder) operations in the event of an emergency requiring military force as a rapid reaction force (RRF)
- 2nd Special Operations Company - specialized for clandestine operations, combat search and rescue, counterinsurgency, direct action, irregular warfare, jungle warfare, long-range penetration, mountain rescue, mountain warfare, and special reconnaissance.
- 3rd Special Operations Company - specialized for amphibious reconnaissance, amphibious warfare, clandestine operations, direct action, long-range penetration, maritime counterterrorism, maritime search and rescue, naval boarding, naval special warfare, special reconnaissance, underwater demolition, and VIPs protection.
- 4th Special Operations Company - specialized for clandestine operations, direct action, hostage rescue, irregular warfare, long-range penetration, special reconnaissance, urban counterterrorism and urban warfare, urban rescue, and VIPs protection.
- Fire Support Company - specialized for counter-sniper/sniper and mortar training and fire support with snipers to other four BSD companies.

== Equipment ==
=== Weapons ===
- Handguns

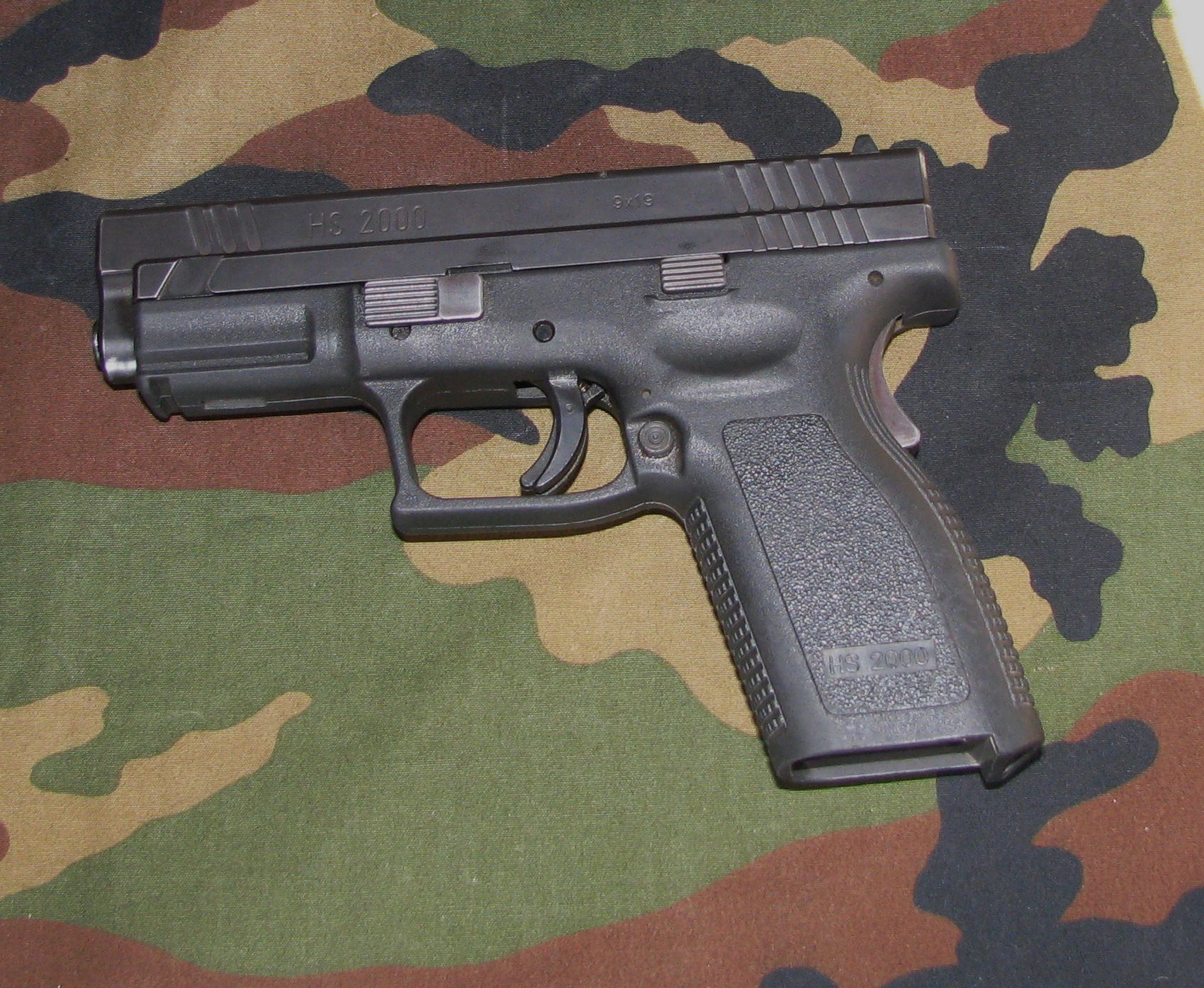
Model	Image	Caliber	Origin	Variants
HS2000		9×19mm	Croatia	XD9 and XD45

- Submachine guns

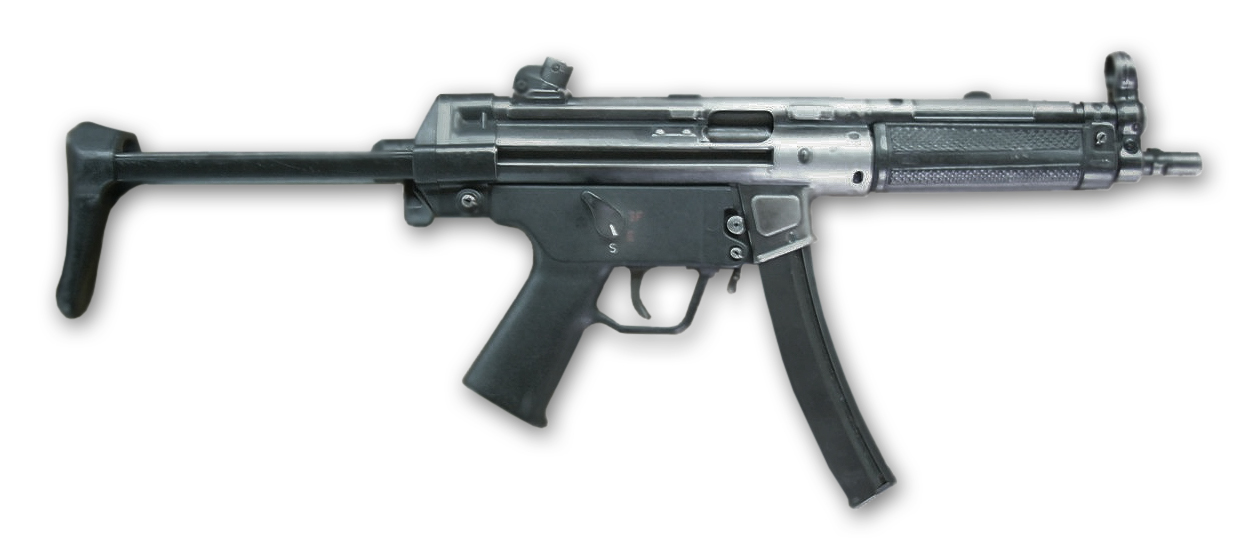
Model	Image	Caliber	Origin	Variants
H&K MP5		9×19mm	Germany	A3 and SD3
H&K MP7		4,6×30mm	Germany	unknown

- Assault rifles

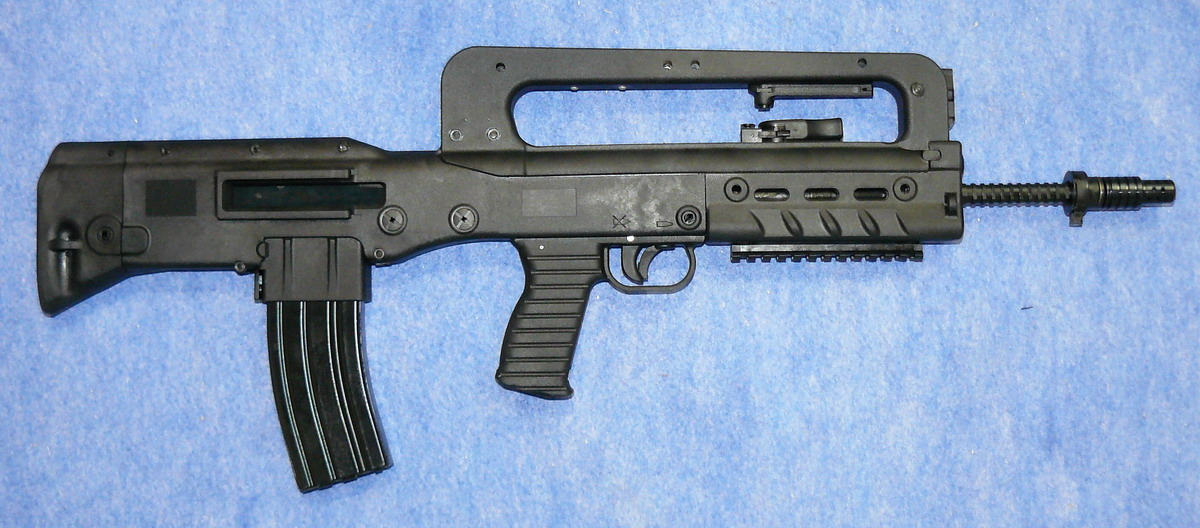
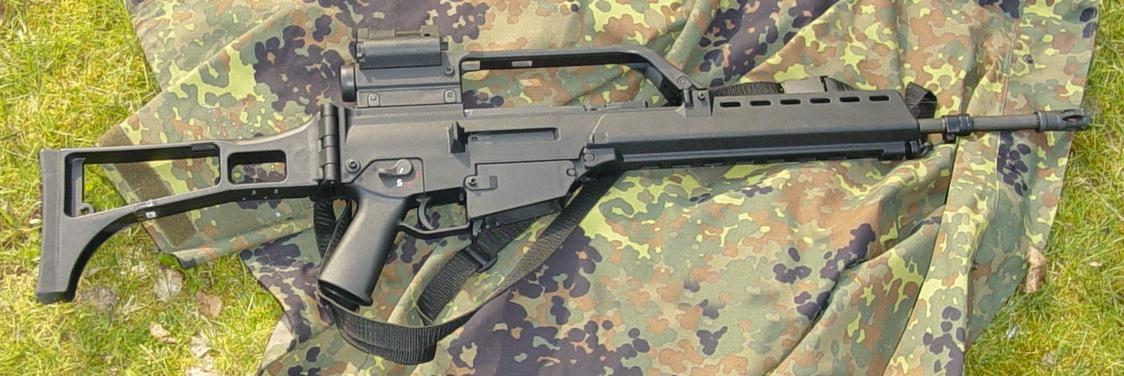
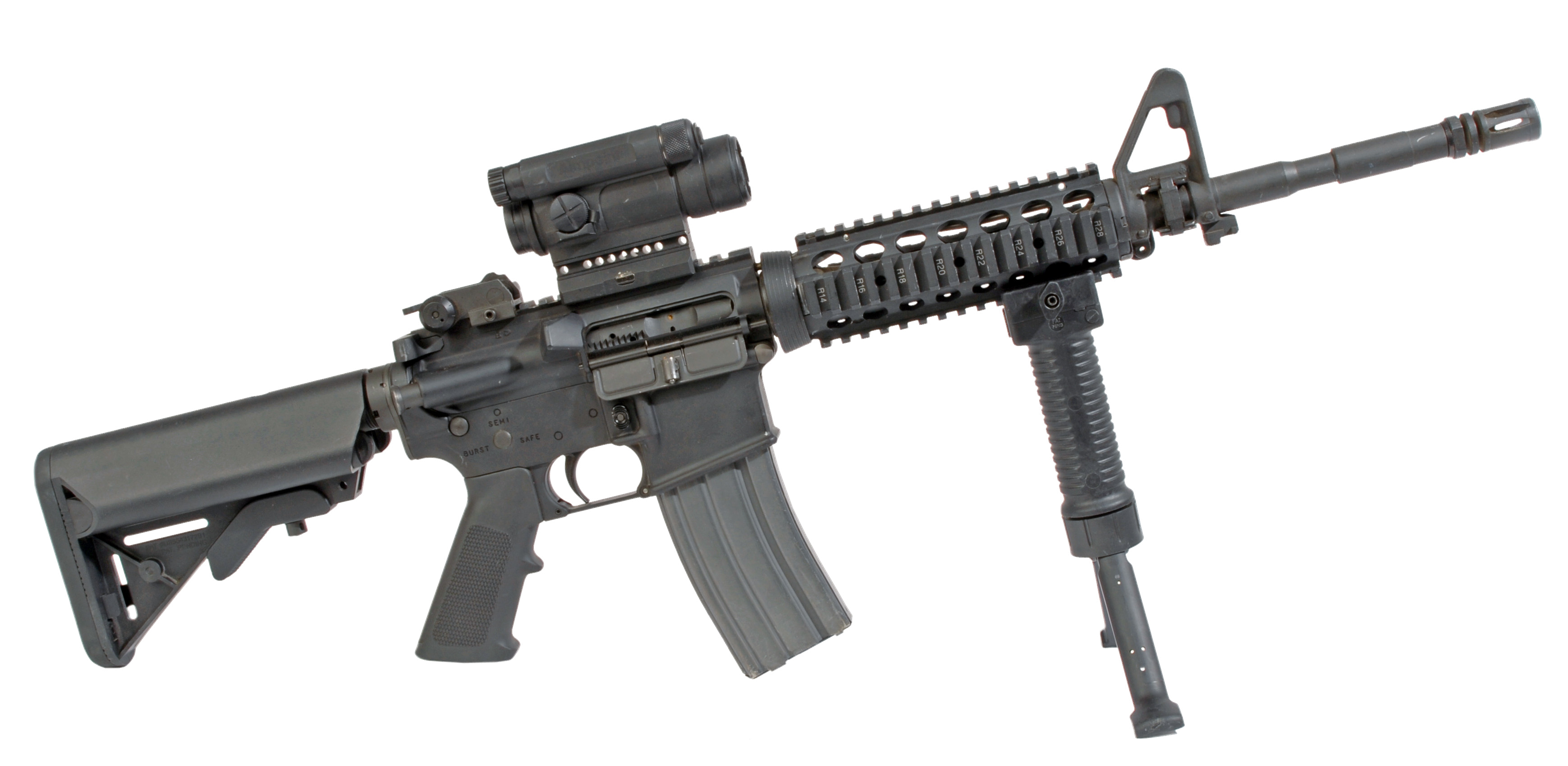
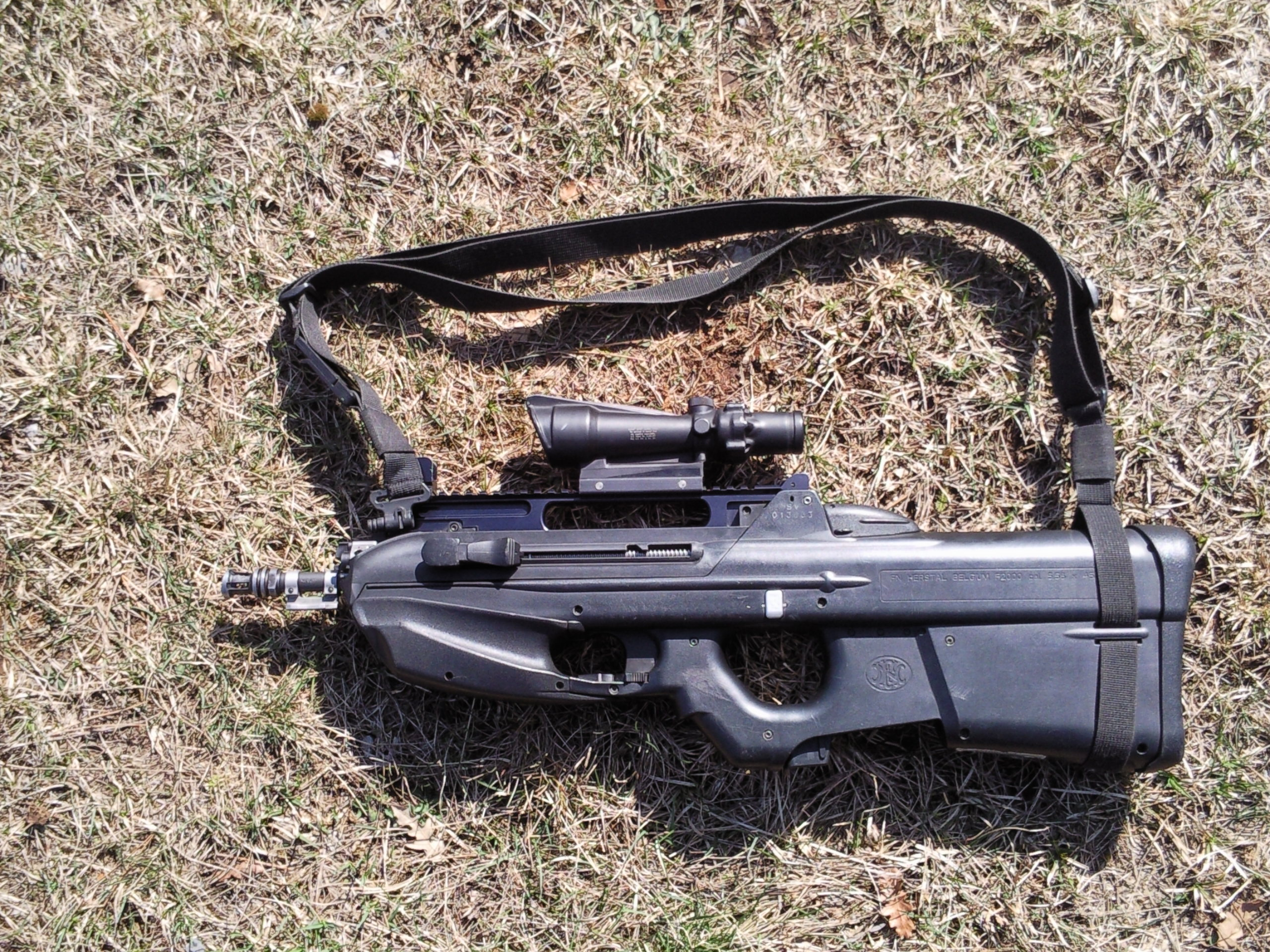
Model	Image	Caliber	Origin	Variants
VHS assault rifle		5.56×45mm	Croatia	VHS-D, VH-K, and VHS 2 VHS-D assault rifle REMOV
Heckler & Koch G36		5.56×45mm	Germany	KV and C
M4 carbine		5.56×45mm	United States	A1
FN F2000		5.56×45mm	Belgium	F2000

- Machine guns

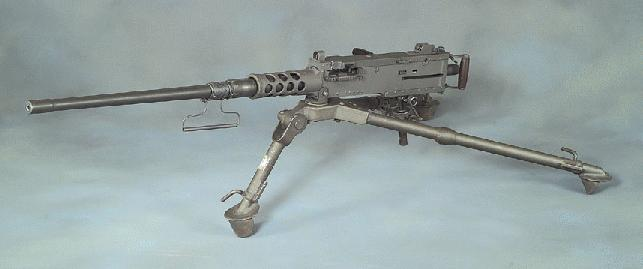
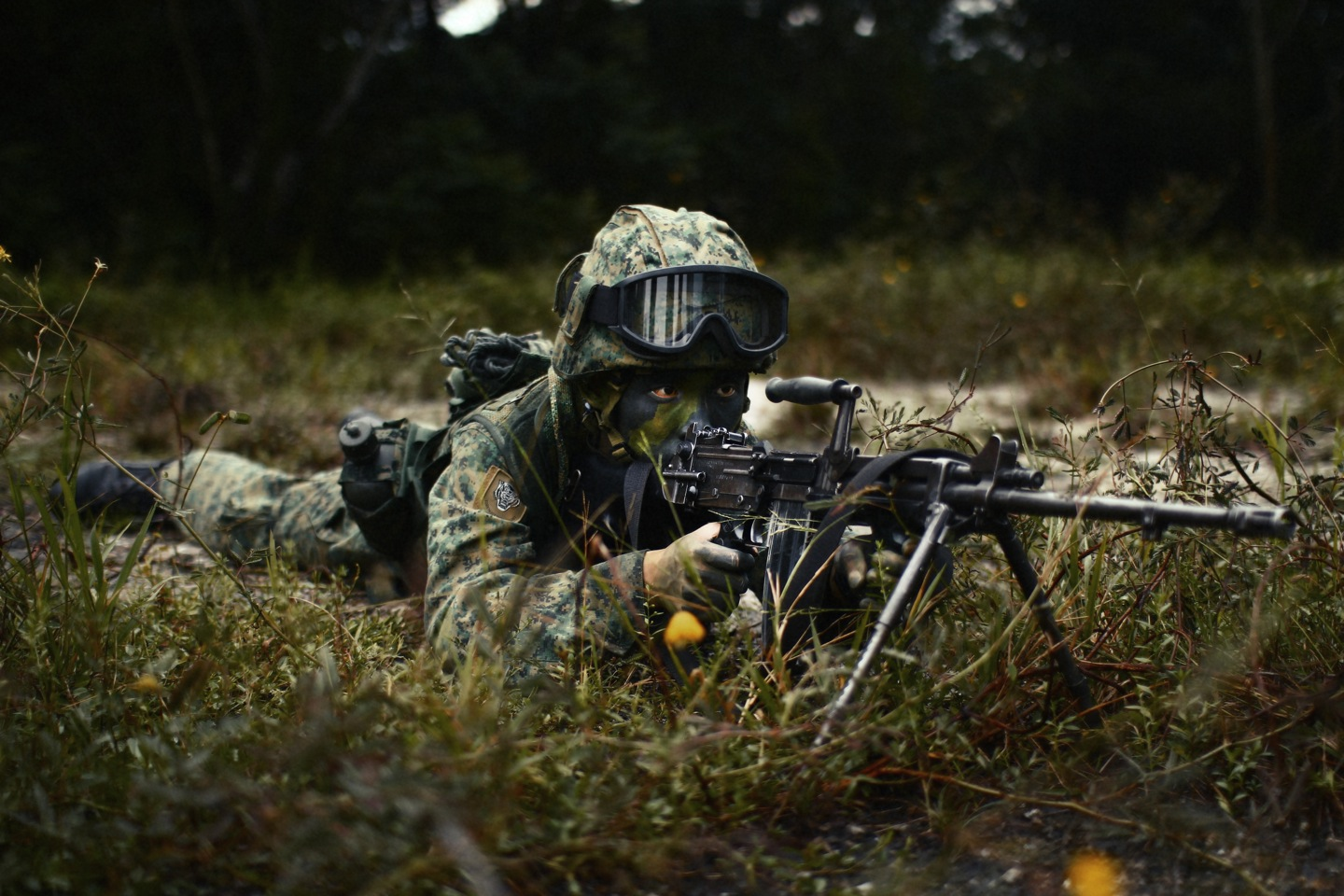
Model	Image	Caliber	Origin
Browning M2		12.7×99mm	United States
FN MAG		7.62×51mm	Belgium
Ultimax 100		5.56×45mm	Singapore

- Sniper rifles

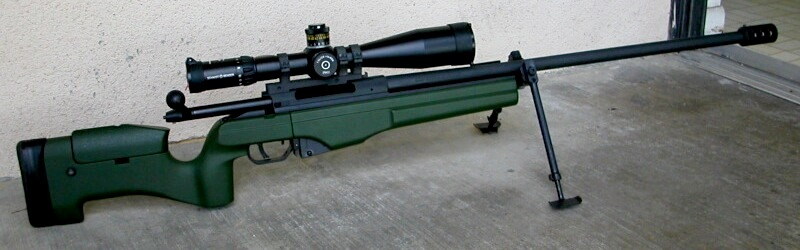
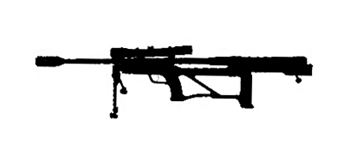
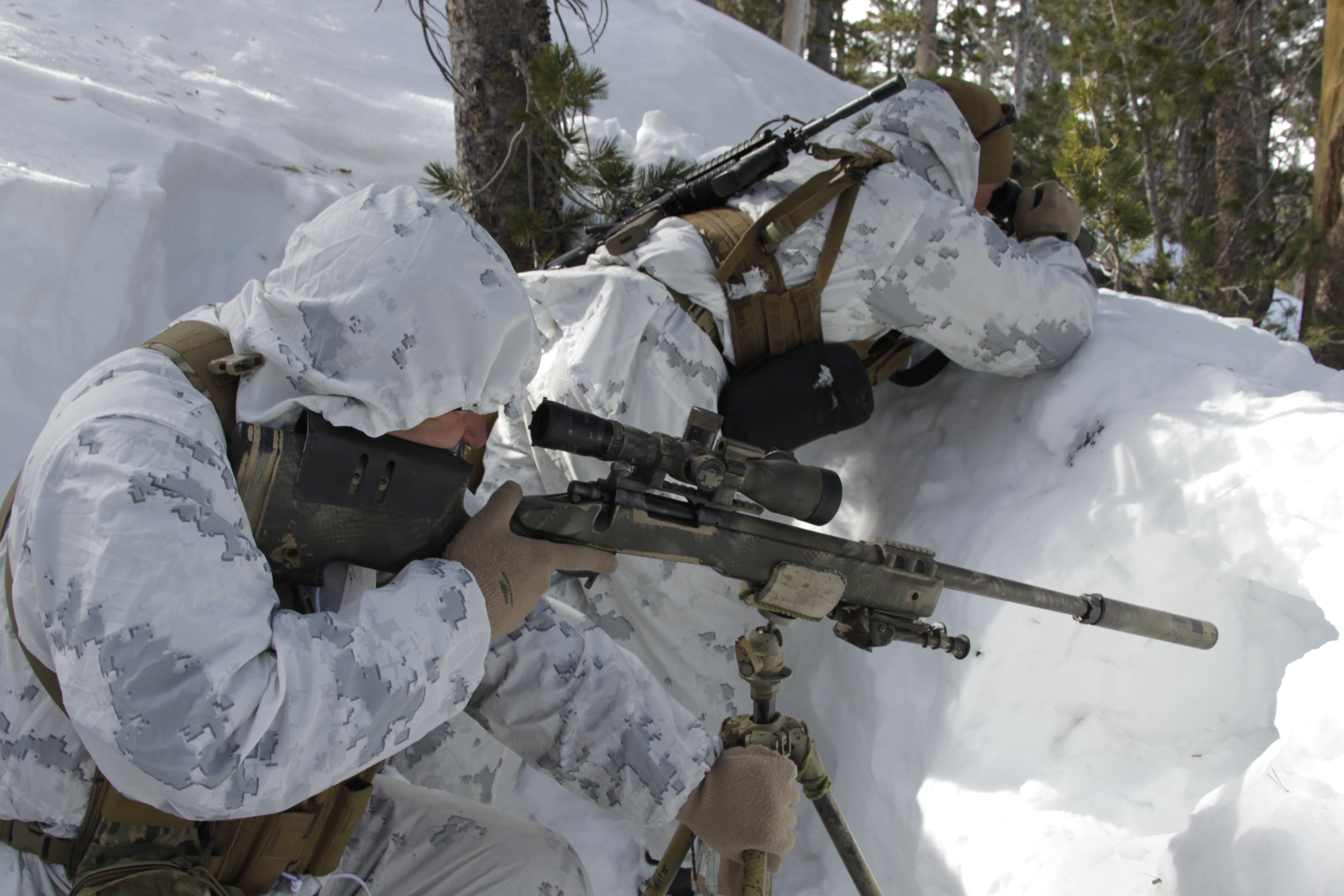
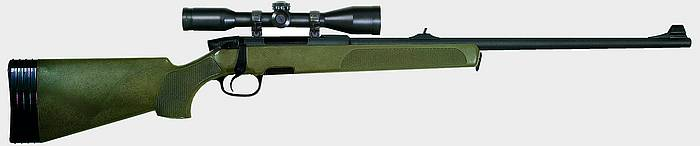
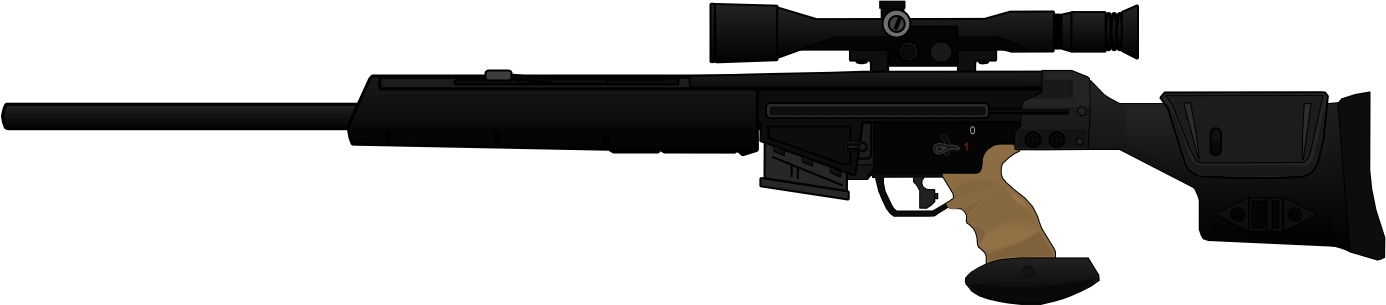
Model	Image	Caliber	Origin	Variants
Sako TRG-42		.300 Winchester Magnum	Finland	TRG-42 .300 Winchester Magnum
MACS M3		12.7×99mm	Croatia	MACS M3 and MACS M4
RT-20		20×110mm	Croatia	M1
M40 rifle		7.62×51	United States	A5
Steyr SSG 69		7.62×51mm	Austria	P4
Heckler & Koch PSG1		7.62×51mm	Germany	PSG1

- Shotguns

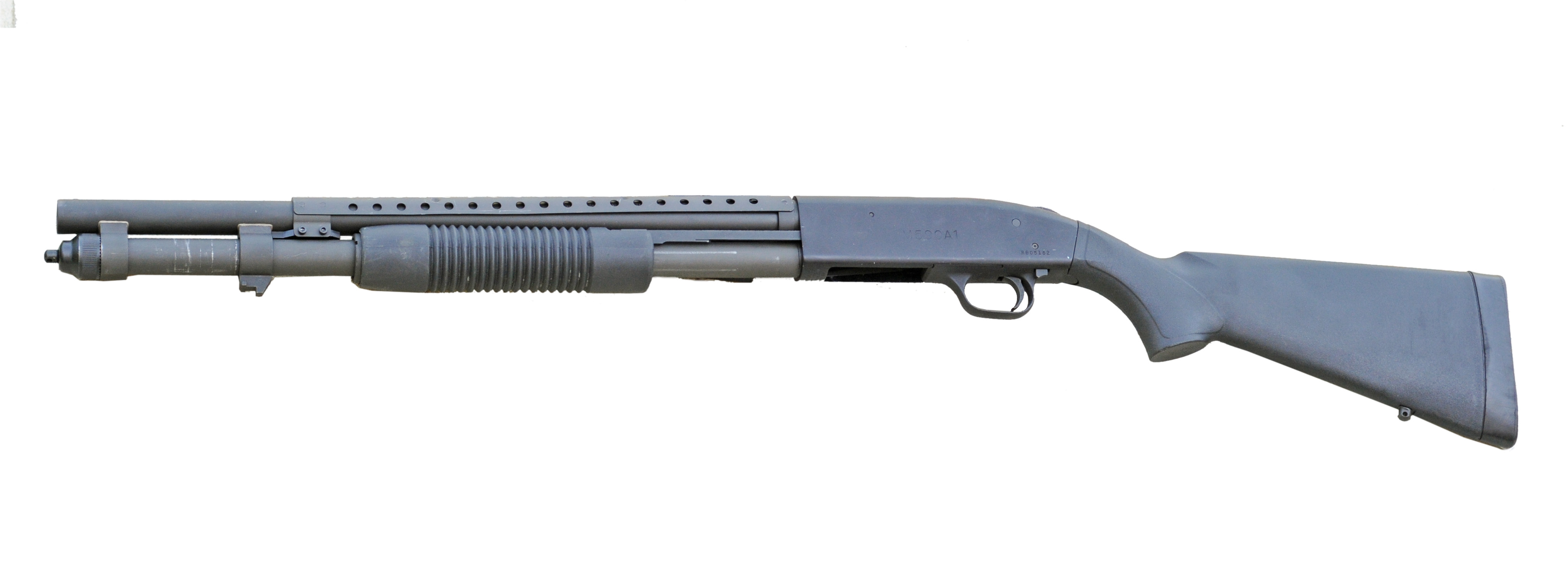
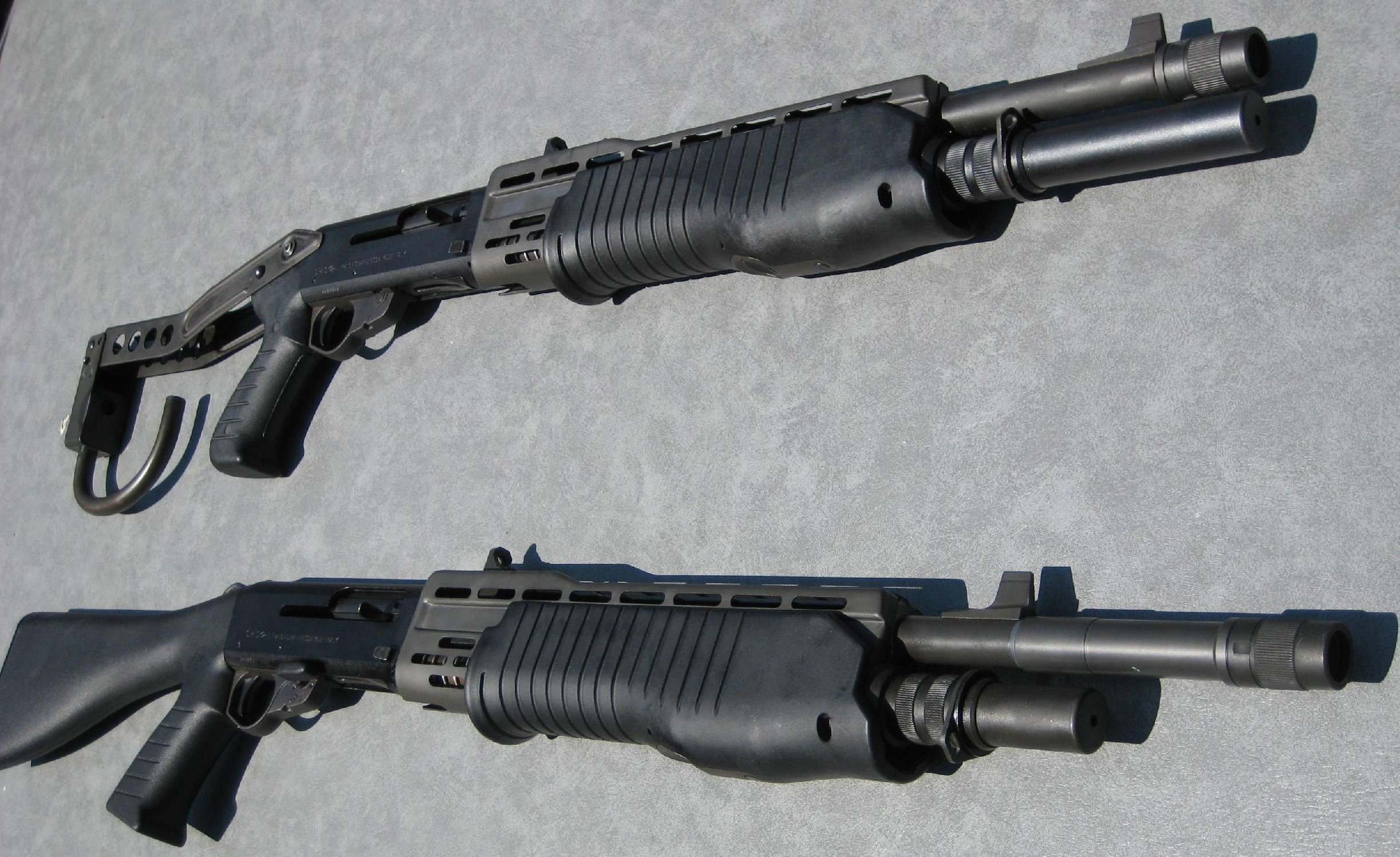
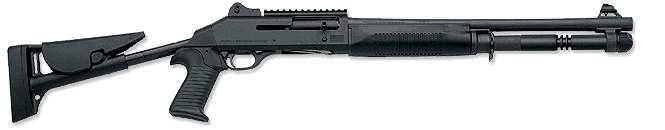
Model	Image	Caliber	Origin	Variants
Mossberg 500		12 gauge,20 gauge,.410 bore	United States	mossberg 500
Franchi SPAS-12		12 gauge	Italy	SPAS-12
Benelli M4 Super 90		12 gauge	Italy	M4

- Grenade launchers

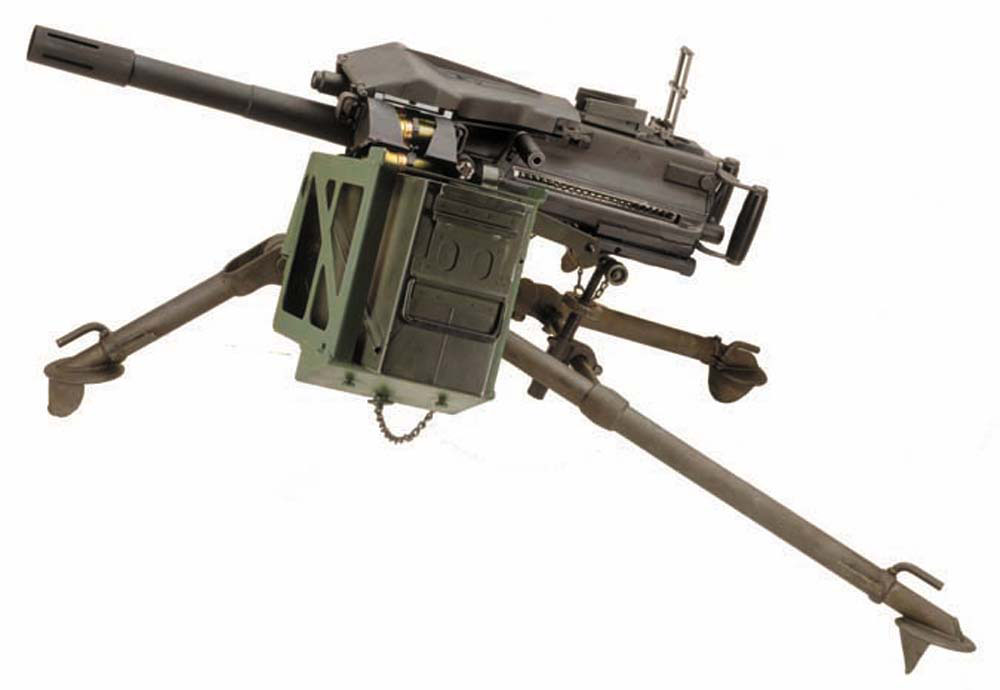
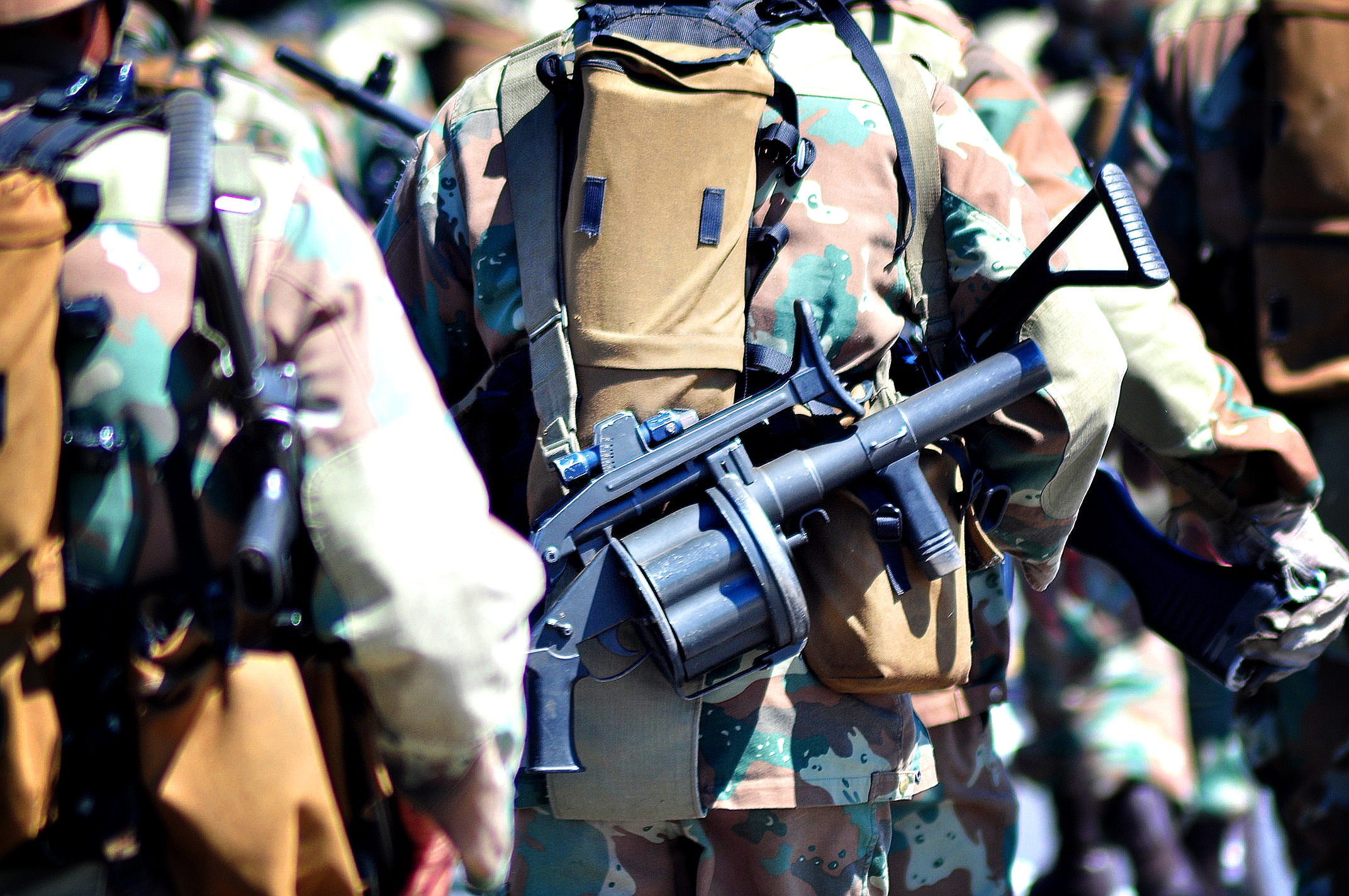
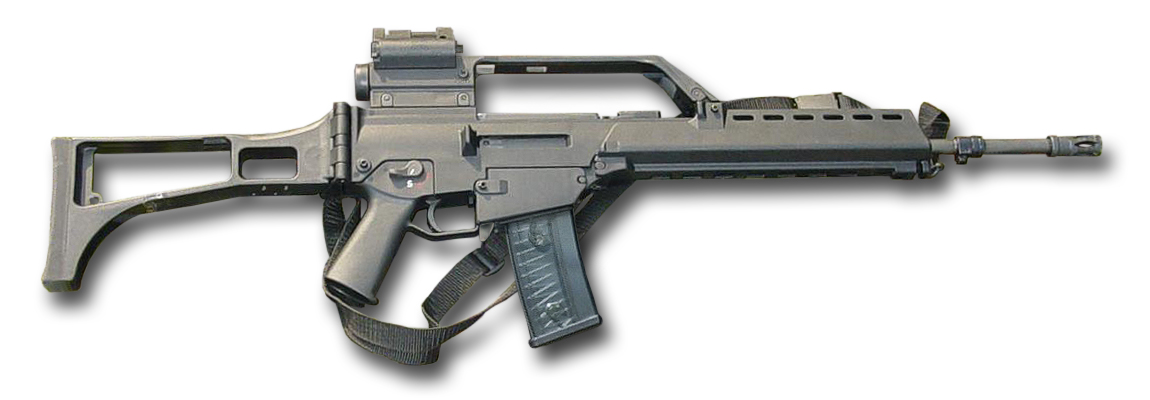
Model	Image	Caliber	Origin	Note
Mk.19 AGL		40×53mm	United States	Used on vehicles
RBG-6		40×46mm	Croatia	Locally produced by Metallic d.o.o., designated RBG-6
H&K AG36		40×46mm	Germany	Comes as standard with all H&K G36C

- Mortars

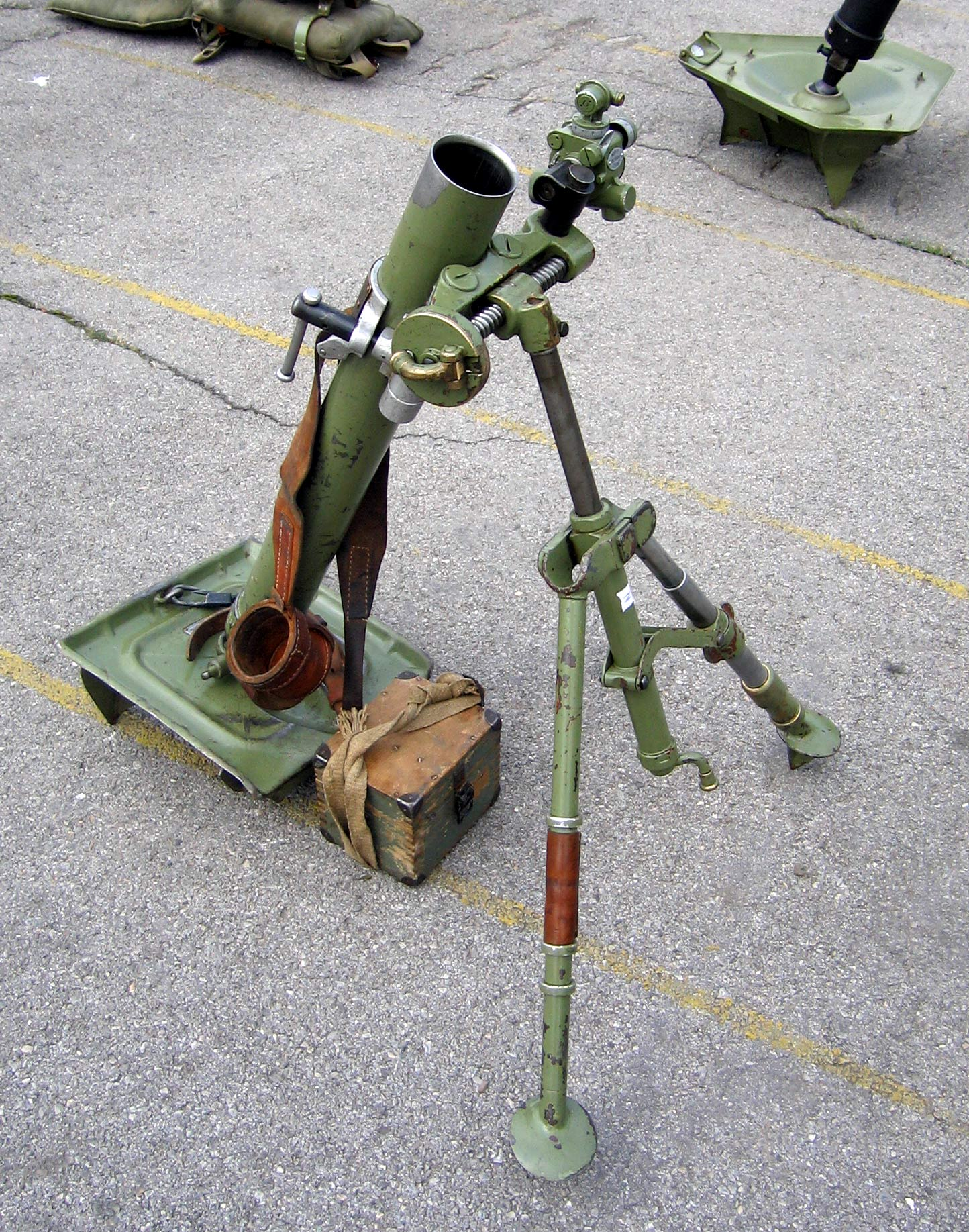
Model	Image	Caliber	Origin	Note
M57		60mm Mortar	Yugoslavia	Mortar underwent modification to meet NATO requirements

- Anti-aircraft weapons

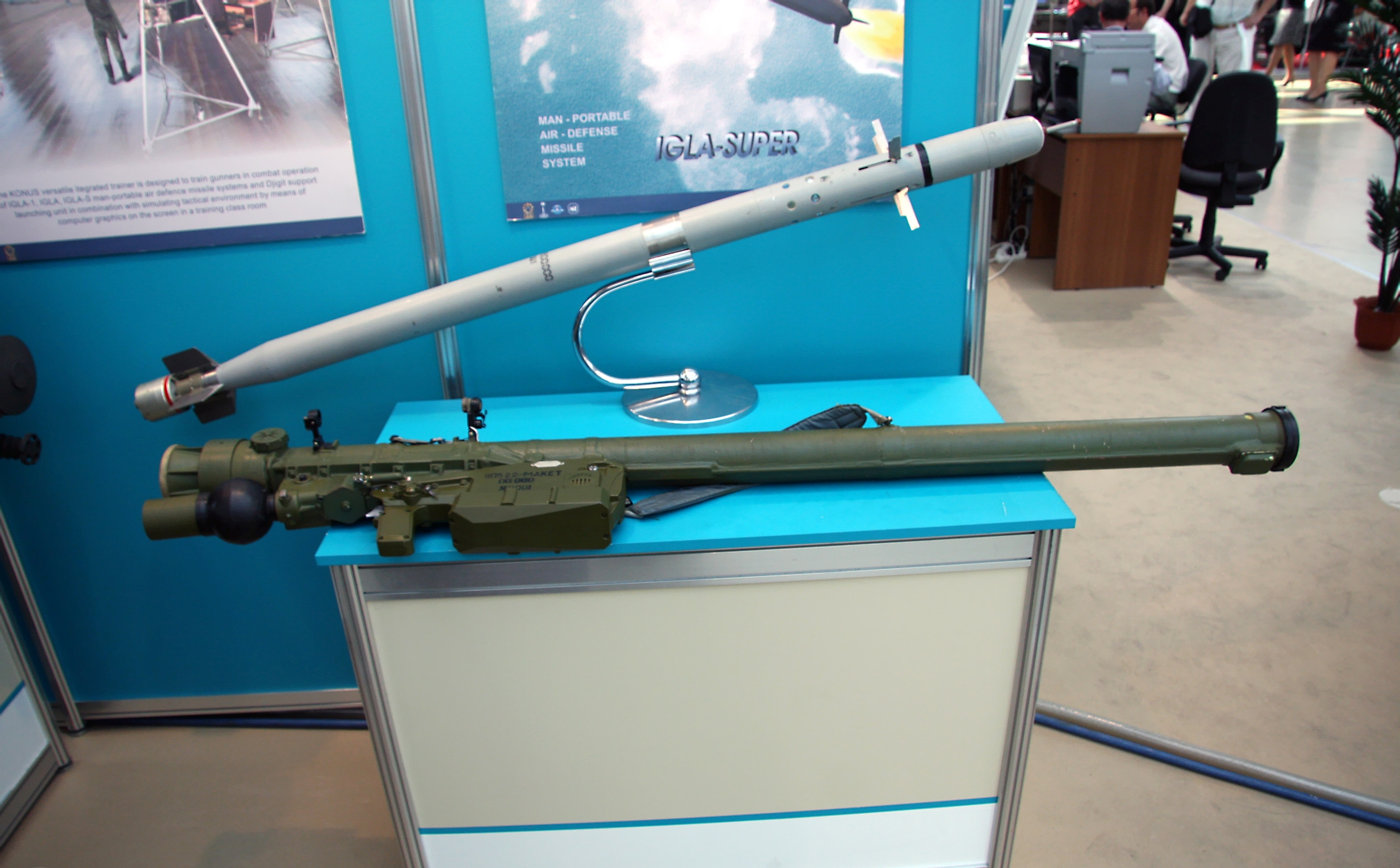
Model	Image	Type	Origin
9K38 Igla		MANPADS	Soviet Union

- Anti-tank weapons

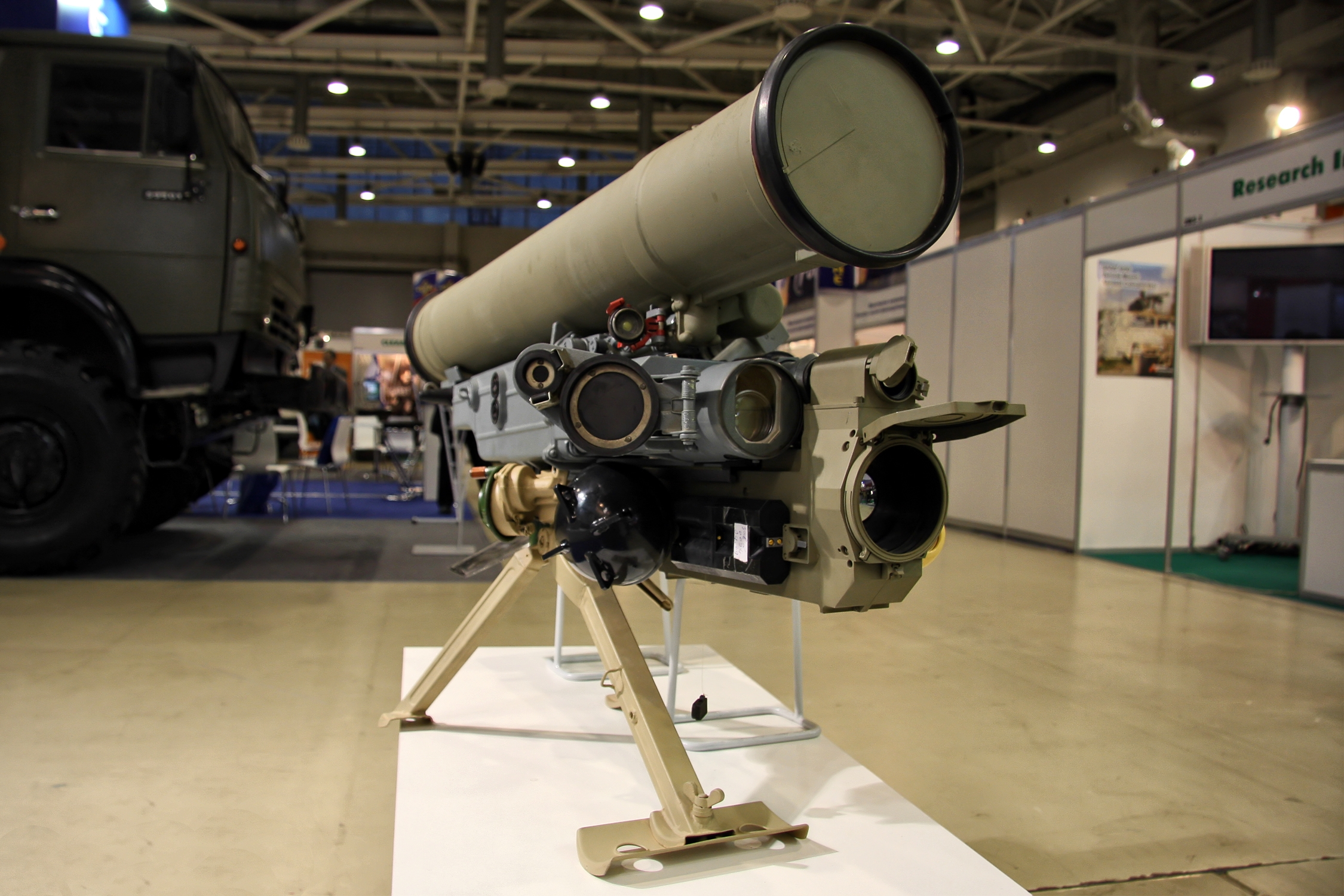
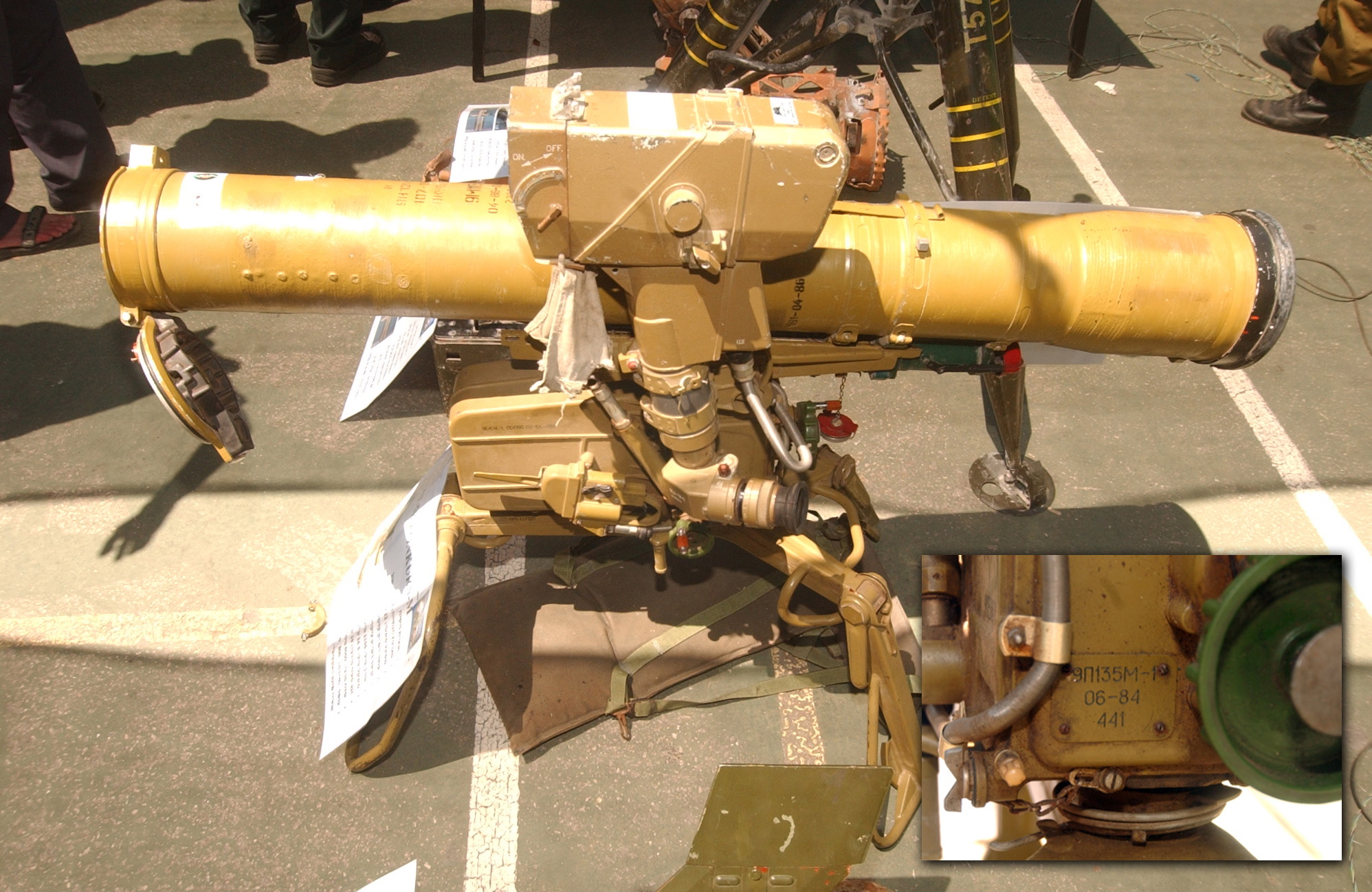
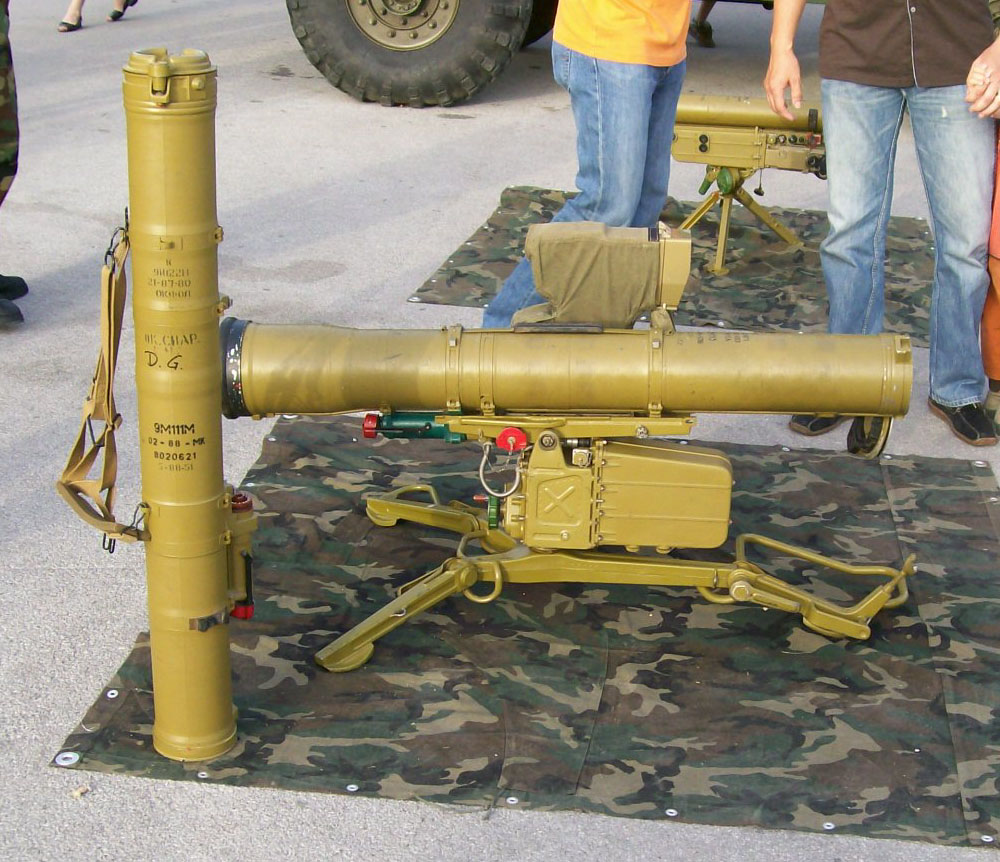
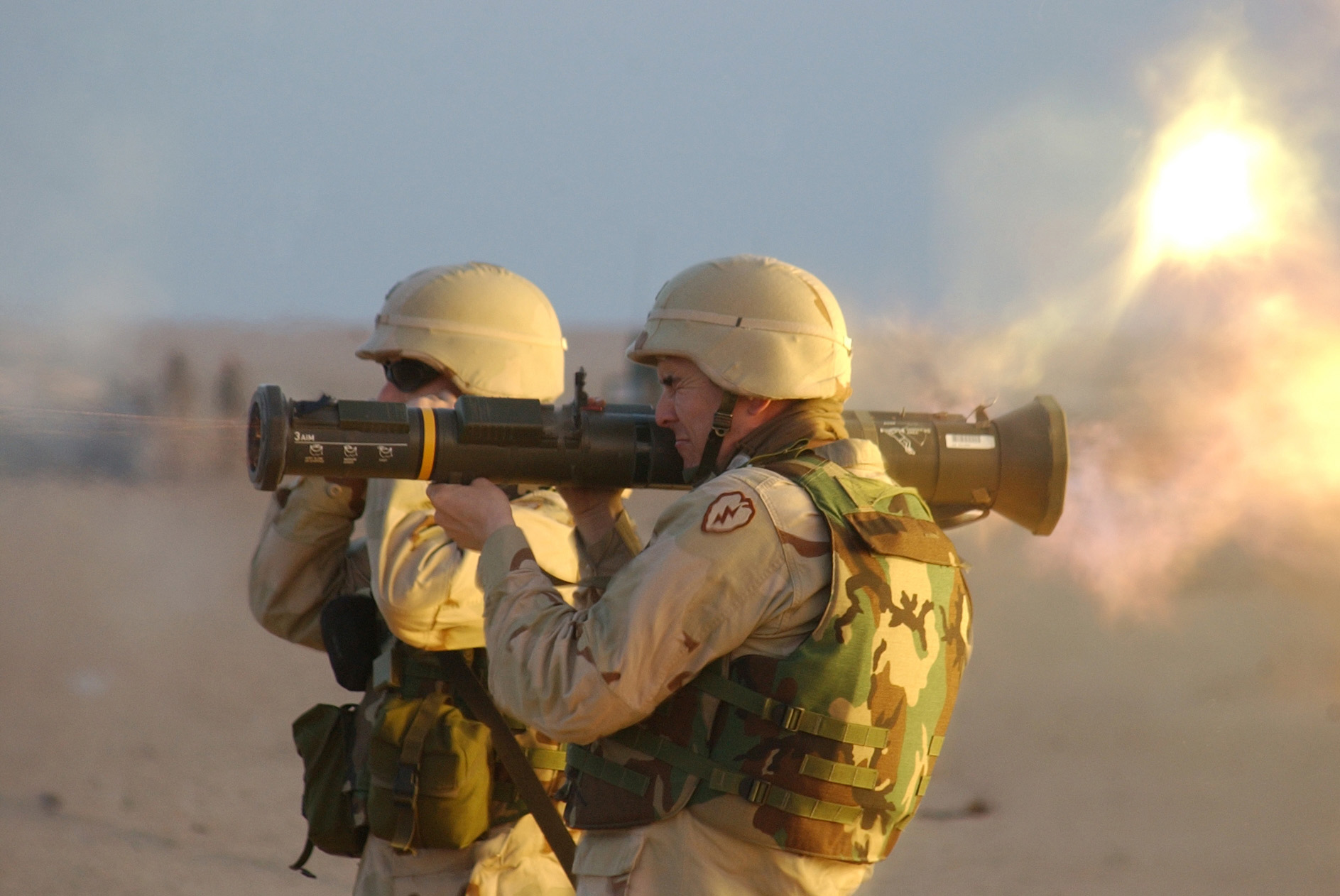
Model	Image	Type	Origin	Note
9К115-2 Metis-M/9K115 Metis		wire-guided anti-tank missile	Soviet Union
9M113 Konkurs		wire-guided anti-tank missile	Soviet Union	To be replaced by Javelin or Eurospike at some point in near future
9K111 Fagot		wire-guided anti-tank missile	Soviet Union	Awaiting replacement by a modern tandem warhead anti tank system
AT4		RPG	Sweden

- Vehicles

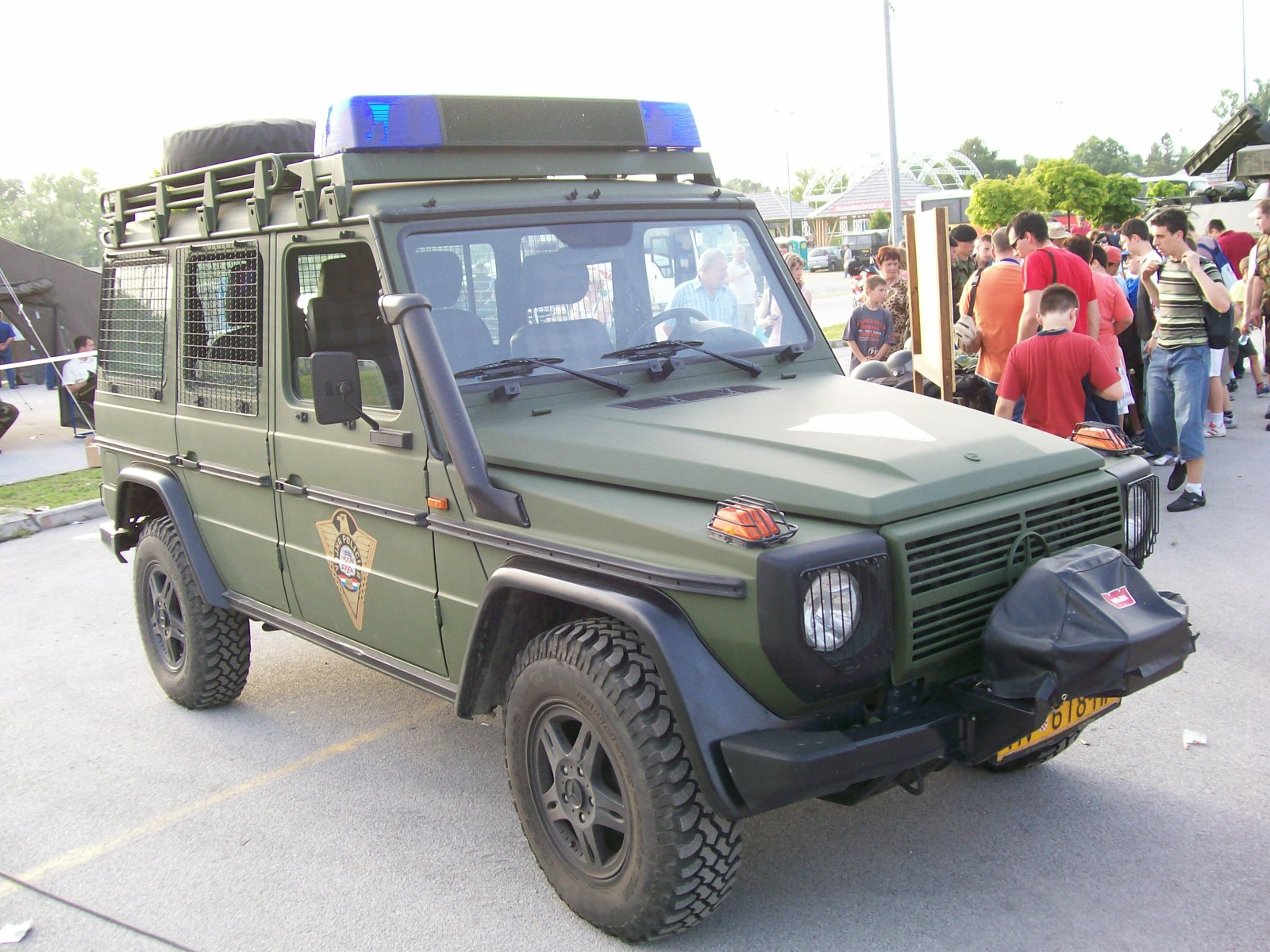
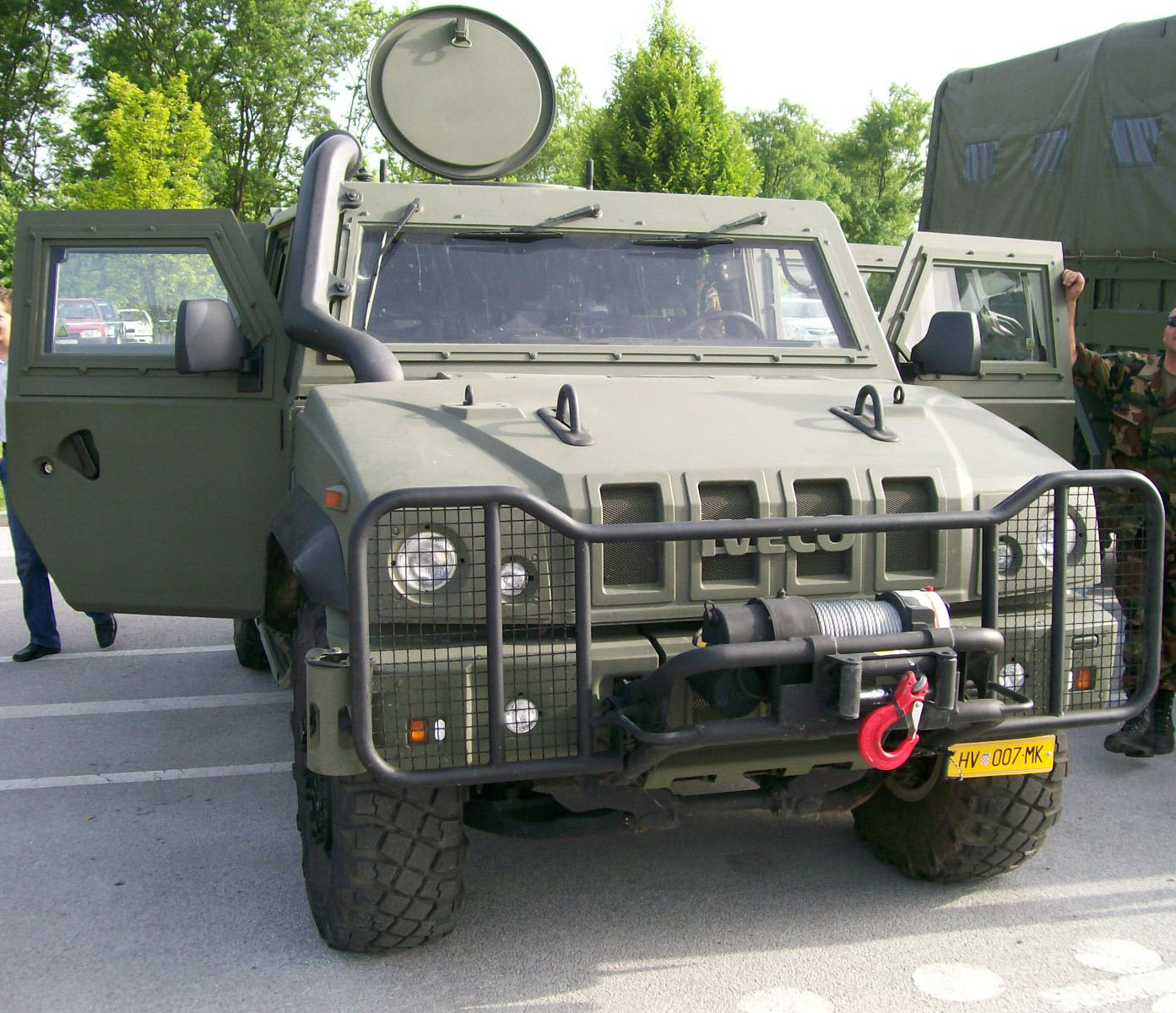
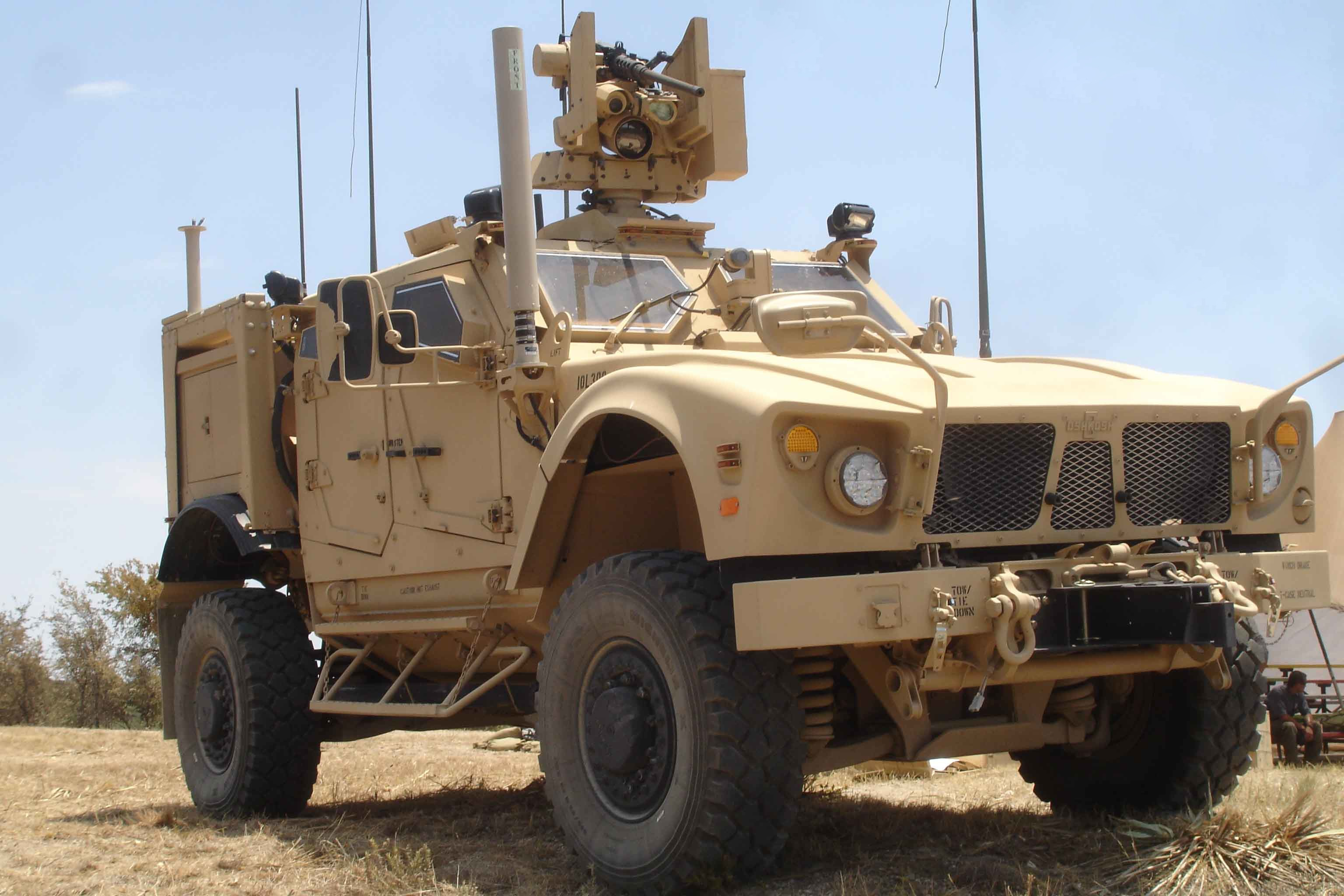
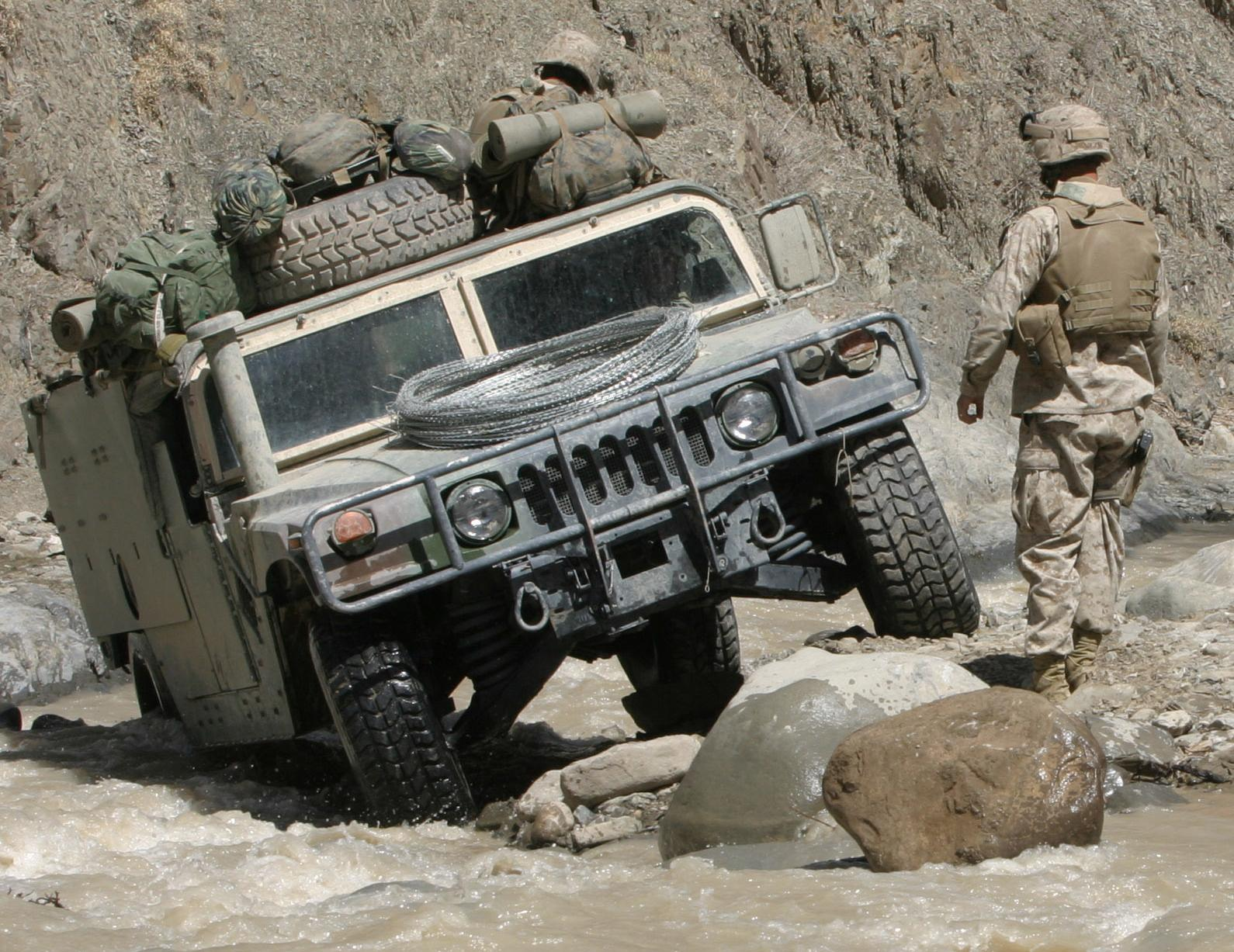
Model	Image	Type	Origin
Mercedes G		Light Utility Vehicle	Germany
Iveco LMV		IMV	Italy
Oshkosh M-ATV		MRAP	United States
M1151 Up-Armored Capable HMMWV		IMV	United States

- Helicopters

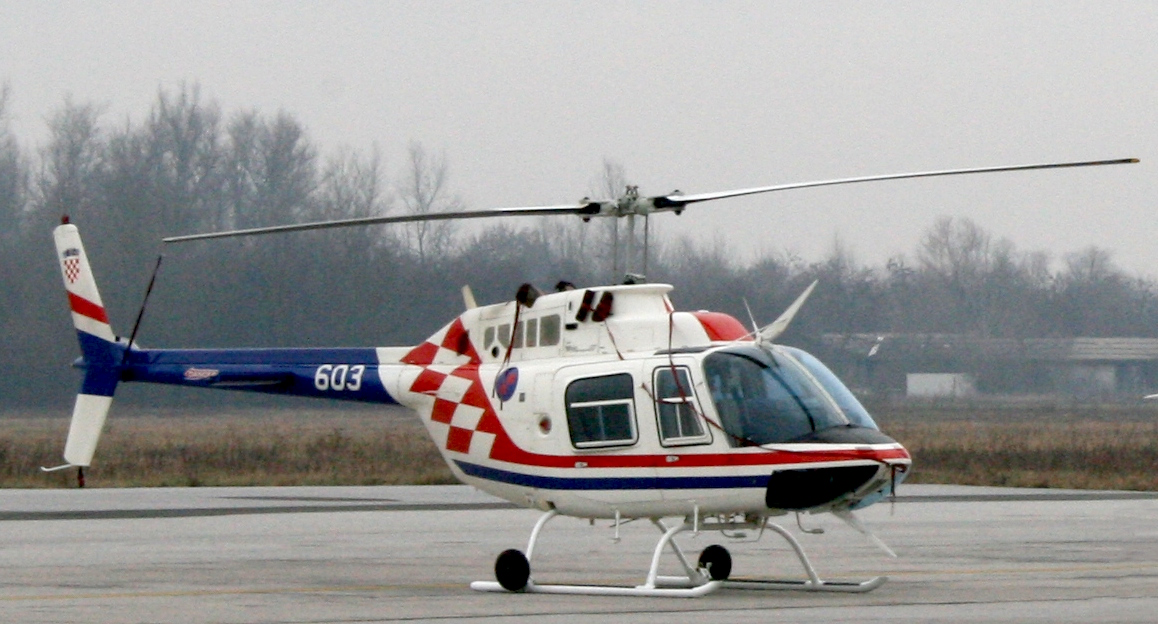
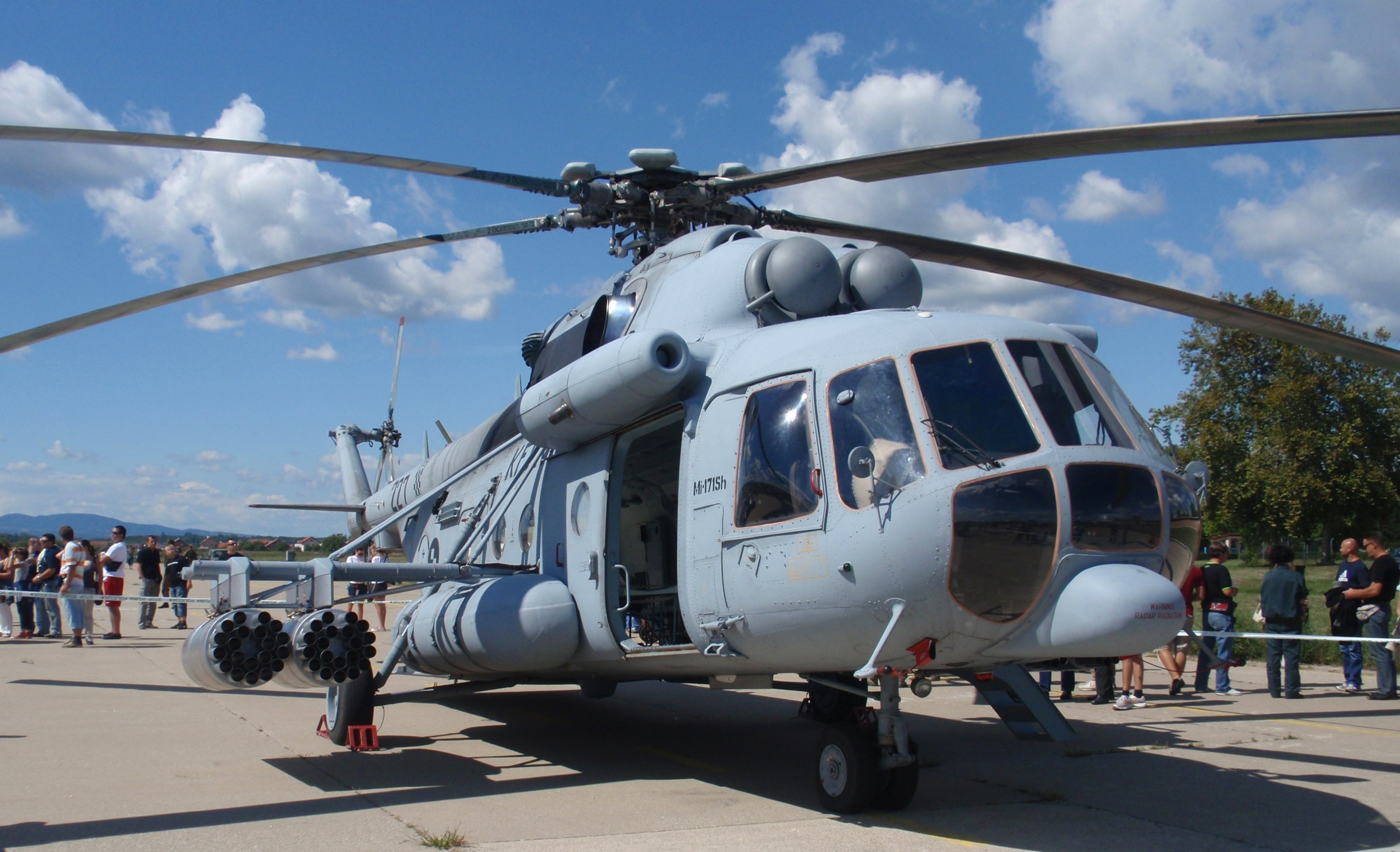
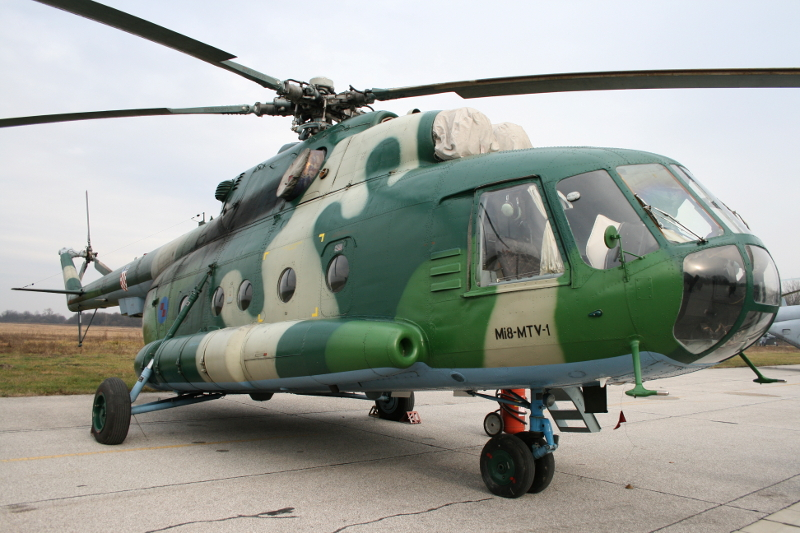
Model	Image	Type	Origin
Bell 206B-3		Utility helicopter	Canada
Mil Mi-171Sh		Combat-support helicopter	Russia
Mi-8MTV-1		Transport helicopter	Russia

=== Vessels ===
- Olimp Nautika M46
- R-2M Mala Diver's Delivery Vessel

== International engagements ==
BSD members have been deployed on several peacekeeping operations and missions in the world. BSD was engaged in EUFOR Tchad/RCA, ISAF within ISAF SOF TF-50 detached from Polish Jednostka Wojskowa Komandosów.

== Gallery ==
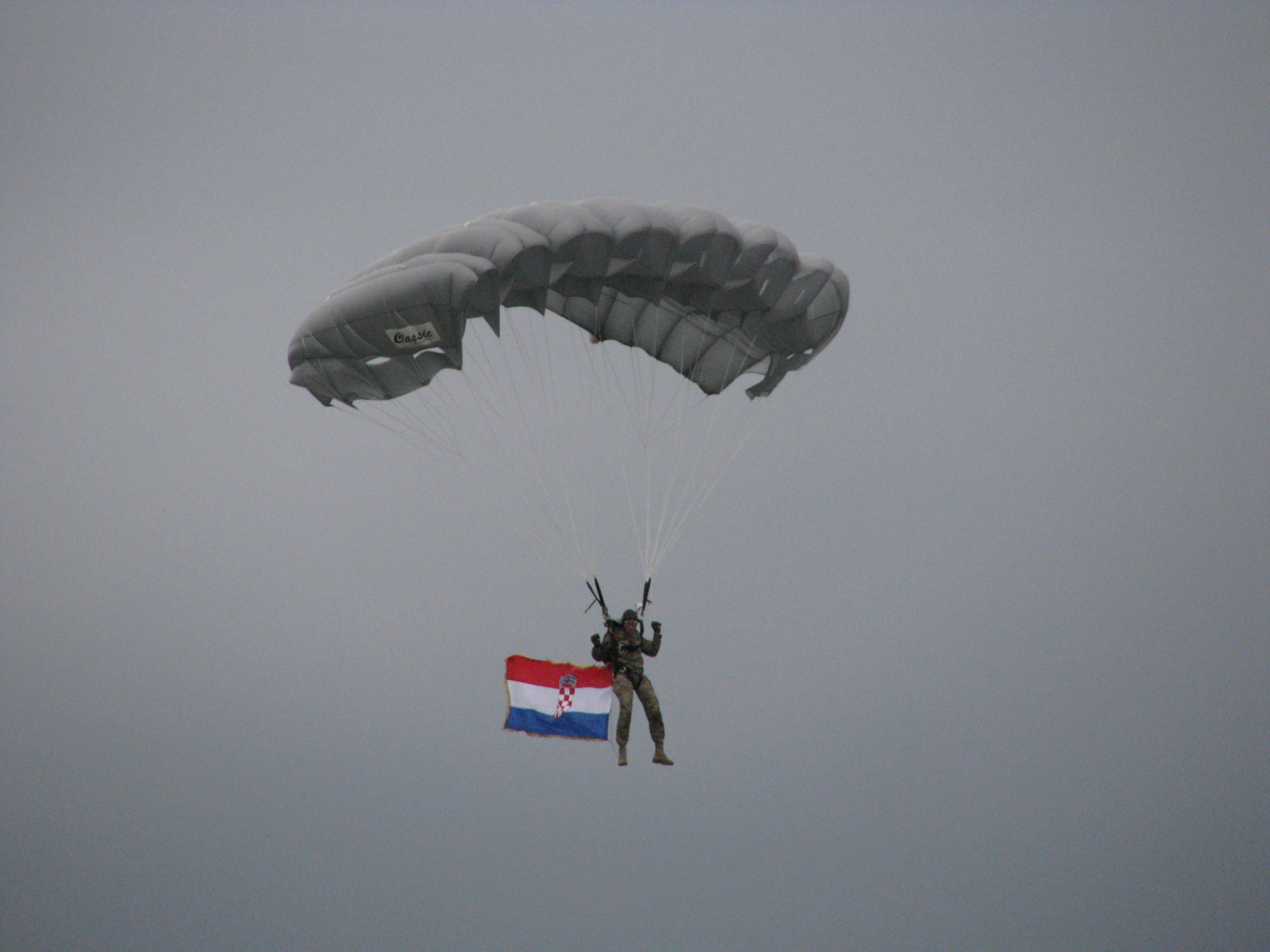

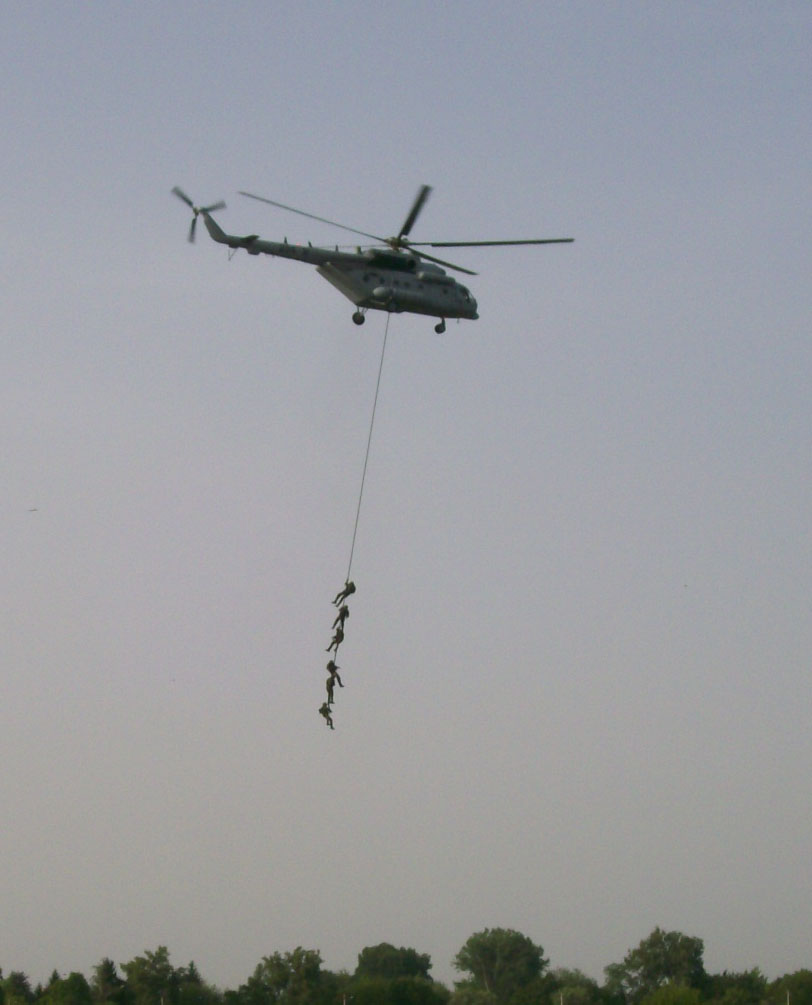

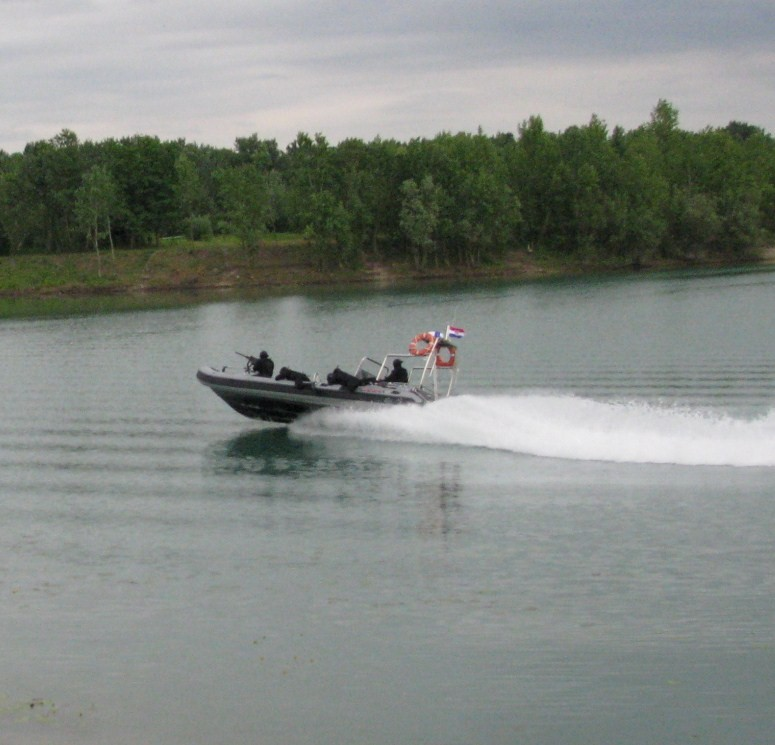

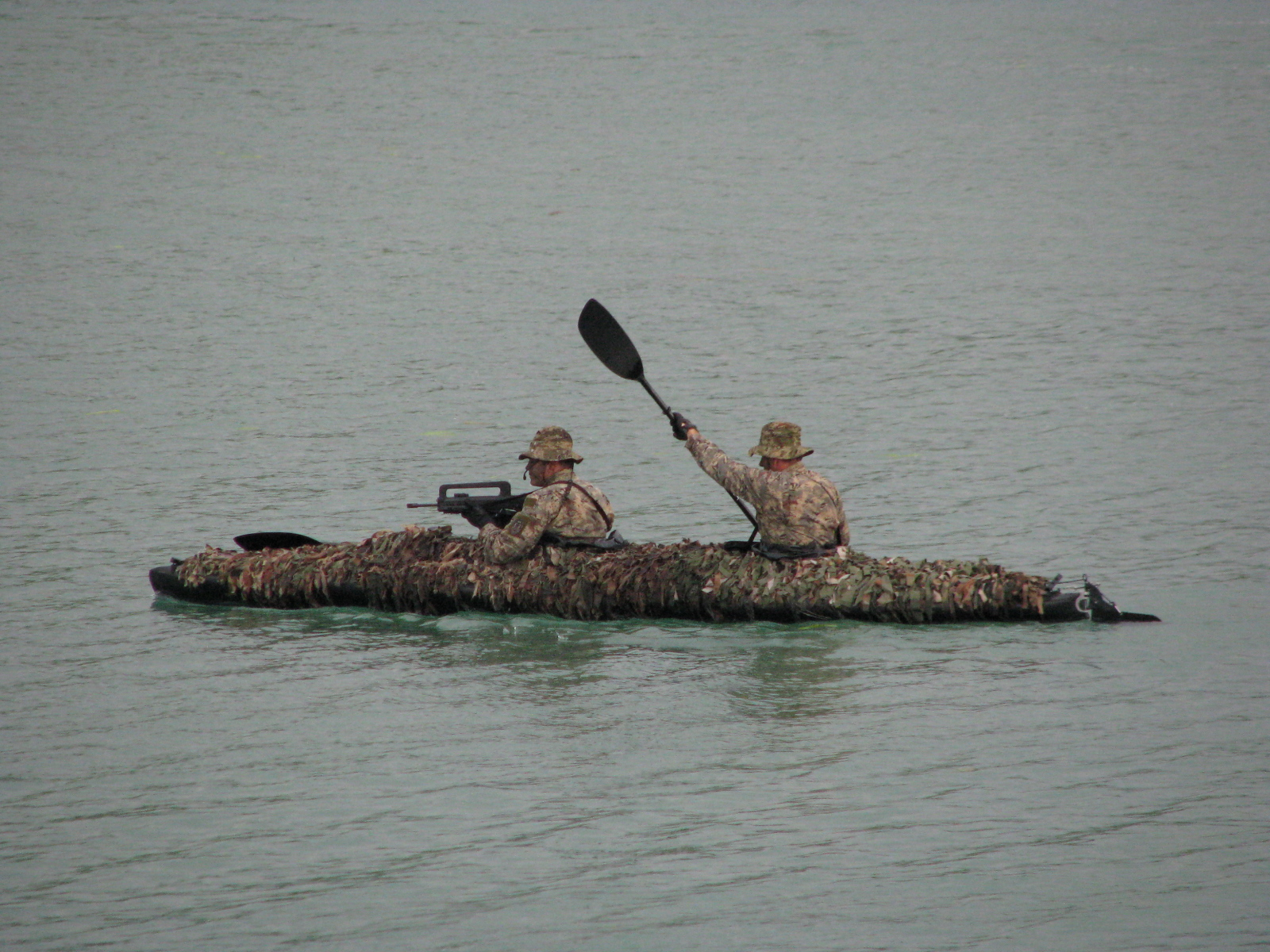

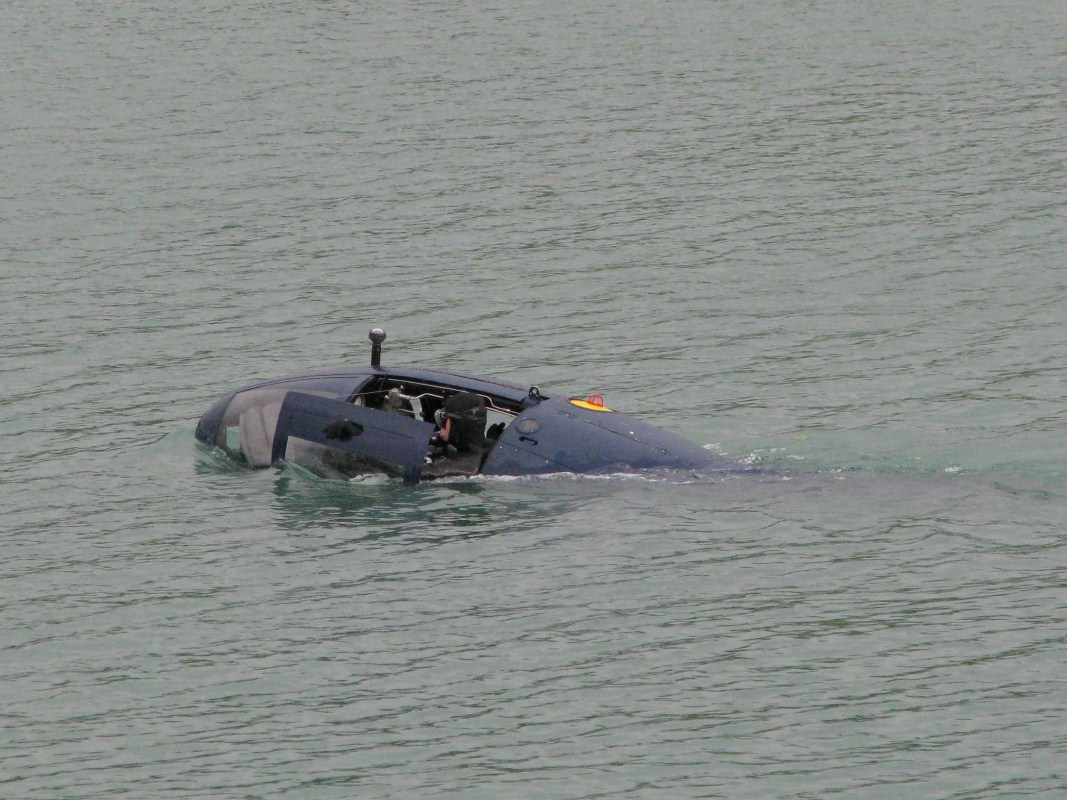

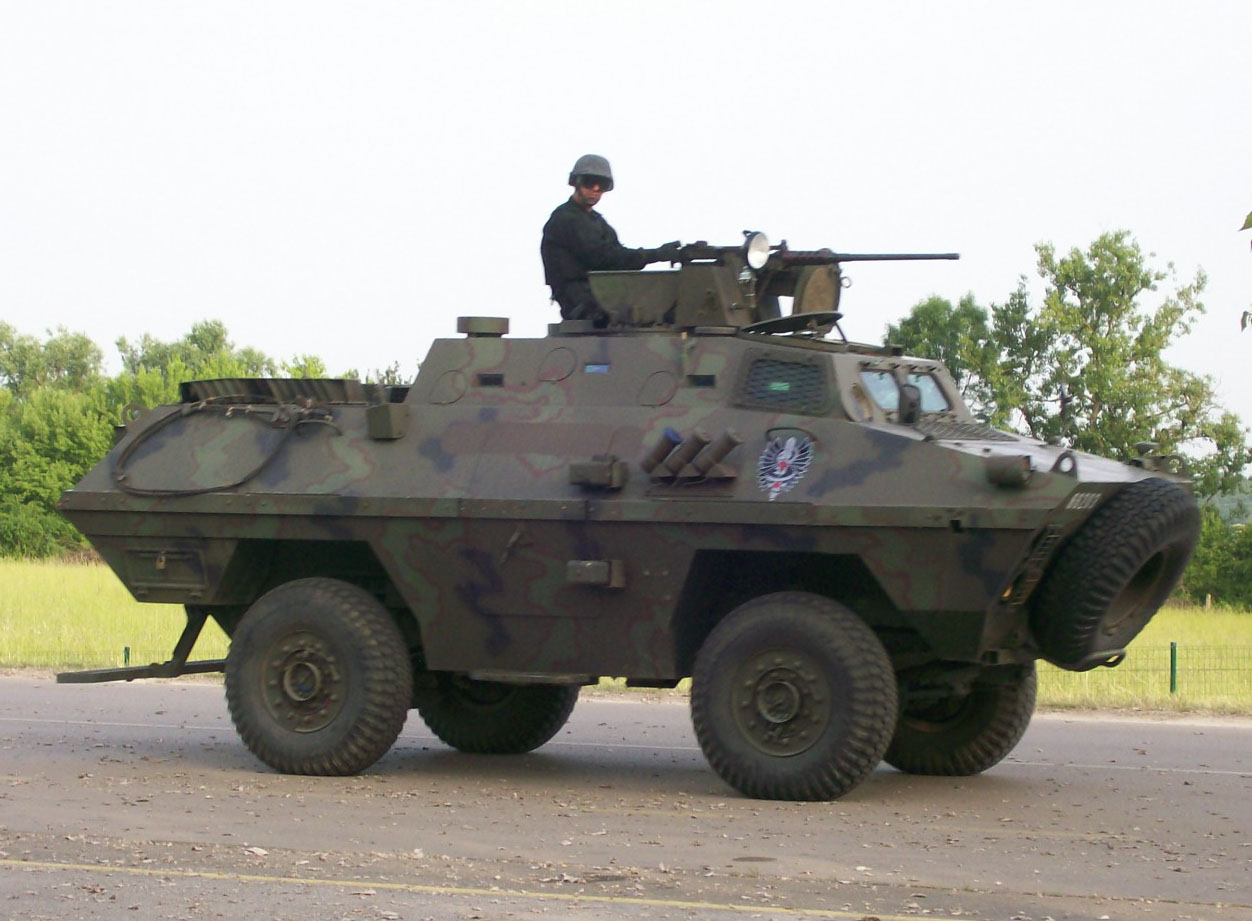
