= Zrinski Battalion =

- Active: 18 May 1991 – 25 February 1994
- Country: Croatia
- Branch: Army
- Type: Special forces
- Size: Battalion
- Garrison/HQ: Kumrovec (at establishment)
- Motto(s): Viribus unitis
- Engagements: Croatian War of Independence: Battle of Hrvatska Kostajnica; Battle of Gospić; Siege of Dubrovnik; Operation Tiger; Operation Maslenica; Bosnian War: Battle of Kupres

Commanders
- Notable commanders: Ante Roso; Miljenko Filipović

The Zrinski Battalion (Croatian: Bojna Zrinski) was a special forces unit of the Croatian National Guard (Zbor narodne garde – ZNG) and later of the Croatian Army (Hrvatska vojska – HV) established in Kumrovec on 18 May 1991, during the Croatian War of Independence. The unit drew personnel from the special police forces and a former French Foreign Legion troops serving as its core. The battalion was set up and initially commanded by Ante Roso, while Major Miljenko Filipović took over as the commanding officer in August.

The Zrinski Battalion trained volunteer troops in Vukovar in June 1991 before it saw action in Hrvatska Kostajnica, the Battle of Gospić and near Slano in 1991. By the end of 1991, the unit's personnel were tasked with setting up an additional special forces unit of the HV. The next year its elements took part in the Battle of Kupres and Operation Tiger aimed at lifting the Siege of Dubrovnik. It also and helped develop and train the Croatian Defence Council (Hrvatsko vijeće obrane – HVO), setting up a training camp in Tomislavgrad. In 1993, the battalion took part in Operation Maslenica. In February 1994, the Zrinski Battalion was amalgamated with several other HV special forces units into the 1st Croatian Guards Brigade (1. hrvatski gardijski zdrug), a component of the 1st Croatian Guards Corps (1. hrvatski gardijski zbor).

== Background ==
In 1990, following the electoral defeat of the government of the Socialist Republic of Croatia, ethnic tensions between Croats and Croatian Serbs worsened. The Yugoslav People's Army (Jugoslavenska narodna armija – JNA) believed Croatia would use the Croatian Territorial Defence Force's (Teritorijalna obrana – TO) equipment to build its own army and confront the JNA itself. In order to minimize the expected resistance, the JNA confiscated the TO weapons. On 17 August, the tensions escalated into an open revolt of the Croatian Serbs.

In the beginning of 1991, Croatia had no regular army. In an effort to bolster its defence, Croatia doubled the size of its police force to about 20,000. The most effective part of the force was the 3,000-strong special police that were deployed in 12 battalions, adopting military organisation. In addition there were 9,000–10,000 regionally organised reserve police. The reserve police were set up in 16 battalions and 10 companies, but they lacked weapons needed to arm many of the troops.

Preparations to set up the Croatian National Guard (Zbor narodne garde – ZNG) began on 12 April 1991. Establishment of the ZNG as a police force with military capabilities was thought necessary by the Croatian authorities following armed clashes in Pakrac and at Plitvice Lakes in March and due to the possibility of further confrontation with the JNA. The ZNG, formally established on 23 April, was tasked with protection of the constitutional order, maintenance of public order, anti-terrorist operations, protection of Croatia's borders, territory, coast and territorial waters, as well as the protection of high-value structures and high-profile persons.

== Service ==
On 18 May 1991, the Zrinski Battalion was established as a special forces unit of the ZNG. The core of the unit consisted of 27 volunteers drawn from the Kumrovec Special Police Unit (SPU). Initially, it relied on former French Foreign Legion troops. The most senior among the former legionnaires was Ante Roso, previously a Sous-Officier (non-commissioned officer – NCO) in the 4th Foreign Regiment. In consequence, Roso was tasked with setting up the unit as its initial commander. Major Miljenko Filipović, likewise a former French Foreign Legion member, was assigned the battalions deputy commander. The unit was based in the village of Kumrovec in the region of Hrvatsko Zagorje, on the grounds of the former "Josip Broz Tito" political school. The site, adjacent to the border of Slovenia, was selected to be inaccessible to Yugoslav Air Force raids without violation of Slovene or possibly Austrian airspace. In June 1991, the Kumrovec SPU was transferred to Sljeme Peak north of Zagreb leaving Kumrovec base to the Zrinski Battalion, as well as the second special forces unit, the Frankopan Battalion.

The Zrinski Battalion was deployed for the first time on 15 June. It was stationed in Vukovar, tasked with preparation of city defences and organisation of volunteer troops. In August, Filipović took over command of the battalion from Roso. The same month, the Zrinski Battalion was deployed to the Banovina, where it pushed the Croatian Serb forces out of the town of Hrvatska Kostajnica. In September, the battalion was deployed to Gospić, where it took part in battle to control Gospić against the JNA. Troops assigned to the battalion captured Kaniža barracks in Gospić. During combat in Gospić, 30 troops of the Zrinski Battalion, assisted by Lučko SPU, captured JNA Major General Trajče Krstevski, along with three armoured personnel carriers (APCs) and 32 soldiers. The unit was deployed to Metković on 28 October, tasked with recapturing Slano from the JNA. After the deployment to Gospić, a part of the unit personnel left to Bosnia and Herzegovina anticipating further conflict there, while the remainder of the unit returned to Kumrovec. The ZNG was renamed the Croatian Army (Hrvatska vojska – HV) on 3 November 1991. In late 1991, personnel of the Zrinski Battalion set up another special forces unit of the HV — the Matija Vlačić Battalion based in Opatija.

In 1992, elements of the Zrinski Battalion took part in the Battle of Kupres, before setting up a training camp in the town of Tomislavgrad. There the battalion personnel assisted in setting up and trained the Croatian Defence Council (Hrvatsko vijeće obrane – HVO). Later that year, elements of the battalion took part in Operation Tiger—aimed at lifting of the Siege of Dubrovnik. In 1993, elements of the Zrinski Battalion took part in Operation Maslenica, fighting in the area of Škabrnja. The Central Intelligence Agency assessed the Zrinski Battalion as one of the best units of the HV.

== Amalgamation ==
On 25 February 1994, the Zrinski Battalion was amalgamated with parts of other special forces units of the HV: Frankopan Battalion, Ban Jelačić Battalion, Matija Vlačić Battalion, Ferdo Sučić Battalion and part of 8th Light Assault Brigade forming the 1st Croatian Guards Brigade (1. hrvatski gardijski zdrug), a component of the 1st Croatian Guards Corps (1. hrvatski gardijski zbor), directly subordinated to the Ministry of Defence rather than the General Staff of the Armed Forces of the Republic of Croatia.
