= Ana Vidjen =

Yugoslav-born Croatian-Serbian sculptor (born 1931)

- Born: 24 October 1931; Pločice, Kingdom of Yugoslavia (now Croatia)
- Died: 11 September 2025 (aged 93); Belgrade, Serbia
- Education: MA Athens School of Fine Arts
- Known for: Sculpture, drawing
- Movement: Modernism

Ana Vidjen (24 October 1931 – 11 September 2025) was a Yugoslav, Croatian and Serbian sculptor. She obtained her MA in sculpture in 1962 at Athens School of Fine Arts, and was encouraged in her chosen field by the Greek feminist poet and writer Eleni Vakalo as well as the painter Milo Milunovic, who founded the Academy of Fine Arts in 1937 (now part of University of Arts in Belgrade). Her work includes sculptures in stone, wood and bronze (both gallery and monumental size), drawings, paintings and ceramics.

She and her husband, Nikola Milunovic, realised a large-scale monument for the victims of Nazi terror at Banjica concentration camp in Belgrade, Serbia. Their son is the painter Mihael Milunović.

== Early life and education ==
Vidjen was born in Pločice, a small town in Konavli Dubrovnik countryside in Croatia then Kingdom of Yugoslavia, to Ivan Vidjen and Ana Kovačević. Her father was a supervisor on tracing and laying down the south-east railways of Austria-Hungary, prior to World War I. When Ana, the youngest child, was born, her father was a railway station master of Pločice train station, and her mother was a housewife and artist. She grew up in Cavtat together with her sister and her two brothers. She spent most of her childhood time playing in woods, and in the nature, collecting shells and stones. After the liberation post-World War II, her family encouraged her to apply to the famous Art High School – Umjetnička Škola in Herceg Novi, Montenegro at age 15. After completing her studies in the sculpture class of professors Vojislav Vojo Stanić and prof. Poček, she enrolled in 1954 at the Academy of Fine Arts (today University of Arts in Belgrade) and moved to Belgrade. She received a Bachelor of Arts and Master of Arts in Fine Arts from the institution in 1961.

== Period 1962–1974 ==
After graduating, Vidjen received a Yugoslav State Scholarship to pursue her MA studies in Athens, Greece, on Academy of Fine Arts in class of professors Michael Tombros and George Zongolopoulos. She was fascinated with Cycladic art sculptures and Archaic Greek forms, and in the artistic and intellectual circles of Athens of that time she met many artists, writers, and composers. One of her closest friends was the famous feminist art critic, poet and writer Eleni Vakalo. Vakalo wrote several major texts about Vidjen's work and published articles in "Ta Nea" newspaper. The Ambassador of Yugoslavia to Greece, Peko Dapčević, was fond of Vidjen's art and introduced her to people in Athenian high society circles.

On her return to Yugoslavia she married Nikola Milunović, sculptor, son of prominent Yugoslav painter Milo Milunović, founder of University of Arts in Belgrade in 1937 under the regency of Prince Paul of Yugoslavia. The couple settled in the Belgrade neighbourhood of Dedinje in Milunović family villa in Tolstojeva street Nr.9. They started working together on many projects, as well as the realisation of large-scale mosaic projects of her father-in-law, Milo Milunovic.

In 1963, Vidjen was invited to attend the reception given by the British Ambassador to Yugoslavia on the occasion of the first official visit of Queen Elizabeth II and Prince Philip, Duke of Edinburgh to Socialist Federal Republic of Yugoslavia, which was also attended by the president Josip Broz Tito and his wife Jovanka Broz. After meeting the royal couple, one of her sculptures was commissioned for the contemporary art section of Royal Collection in Buckingham Palace, London.

In 1966 she exhibited new drawings in the show "Fantastica" in Brussels. An informal artistic movement, Medijala, arose in Yugoslav artistic circles in the late 1950s and early 1960s, and Vidjen embraced the movement for her figurative works, both drawings and sculptures. In 1967, she appeared in the International Sculpture Exhibition in den Hague and was selected for the exhibition "Four Yugoslav Sculptors" in Galerie D'Ent in Amsterdam. That year, she also realised the marble sculpture "Dry Age," which is on permanent display in the sculpture park in Arandjelovac, Serbia. Other sculptures from this period include the monumental-size "Shell," as well as the Monument to Victims of Banjica Concentration Camp in Belgrade in 1969.

== Period 1974–2019 ==
Her "Flourishing Form", realised in 1975, was purchased for the collection of Museum of Contemporary Art, Belgrade. "The Fruit" (1980), realised in marble, is now part of the sculpture park in Danilovgrad, Montenegro.

During this period, Vidjen won several major national art prizes, such as the Union of Fine Artists of Serbia prize in 1974, the Winter Salon prize in 1983 in Herceg Novi, and 1st prize for the Monument of Petar I Petrović-Njegoš. She later realised a three-dimensional, monumental portrait of this XVIII century ruler of Montenegro. This sculpture is located in Danilovgrad in Montenegro.

Vidjen participated several times in Prilep Marble Sculpture Symposium, where she left a number of monumental-sized sculptures in the sculpture park. Twice, she won the Grand Prix of Biennial of Miniature Art in Gornji Milanovac, as well as Production Prize at the 1992 October Salon in Belgrade.

She also attended the International Symposium TERRA in Kikinda several times, where she produced a large number of large scale-sculptures in terracota, some of which are now part of the Symposium's permanent collection.

One of her last bigger solo exhibitions took place in the ULUS (Union of Fine Artists of Serbia) Gallery in Belgrade in 2005, where large terracota sculptures were shown along with large drawings. She lives and works in Belgrade, Serbia.

== Solo exhibitions ==
- 1962 Athens, Greece
- 1965 Belgrade, Serbia
- 1967 Amsterdam and Den Hague
- 1972 Belgrade, Serbia
- 1982 Podgorica, Montenegro
- 1987 Dubrovnik, Croatia
- 1990 Paris, France
- 2003 Kikinda, Serbia
- 2005 Galerija Ulus, Belgrade, Serbia

== Prizes ==
- 1st Prize Young Creatives of Montenegro 1953
- Special Prize of Biennale of Yugoslav Sculpture 1973
- ULUS prize on Spring Exhibition of Union of Serbian Artists, Belgrade 1974
- 1st Prize of Winter Salon, Herceg Novi, 1983
- 1st Prize for Petar I Petrović Monument, Danilovgrad 1983
- 1st Prize for Open Air Sculpture «Prostor» 1984
- 1st Prize on International Biennale of Miniature Art, Gornji Milanovac 1990 and 1992
- Production Prize, October Salon, Belgrade, 1992

== Plein Air Sculptures ==
- Sculpture Park, Aranđelovac, Serbia
- Sculpture in park of EI Factory, Belgrade
- Sculpture Park, Vrnjačka Banja, Serbia
- Sculpture Park, Prilep, Macedonia
- Sculpture Park, Danilovgrad, Montenegro
- Monument of Petar I Petrovic, Danilovgrad, Montenegro
- Sculpture Park Terra, Kikinda, Serbia

== Collections ==
- Museum of Contemporary Art, Belgrade
- Contemporary Art Museum of Macedonia, Skopje
- National Museum of Montenegro, Cetinje
- Museum of Yugoslavia formerly Museum of Revolution, Belgrade
- Ministry of Culture, Podgorica, Montenegro

== Sources ==
- Blic Newspaper, 19 July 2005 Skulpture i crteži Ane Viđen
