= Yiannis Poulakas =

Greek painter and scenographer

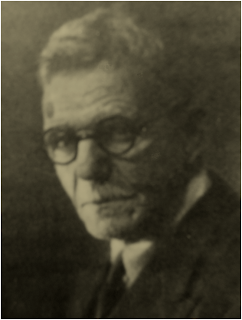
Poulakas in 1937

Yiannis Poulakas (Greek: Ιωάννης Πούλακας; 1 January 1863 – 21 February 1942) was a Greek painter and scenographer. Poulakas was professionally concerned primarily with scenography and secondarily with painting.

== Personal life ==
His family was of modest means. He was a highly promising pupil, earning a scholarship and transferred at the age of fourteen from Volos to Constantinople, where he finished high school and studied drawing, scenography and music. Poulakas studied Byzantine art, as well as the various European artistic movements of the time.

He married Angeliki Haidas (1871–1962). The couple had three sons: George (1888–1918), Konstantinos (1891–1924, Michael (1894–1965), and two daughters: Maria Poulakas-Vrettos (1903–1997) and Merope Poulakas-Loizou (1906–1993).

Poulakas' liberal political ideas cost him teaching positions during 1916–1917 and 1927–1928.

He died of pulmonary edema in Athens on 21 February 1942.

== Career ==
=== Constantinople 1878–1885 ===
He found occupational opportunities in the theatre, especially during the last two years of his residence in Constantinople. Poulakas is the first Greek scenographer who worked in Greece, as the art historian and folklorist Fotis Voyiatzis showed in his study of scenography when discussing George Vakalo (1902–1991). Poulakas worked initially as an apprentice in a workshop for painting, woodwork and production of theatrical sets and later as a scenographer and stage technician in the Hellenic amateur theatre, which was in bloom at the time and in various performances of the leading professional Hellenic theatrical companies that toured in Constantinople.

=== Athens (1885–1901) ===
In 1885 he returned to Volos to join the army. He was immediately transferred to Athens to serve in the Artillery Band as a musician. In 1888 he decided to stay in the army until 1890. This enlistment, together with his settling in Athens in Angeliki's family home, made it possible for him to extend his studies at the Athens School of the Fine Arts, attending painting courses by Nikiforos Lytras and perspective drawing by Vicenzo Lanza, from which he graduated with honors in 1891. He was in contact with Konstantinos Volanakis, who became his close friend when he removed with his family to Piraeus about 1895. They used to exchange photographs and engravings of marine themes. However, no evidence confirms a teacher-student relationship between Volanakis and Poulakas. although this is alleged in other sources, presumably due to their academic painting style and common use of marine themes. Poulakas’ wife described their relationship as one of sincere friendship and mutual appreciation. Between 1883 and 1903 when Volanakis taught Elementary Graphistics in the School of Arts Poulakas attended other courses and when Volonakis founded his "Cultural Center" for young painters in Piraeus about 1895, Poulakas had finished his studies and was already working as a painter and scenographer.

Poulakas' paintings of this period, published in several art catalogues and websites, including Attica Shores, Young Angler and Fisherman at dawn and many paintings of three-masted sailing ships, such as Three-masted ship

Poulakas practiced icon painting from his early years, following an academic and naturalistic style. According to historical sources, Poulakas is the first modern Thessalian icon painter. His name became known in Athens and he began getting orders in 1890. For two years he worked with Othon Giavopoulos, a folk painter from Vytina (Greece), whom Poulakas introduced to the academic style.

Besides painting, Poulakas worked professionally as a scenographer. His works are known mainly from the testimony of his wife and descendants, since that time the name of the scenographer was not recorded in theatrical programs and posters. His known early employment includes the following productions:

- The Fate of Maroula, a romantic comedy by Dimitrios Koromilas (1850–1898), starring Dionyssios Tavoularis (1840–1928) and Evangelos Pantopoulos (1860–1913) in 1889, presenting the inaugural show for the Hellenic Theater in the new wooden theatre in Neo Faliro.
- The Shepherdess’s Sweetheart, a pastoral drama by the same author, launched by the Tavoularis brothers in 1892.
- The Fairy of the Castle, a romance by Dimitrios Kampouroglous, presented by Tavoularis and Pantopoulos in 1894.

After this, he regularly created scenographies for the Ancient and New Hellenic Theatres at the Municipal Theatre of Piraeus, which was inaugurated in April 1895 with the famous contemporary play Maria Doxapatri by Dimitrios Vernardakis (1833–1907), presented by Tavoularis, with scenography by Poulakas.

The screen of the last act, "Sun’s Chariot", part of his scenography for the tragedy of Medea in 1895, survived in the warehouse of the Municipal Theatre of Piraeus at least until 1970.

=== Volos 1901–1924 ===
In 1901 Poulakas left Athens for Volos to become professor of Sketching and Calligraphy in the Commercial School and the Girls' School of Volos. Poulakas established his studio in an alley in the port section of Volos and exhibited his work at a central store; soon after he started to give private painting lessons. He created seascapes (mainly views of the port and the Volos seashore), landscapes, portraits, scenography and icons, as well as teaching. His landscapes displayed Pelion, Karditsa, Itea and Galaxidi and his seascapes included the islands of Crete, Skopelos, Chios and Corfu. Son George was killed in battle in 1918 in World War I.

Several important painters had their first lessons from Poulakas, including Konstantinos Zimeris (1886–1982) and Aristomenes Angelopoulos (1900–1990).

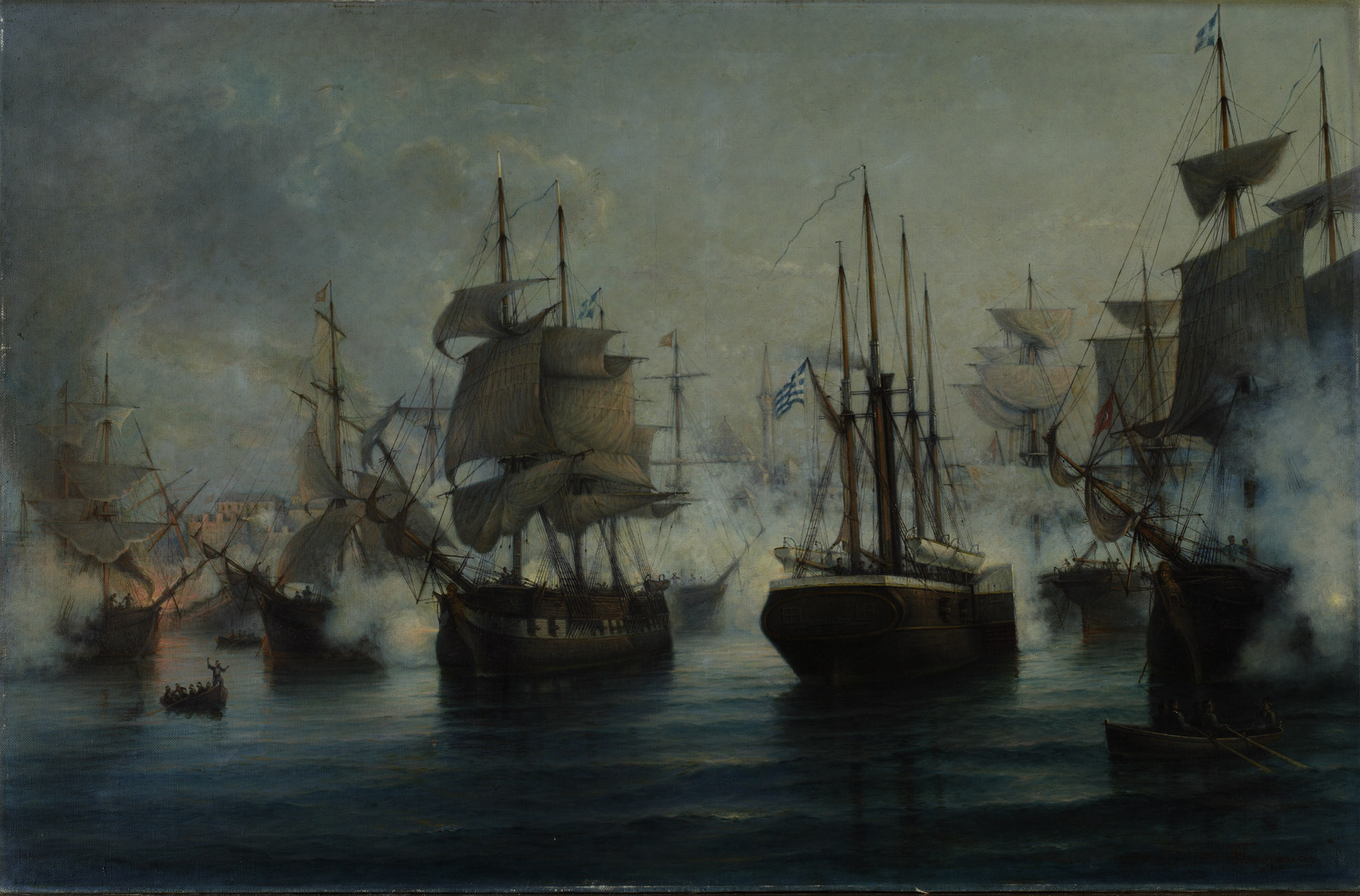
Sea Battle of Itea

Notable works of this period include Port of Chios (Commercial Bank of Greece), The Sea Battle of Itea (Bank of Greece), Portrait of Ioannis Kartalis (Municipal Art Gallery of Volos), Dockside of Volos (Katsigras), Port of Galaxidi, Fishing on seashore near Port of Volos and Sailing Scooner. In 1920 he produced The Sea Battle of Volos 1827, (Volos Municipal Art Gallery).

He worked on icons from 1901 on in Magnesia, Thessaly and Sterea Hellas, as well as in Karditsa, Galaxidi and Itea. Saints Constantine and Helen, (1911) is at the temple of the Metropolitan Church of Karditsa. Saint George adorns the outer northern lintel at his hometown church. The flight into Egypt (1922) is at the Church of St. John in Upper Gatzea of Volos. Adoration of the Magi (1923) is at the Church of Saint Athanasius in Lehonia of Volos. The Exaltation of the Holy Cross and Bridegroom Christ are at the Cathedral of St Nicholas in Galaxidi. the earthquake of 1955 destroyed the Church of the Ascension of Christ in Volos along with his icon and woodcarving.

From 1901 to 1924 he worked as a scenographer in Volos, Karditsa, Larissa and other cities of Thessaly. Only a few notes and family testimonies survive, describing: Merope, a drama by Dimitrios Vernardakis, and When the wife is beautiful, a comedy with a performance by Pantopoulos, presented in the Municipal Theatre of Volos in 1908, as well as Shakespeare's "A Midsummer Night's Dream" performed by the company of Vassilia Stefanou and the revue, Panorama of Volos in the Theater Polytheama in 1910 and 1911, respectively.

=== Athens 1924–1942 ===
In 1924 Poulakas went to Athens to care for his dying son, Konstantinos, who suffered from tuberculosis. This loss led him to move to Athens, where he taught sketching and painting in public high schools and cultural centers and was a visiting instructor in the School of Fine Arts. His studio was on Glafcou Street near the First Cemetery of Athens, then on Zacharitsa Street in the Veikou district, and finally on Shehou Street in the Kalliroi district. From 1930 until 1932 he taught in the Commercial School at Hermoupolis on the island of Syros.

He generally avoided new approaches to painting to protect his income. Nonetheless, impressionism is evident in some of his published works, such as Attica Shore (1894) and Panormos Seashore in Scopelos (P. Moraitis).

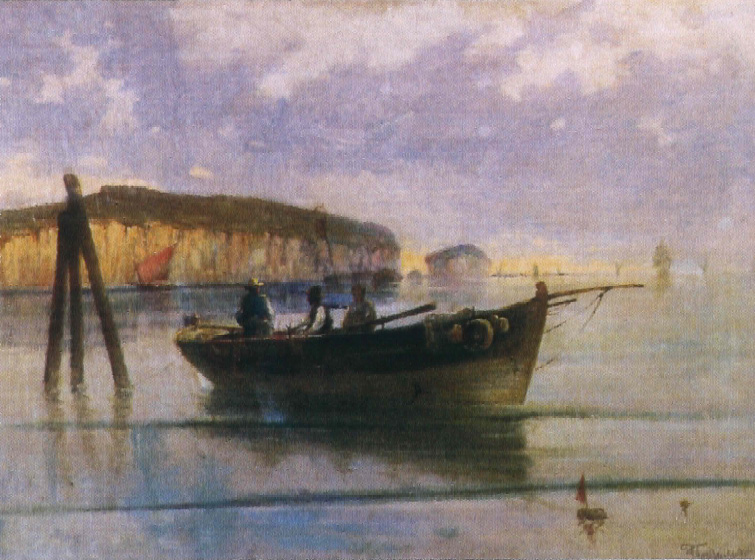
Ioannis Poulakas, Sea painting with boat, oil on canvas, 1935.

Between 1924 and his death he painted seascapes and landscapes and views of sites in Athens. Works include the heroic sailing ship Leonidas that fought in the Greek War of Independence (Leventis), Fishing Boat on Seashore (Museum A. K. Damtsa, Art Center Giorgio de Chirico, Volos) and Brig and Steamer, which appeared on a Greek postage stamp in 1969. Also in this period he painted the old training sailing ship of the Royal Hellenic Navy, Aris and Acropolis, a view of the Parthenon from the vicinity of the Temple of Olympian Zeus. Poulakas icons appear in the chapel of the Panaghia Spiliotissa on the Acropolis of Athens.

In 1930 he left to teach in the Commercial School of Syros. In that period he very likely worked in the theatre of "Apollo" in Hermoupolis.

In 1932, he retired to Athens in the middle of an economic crisis that shrank the art market. Poulakas painted pennons, flags and banners and posters for cinema shows.

For several years respect for his work was confined to narrow artistic circles. Particularly in the immediate postwar years, historical works were filled with confusing information about both his life and work. Art historian and folklorist Fotis Voyatzis brought new attention to his work. Art historians and critics such as Manolis Vlachos, Nelly Missirlis, Manos Stefanidis and others include Poulakas in the small coterie of Greek sea-painters who made a special contribution to the transitional stylistic period of New Hellenic Painting between 19th and 20th century.
