= List of extreme points of Croatia =

The geographical extreme points of Croatia are

- Northernmost point:
  - Žabnik (administratively part of Sveti Martin na Muri, Međimurje County) - 46°33′18″N 16°22′08″E
- Southernmost point:
  - Islet Galijula in the Adriatic Sea (administratively part of Komiža on the island of Vis, Split-Dalmatia County) - 42°22′40″N 16°20′19″E
  - On the mainland: Vitaljina, Cape Oštra (rt Oštra) on the Prevlaka peninsula (administratively part of Cavtat, Dubrovnik-Neretva County) - 42°23′32″N 18°31′52″E
- Easternmost point:
  - Rađevac (administratively part of Ilok, Vukovar-Syrmia County) - 45°11′45″N 19°26′50″E
- Westernmost point:
  - Bašanija, Cape Lako (rt Lako) (administratively part of Umag, Istria County) - 45°29′13″N 13°29′30″E

== Altitude ==
- Highest point : Dinara, 1,831 m (6,007 ft)
- Lowest point : Adriatic Sea, 0 m

== See also ==
- Geography of Croatia

== Sources ==
- Ostroški, Ljiljana, ed. (December 2015). Statistički ljetopis Republike Hrvatske 2015 [Statistical Yearbook of the Republic of Croatia 2015] (PDF). Statistical Yearbook of the Republic of Croatia (in Croatian and English). Vol. 47. Zagreb: Croatian Bureau of Statistics. ISSN 1333-3305.
