= Geography of Croatia =

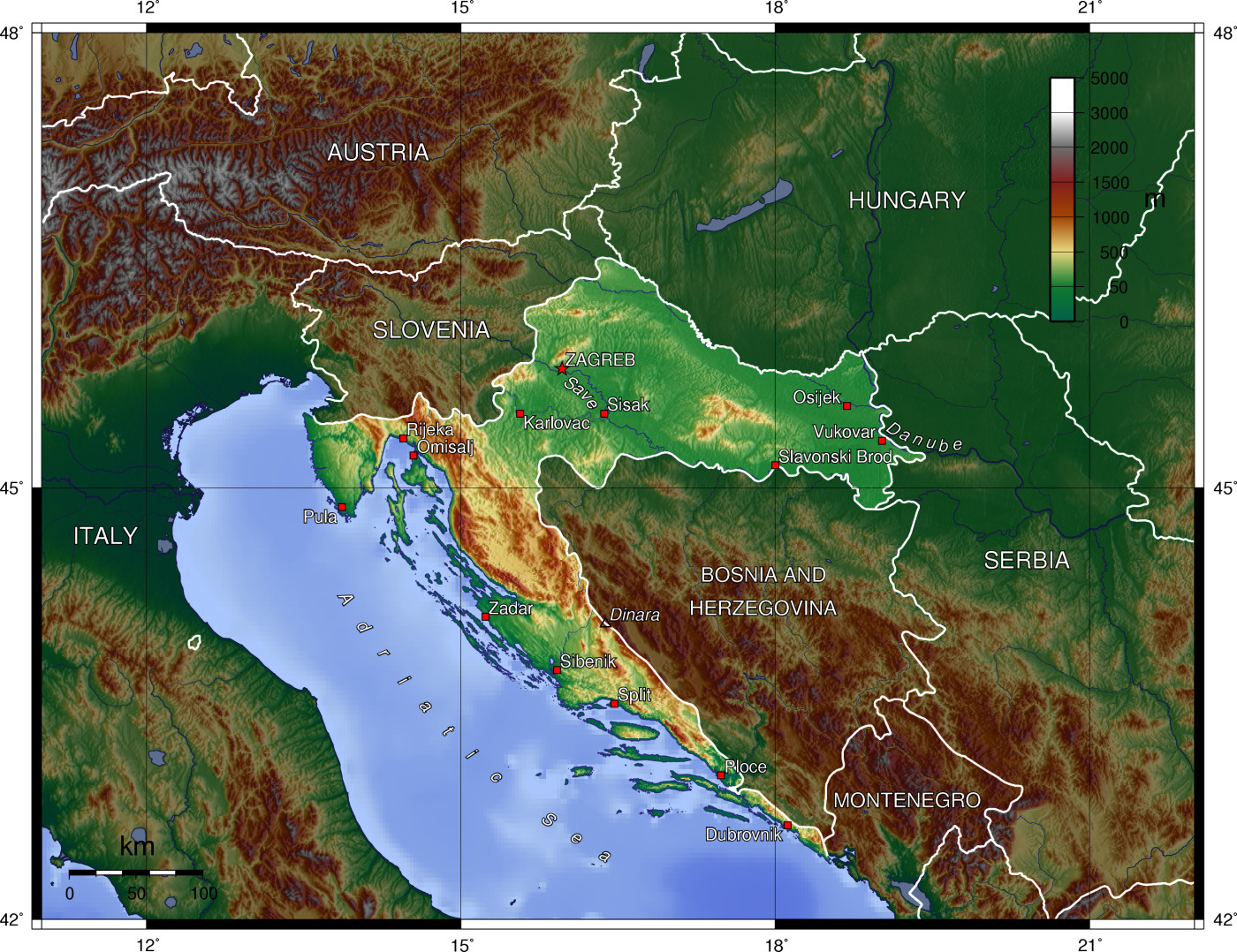
- Continent: Europe
- Region: Central Europe
- Coordinates: 45°8′30″N 16°13′45″E
- Area: Ranked 127th
  - Total: 56,594 km^{2} (21,851 sq mi)
  - Land: 99%
  - Water: 1%
- Coastline: 5,835.1 km (3,625.8 mi)
- Borders: 2,237 km (1,390 mi)
- Highest point: Dinara; 1,831 m (6,007 ft)
- Lowest point: Adriatic Sea (sea level)
- Longest river: Sava; 562 km (349 mi)
- Largest lake: Lake Vrana; 30.7 km^{2} (11.9 sq mi)

The geography of Croatia is defined by its location at the crossroads of Central Europe and Southeast Europe, and the wider region of Southern Europe. Croatia's territory covers 56,594 km^{2} (21,851 sq mi), making it the 127th largest country in the world. Bordered by Slovenia in the northwest, Hungary in the northeast, Bosnia and Herzegovina in the south and southeast, Serbia in the east, Montenegro in the southeast and the Adriatic Sea in the south, it lies mostly between latitudes 42° and 47° N and longitudes 13° and 20° E. Croatian territorial waters encompass 18,981 square kilometres (7,329 sq mi) in a 12 nautical miles (22 km; 14 mi) wide zone, and its internal waters located within the baseline cover an additional 12,498 square kilometres (4,826 sq mi).

The Pannonian Plain and the Dinaric Alps, along with the Adriatic Basin, represent major geomorphological parts of Croatia. Lowlands make up the bulk of Croatia, with elevations of less than 200 metres (660 ft) above sea level recorded in 53.42% of the country. Most of the lowlands are found in the northern regions, especially in Slavonia, itself a part of the Pannonian Basin plain. The plains are interspersed with horst and graben structures, believed to have broken the Pliocene Pannonian Sea's surface as islands. The greatest concentration of ground at relatively high elevations is found in the Lika and Gorski Kotar areas in the Dinaric Alps, but high areas are found in all regions of Croatia to some extent. The Dinaric Alps contain the highest mountain in Croatia—1,831-metre (6,007 ft) Dinara—as well as all other mountains in Croatia higher than 1,500 metres (4,900 ft). Croatia's Adriatic Sea mainland coast is 1,777.3 kilometres (1,104.4 mi) long, while its 1,246 islands and islets encompass a further 4,058 kilometres (2,522 mi) of coastline—the most indented coastline in the Mediterranean. Karst topography makes up about half of Croatia and is especially prominent in the Dinaric Alps, as well as throughout the coastal areas and the islands.

62% of Croatia's territory is encompassed by the Adriatic Sea. The area includes the largest rivers flowing in the country: the Danube, Sava, Drava, Mur and Kupa. The remainder belongs to the Adriatic Sea drainage basin, where the largest river by far is the Neretva. Most of Croatia has a moderately warm and rainy continental climate as defined by the Köppen climate classification. The mean monthly temperature ranges between −3 °C (27 °F) and 18 °C (64 °F). Croatia has a number of ecoregions because of its climate and geomorphology, and the country is consequently among the most biodiverse in Europe. There are four types of biogeographical regions in Croatia: Mediterranean along the coast and in its immediate hinterland; Alpine in the elevated Lika and Gorski Kotar; Pannonian along the Drava and Danube; and Continental in the remaining areas. There are 444 protected natural areas in Croatia, encompassing 8.5% of the country; there are about 37,000 known species in Croatia, and the total number of species is estimated to be between 50,000 and 100,000.

The permanent population of Croatia by the 2011 census reached 4.29 million. The population density was 75.8 inhabitants per square kilometre, and the overall life expectancy in Croatia at birth was 75.7 years. The country is inhabited mostly by Croats (89.6%), while minorities include Serbs (4.5%), and 21 other ethnicities (less than 1% each) recognised by the constitution. Since the counties were re-established in 1992, Croatia is divided into 20 counties and the capital city of Zagreb. The counties subdivide into 127 cities and 429 municipalities. The average urbanisation rate in Croatia stands at 56%, with a growing urban population and shrinking rural population. The largest city and the nation's capital is Zagreb, with an urban population of 797,952 in the city itself and a metropolitan area population of 978,161. The populations of Split and Rijeka exceed 100,000, and five more cities in Croatia have populations over 50,000.

== Area and borders ==
Croatia's territory covers 56,594 square kilometres (21,851 square miles), making it the 127th largest country in the world. The physical geography of Croatia is defined by its location—it is described as a part of Southeast Europe. Croatia borders Bosnia–Herzegovina (for 1,009.1 km) in the south and southeast, Slovenia for 667.8 km in the northwest, in the east, Hungary for 355.5 km in the north, Serbia (for 317.6 km) in the east, Montenegro (for 22.6 km) in the southeast and the Adriatic Sea in the west, south and southwest. It lies mostly between latitudes 42° and 47° N and longitudes 13° and 20° E. Part of the extreme south of Croatia is separated from the rest of the mainland by a short coastline strip around Neum belonging to Bosnia–Herzegovina. The country's shape is described as a 'horseshoe' (potkova), and it arose as a result of medieval geopolitics.

Croatia has 348-kilometre (216 mi) border with Hungary. Much of it follows the Drava River or its former river bed; that part of the border dates from the Middle Ages. The border in Međimurje and Baranya was defined as a border between the Kingdom of Hungary and the Kingdom of Serbs, Croats, and Slovenes, later renamed the Kingdom of Yugoslavia, pursuant to the Treaty of Trianon of 1920. The present outline of the 956-kilometre (594 mi) border with Bosnia–Herzegovina and 19-kilometre (12 mi) border with Montenegro is largely the result of the Ottoman conquest and subsequent recapture of territories in the Great Turkish War of 1667–1698 formally ending with the Treaty of Karlowitz, as well as the Fifth and Seventh Ottoman–Venetian Wars. This border had minor modifications in 1947 when all borders of the former Yugoslav constituent republics were defined by demarcation commissions implementing the AVNOJ decisions of 1943 and 1945 regarding the federal organisation of Yugoslavia. The commissions also defined Baranya and Međimurje as Croatian territories, and moreover set up the present-day 314-kilometre (195 mi) border between Serbia and Croatia in Syrmia and along the Danube River between Ilok and the Drava river's mouth and further north to the Hungarian border; the Ilok/Drava section matched the border between the Kingdom of Croatia-Slavonia and Bács-Bodrog County that existed until 1918 (the end of World War I). Most of the 600-kilometre (370 mi) border with Slovenia was also defined by the commissions, matching the northwestern border of the Kingdom of Croatia-Slavonia, and establishing a new section of Croatian border north of the Istrian peninsula according to the ethnic composition of the territory previously belonging to the Kingdom of Italy.

Pursuant to the 1947 Treaty of Peace with Italy the islands of Cres, Lastovo and Palagruža and the cities of Zadar and Rijeka and most of Istria went to communist Yugoslavia and Croatia, while carving out the Free Territory of Trieste (FTT) as a city-state. The FTT was partitioned in 1954 as Trieste itself and the area to the north of it were placed under Italian control, and the rest under Yugoslav control. The arrangement was made permanent by the Treaty of Osimo in 1975. The former FTT's Yugoslav part was partitioned between Croatia and Slovenia, largely conforming to the area population's ethnic composition.

In the late 19th century, Austria-Hungary established a geodetic network, for which the elevation benchmark was determined by the Adriatic Sea's average level at the Sartorio pier in Trieste. This benchmark was subsequently retained by Austria, adopted by Yugoslavia, and kept by the states that emerged after its dissolution, including Croatia.

Length of land borders of Croatia (including rivers)
Country	Length
Slovenia	670 km (420 mi)
Hungary	348 km (216 mi)
Serbia	314 km (195 mi)
Bosnia–Herzegovina	956 km (594 mi)
Montenegro	19 km (12 mi)
Total	2,237 km (1,390 mi)

=== Extreme points ===
The geographical extreme points of Croatia are Žabnik in Međimurje County as the northernmost point, Rađevac near Ilok in Vukovar-Syrmia County as the easternmost point, Cape Lako near Bašanija in Istria County as the westernmost point and the islet of Galijula in Palagruža archipelago in Split-Dalmatia County as the southernmost point. On the mainland, Cape Oštra of the Prevlaka peninsula in Dubrovnik-Neretva County is the southernmost point.

Extreme points of Croatia
Point	Name	Part of	County	Note
Northernmost	Žabnik	Sveti Martin na Muri	Međimurje	46°33′N 16°22′E
Southernmost*	Galijula	Palagruža archipelago	Split-Dalmatia	42°23′N 16°21′E
Southernmost*	Cape Oštra	Prevlaka peninsula	Dubrovnik-Neretva	42°24′N 18°32′E
Easternmost	Rađevac	Ilok	Vukovar-Syrmia	45°12′N 19°27′E
Westernmost	Cape Lako	Umag	Istria	45°29′N 13°30′E
Highest	Dinara peak	Dinara	Šibenik-Knin	1,831 m (6,007 ft) above sea level, 44°3′N 16°23′E
Lowest	Adriatic Sea	Mediterranean Sea	—N/a	sea level, 43°N 15°E
*Cape Oštra is the southernmost point of the mainland, while Galijula is the southernmost point of Croatian territory.

=== Maritime claims ===
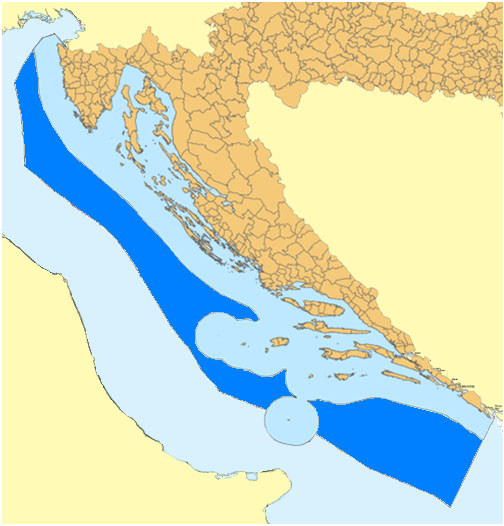
Croatian Ecological and Fisheries Protection Zone of the Adriatic Sea

Italy and Yugoslavia defined their delineation of the continental shelf in the Adriatic Sea in 1968, with an additional agreement on the boundary in the Gulf of Trieste signed in 1975 in accordance with the Treaty of Osimo. All the successor states of former Yugoslavia accepted the agreements. Prior to Yugoslavia's break-up, Albania, Italy and Yugoslavia initially proclaimed 15-nautical-mile (28 km; 17 mi) territorial waters, subsequently reduced to the international-standard 12 nautical miles (22 km; 14 mi); all sides adopted baseline systems. Croatia also declared its Ecological and Fisheries Protection Zone (ZERP)—a part of its Exclusive Economic Zone—as extending to the continental shelf boundary. Croatia's territorial waters encompass 18,981 square kilometres (7,329 sq mi); its internal waters located within the baseline cover an additional 12,498 square kilometres (4,826 sq mi).

=== Border disputes ===
==== Maritime border disputes ====
Croatia and Slovenia started negotiations to define maritime borders in the Gulf of Piran in 1992 but failed to agree, resulting in a dispute. Both countries also declared their economic zones, which partially overlap. Croatia's application to become an EU member state was initially suspended pending resolution of its border disputes with Slovenia. These were eventually settled with an agreement to accept the decision of an international arbitration commission set up via the UN, enabling Croatia to progress towards EU membership. The dispute has caused no major practical problems in areas other than the EU membership negotiations progress, even before the arbitration agreement.

The maritime boundary between Bosnia–Herzegovina and Croatia was formally settled in 1999, but a few issues are still contested—the Klek peninsula and two islets in the border area. The Croatia–Montenegro maritime boundary is disputed in the Bay of Kotor, at the Prevlaka peninsula. The situation was exacerbated by the peninsula's occupation by the Yugoslav People's Army and later by the Serbian-Montenegrin army, which in turn was replaced by a United Nations observer mission that lasted until 2002. Croatia took over the area with an agreement that allowed Montenegrin presence in Croatian waters in the bay, and the dispute has become far less contentious since the independence of Montenegro in 2006.

==== Land border disputes ====
The land border disputes pertain to comparatively small strips of land. The Croatia–Slovenia border disputes are: along the Dragonja River's lower course where Slovenia claims three hamlets on the river's left bank; the Sveta Gera peak of Žumberak where exact territorial claims were never made and appear to be limited to a military barracks on the peak itself; and along the Mura River where Slovenia wants the border to be along the current river bed instead of along a former one and claims a (largely if not completely uninhabited) piece of land near Hotiza. These claims are likewise in the process of being settled by binding arbitration.

There are also land border disputes between Croatia and Serbia. The two countries presently control one bank of the present-day river each, but Croatia claims that the border line should follow the cadastral borders between the former municipalities of SR Croatia and SR Serbia along the Danube, as defined by a Yugoslav commission in 1947 (effectively following a former river bed); borders claimed by Croatia also include the Vukovar and Šarengrad islands in the Danube as its territory. There is also a border dispute with Bosnia–Herzegovina, specifically Croatia claims Unčica channel on the right bank of Una as the border at Hrvatska Kostajnica, while Bosnia and Herzegovina claims Una River course as the border there.

== Physical geography ==
=== Geology ===
The geology of Croatia has some Precambrian rocks mostly covered by younger sedimentary rocks and deformed or superimposed by tectonic activity. The country is split into two main onshore provinces, a smaller part of the Pannonian Basin and the Karst Region in the Dinarides. The carbonate platform karst landscape of Croatia helped to create the weathering conditions to form bauxite, gypsum, clay, amphibolite, granite, spilite, gabbro, diabase and limestone.

=== Topography ===
Most of Croatia is lowlands, with elevations of less than 200 metres (660 ft) above sea level recorded in 53.42% of the country. Most of the lowlands are found in the country's northern regions, especially in Slavonia, representing a part of the Pannonian Basin. Areas with elevations of 200 to 500 metres (660 to 1,640 ft) above sea level encompass 25.61% of Croatia's territory, and the areas between 500 and 1,000 metres (1,600 and 3,300 ft) above sea level cover 17.11% of the country. A further 3.71% of the land is 1,000 to 1,500 metres (3,300 to 4,900 ft) above sea level, and only 0.15% of Croatia's territory is elevated greater than 1,500 metres (4,900 ft) above sea level. The greatest concentration of ground at relatively high elevations is found in the Lika and Gorski Kotar areas in the Dinaric Alps, but such areas are found in all regions of Croatia to some extent. The Pannonian Basin and the Dinaric Alps, along with the Adriatic Basin, represent major geomorphological parts of Croatia.

==== Adriatic Basin ====
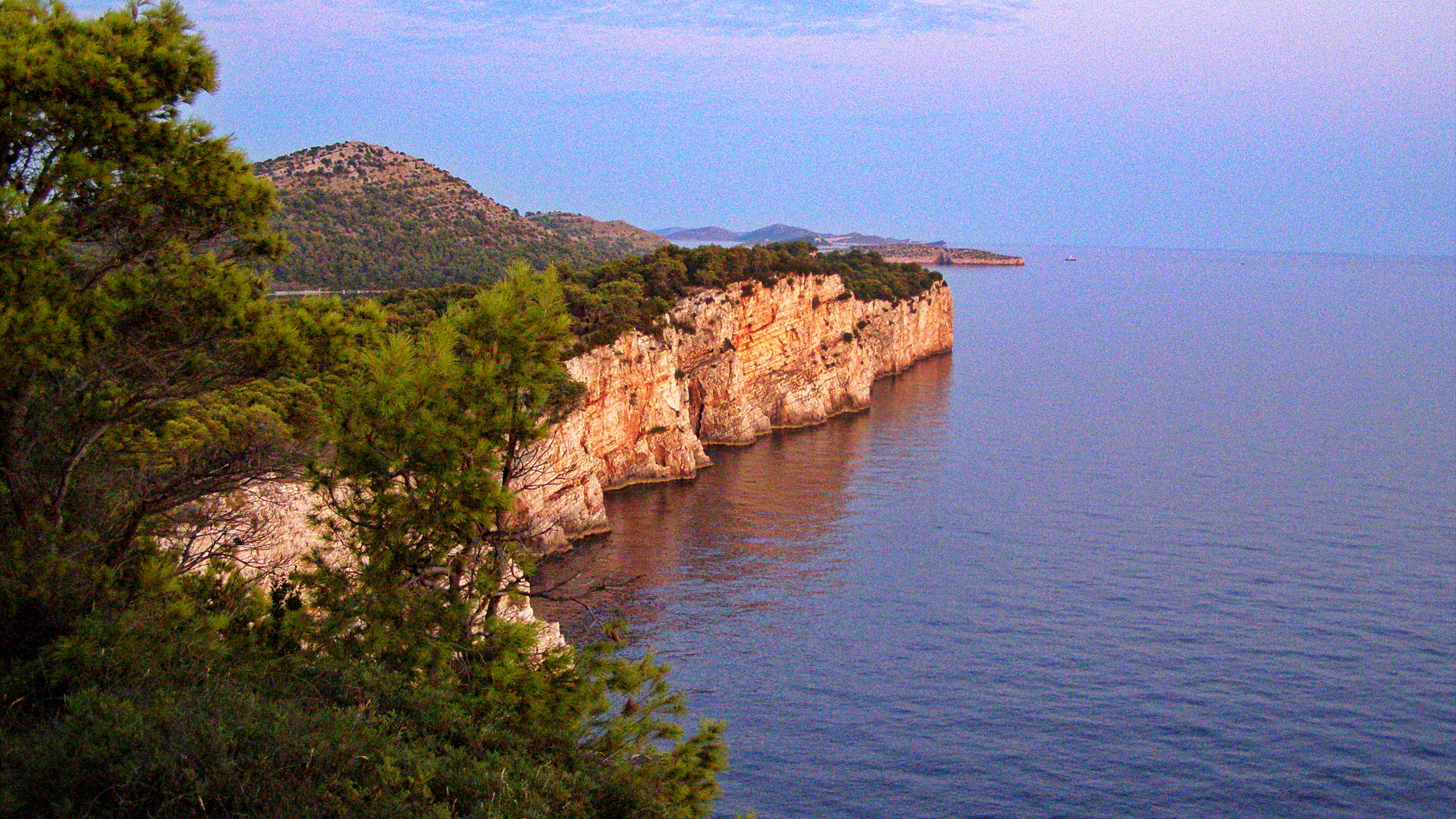
Kornati National Park

Croatia's Adriatic Sea mainland coast is 1,777.3 kilometres (1,104.4 mi) long, while its 1,246 islands and islets have a further 4,058 kilometres (2,522 mi) of coastline. The distance between the extreme points of Croatia's coastline is 526 kilometres (327 mi). The number of islands includes all islands, islets, and rocks of all sizes, including ones emerging only at low tide. The largest islands in the Adriatic are Cres and Krk, each covering 405.78 square kilometres (156.67 sq mi); the tallest is Brač, reaching 780 metres (2,560 ft) above sea level. The islands include 47 permanently inhabited ones, the most populous among them being Krk and Korčula.

The shore is the most indented coastline in the Mediterranean. The majority of the coast is characterised by a karst topography, developed from the Adriatic Carbonate Platform. Karstification there largely began after the final raising of the Dinarides in the Oligocene and Miocene epochs, when carbonate rock was exposed to atmospheric effects such as rain; this extended to 120 metres (390 ft) below the present sea level, exposed during the Last Glacial Maximum's sea level drop. It is estimated that some karst formations are related to earlier drops of sea level, most notably the Messinian salinity crisis. The eastern coast's largest part consists of carbonate rocks, while flysch rock is significantly represented in the Gulf of Trieste coast, on the Kvarner Gulf coast opposite Krk, and in Dalmatia north of Split. There are comparably small alluvial areas of the Adriatic coast in Croatia—most notably the Neretva river delta. Western Istria is gradually subsiding, having sunk about 1.5 metres (4 ft 11 in) in the past 2,000 years.

In the Middle Adriatic Basin, there is evidence of Permian volcanism in the area of Komiža on the island of Vis, in addition to the volcanic islands of Jabuka and Brusnik. Earthquakes are frequent in the area around the Adriatic Sea, although most are too faint to be felt; an earthquake doing significant damage happens every few decades, with major earthquakes every few centuries.

==== Dinaric Alps ====
The Dinaric Alps are linked to a Late Jurassic to recent times fold and thrust belt, itself part of the Alpine orogeny, extending southeast from the southern Alps. The Dinaric Alps in Croatia encompass the entire Gorski Kotar and Lika regions, as well as considerable parts of Dalmatia, with their northeastern edge running from 1,181-metre (3,875 ft) Žumberak to the Banovina region, along the Sava River, and their westernmost landforms being 1,272-metre (4,173 ft) Ćićarija and 1,396-metre (4,580 ft) Učka mountains in Istria. The Dinaric Alps contain the highest mountain in Croatia—1,831-metre (6,007 ft) Dinara—as well as all other mountains in Croatia higher than 1,500 metres (4,900 feet): Biokovo, Velebit, Plješivica, Velika Kapela, Risnjak, Svilaja and Snježnik.

Karst topography makes up about half of Croatia and is especially prominent in the Dinaric Alps. There are numerous caves in Croatia, 49 of which are deeper than 250 metres (820.21 ft), 14 deeper than 500 metres (1,640.42 ft) and 3 deeper than 1,000 metres (3,280.84 ft). The longest cave in Croatia, Kita Gaćešina, is at the same time the longest cave in the Dinaric Alps at 20,656 metres (67,769 ft).

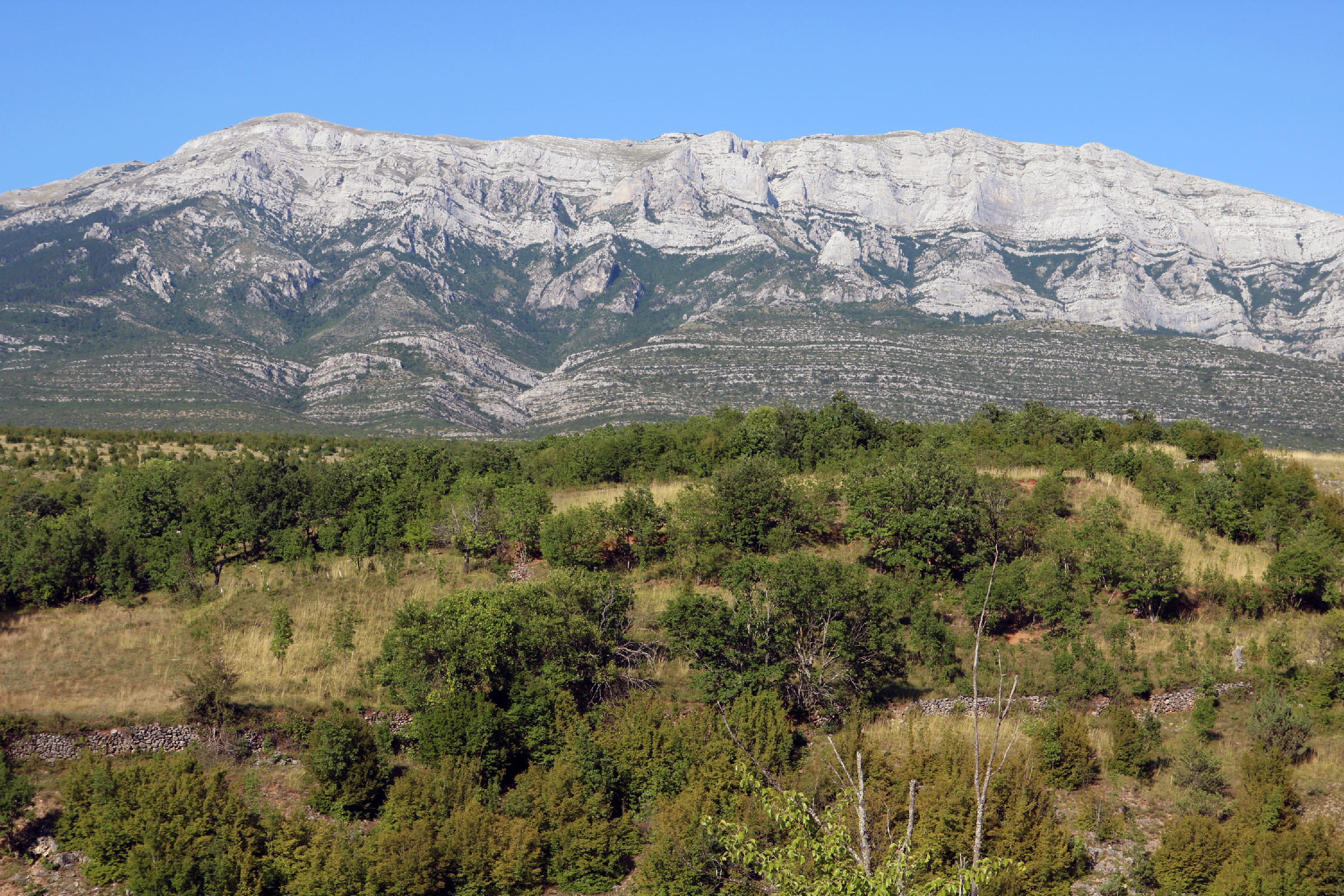
Dinara, highest point of Croatia (1,831 m)

Highest mountain peaks of Croatia
Mountain	Peak	Elevation	Coordinates
Dinara	Dinara	1,831 m (6,007 ft)	44°3′N 16°23′E
Biokovo	Sveti Jure	1,762 m (5,781 ft)	43°20′N 17°03′E
Velebit	Vaganski Peak	1,757 m (5,764 ft)	44°32′N 15°14′E
Plješivica	Ozeblin	1,657 m (5,436 ft)	44°47′N 15°45′E
Velika Kapela	Bjelolasica-Kula	1,533 m (5,030 ft)	45°16′N 14°58′E
Risnjak	Risnjak	1,528 m (5,013 ft)	45°25′N 14°45′E
Svilaja	Svilaja	1,508 m (4,948 ft)	43°49′N 16°27′E
Snježnik	Snježnik	1,506 m (4,941 ft)	45°26′N 14°35′E

==== Pannonian Basin ====
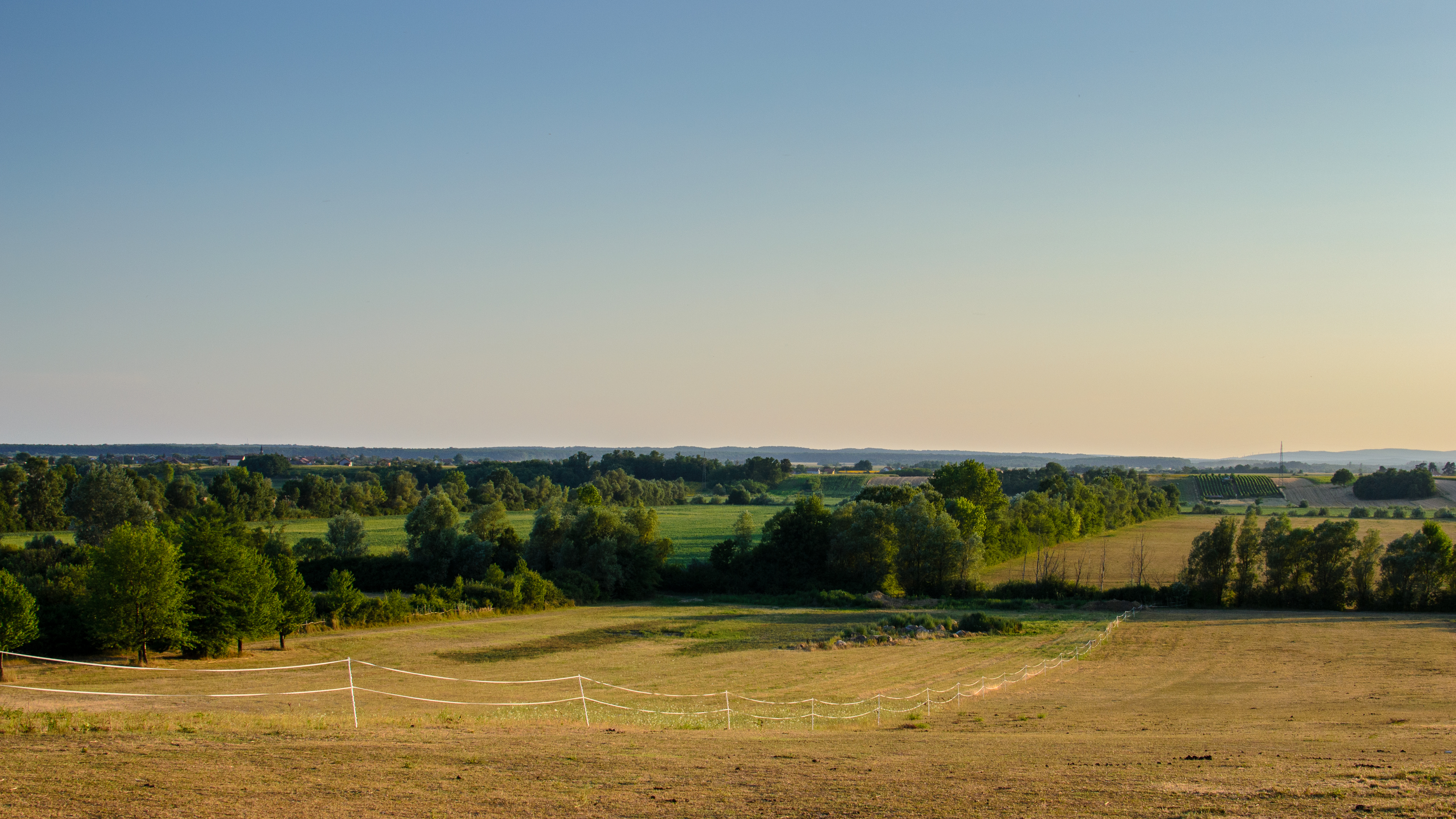
A plain in Slavonia

The Pannonian Basin took shape through Miocenian thinning and subsidence of crust structures formed during the Late Paleozoic Variscan orogeny. The Paleozoic and Mesozoic structures are visible in Papuk and other Slavonian mountains. The processes also led to the formation of a stratovolcanic chain in the basin 12–17 Mya; intensified subsidence was observed until 5 Mya as well as flood basalts at about 7.5 Mya. The contemporary tectonic uplift of the Carpathian Mountains severed water flow to the Black Sea and the Pannonian Sea formed in the basin. Sediments were transported to the basin from the uplifting Carpathian and Dinaric mountains, with particularly deep fluvial sediments being deposited in the Pleistocene epoch during the Transdanubian Mountains' formation. Ultimately, up to 3,000 metres (9,800 ft) of sediment was deposited in the basin, and the sea eventually drained through the Iron Gate gorge.

The results are large plains in the area bound by the rivers of Danube, Sava, Drava, and Kupa (including Slavonia, Baranya, and Syrmia). The plains are interspersed by isolated mountains. The tallest among such landforms are 1,059-metre (3,474 ft) Ivanšćica and 1,035-metre (3,396 ft) Medvednica north of Zagreb—both are also at least partially in Hrvatsko Zagorje—as well as 984-metre (3,228 ft) Psunj and 953-metre (3,127 ft) Papuk that are the tallest among the Slavonian mountains surrounding Požega. Psunj, Papuk and adjacent Krndija consist mostly of Paleozoic rocks from 300 to 350 Mya. Požeška gora, adjacent to Psunj, consists of much more recent Neogene rocks, but there are also Upper Cretaceous sediments and igneous rocks forming the main, 30-kilometre (19 mi) ridge of the hill; these represent the largest igneous landform in Croatia. A smaller piece of igneous terrain is also present on Papuk, near Voćin. The two, as well as the Moslavačka gora mountains, are possibly remnants of a volcanic arc from the same tectonic plate collision that caused the Dinaric Alps.

=== Hydrography ===
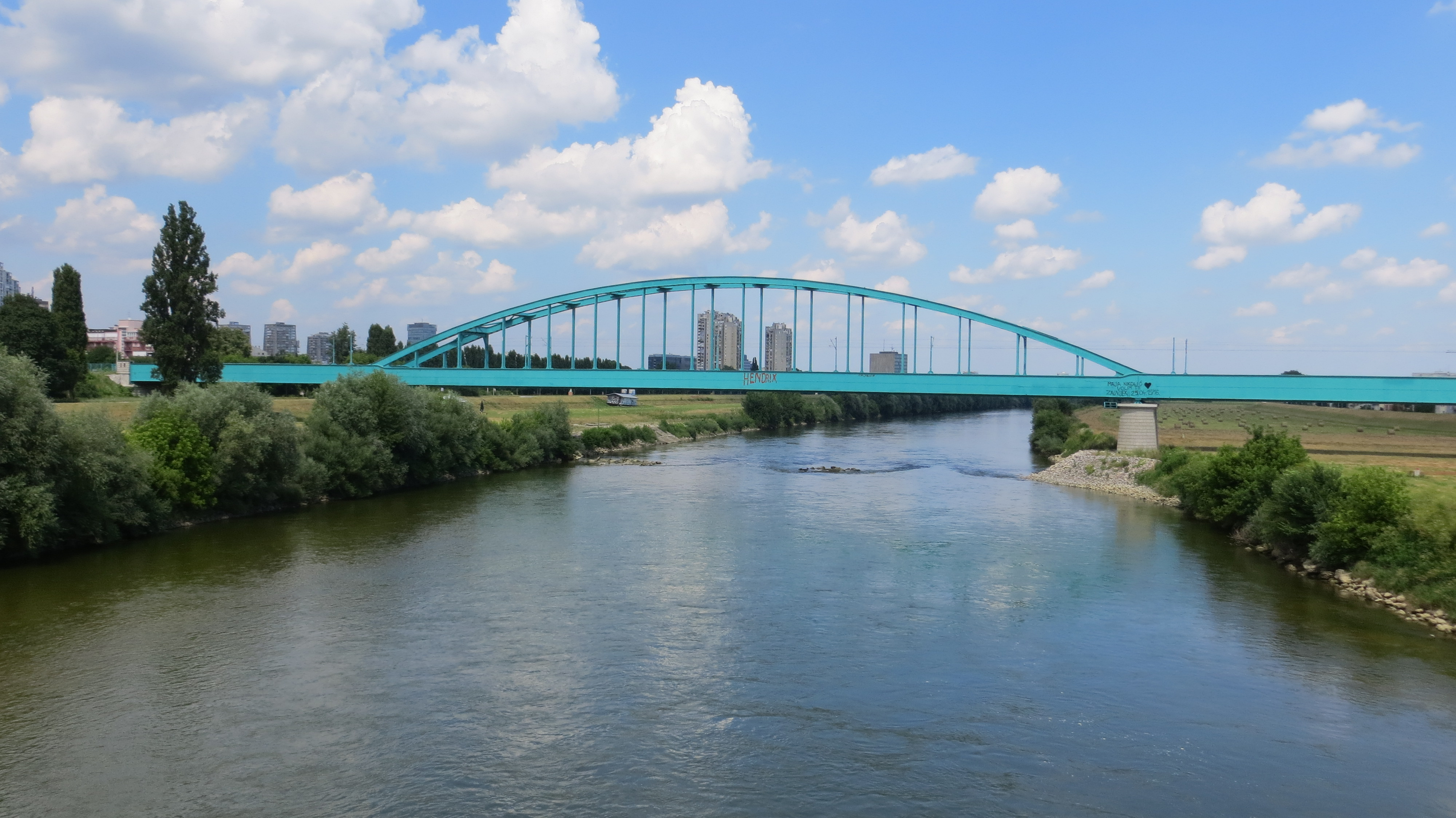
Sava, the longest river in Croatia

The largest part of Croatia—62% of its territory—is encompassed by the Black Sea drainage basin. The area includes the largest rivers flowing in the country: the Danube, Sava, Drava, Mura and Kupa. The rest belongs to the Adriatic Sea drainage basin, where the largest river by far is the Neretva. The longest rivers in Croatia are the 562-kilometre (349 mi) Sava, 505-kilometre (314 mi) Drava, 296-kilometre (184 mi) Kupa and a 188-kilometre (117 mi) section of the Danube. The longest rivers emptying into the Adriatic Sea are the 101-kilometre (63 mi) Cetina and an only 20-kilometre (12 mi) section of the Neretva.

The largest lakes in Croatia are 30.7-square-kilometre (11.9 sq mi) Lake Vrana located in the northern Dalmatia, 17.1-square-kilometre (6.6 sq mi) Lake Dubrava near Varaždin, 13.0-square-kilometre (5.0 sq mi) Peruća Lake (reservoir) on the Cetina River, 11.1-square-kilometre (4.3 sq mi) Lake Prokljan near Skradin and 10.1-square-kilometre (3.9 sq mi) Lake Varaždin reservoir through which the Drava River flows near Varaždin. Croatia's most famous lakes are the Plitvice lakes, a system of 16 lakes with waterfalls connecting them over dolomite and limestone cascades. The lakes are renowned for their distinctive colours, ranging from turquoise to mint green, grey or blue. Croatia has a remarkable wealth in terms of wetlands. Four of those are included in the Ramsar list of internationally important wetlands: Lonjsko Polje along the Sava and Lonja rivers near Sisak, Kopački Rit at the confluence of the Drava and Danube, the Neretva Delta and Crna Mlaka near Jastrebarsko.

Average annual precipitation and evaporation rates are 1,162 millimetres (45.7 in) and 700 millimetres (28 in), respectively. Taking into consideration the overall water balance, the total Croatian water resources amount to 25,163 cubic metres (888,600 cu ft) per year per capita, including 5,877 cubic metres (207,500 cu ft) per year per capita from sources inside Croatia.

=== Climate ===
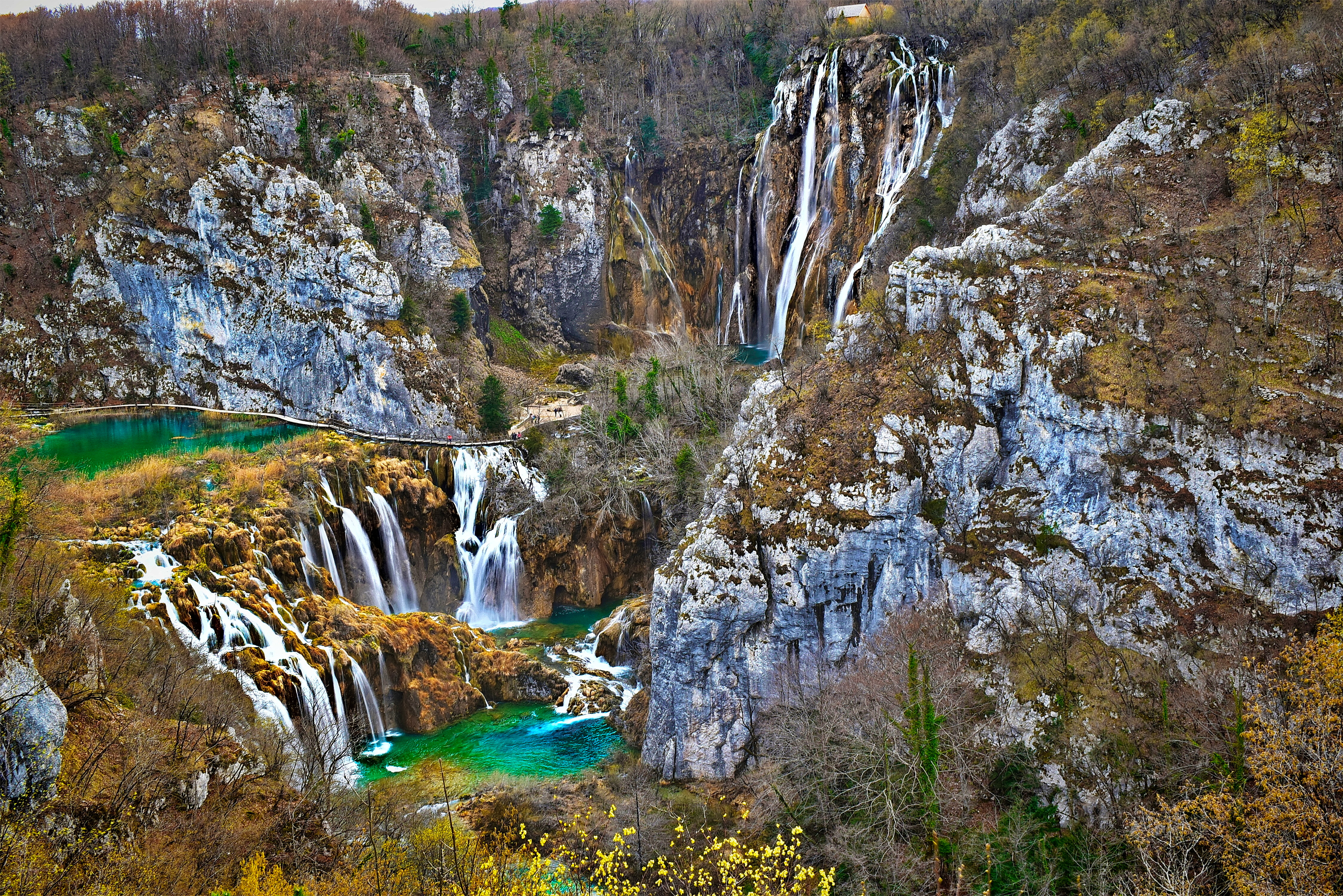
Plitvice Lakes National Park, a UNESCO World Heritage Site

Köppen climate types of Croatia

Most of Croatia has a moderately warm and rainy subtropical highland climate (Cfb) as defined by the Köppen climate classification. The northern Adriatic coast and islands, as well as the Dalmatian coast's hinterland are characterised by the warm temperate climate (Cfa) climate and most of the central and southern Adriatic coast and islands have the Mediterranean climate (mostly Csb) climate. The highest elevations are characterised by the Df climate.

Mean monthly temperatures range between −3 °C (27 °F) and 18 °C (64 °F) in the coldest month (January) except in the coldest parts of the country are Lika and Gorski Kotar at elevations above 1,200 metres (3,900 ft) where that metric is lower. Temperature peaks are more pronounced in the continental areas: the lowest temperature of −35.5 °C (−31.9 °F) was recorded on 3 February 1919 in Čakovec, and the highest temperature of 42.4 °C (108.3 °F) was recorded on 5 July 1950 in Karlovac.

The mean annual precipitation is 600 to 3,500 millimetres (24 to 138 in) depending on the geographic region and prevailing climate type. The least precipitation is recorded in the outer islands (Vis, Lastovo, Biševo, and Svetac) and in the eastern parts of Slavonia; however, in the latter case the precipitation mostly occurs during the growing season. The prevailing winds in the interior are light to moderate northeast or southwest. Higher wind velocities are more often recorded in cooler months along the coast, generally as cool northeasterly bora (sometimes exceeding 50 metres per second (160 ft/s) and southerly sirocco. The sunniest parts of the country are the outer islands, Hvar and Korčula, where more than 2,700 hours of sunshine are recorded per year, followed by the southern Adriatic Sea area in general, northern Adriatic coast, and Slavonia, all with more than 2,000 hours of sunshine per year.

Climate characteristics in major cities in Croatia
City	Mean temperature (daily high)				Mean total rainfall					
City	January		July		January			July		
City	°C	°F	°C	°F	mm	in	days	mm	in	days
Dubrovnik	12.2	54.0	28.3	82.9	95.2	3.75	11.2	24.1	0.95	4.4
Osijek	2.6	36.7	28.0	82.4	45.5	1.79	12.2	60.8	2.39	10.2
Rijeka	8.7	47.7	27.7	81.9	134.9	5.31	11.0	82.0	3.23	9.1
Split	10.2	50.4	29.8	85.6	77.9	3.07	11.1	27.6	1.09	5.6
Zagreb	3.1	37.6	26.7	80.1	48.6	1.91	10.8	81.0	3.19	10.9
Source:World Meteorological Organization

==== Climate change ====
Croatia aims to reduce CO_{2} emissions by 45% by 2030 and phase out coal by 2033. However, the shift to a low-carbon economy will necessitate significant expenditures in new energy infrastructure and additional renewable energy resources.

Croatia established a 2030 National Energy and Climate Plan to attain its aim. The national policy targets for a 36.4% renewable energy share by 2030, as well as major investment in the energy industry, including hydropower, wind farms, solar photovoltaic facilities, and hydrogen energy.

=== Biodiversity ===
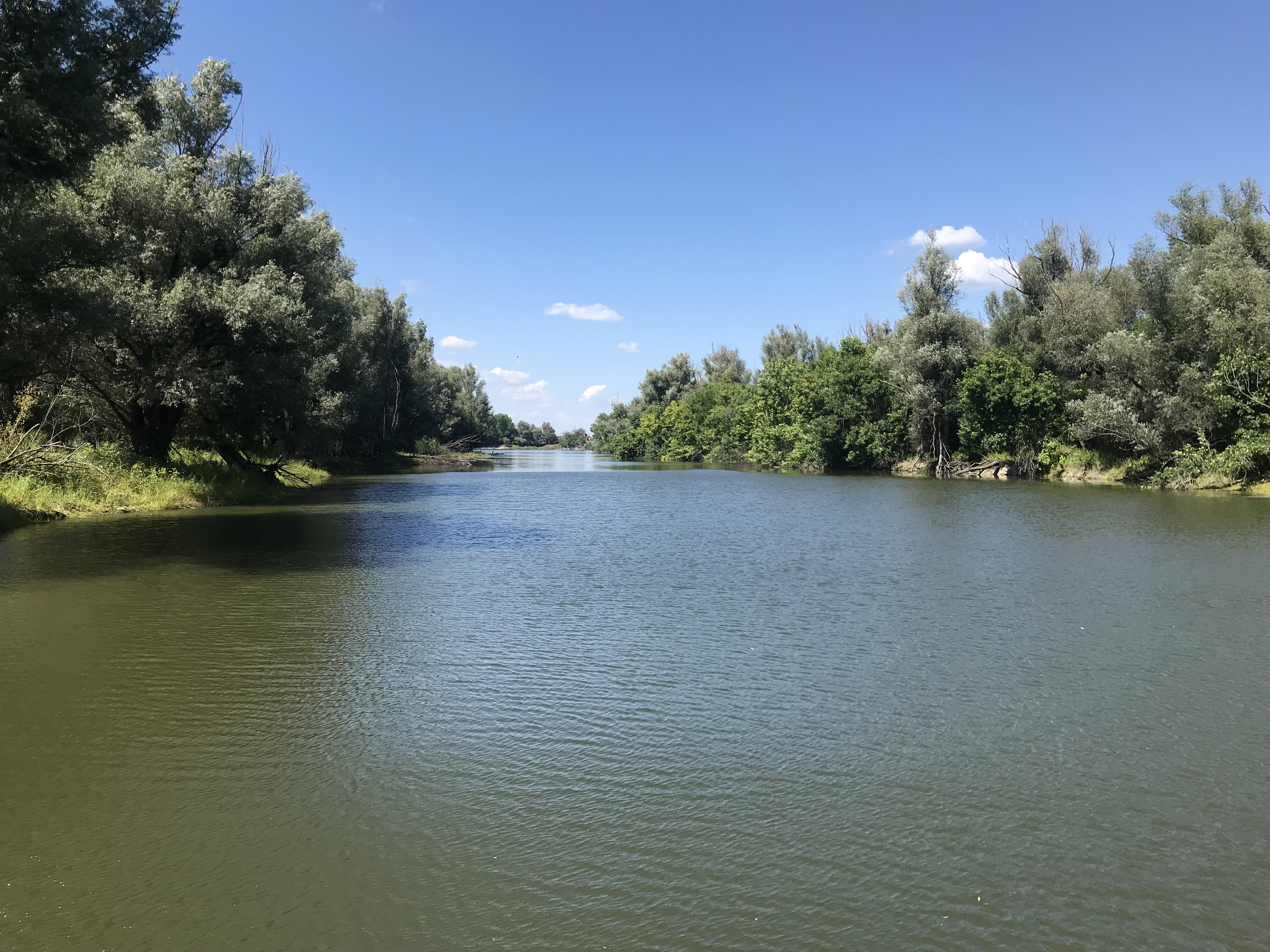
Kopački Rit nature park, one of the largest wetlands in Europe

Croatia can be subdivided between a number of ecoregions because of its climate and geomorphology, and the country is consequently one of the richest in Europe in terms of biodiversity. There are four types of biogeographical regions in Croatia: Mediterranean along the coast and in its immediate hinterland, Alpine in most of Lika and Gorski Kotar, Pannonian along the Drava and Danube, and continental in the remaining areas. Among the most significant are karst habitats; these include submerged karst, such as Zrmanja and Krka canyons and tufa barriers, as well as underground habitats. The karst geology has produced approximately 7,000 caves and pits, many of which are inhabited by troglobitic (exclusively cave-dwelling) animals such as the olm, a cave salamander and the only European troglobitic vertebrate. Forests are also significant in the country, as they cover 26,487.6 square kilometres (10,226.9 sq mi) representing 46.8% of Croatia's land surface. The other habitat types include wetlands, grasslands, bogs, fens, scrub habitats, coastal and marine habitats. In terms of phytogeography, Croatia is part of the Boreal Kingdom; specifically, it is part of the Illyrian and Central European provinces of the Circumboreal Region and the Adriatic province of the Mediterranean Region. The World Wide Fund for Nature divides land in Croatia into three ecoregions—Pannonian mixed forests, Dinaric Mountains mixed forests and Illyrian deciduous forests. Biomes in Croatia include temperate broadleaf/mixed forest and Mediterranean forests, woodlands and scrub; all are in the Palearctic realm.

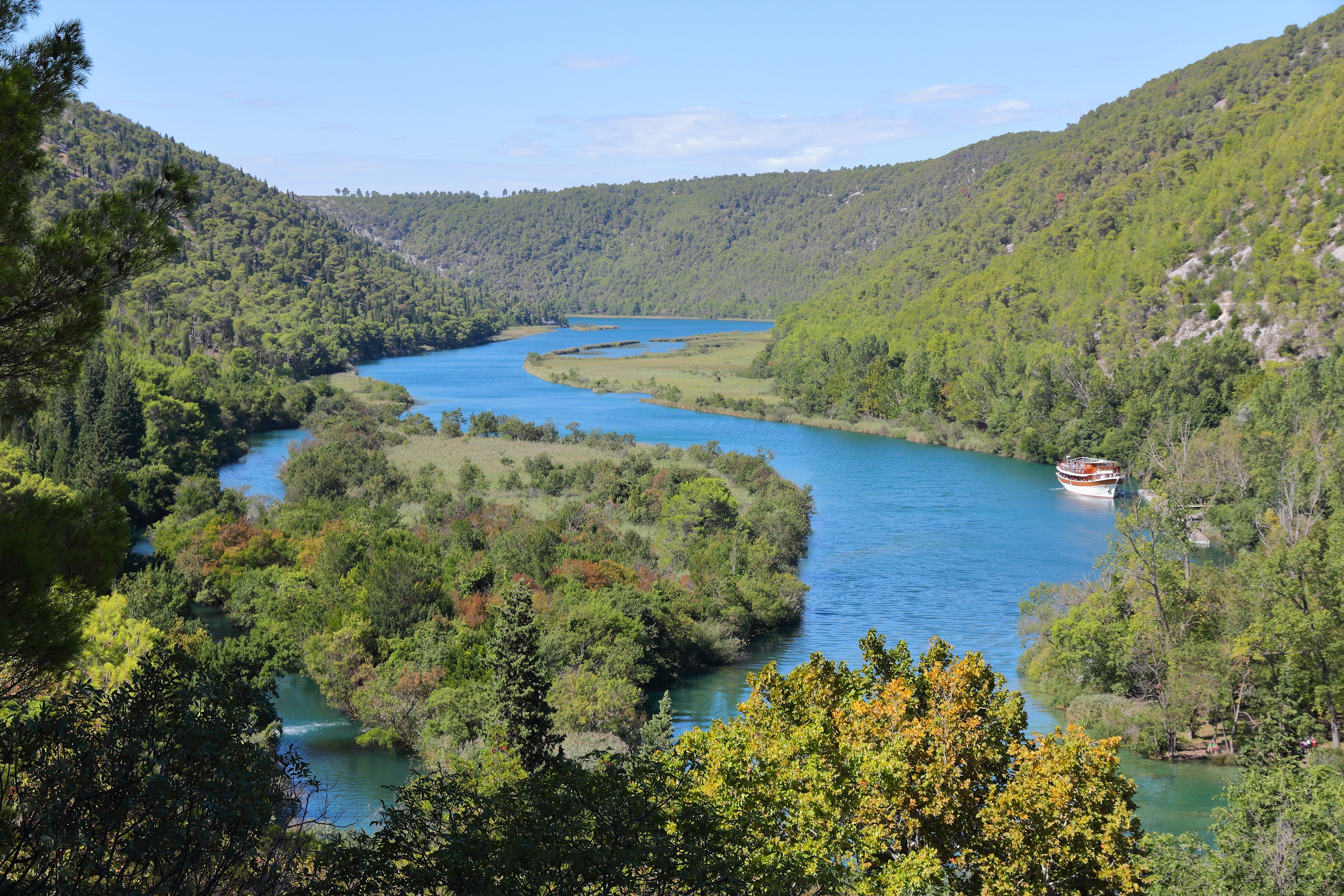
Krka river in Krka National Park

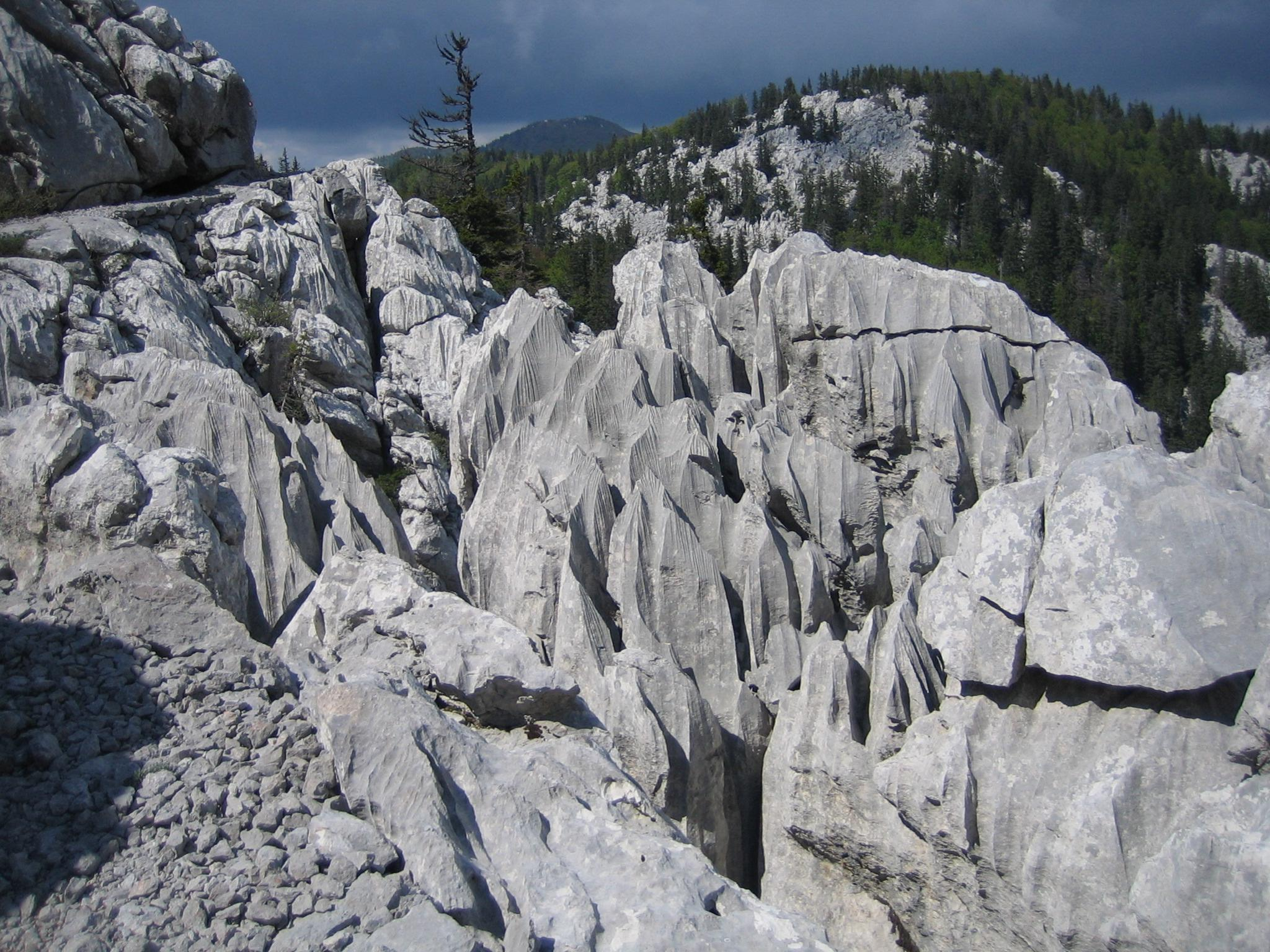
Karst in National Park Sjeverni Velebit

Croatia has 38,226 known taxa, 2.8% of which are endemic; the actual number (including undiscovered species) is estimated to be between 50,000 and 100,000. The estimate is supported by nearly 400 new taxa of invertebrates discovered in Croatia in 2000–2005 alone. There are more than a thousand endemic species, especially in the Velebit and Biokovo mountains, Adriatic islands and karst rivers. Legislation protects 1,131 species. Indigenous cultivars of plants and breeds of domesticated animals are also numerous; they include five breeds of horses, five breeds of cattle, eight breeds of sheep, two breeds of pigs and a poultry breed. Even the indigenous breeds include nine endangered or critically endangered ones.

Known and endemic taxa in Croatia
Name	Known taxa	Endemic taxa	Endemic taxa, %
Plants	8,871	523	5.90%
Fungi	4,500	0	–
Lichens	1,019	0	–
Mammals	101	5	4.95%
Birds	387	0	–
Reptiles	41	9	21.95%
Amphibians	20	7	35.00%
Freshwater fish	152	17	12.00%
Marine fish	442	6	1.36%
Terrestrial invertebrates	15,228	350	2.30%
Freshwater invertebrates	1,850	171	9.24%
Marine invertebrates	5,655	0	–
TOTAL	38,266	1,088	2.84%

There are 444 Croatian protected areas, encompassing 8.5% of the country. These include 8 national parks, 2 strict reserves and 11 nature parks, accounting for 78% of the total protected area. The most famous protected area and the oldest national park in Croatia is the Plitvice Lakes National Park, a UNESCO World Heritage Site. Velebit Nature Park is a part of the UNESCO Man and the Biosphere Programme. The strict and special reserves, as well as the national and nature parks, are managed and protected by the central government, while other protected areas are managed by counties. In 2005, the National Ecological Network was set up as the first step in preparation for EU membership and joining the Natura 2000 network.

Habitat destruction represents a threat to biodiversity in Croatia, as developed and agricultural land is expanded into previous natural habitats, while habitat fragmentation occurs as roads are created or expanded. A further threat to biodiversity is the introduction of invasive species, with Caulerpa racemosa and C. taxifolia identified as especially problematic ones. The invasive algae are monitored and regularly removed to protect the benthic habitat. Agricultural monocultures have also been identified as a threat to biodiversity.

=== Ecology ===
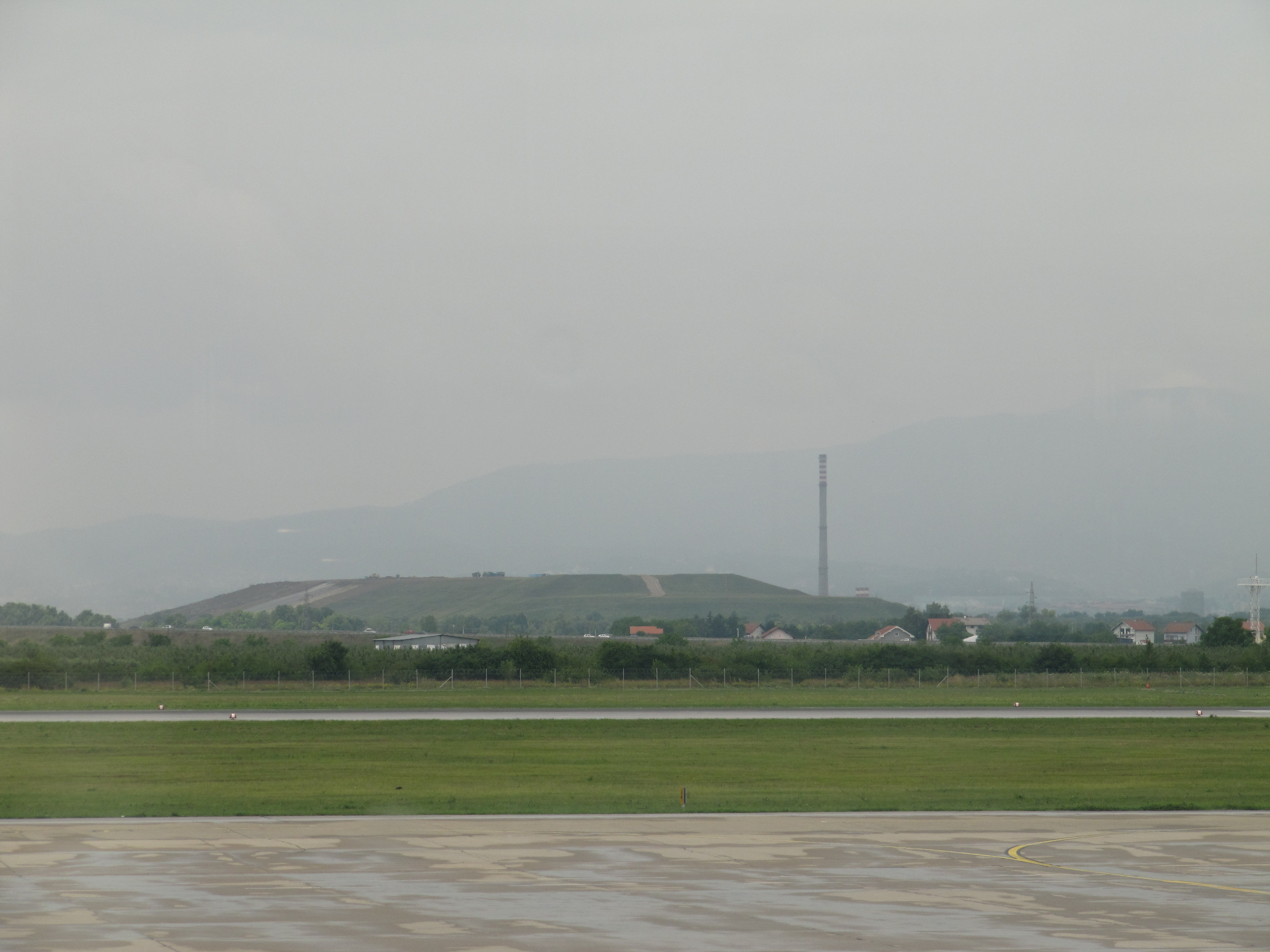
The Jakuševec landfill, used for Zagreb's solid waste disposal

The ecological footprint of Croatia's population and industry varies significantly between the country's regions since 50% of the population resides in 26.8% of the nation's territory, with a particularly high impact made by the city of Zagreb and Zagreb County areas—their combined area comprises 6.6% of Croatia's territory while encompassing 25% of the population. The ecological footprint is most notably from the increased development of settlements and the sea coast leading to habitat fragmentation. Between 1998 and 2008, the greatest changes of land use pertained to artificially developed areas, but the scale of development is negligible compared to EU member states.

The Croatian Environment Agency (CEA), a public institution established by the Government of Croatia to collect and analyse information on the environment, has identified further ecological problems as well as various degrees of progress in terms of curbing their environmental impact. These problems include inadequate legal landfills as well as the presence of illegal landfills; between 2005 and 2008, 62 authorised and 423 illegal landfills were rehabilitated. In the same period, the number of issued waste management licences doubled, while the annual municipal solid waste volume increased by 23%, reaching 403 kilograms (888 pounds) per capita. The processes of soil acidification and organic matter degradation are present throughout Croatia, with increasing soil salinity levels in the Neretva river plain and spreading areas of alkali soil in Slavonia.

Croatian air pollution levels reflect the drop in industrial production recorded in 1991 at the onset of the Croatian War of Independence—pre-war emission levels were only reached in 1997. The use of desulfurised fuels has led to a 25% reduction of sulphur dioxide emissions between 1997 and 2004, and a further 7.2% drop by 2007. The rise in NO_{x} emissions halted in 2007 and reversed in 2008. The use of unleaded petrol reduced emissions of lead into the atmosphere by 91.5% between 1997 and 2004. Air quality measurements indicate that the air in rural areas is essentially clean, and in urban centres it generally complies with legal requirements. The most significant sources of greenhouse gas (GHG) emissions in Croatia are energy production (72%), industry (13%) and agriculture (11%). The average annual increase of GHG emissions is 3%, remaining within the Kyoto Protocol limits. Between 1990 and 2007, the use of ozone depleting substances was reduced by 92%; their use is expected to be abolished by 2015.

Even though Croatia has sufficient water resources at its disposal, these are not uniformly distributed and public water supply network losses remain high—estimated at 44%. Between 2004 and 2008, the number of stations monitoring surface water pollution increased by 20%; the CEA reported 476 cases of water pollution in this period. At the same time organic waste pollution levels decreased slightly, which is attributed to the completion of new sewage treatment plants; their number increased 20%, reaching a total of 101. Nearly all of Croatia's groundwater aquifers are top quality, unlike the available surface water; the latter's quality varies in terms of biochemical oxygen demand and bacteriological water analysis results. As of 2008, 80% of the Croatian population are served by the public water supply system, but only 44% of the population have access to the public sewerage network, with septic systems in use. Adriatic Sea water quality monitoring between 2004 and 2008 indicated very good, oligotrophic conditions along most of the coast, while areas of increased eutrophication were identified in the Bay of Bakar, the Bay of Kaštela, the Port of Šibenik and near Ploče; other areas of localised pollution were identified near the larger coastal cities. In the period between 2004 and 2008, the CEA identified 283 cases of marine pollution (including 128 from vessels), which was a drop of 15% relative to the period encompassed by the previous report, 1997 to August 2005.

=== Land use ===
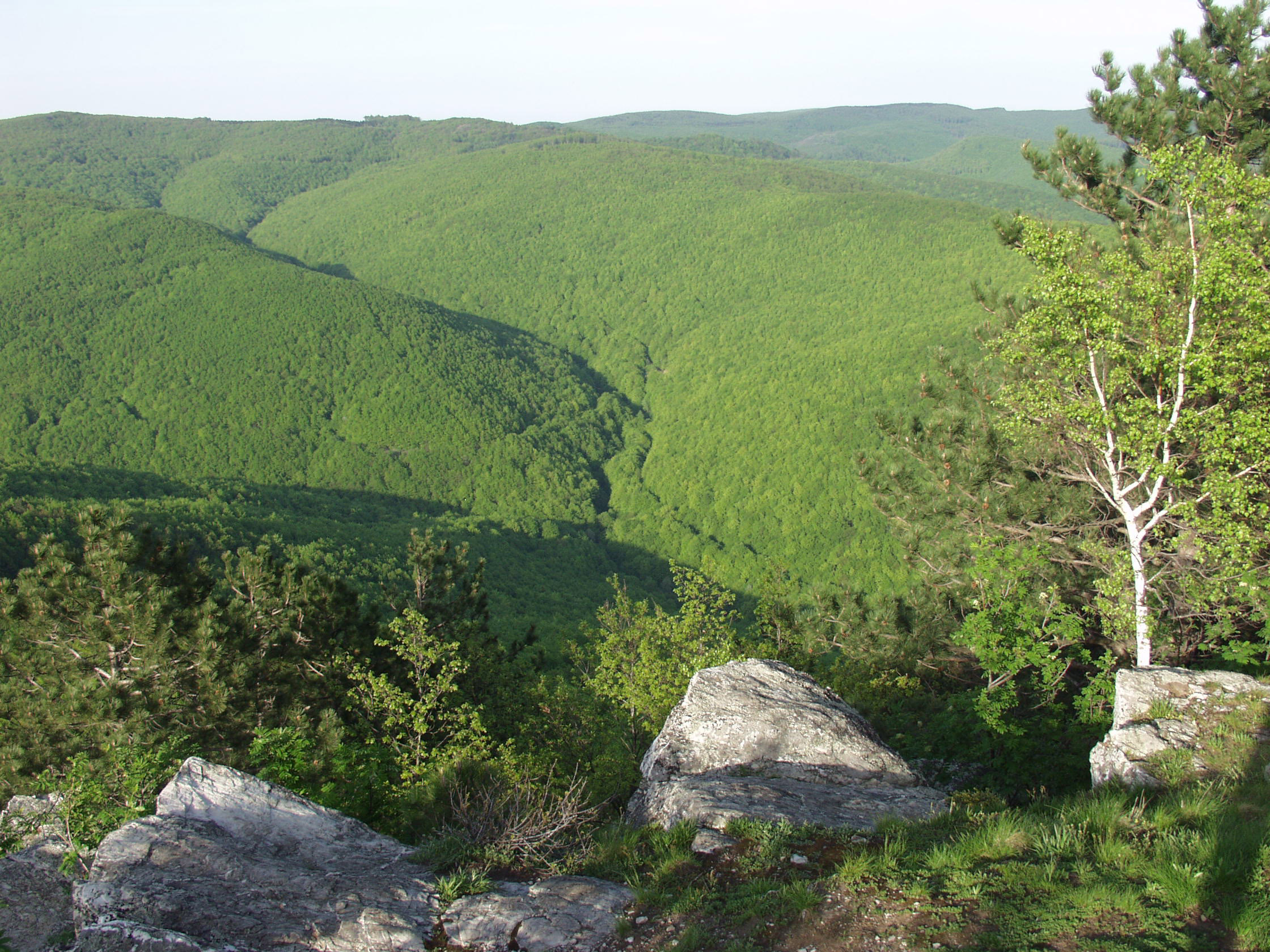
Forest-covered Papuk

As of 2006, 46.8% of Croatia was occupied by 26,487.6 square kilometres (10,226.9 sq mi) of forest and shrub, while a further 22,841 square kilometres (8,819 sq mi) or 40.4% of the land was used for diverse agricultural uses including 4,389.1 square kilometres (1,694.6 sq mi), or 7.8% of the total, for permanent crops. Bush and grass cover was present on 4,742.1 square kilometres (1,830.9 sq mi) or 8.4% of the territory, inland waters took up 539.3 square kilometres (208.2 sq mi) or 1.0% and marshes covered 200 square kilometres (77 sq mi) or 0.4% of the country. Artificial surfaces (primarily consisting of urban areas, roads, non-agricultural vegetation, sports areas and other recreational facilities) took up 1,774.5 square kilometres (685.1 sq mi) or 3.1% of the country's area. The greatest impetus for land use changes is the expansion of settlements and road construction.

Because of the Croatian War of Independence, there are numerous leftover minefields in Croatia, largely tracing former front lines. As of 2006, suspected minefields covered 954.5 square kilometres (368.5 sq mi). As of 2012, 62% of the remaining minefields are situated in forests, 26% of them are found in agricultural land, and 12% are found in other land. Even though it was expected that mine clearance will be complete by 2019, 51.3 square kilometres (19.8 square miles) of land remain suspected of containing land mines in 2025.

=== Regions ===
Croatia is traditionally divided into numerous, often overlapping geographic regions, whose borders are not always clearly defined. The largest and most readily recognisable ones throughout the country are Central Croatia (also described as the Zagreb macro-region), Eastern Croatia (largely corresponding with Slavonia), and Mountainous Croatia (Lika and Gorski Kotar; to the west of Central Croatia). These three comprise the inland or continental part of Croatia. Coastal Croatia consists of a further two regions: Dalmatia or the southern littoral, between the general area of the city of Zadar and the southernmost tip of the country; and the northern littoral located north of Dalmatia, encompassing the Croatian Littoral and Istria. The geographical regions generally do not conform to county boundaries or other administrative divisions, and all of them encompass further, more specific, geographic regions.

== Human geography ==
=== Demographics ===
2011 Croatian population density by county in persons per km^{2}: <30 30-49 50-69 70-89 90-119 120-200 >1200

The demographic features of the Croatian population are known through censuses, normally conducted in ten-year intervals and analysed by various statistical bureaus since the 1850s. The Croatian Bureau of Statistics has performed this task since the 1990s. The latest census in Croatia was performed in April 2011. The permanent population of Croatia at the 2011 census had reached 4.29 million. The population density was 75.8 inhabitants per square kilometre, and the overall life expectancy in Croatia at birth is 75.7 years. The population rose steadily (with the exception of censuses taken following the two world wars) from 2.1 million in 1857 until 1991, when it peaked at 4.7 million. Since 1991, Croatia's death rate has continuously exceeded its birth rate; the natural growth rate of the population is thus currently negative. Croatia is currently in the demographic transition's fourth or fifth stage. In terms of age structure, the population is dominated by the 15‑ to 64‑year‑old segment. The median age of the population is 41.4, and the gender ratio of the total population is 0.93 males per 1 female.

Croatia is inhabited mostly by Croats (89.6%), while minorities include Serbs (4.5%) and 21 other ethnicities (less than 1% each) recognised by the Constitution of Croatia. The demographic history of Croatia is marked by significant migrations, including: the Croats' arrival in the area; the growth of the Hungarian and German speaking population after the personal union of Croatia and Hungary; joining of the Habsburg Empire; migrations set off by the Ottoman conquests; and the growth of the Italian-speaking population in Istria and Dalmatia during the Venetian rule there. After Austria-Hungary's collapse, the Hungarian population declined, while the German-speaking population was forced out or fled during the last part of and after World War II, and a similar fate was suffered by the Italian population. The late 19th century and the 20th century were marked by large scale economic migrations abroad. The 1940s and the 1950s in Yugoslavia were marked by internal migrations in Yugoslavia, as well as by urbanisation. The most recent significant migrations came as a result of the Croatian War of Independence when hundreds of thousands were displaced.

The Croatian language is Croatia's official language, but the languages of constitutionally-recognised minorities are officially used in some local government units. Croatian is the native language identified by 96% of the population. A 2009 survey revealed that 78% of Croatians claim knowledge of at least one foreign language—most often English. The largest religions of Croatia are Roman Catholicism (86.3%), Orthodox Christianity (4.4%) and Islam (1.5%). Literacy in Croatia stands at 98.1%. The proportion of the population aged 15 and over attaining academic degrees has grown rapidly since 2001, doubling and reaching 16.7% by 2008. An estimated 4.5% of GDP is spent for education. Primary and secondary education are available in Croatian and in the languages of recognised minorities. Croatia has a universal health care system and in 2010, the nation spent 6.9% of its GDP on healthcare. The net monthly income in September 2011 averaged 5,397 kuna (c. €729). The most significant sources of employment in 2008 were wholesale and retail trade, the manufacturing industry and construction. In October 2011, the unemployment rate was 17.4%. Croatia's median equivalent household income tops the average Purchasing Power Standard of the ten countries which joined the EU in 2004, while trailing the EU average. The 2011 census recorded a total of 1.5 million private households; most owned their own housing.

=== Political geography ===
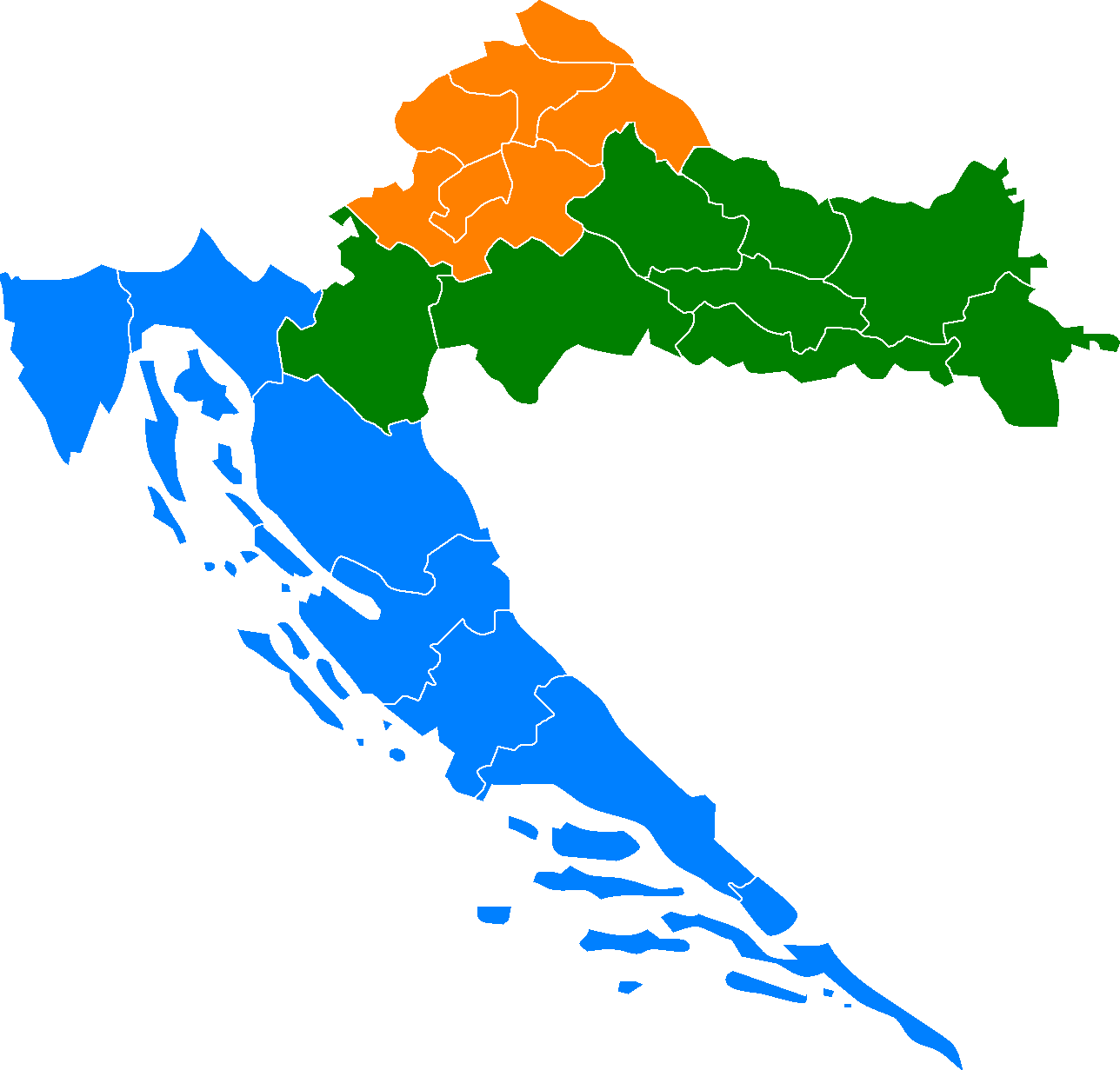
NUTS of Croatia: Northwest Croatia Central and Eastern (Pannonian) Croatia Adriatic Croatia

Croatia was first subdivided into counties in the Middle Ages. The divisions changed over time to reflect losses of territory to Ottoman conquest and subsequent liberation of the same territory, in addition to changes in the political status of Dalmatia, Dubrovnik and Istria. The traditional division of the country into counties was abolished in the 1920s, when the Kingdom of Serbs, Croats and Slovenes and the subsequent Kingdom of Yugoslavia introduced oblasts and banovinas respectively. Communist-ruled Croatia, as a constituent part of post-WWII Yugoslavia, abolished earlier divisions and introduced (mostly rural) municipalities, subdividing Croatia into approximately one hundred municipalities. Counties were reintroduced in 1992 by legislation, significantly altered in terms of territory relative to the pre-1920s subdivisions—for instance, in 1918 the Transleithanian part of Croatia was divided into eight counties with their seats in Bjelovar, Gospić, Ogulin, Požega, Vukovar, Varaždin, Osijek and Zagreb, while the 1992 legislation established 14 counties in the same territory. Međimurje County was established in the eponymous region acquired through the 1920 Treaty of Trianon. (The 1990 Croatian Constitution provided for a Chamber of the Counties as part of the government, and for counties themselves without specifying their names or number. However, the counties were not actually re-established until 1992, and the first Chamber of the Counties was elected in 1993.)

Since the counties were re-established in 1992, Croatia has been divided into 20 counties and the capital city of Zagreb, the latter having the authority and legal status of a county and a city at the same time (Zagreb County outside the city is administratively separate as of 1997). The county borders have changed in some instances since (for reasons such as historical ties and requests by cities), with the latest revision taking place in 2006. The counties subdivide into 127 cities and 429 municipalities.

The EU Nomenclature of Territorial Units for Statistics (NUTS) division of Croatia is performed in several tiers. NUTS 1 level places the entire country in a single unit, while there are three NUTS 2 regions; these are Central and Eastern (Pannonian) Croatia, Northwest Croatia and Adriatic Croatia. The last encompasses all counties along the Adriatic coast. Northwest Croatia includes the city of Zagreb and Krapina-Zagorje, Varaždin, Koprivnica-Križevci, Međimurje and Zagreb counties, and the Central and Eastern (Pannonian) Croatia includes the remaining areas—Bjelovar-Bilogora, Virovitica-Podravina, Požega-Slavonia, Brod-Posavina, Osijek-Baranja, Vukovar-Syrmia, Karlovac and Sisak-Moslavina counties. Individual counties and the city of Zagreb represent NUTS 3 level subdivision units in Croatia. The NUTS Local administrative unit divisions are two-tiered. The LAU 1 divisions match the counties and the city of Zagreb—in effect making these the same as NUTS 3 units—while the LAU 2 subdivisions correspond to the cities and municipalities of Croatia.

Counties of Croatia

County	Seat	Area (km^{2})	Population
Bjelovar-Bilogora	Bjelovar	2,652	119,743
Brod-Posavina	Slavonski Brod	2,043	158,559
Dubrovnik-Neretva	Dubrovnik	1,783	122,783
Istria	Pazin	2,820	208,440
Karlovac	Karlovac	3,622	128,749
Koprivnica-Križevci	Koprivnica	1,746	115,582
Krapina-Zagorje	Krapina	1,224	133,064
Lika-Senj	Gospić	5,350	51,022
Međimurje	Čakovec	730	114,414
Osijek-Baranja	Osijek	4,152	304,899
Požega-Slavonia	Požega	1,845	78,031
Primorje-Gorski Kotar	Rijeka	3,582	296,123
Šibenik-Knin	Šibenik	2,939	109,320
Sisak-Moslavina	Sisak	4,463	172,977
Split-Dalmatia	Split	4,534	455,242
Varaždin	Varaždin	1,261	176,046
Virovitica-Podravina	Virovitica	2,068	84,586
Vukovar-Srijem	Vukovar	2,448	180,117
Zadar	Zadar	3,642	170,398
Zagreb County	Zagreb	3,078	317,642
City of Zagreb	Zagreb	641	792,875

=== Urbanisation ===
The average urbanisation rate in Croatia stands at 56%, with a growing urban population and shrinking rural population. The largest city and the nation's capital is Zagreb, with an urban population of 686,568 in the city itself. Zagreb's metropolitan area encompasses 341 additional settlements and, by the year 2001, the population of the area had reached 978,161; approximately 60% of Zagreb County's residents live in Zagreb's metropolitan area, as does about 41% of Croatia's urban population. The cities of Split and Rijeka are the largest settlements on the Croatian Adriatic coast, with each city's population being over 100,000. There are five other Croatian cities exceeding 50,000 people: Osijek, Zadar, Pula, Velika Gorica and Slavonski Brod; the Zagreb district of Sesvete, which has the status of a standalone settlement but not a city, also has such a large population. A further eleven cities are populated by more than 20,000.

Largest cities or towns in Croatia Croatian Bureau of Statistics - 2021 census
Rank	Name	County	Pop.	Rank	Name	County	Pop.
1	Zagreb	Zagreb	767,131	11	Šibenik	Šibenik-Knin	42,599
2	Split	Split-Dalmatia	161,312	12	Dubrovnik	Dubrovnik-Neretva	41,562
3	Rijeka	Primorje-Gorski Kotar	108,622	13	Sisak	Sisak-Moslavina	40,121
4	Osijek	Osijek-Baranja	96,848	14	Kaštela	Split-Dalmatia	37,794
5	Zadar	Zadar	70,829	15	Samobor	Zagreb County	37,435
6	Velika Gorica	Zagreb County	61,198	16	Bjelovar	Bjelovar-Bilogora	36,316
7	Pula	Istria	52,411	17	Vinkovci	Vukovar-Srijem	30,842
8	Slavonski Brod	Brod-Posavina	50,039	18	Koprivnica	Koprivnica-Križevci	28,580
9	Karlovac	Karlovac	49,594	19	Čakovec	Međimurje County	27,122
10	Varaždin	Varaždin	43,782	20	Solin	Split-Dalmatia	24,862

== See also ==
- Geography of Europe

== Works cited ==
- Biondich, Mark (2000). Stjepan Radić, the Croat Peasant Party, and the politics of mass mobilization, 1904–1928. University of Toronto Press. ISBN 978-0-8020-8294-7.
- Blake, Gerald Henry; Topalović, Duško; Schofield, Clive H (1996). The maritime boundaries of the Adriatic Sea. IBRU. ISBN 978-1-897643-22-8.
- Frucht, Richard C (2005). Eastern Europe: An Introduction to the People, Lands, and Culture. ABC-CLIO. ISBN 978-1-57607-800-6.
