= Đurinići =

- Village
- Location within Croatia
- Country: Croatia
- County: Dubrovnik-Neretva County
- Municipality: Konavle

Area
  - Total: 2.3 sq mi (5.9 km^{2})

Population (2021)
  - Total: 61
  - Density: 27/sq mi (10/km^{2})
- Time zone: UTC+1 (CET)
  - Summer (DST): UTC+2 (CEST)

Đurinići is a village in Croatia, in Konavle municipality. It is connected by the D516 highway.

== Demographics ==
According to the 2021 census, its population was 61.
