= D516 road =

Road in Croatia

D516 state road

Route information
- Length: 14.4 km (8.9 mi)

Major junctions
- From: Konfin border crossing to Montenegro
- To: D8 in Karasovići

Location
- Country: Croatia
- Counties: Dubrovnik-Neretva

Highway system
- Highways in Croatia

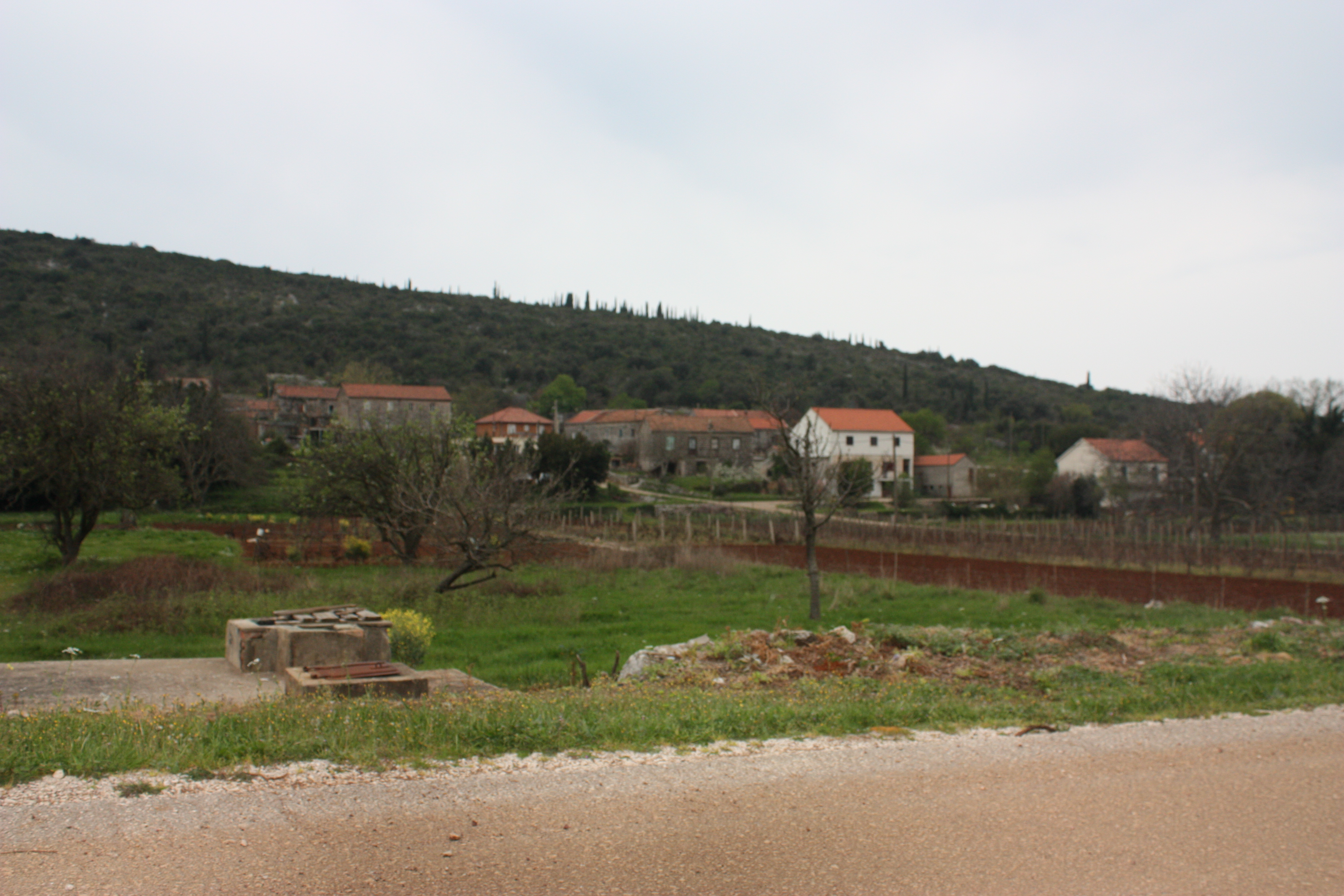
Vitaljina, on the D516 road route

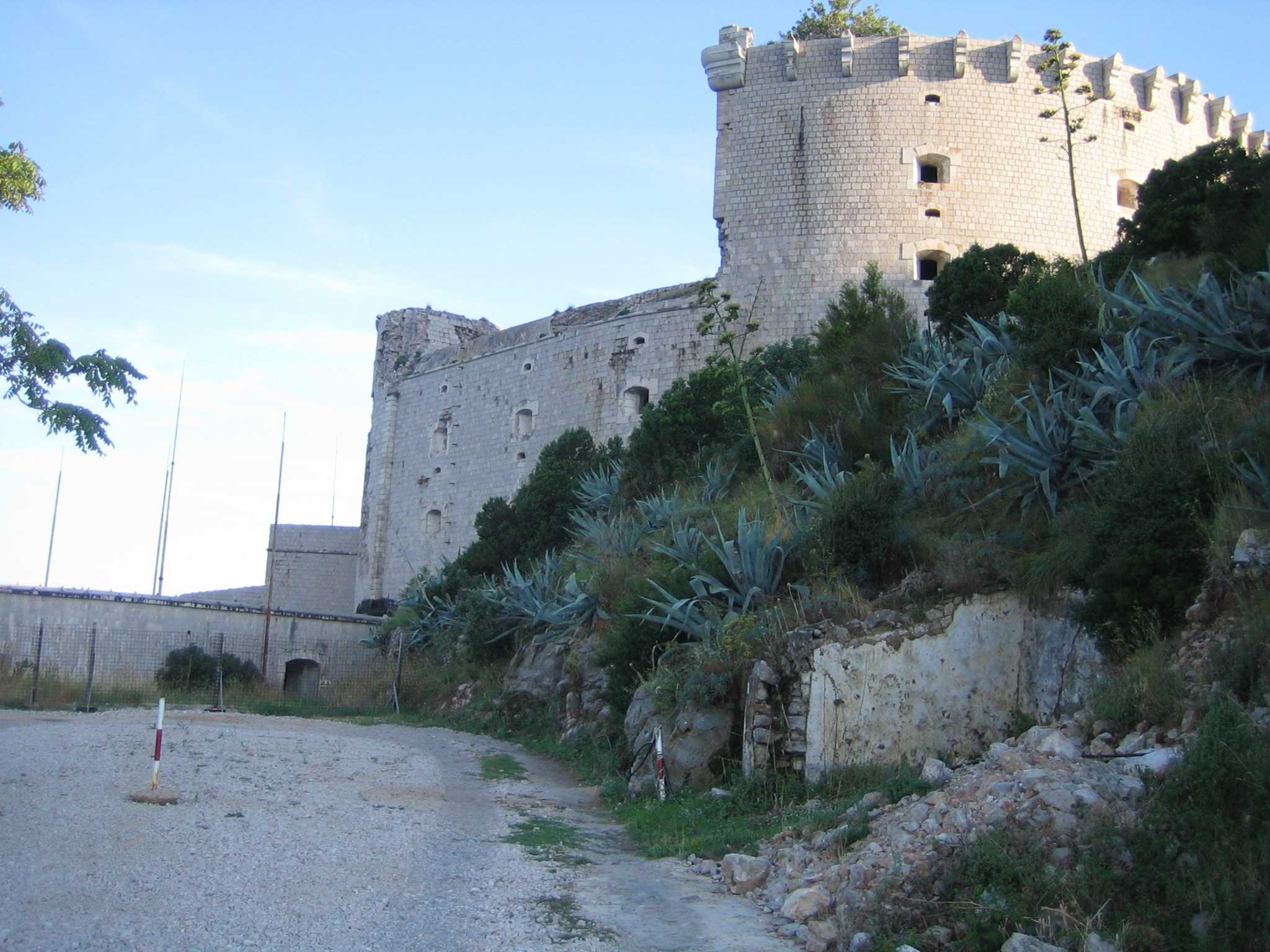
Prevlaka fortress, near the D516 road route

D516 is a state road in the southern Croatia connecting the Konfin border crossing to Montenegro to the D8 state road south of Cavtat. The road is 14.4 km (8.9 mi) long.

The road, as well as all other state roads in Croatia, is managed and maintained by Hrvatske ceste, state owned company.

== Road junctions and populated areas ==
D516 junctions/populated areas
Type	Slip roads/Notes
	Konfin border crossing to Montenegro. The road extends to Herceg Novi, Montenegro. The southern terminus of the road.
	Vitaljina
	Đurinići
	Pločice; Ž6240 to Mikulići and Radovčići.
	Karasovići; D8 to Dubrovnik and Cavtat (to the west) and to Karasovići border crossing to Montenegro (to the east). The northern terminus of the road.

== See also ==
- Prevlaka
