= Vitaljina =

Southernmost settlement in Croatia

- Village
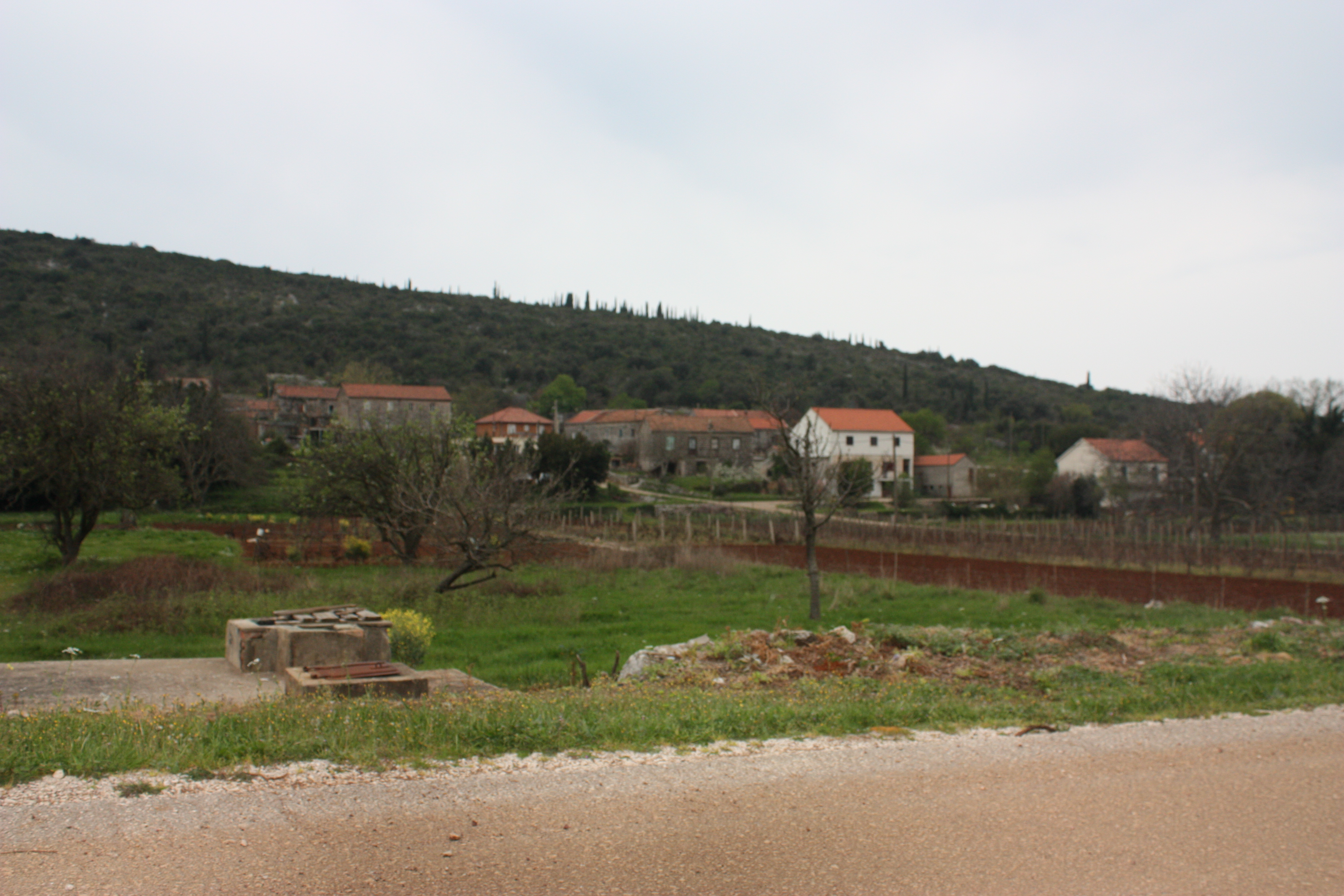
- Vitaljina in 2010

- Location within Croatia
- Country: Croatia
- County: Dubrovnik-Neretva
- Municipality: Konavle

Area
  - Total: 11.9 km^{2} (4.6 sq mi)

Population (2021)
  - Total: 153
  - Density: 12.9/km^{2} (33.3/sq mi)
- Time zone: UTC+1 (CET)
  - Summer (DST): UTC+2 (CEST)

Vitaljina is a village in the municipality of Konavle, in Dubrovnik-Neretva County, Croatia. Connected by the D516 state road, it is the southernmost settlement in Croatia, located between the Adriatic Sea and Montenegro. As of 2021, the population of Vitaljina was 153.

The village has faced attacks from numerous groups in its history. In the 16th century, raiders and pirates targeted the village because it was close to the Dalmatian coast. When the Yugoslav People's Army (JNA) invaded Croatia during the Croatian War of Independence, Vitaljina was the first village attacked in Dubrovnik-Neretva County. The JNA occupied and destroyed the village during the war.

== History ==
The villagers of Vitaljina were frequent victims of raiders and pirates in the 16th century. The attackers disregarded the authority of the Republic of Ragusa and targeted Vitaljina in particular due to its proximity to the Dalmatian coast.

During the Croatian War of Independence, Vitaljina was the first part of Dubrovnik-Neretva County to be attacked by Yugoslav forces, in the evening of 23 September 1991. The Yugoslav People's Army (JNA) and irregular Serb forces occupied the village before looting and razing it. The JNA desecrated graves in the village, using them to store landmines and other explosives.

On 1 September 2022, a waterspout of intensity IF1 made landfall in Vitaljina. The waterspout damaged the local cultural center and a family residence, lifted roofs and fences from their foundations, felled trees, and destroyed a football field and building-in-construction. Additionally, a landslide caused by the waterspout damaged a vehicle. No casualties were reported.

== Geography ==
The area of Vitaljina is 11.9 square kilometres (4.6 sq mi). The village is the southernmost settlement in Croatia.

== Demographics ==
The 2021 census recorded a population of 153 residents in Vitaljina. The majority were Croats and Catholic.

== Transport ==
Croatia's D516 state road terminates at Vitaljina's border with the Montenegrin village of Kobila. The 27 Dubrovnik-Vitaljina bus operated by Libertas Dubrovnik makes regular trips every weekday from and to Dubrovnik.
