= Pločice =

- Village
- Location within Croatia
- Country: Croatia
- County: Dubrovnik-Neretva County
- Municipality: Konavle

Area
  - Total: 1.7 sq mi (4.3 km^{2})

Population (2021)
  - Total: 68
  - Density: 41/sq mi (16/km^{2})
- Time zone: UTC+1 (CET)
  - Summer (DST): UTC+2 (CEST)

Pločice is a village in Croatia, in Konavle municipality. It is connected by the D516 state street.

== Demographics ==
According to the 2021 census, its population was 68.
