= George Vakalo =

George Vakalo (Greek: Γιώργος Βακαλό (Βακαλόπουλος); 1902 – 2 October 1991) was a 20th-century Greek visual artist, renowned for his contributions to scenography and painting.

== Biography ==
Born in Constantinople in 1902, his real surname was Vakalopoulos. Vakalo received his initial artistic training in Constantinople under Lysandros Prasinos, who taught him painting and miniature art. In 1922, he moved to Paris to study decorative arts at the École des Arts Decoratifs and at the Academies Grand Chaumière and Julian, completing his studies in 1928. Influenced by surrealism, he also studied scenography at the Theatre de l’Atelier under Charles Dullin and apprenticed with scenographer Ladislas Medgyes. Additionally, he worked as a scenographer at the Globe Theatre in London. During the German invasion in 1940, Vakalo was forced to relocate to Greece, where he continued his work in scenography and costume design with local theaters.

In 1944, Vakalo married the poet and art critic Eleni Vakalo. Towards the end of 1949, he co-founded the artistic group "Stathmi". In 1957, along with Panayiotis Tetsis, Frantzes Frantziskakis, and his wife Eleni, he established the Vakalo School, Greece's first school of decorative arts. He also participated in significant painting exhibitions in Greece and abroad and held several solo exhibitions. He worked as a scenographer and costume designer for major Greek organizations like the Greek National Opera (for about 40 years), the National Theatre of Greece and the National Theatre of Northern Greece. Vakalo was a member of the Chamber of Fine Arts of Greece (EETE).

In 1953, the French government awarded him the Knight of the Legion of Honor. He continued to teach at the Vakalo School until 1978.

Vakalo died at the age of 89 and was buried in the Second Cemetery in Patisia.

== Artistic Style and Work ==
Vakalo's painting style is characterized by a unique personal hyperrealism, where line and color play primary roles, often in soft tones, and a strong decorative inclination is evident. Despite his involvement with the group "Stathmi" in 1949, he maintained a distance from the neorealist movement within the group, staying true to the interwar abstract tendencies he had encountered during his apprenticeship in France.
