= Eleni Vakalo =

Greek poet, art critic and art historian

- Ελένη Βακαλό
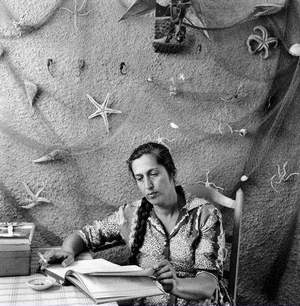
- Born: 26 October 1921; Constantinople, Ottoman Empire
- Died: 10 October 2001 (aged 79); Athens, Greece
- Occupations: Poet, art critic, art historian
- Spouse: George Vakalo

Eleni Vakalo (Greek: Ελένη Βακαλό; 1921–2001) was a Greek poet, art critic and art historian.

== Biography ==
Eleni Vakalo, née Stavrinou, was born on 26 October 1921, in Constantinople, and in 1922 her parents moved to Athens. She studied archaeology at the University of Athens (1940–45) and art history at Sorbonne (1948). In 1944 she married the painter George Vakalo (1902–1991).

Vakalo wrote 14 books of poetry and nine volumes of art theory and art history. As an art critic she was a columnist between 1955 and 1975. She founded the Vakalo School of Arts and Design with her husband in 1958 and was an instructor there until 1990. Vakalo's works have proven difficult to translate as her unexpected retooling of Greek syntax gives rise to grammatical ambiguity.

Vakalo died on 10 October 2001 in Athens.

== Awards ==
- First State Award for Poetry, 1991
- Essay Award of the Academy of Athens, 1997
- Honorary degree in history-archaeology from the University of Thessaloniki, 1998
- Honorary degree from the University of Derby, 2000

== Bibliography ==
=== Poetry ===
- Theme and Variations (Θέμα και Παραλλαγές), Athens, Icaros, 1945
- Recollections from a nightmarish city (Αναμνήσεις από μια εφιαλτική πολιτεία), Athens, 1948
- In the form of theorems (Στη μορφή των θεωρημάτων), Athens, 1951
- The Forest (Το Δάσος), Athens, Karavia, 1954
- Mural (Τοιχογραφία), Athens, The Friends of Literature, 1956
- Age's diary (Ημερολόγιο της ηλικίας), Athens, Diphros, 1958
- Description of the body (Περιγραφή του σώματος), Athens, Diphros, 1959
- The Concept of blind people (Η Έννοια των τυφλών), Athens, 1962
- The Way of being in danger (Ο Τρόπος να Κινδυνεύομε), Athens, 1966
- Genealogy/Γενεαλογία (Greek-English edition, English translation by Paul Merchant), The Rougemont Press, 1971
- Of the World (Του Κόσμου), Athens, Kedros, 1978
- The foolishness of Ma Rodalina (Οι παλάβρες της Κυρά-Ροδαλίνας), Athens, Ypsilon, 1984
- Events and Stories of Ma Rodalina (Γεγονότα και Ιστορίες της Κυρά-Ροδαλίνας), Athens, 1990
- The Other Face of the Thing. Poetry 1954–1994 (Το Άλλο του Πράγματος. Ποίηση 1954–1994), Athens, Nepheli, 1995
- Selected poems (Επιλεγόμενα), Athens, Nepheli, 1997

=== Art theory ===
- Introduction to Topics of Painting (Εισαγωγή σε Θέματα Ζωγραφικής), Athens, Athens School of Fine Arts, 1960
- 12 Lectures on Modern Art (12 Μαθήματα για τη Σύγχρονη Τέχνη), Athens, "Hour", Centre of Art and Culture, 1973
- The Concept of Forms. Reading Art (Η Έννοια των Μορφών. Ανάγνωση της Τέχνης), Athens, "Hour", Centre of Art and Culture, 1979
- The Face of Post-War Art in Greece (Η Φυσιογνωμία της Μεταπολεμικής Τέχνης στην Ελλάδα, in four volumes), Athens, Kedros, 1980–84
- From the Viewer's Side. Essays (Από την Πλευρά του Θεατή. Δοκίμια), Athens, Kedros, 1989
- Giorgos Vakalo. The charm of writing. (Γιώργος Βακαλό. Το θέλγητρο της γραφής), Athens, "New Forms" Gallery, 1994
- Visual Arts Criticism (1950–1974) (Κριτική Εικαστικών Τεχνών (1950–1974), in two volumes), Athens, Kedros, 1996
