= Galijula =

Island in Croatia

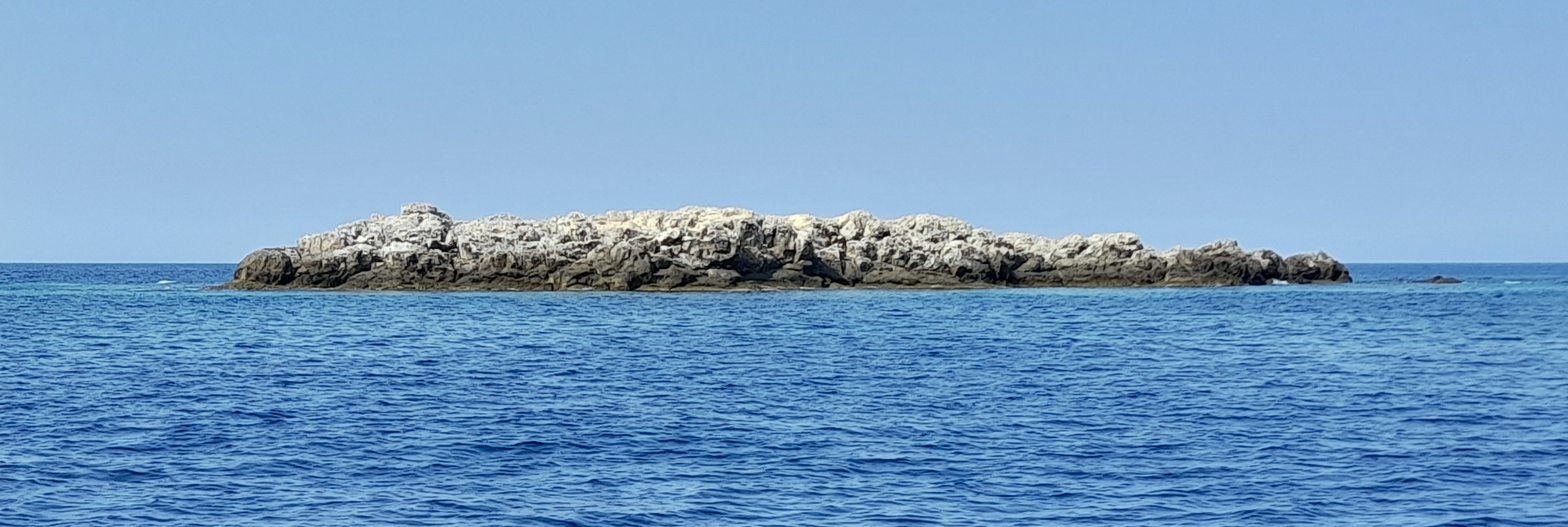

- Location within Croatia
- Interactive map of Galijula

Geography
- Location: Adriatic Sea
- Coordinates: 42°22′40″N 16°20′20″E
- Area: 0.0033 km^{2} (0.0013 sq mi)
- Coastline: 0.1 km (0.06 mi)

Administration
- Croatia
- County: Split-Dalmatia County

Galijula is an uninhabited isle in the southwestern Adriatic Sea, 3 nautical miles from the island of Palagruža. It belongs to the municipality of Komiža in Split-Dalmatia County, Croatia. It is the southernmost point of Croatia.
