= Bašanija =

Bašanija Bassania
- Village
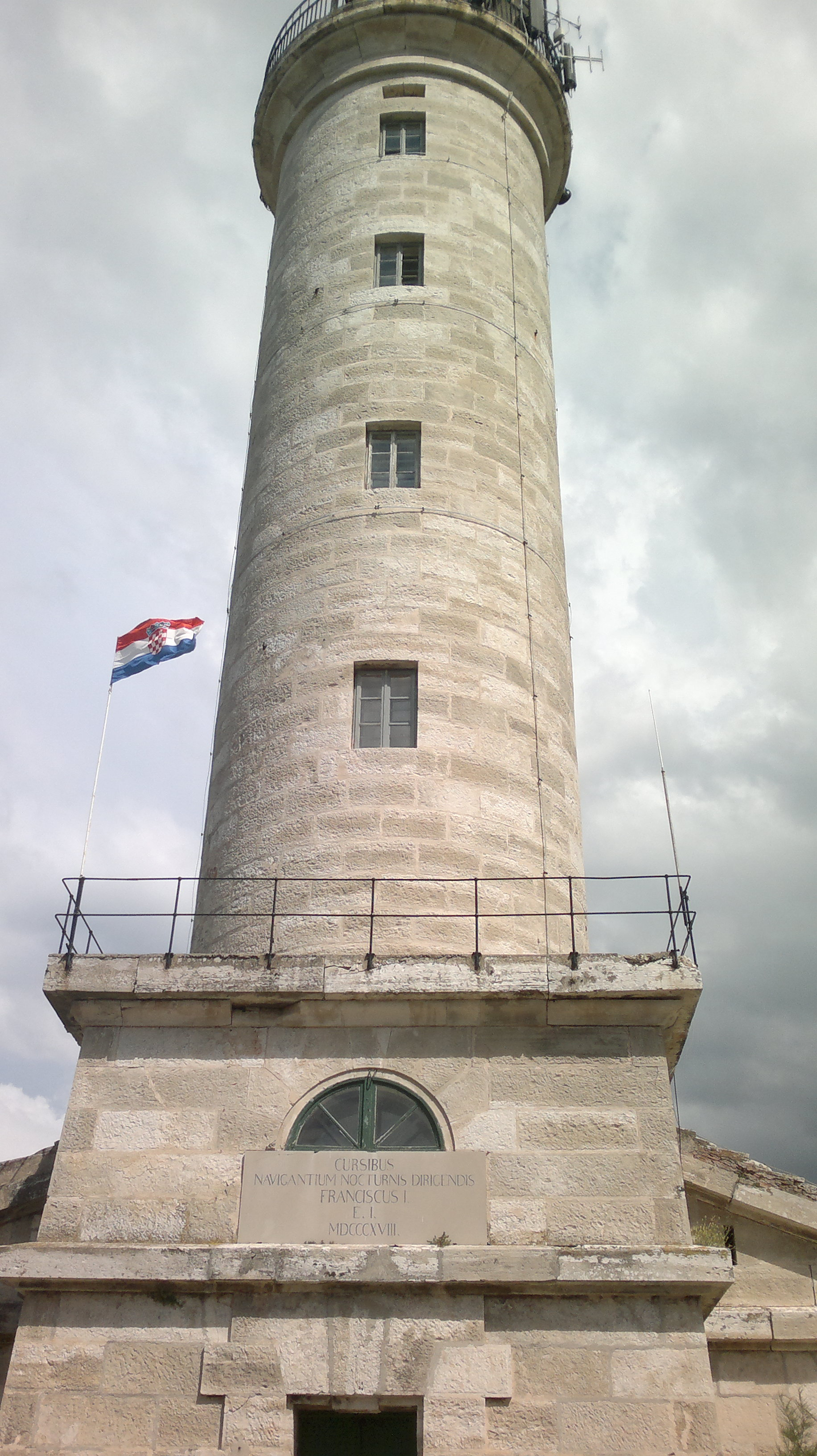

- Location within Croatia
- Coordinates: 45°29′6″N 13°30′0″E
- Country: Croatia
- County: Istria County
- Municipality: Umag

Area
  - Total: 0.50 sq mi (1.3 km^{2})

Population (2021)
  - Total: 193
  - Density: 380/sq mi (150/km^{2})
- Time zone: UTC+1 (CET)
  - Summer (DST): UTC+2 (CEST)
- Postal code: 52475 Savudrija
- Area code: 052

Bašanija (Italian: Bassania) is a naselje (settlement) in the municipality of Umag, Istria County, Croatia. It is the westernmost point of Croatia.

== Demographics ==
According to the 2021 census, its population was 193. According to the 2011 census, it had 256 inhabitants.
