= Operation Tiger (1992) =

Croatian Army offensive near Dubrovnik

- Part of the Croatian War of Independence
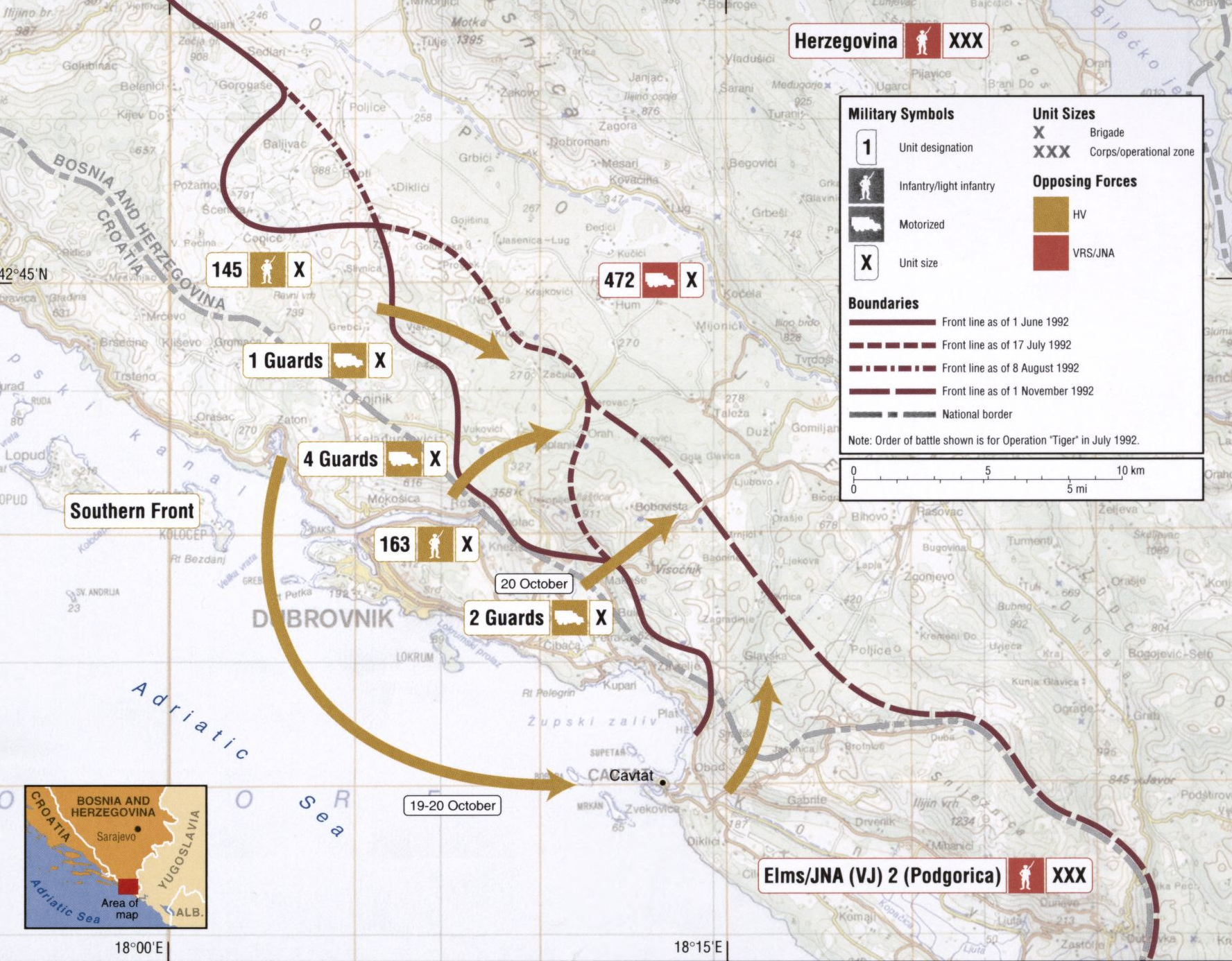
- Map of Operation Tiger and follow-up operations
Date	1–13 July 1992
Location	Vicinity of Dubrovnik 42.68°N 18.14°E
Result	Croatian victory

Belligerents
Croatia	Republika Srpska

Commanders and leaders
(Croatia) Anton Tus (Croatia) Janko Bobetko	(Republika Srpska) Radovan Grubač

Strength
1,475	Unknown

Operation Tiger (Croatian: Operacija Tigar) was a Croatian Army (HV) offensive conducted in areas of Croatia and Bosnia and Herzegovina near Dubrovnik between 1 and 13 July 1992. It was designed to push the Army of Republika Srpska (VRS) away from the city towards Popovo field and secure a supply route via Rijeka Dubrovačka, which was gained in early June as the siege of Dubrovnik by the Yugoslav People's Army (JNA) was lifted. The operation's success was facilitated by the establishment of the HV's Southern Front command and the successful conclusion of the May–June 1992 operations against the VRS in the Neretva River valley, which concluded with Operation Jackal.

Although Operation Tiger captured only 40 square kilometres (15 square miles) of territory, it secured the Ploče–Dubrovnik road and placed the HV in a position to capture the rest of southern Dalmatia over the following three-and-a-half months. That was achieved through a negotiated JNA withdrawal from Konavle followed by an HV amphibious operation in the area of Cavtat— capturing Konavle before the VRS could move in and reach the Adriatic Sea coast. Two additional HV offensives aimed at securing the Dubrovnik area defenses —Operation Liberated Land and an assault on the Vlaštica Peak— stabilized the HV's hold on the area and threatened VRS-held Trebinje in eastern Herzegovina. As a result of the JNA pullback, the Prevlaka peninsula was demilitarized and placed under United Nations control until 1996.

== Background ==
In August 1990, a revolution took place in Croatia; it was centred on the predominantly Serb-populated areas of the Dalmatian hinterland around the city of Knin, and in parts of the Lika, Kordun, and Banovina regions, and settlements in eastern Croatia with significant Serb populations. The areas were subsequently named the Republic of Serbian Krajina (RSK). After declaring its intention to integrate with Serbia, the Government of Croatia declared the RSK a rebellion. By March 1991, the conflict escalated into the Croatian War of Independence. In June 1991, Croatia declared its independence as Yugoslavia disintegrated. A three-month moratorium followed, after which the decision came into effect on 8 October. The RSK then initiated a campaign of ethnic cleansing against Croatian civilians, and most non-Serbs were expelled by early 1993. By November 1993, fewer than 400 ethnic Croats remained in the UN-protected area known as Sector South, and a further 1,500 – 2,000 remained in Sector North.

The Croatian National Guard (ZNG) was formed in May 1991 because the Yugoslav People's Army (JNA) increasingly supported the RSK and the Croatian Police were unable to cope with the situation. The ZNG was renamed the HV in November. The establishment of the Republic of Croatia Armed Forces was hampered by a UN arms embargo introduced in September. The final months of 1991 saw the fiercest fighting of the war, culminating in the Battle of the barracks, the siege of Dubrovnik, and the Battle of Vukovar.

In January 1992, the Sarajevo Agreement was signed by representatives of Croatia, the JNA, and the UN, and fighting between the two sides was paused. After a series of unsuccessful ceasefires, the United Nations Protection Force (UNPROFOR) was deployed to Croatia to supervise and maintain the agreement. The conflict largely passed on to entrenched positions and the JNA retreated from Croatia into Bosnia and Herzegovina, where a new conflict was anticipated. Serbia continued to support the RSK after the JNA pullout.

As the JNA disengaged from Croatia, its personnel prepared to set up a new Bosnian Serb army; Bosnian Serbs declared the Serbian Republic of Bosnia and Herzegovina on 9 January 1992. Between 29 February and 1 March 1992, a referendum on the independence of Bosnia and Herzegovina—which would later be cited as a pretext for the Bosnian War—was held. Bosnian Serbs set up barricades in the capital Sarajevo and elsewhere on 1 March, and the next day the first fatalities of the war were recorded in Sarajevo and Doboj. In the final days of March, the Bosnian Serb army started shelling Bosanski Brod, and the HV 108th Brigade crossed the border adjacent to the town in reply. and on 4 April, Serb artillery began shelling Sarajevo. The JNA and the VRS in Bosnia and Herzegovina were confronted by the Army of the Republic of Bosnia and Herzegovina (ARBiH) and the Croatian Defence Council (HVO), under the control of the Bosniak-dominated central government and the Bosnian Croat leadership respectively. The HV sometimes deployed to Bosnia and Herzegovina to support the HVO.

== Prelude ==
Dubrovnik on the map of Croatia. RSK and Yugoslav Army-held area near Dubrovnik in early 1992 are highlighted red.

In April 1992, the JNA renewed its offensive operations against the HV and the HVO near Kupres and Stolac in western and southern Herzegovina. The JNA's 2nd Military District, commanded by Colonel-General Milutin Kukanjac, deployed elements of the 5th Banja Luka Corps and the 9th Knin Corps to the Kupres area, capturing the town from the HV and the HVO jointly defending the area in the Battle of Kupres on 7 April 1992 and threatening Livno and Tomislavgrad to the south-west. The 4th Military District of the JNA, commanded by General Pavle Strugar, employed the 13th Bileća Corps and the 2nd Titograd Corps to capture Stolac and most of the eastern bank of the Neretva River south of Mostar. The JNA attacked Mostar with artillery and fighting around the city started on 6 April, and the Yugoslav Air Force attacked Široki Brijeg on 7–8 April. A Croatian attack on 9 April failed to capture a JNA-controlled airfield in Mostar. On 11 April, the Bosnian Serb Territorial Defence Force captured two nearby hydroelectric power plants on the Neretva River and the JNA pushed the HV/HVO force from Stolac. Čapljina, 25 kilometres (16 miles) south-west of Mostar, came under intermittent JNA artillery and air attacks. A ceasefire was arranged on 7 May, but the JNA and the Bosnian Serb forces resumed the attack the next day. The attack captured a large part of Mostar and some territory on the western bank of the Neretva River. On 12 May, JNA forces based in Bosnia and Herzegovina became part of the VRS.

Although the JNA planned the offensive to preempt a Croatian attack on Serb-held territory, Croatia saw the moves as a prelude to JNA attacks on southern Croatia, specifically aimed at the Port of Ploče and possibly Split. To counter the perceived threat, the HV deployed additional troops to the area, now designated the "Southern Front". HV General Janko Bobetko, appointed to lead the Southern Front, reorganized the HVO command structure and assumed control of its forces in the area to stop the expected JNA/VRS offensive and regain the lost territory. In late May, Bobetko launched an attack along the Adriatic coast and in its immediate hinterland, towards besieged Dubrovnik, linking up with the HV force in the city and ending its encirclement by the JNA on 1 June. The attack coincided with the JNA's withdrawal from the area towards Dubrovnik Airport in Konavle and to positions within the borders of Bosnia and Herzegovina. The border in this area is located 2 to 10 kilometres (1.2 to 6.2 miles) from the coast. On 23 May, the HV/HVO captured Hum Mountain south of Mostar.

Operation Jackal—also known as Operation June Dawns— commenced on 7 June 1992. The attacking HV/HVO force moved east and north from Čapljina towards Stolac and Mostar, aiming to push the VRS back from the Neretva River and capture positions around Mostar. As the VRS Herzegovina Corps positions around Tasovčići collapsed on 8 June, the HV/HVO advanced quickly in both of the planned directions. On 11 June, Mostar HVO forces attacked VRS positions on the western bank of the Neretva River south of Mostar in support of the main attack. The advance was immediately successful, gaining ground there, and in Mostar. On 12 June, no VRS forces remained on the western bank of the Neretva. By 15 June, the HV/HVO completed their capture of Stolac and the surrounding area, while the linkup of the HV/HVO forces approaching Mostar from the south, and those already in the city, was completed on 17 June. By 26 June, the HV/HVO advanced further eastwards along the slopes of Velež Mountain. Although the front lines did not move significantly to the east, Mostar was rendered relatively safe from future VRS attacks. On 10 June, in an operation codenamed Eagle 92 (Croatian: Orao 92), the HV tried to push VRS forces back from the high ground of Golubov Kamen, where the only road to Dubrovnik runs 700 metres (2,300 feet) from the national border, and inside Bosnia and Herzegovina, dominating over Dubrovnik. The attack was not sufficiently organized and it failed.

== Order of battle ==
The HV initially deployed 1,475 troops to conduct Operation Tiger. Although the VRS in the area had fewer troops, it had greater artillery firepower at its disposal and the advantage of defending in rugged terrain. Operation Tiger was executed by the HV's 1st Guards Brigade, reinforced with the special forces Zrinski Battalion, the 3rd Battalion of the 4th Guards Brigade, supported by the 163rd Infantry Brigade based in Dubrovnik, and additional HV troops brought in to hold positions captured by the guards brigades. Because of inefficient command structures in the reserve units, the HV's Southern Front command was forced to forge tactical groups out of multiple regular units. There was also a lack of manpower in individual reserve units because of their inadequately executed mobilization. To fend off any counter-attacks by the VRS Herzegovina Corps—specifically the 472nd Motorized Brigade stationed in the eastern Herzegovina—the positions captured by the 1st Guards Brigade were turned over to elements of the 115th Infantry Brigade, the 145th Infantry Brigade, the 148th Infantry Brigade, a battalion of the 156th Infantry Brigade and a company of the 102nd Infantry Brigade.

== Timeline ==
Following the HV's failed attempt to push the VRS further away from Dubrovnik in early June, Bobetko planned another effort to secure the city, codenamed Operation Tiger. Another effort to capture Golubov Kamen at the head of the Rijeka Dubrovačka embayment of the Adriatic Sea was made on 1 July. The initial attack, spearheaded by the 3rd Battalion of the 4th Guards Brigade, gained ground but the objective was not secured until 2 July, after VRS troops mounted a counter-attack. On the left flank of the 4th Guards Brigade, the 1st Guards Brigade—reinforced with special operations Zrinski Battalion—was tasked with capturing high ground on the southern rim of Popovo field. Their advance met stiff resistance and progressed slowly. By 10 July the 1st Guards Brigade reached its immediate objectives, consisting of numerous significant hills. By 13 July, it had covered approximately 17 kilometres (11 miles) in the Dubrovnik hinterland, from the villages of Greece and Visova to the road running through Srnjak village at the rim of Popovo field, north of Cavtat where their advance was halted.

As the guards brigades reached their objectives, the newly gained ground was gradually turned over to reserve HV units. The 163rd Infantry Brigade, defending Dubrovnik during the JNA siege, took over positions captured by the 4th Guards Brigade. The 1st Guards Brigade was relieved and its territorial gains were garrisoned by elements of the 115th Infantry Brigade, the 145th Infantry Brigade, the 148th Infantry Brigade, a battalion of the 156th Infantry Brigade and a company of the 102nd Infantry Brigade. The VRS counter-attacked the reserve infantry on 9 July, causing losses and the withdrawal of the 102nd Infantry Brigade company east of Zavala and the 115th Infantry Brigade from Zavala and Orahov Do. The retreat created a gap in the HV defences, threatening the town of Slano, but the 3rd Battalion of the 4th Guards Brigade closed it. Days later, the 148th Infantry Brigade conceded some of the offensive's gains to another VRS counter-attack near Bobani. On 13 July, a platoon drew from the 2nd Guards Brigade attempted to capture the Vlaštica Peak, but the attack failed, marking the end of Operation Tiger.

== Follow-up operations ==
=== Operation Liberated Land ===
Until 17 July, the VRS continued its attacks aimed at retaking territory lost in Operation Tiger, gradually pushing the HV back towards Dubrovnik. On 23 July, the HV 1st Guards Brigade counter-attacked north of Zaton, pushing the VRS north and east towards Popovo field. The attack, codenamed Operation Liberated Land (Croatian: Operacija Oslobođena zemlja), failed to cut off a battalion of the VRS 472nd Motorized Brigade deployed to Bobani, and the 4th Guards Brigade had to be deployed to mop up the area. Although substantial parts of the territory gained during the attack were surrendered to the VRS, the operation strengthened the HV defences in the area by 8 August.

=== Battle of Konavle ===
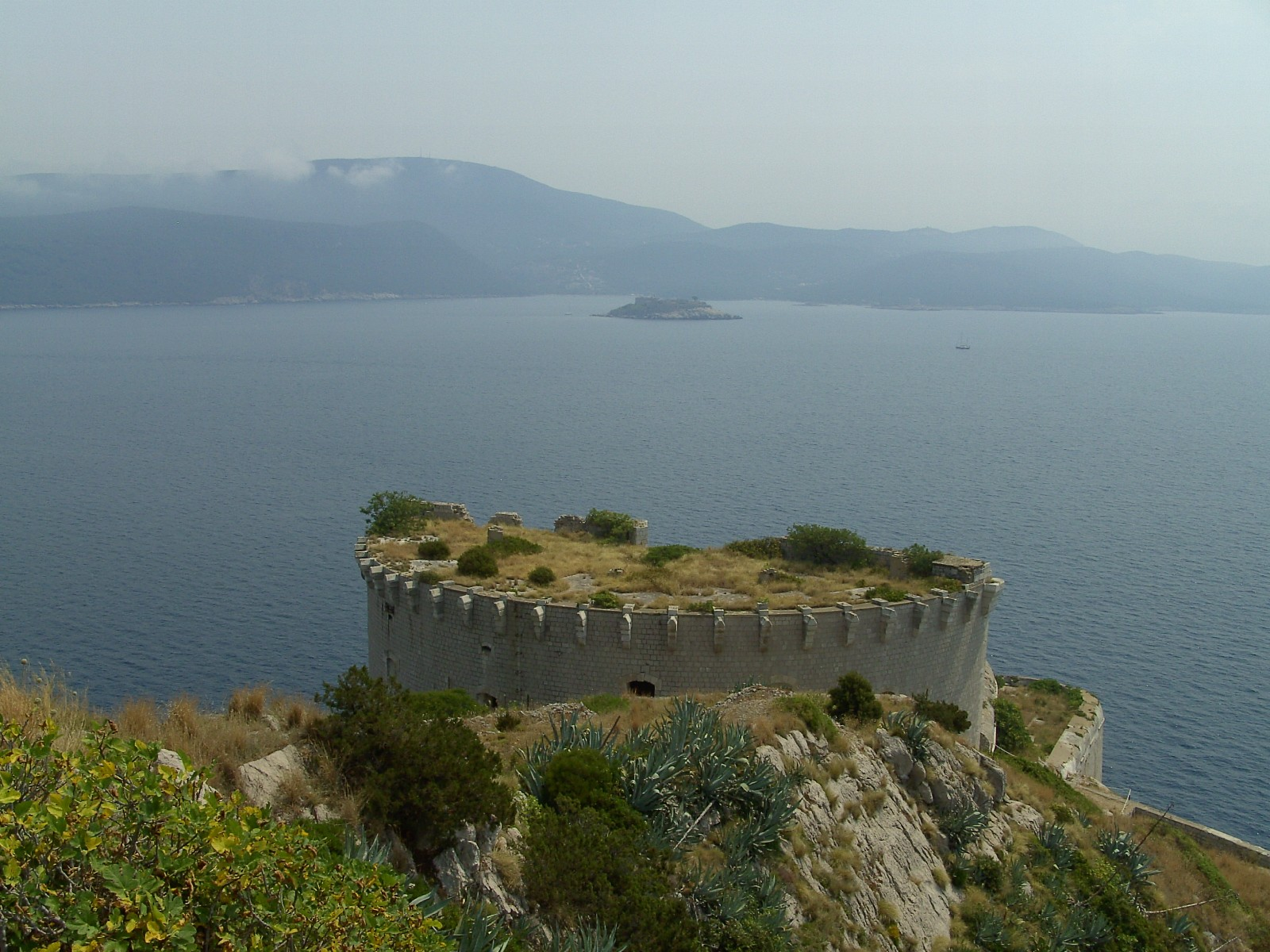
Prevlaka Fortress, overlooking the mouth of the Bay of Kotor

In late July 1992, the HV, the VRS and the JNA began talks on the withdrawal of the JNA from the Dubrovnik Airport and the Konavle region east of Dubrovnik towards the Bay of Kotor. The talks were mediated by representatives of the UN and the European Union (EU). The JNA's main concern was retaining control in the area, and specifically on the Prevlaka peninsula at the entrance of the Bay of Kotor. The strategic importance of the bay increased in 1992 because it contained the last remaining Yugoslav Navy base after it lost all its bases in Croatia. The talks soon halted because the military commanders involved had no authority to resolve the political issues under discussion. Another round of peace talks mediated by the UN and the EU, this time between Croatian President Franjo Tuđman and Yugoslav President Dobrica Ćosić, produced an agreement on the JNA pullout by 20 October in return for the UN-monitored demilitarization of the Prevlaka peninsula. The agreement specified the removal of the JNA from Konavle and a 15-kilometre (9.3 mi) buffer zone within Montenegro. The VRS began to plan to replace the JNA in the region, since the pullout would expose an unprotected flank of the VRS in Popovo field, and the HV planned to preempt the VRS move.

The JNA withdrew from the area as agreed, leaving Croatian soil by 8:30 pm on 20 October. However, it was replaced by the VRS on the high ground overlooking the low-lying coastal plateau containing Dubrovnik Airport and the town of Cavtat. On 20 October, two Croatian police boats carrying Croatian Minister of the Interior Ivan Jarnjak, the EU monitoring mission's Lieutenant General David Cranston and journalists docked in Cavtat, but the VRS fired mortars at them. Bobetko appointed Major General Nojko Marinović—commander of the HV during the siege of Dubrovnik—to perform a landing operation in the Cavtat area the same day. The first landing took place at 3:15 am on 21 October when the ferry Pelješćanka transported elements of the 5th Battalion of the 1st Guards Brigade to Cavtat. The amphibious operation was also supported by the ferries Postire and Blace which landed tanks, and other personnel-transporting craft. The 5th Battalion of the 1st Guards Brigade was joined that day by elements of the 1st and the 3rd Battalions of the same brigade. At 1:15 pm, the Pelješćanka was hit by VRS fire, but sustained only minor damage.

After landing in Cavtat, the HV moved towards the high ground to the north through Zvekovica and Uskoplje, east of Cavtat. The 1st Battalion of the 1st Guards Brigade first reached the VRS positions at Gradina Hill, which was quickly overrun and the battalion proceeded towards Jasenica, about 3 kilometres (1.9 miles) north-east of Cavtat, reaching the village by the afternoon. On 21 October, the 5th Battalion of the 1st Guards Brigade took positions in Stravča and Duba villages adjacent to the Croatia–Bosnia and Herzegovina border in the north of the region, while the special police moved to the villages of Dubravka and Karasovići in the east of Konavle near the Yugoslav border. The 3rd Battalion of the 1st Guards Brigade advanced towards Čilipi and Gruda along the Adriatic Highway running through the centre of Konavle. The 2nd Battalion of the 1st Guards Brigade entered the area to secure the Dubrovnik—Plat road connecting the region with the rest of Croatia. In the afternoon, the HV deployed a battalion of reserve infantry drawn from Dubrovnik Home Guard, and on 23 October, the 156th Infantry Brigade was deployed to relieve the 1st Guards Brigade troops protecting the national border.

=== Operation Vlaštica ===
On 22 October, as the HV neared completion of the operations to secure Konavle, the 4th Guards Brigade and the 163rd Infantry Brigade moved north-east from Dubrovnik and attacked the VRS positions closest to the city. The main HV attack, assigned to the 3rd and the 5th Battalions of the 4th Guards Brigade, was directed to capture Vlaštica Peak. The 1st Battalion and an independent armoured-mechanized company of the 4th Guards Brigade were deployed to draw off some of the VRS defences as they attacked towards the village of Cerovac and Hum railway station. The 163rd Infantry Brigade supported the main axis of the operation, advancing from Župa Dubrovačka towards Vlaštica. By 26 October, the VRS left flank in Popovo field collapsed and the town of Trebinje, the main Bosnian Serb centre in the region, came into jeopardy. However, Tuđman gave way to international pressure to halt the military operations around Dubrovnik and the fighting stopped by 1 November 1992.

== Aftermath ==
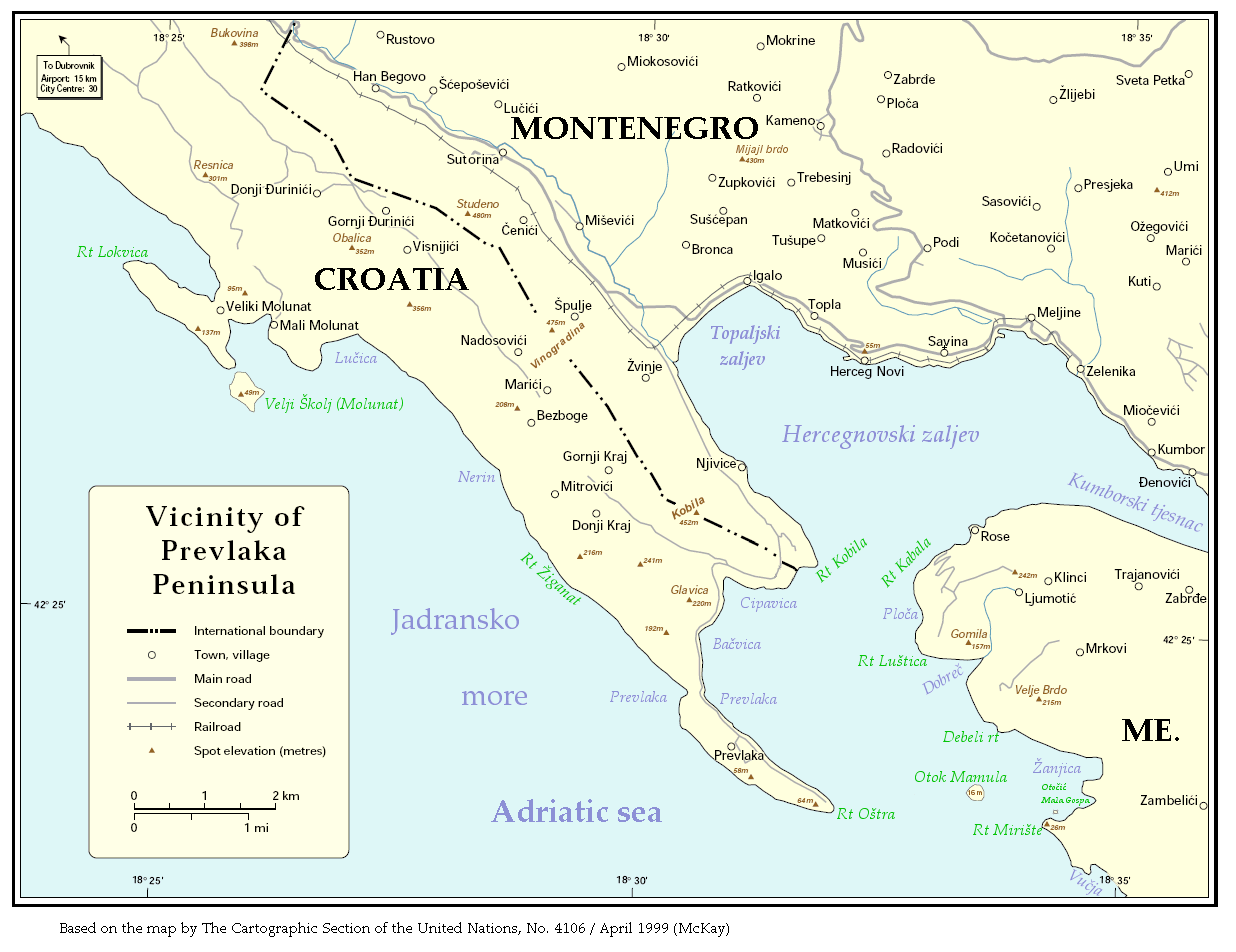
Croatia–Montenegro border at Prevlaka in the Bay of Kotor area

Operation Tiger captured only 40 square kilometres (15 square miles) of territory around Dubrovnik, but it created a buffer zone around the city which increased its security. It also improved the security of the Ploče–Dubrovnik section of the Adriatic Highway—especially at Golubov Kamen and Rijeka Dubrovačka—allowing the safer resupply of Dubrovnik. The subsequent negotiated withdrawal of the JNA from Konavle and the HV's rapid capture of the region before the VRS could move in, and other offensive operations in the Dubrovnik hinterland secured a Croatian strategic victory. The entire region of southern Dalmatia was brought under Croatian control, the siege of Dubrovnik was lifted and the city's safety was largely improved by the end of October 1992. However, that part of Croatia continued to suffer intermittent VRS artillery attacks until after Operation Storm in August 1995.

In the wake of the 1995 Split Agreement and the large-scale deployment of the HV to Bosnia and Herzegovina, the HV General Staff planned to attack and capture a large part of eastern Herzegovina. The attack—codenamed Operation Burin—was formally ordered on 3 September 1995, and the HVO and the ARBiH were scheduled to join the attack. The operation was postponed on 17 September, but on 7 November was again ordered to be carried out should the Dayton peace talks fail. The plan was cancelled in early December 1995.

The Tuđman–Ćosić agreement on the pullout of JNA troops from Konavle provoked an emotional response in Yugoslavia, where it was interpreted as a defeat and betrayal. Following the agreement, the Prevlaka Peninsula was demilitarized and placed under the United Nations Mission of Observers in Prevlaka (UNMOP), established by the UN Security Council Resolution 779 of 6 October 1992. The resolution placed the peninsula under the control of the UNPROFOR. The UN Security Council Resolution 981 transferred control to the newly established United Nations Confidence Restoration Operation in Croatia on 31 March 1995, and then to UNMOP through the UN Security Council Resolution 1038 of 15 January 1996. The UN mission there expired two months later. As of February 2013, the Prevlaka Peninsula remains demilitarized, with Croatian and Montenegrin police jointly patrolling the sea. The border in the area remains disputed between Croatia and Montenegro.
