= Pasjača =

Pasjača can refer to:

- Pasjača (Prokuplje), village in Serbia
- Pasjača (Niš), village
- Pasjača (mountain), mountain in Serbia
- Pasjača Beach, a short narrow shoreline in Konavle, Croatia
