= Sokol (Konavle) =

Medieval fortress in Konavle, Croatia

Fortress Sokol
- Utvrda Sokol grad
- Dunave, Konavle, Croatia
- Fortress Sokol (2017)

Site information
- Type: Fortress
- Owner: Society of Friends of Dubrovnik Antiquities (since 1970)
- Condition: Restored (2007–2013); open to visitors

Location
- Location within Croatia
- Coordinates: 42.542°N 18.409°E

Site history
- Built: before 1373
- Built for: Zahumlje, Republic of Ragusa
- In use: 14th–17th century
- Materials: Limestone

Cultural Good of Croatia
- Official name: Utvrda Sokol grad
- Type: Protected cultural good
- Reference no.: Z-1616

Sokol (Croatian: Sokol grad; lit. 'Falcon'), also known as Sokol kula, is a medieval fortress in Dunave, Dubrovnik-Neretva County, Croatia. It lies in the Konavle region beneath the eastern slopes of Sniježnica, near the border with Montenegro. First recorded in 1373, it is described as the largest single fortress of the Republic of Ragusa. The fortress is protected as a cultural good of the Republic of Croatia. Restored between 2007 and 2013, it is today open to visitors.

== History ==
Arthur J. Evans is known to have excavated the site but never published complete results. Archaeological surveys since the 1970s have shown that the site was inhabited in the Eneolithic, Bronze and Iron Ages, most notably by the Cetina culture. It was also inhabited in Roman times, and grew in importance as part of a Byzantine limes.

It is not known exactly when the medieval fortress was built. It is first recorded in 1373, and is mentioned again in 1391 in the donation of Konavle by the Sanković family to the Republic of Ragusa. The fortress of the Bosnian nobility passed definitively to Ragusa in 1420, with its purchase of Konavle. From then on the Republic continually extended, reinforced, armed and maintained it, and it was garrisoned by Ragusan troops under the command of a member of the gentry.

The fortress survived the 1667 Dubrovnik earthquake, but it is no longer mentioned in the Ragusan archives after 1672, and is thought to have been abandoned at that time. As was common with abandoned fortifications, local people took its stone to build houses and walls, leaving it largely dismantled.

In 1970 the Society of Friends of Dubrovnik Antiquities bought the fortress from the Church. After restoration works lasting from 2007 to 2013, it was reopened to visitors in April 2013.

The site also contains a medieval stećak necropolis and a Glagolitic marble inscription.

== Description ==
The fortress stands on a natural rock rising more than 25 metres (82 ft) above the surrounding terrain, and its irregular plan follows the shape of the rock. From this position it overlooked the Konavle field and an important road leading from the hinterland towards Dubrovnik.

== Gallery ==

Entrance to the fortress

Coats of arms in the fortress

== Sources ==
- Topić, Nikolina; Bedić, Željka; Vyroubal, Vlasta; Šlaus, Mario; Barešić, Jadranka; Sironić, Andreja; Iklić, Mato; Moore, Andrew M. T.; Drašković Vlašić, Nikolina (2019). "Inventory of Finds and Multiphase Cemetery by Fort Sokol in Konavle". Archaeologia Adriatica. 13 (1). University of Zadar. ISSN 1848-9281.
