= Drvenik =

Drvenik may mean:

- Drvenik, Split-Dalmatia County, village near Makarska, Croatia
- Drvenik, Dubrovnik-Neretva County, village in Konavle, Croatia
- Drvenik Veli, island in central Dalmatia, Croatia
- Drvenik Veliki, settlement on Drvenik Veli
- Drvenik Mali, island in central Dalmatia, Croatia
