= Uskoplje =

Uskoplje may refer to:

- Gornji Vakuf-Uskoplje, a town in Bosnia and Herzegovina
- Uskoplje, Ravno, a village near Trebinje, Bosnia and Herzegovina
- Uskoplje, Croatia, a village in Konavle, Croatia
- Uskoplje, a region in medieval Bosnia
