= Pridvorje =

Pridvorje may refer to:

- Pridvorje, Dubrovnik-Neretva County, a village in Konavle, Croatia
- Pridvorje, Osijek-Baranja County, a village near Drenje, Croatia
