= Mikulići =

- Village
- Location within Croatia
- Coordinates: 42.477016°N 18.3972941°E
- Country: Croatia
- County: Dubrovnik-Neretva County
- Municipality: Konavle

Area
  - Total: 1.9 sq mi (5.0 km^{2})

Population (2021)
  - Total: 66
  - Density: 34/sq mi (13/km^{2})
- Time zone: UTC+1 (CET)
  - Summer (DST): UTC+2 (CEST)

Mikulići is a village in Croatia, in Konavle municipality.

== Demographics ==
According to the 2021 census, its population was 66.
