= Komaji =

- Village
- Location within Croatia
- Coordinates: 42.5368199°N 18.2850355°E
- Country: Croatia
- County: Dubrovnik-Neretva County
- Municipality: Konavle

Area
  - Total: 3.1 sq mi (7.9 km^{2})

Population (2021)
  - Total: 268
  - Density: 88/sq mi (34/km^{2})
- Time zone: UTC+1 (CET)
  - Summer (DST): UTC+2 (CEST)

Komaji is a village in Croatia, in Konavle municipality.

== Demographics ==
According to the 2021 census, its population was 268.
