= Molunat =

- Village
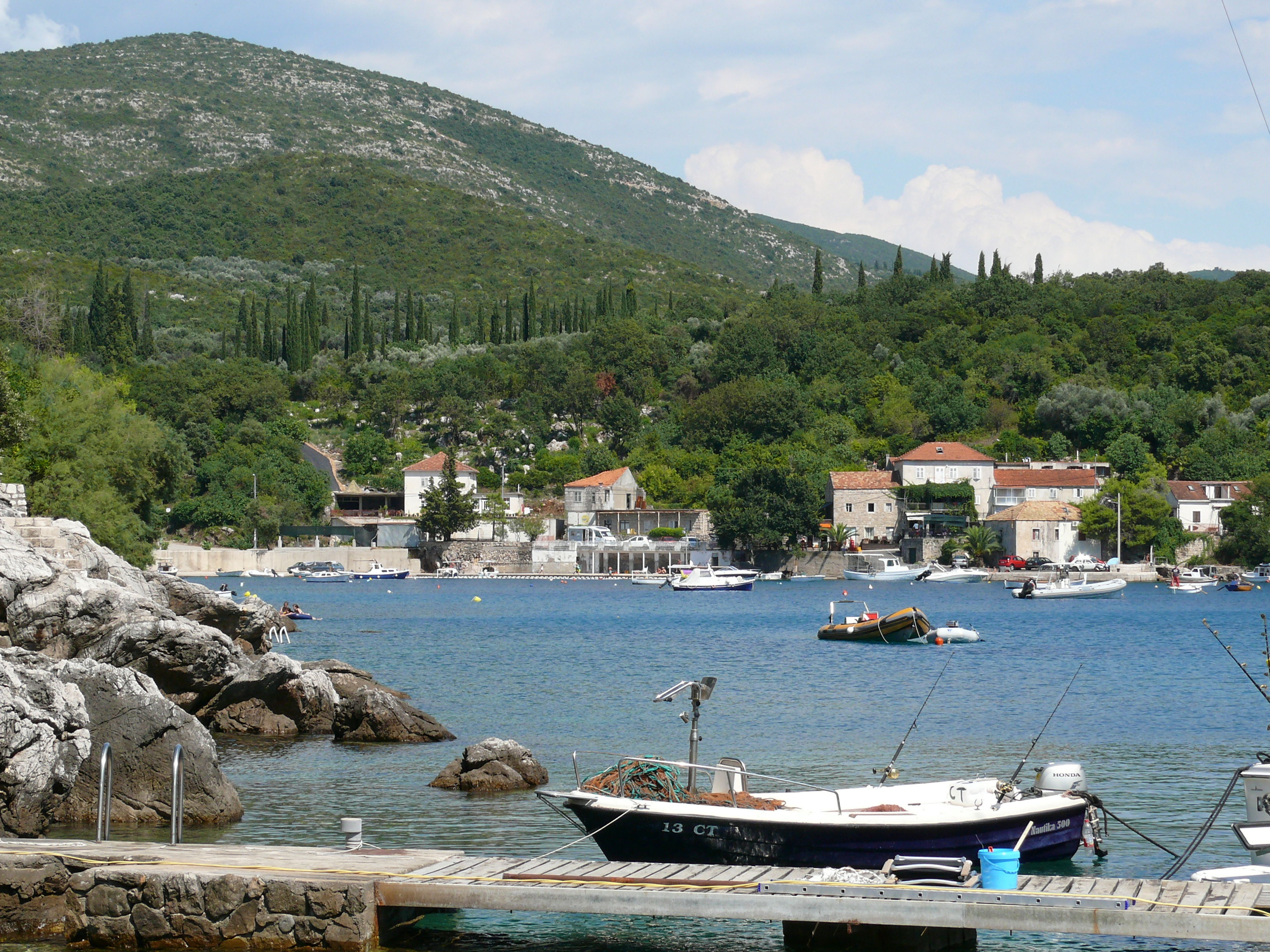
- Mountain Bay, Croatia

- Location within Croatia
- Coordinates: 42.4590932°N 18.4126713°E
- Country: Croatia
- County: Dubrovnik-Neretva County
- Municipality: Konavle

Area
  - Total: 2.2 sq mi (5.7 km^{2})

Population (2021)
  - Total: 234
  - Density: 110/sq mi (41/km^{2})
- Time zone: UTC+1 (CET)
  - Summer (DST): UTC+2 (CEST)

Molunat is a village in Croatia, in Konavle municipality.

== Climate ==
From 1998 to 2014, the highest temperature recorded at the local weather station was 35.6 °C (96.1 °F), on 24 July 2007. The coldest temperature was −5.4 °C (22.3 °F), on 13 February 2004.

== Demographics ==
According to the 2021 census, its population was 234.
