= Brotnice =

- Village
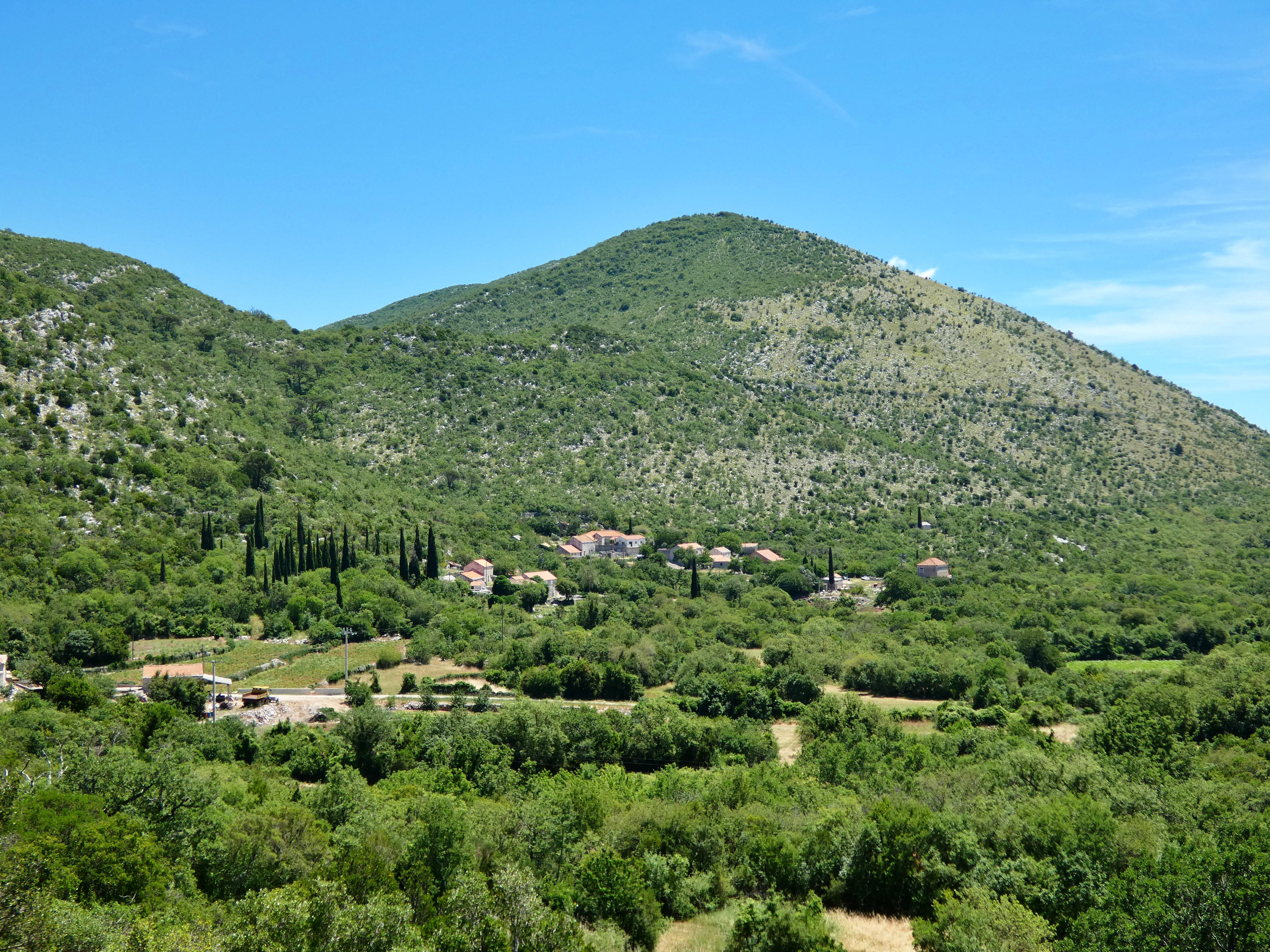

- Location within Croatia
- Coordinates: 42.5893814°N 18.2671295°E
- Country: Croatia
- County: Dubrovnik-Neretva County
- Municipality: Konavle

Area
  - Total: 2.1 sq mi (5.5 km^{2})

Population (2021)
  - Total: 29
  - Density: 14/sq mi (5.3/km^{2})
- Time zone: UTC+1 (CET)
  - Summer (DST): UTC+2 (CEST)

Brotnice is a village in Croatia, in Konavle municipality.

== Demographics ==
According to the 2021 census, its population was 29.
