= Duba Konavoska =

- Village

- Location within Croatia
- Coordinates: 42.5924615°N 18.3135543°E
- Country: Croatia
- County: Dubrovnik-Neretva County
- Municipality: Konavle

Area
  - Total: 7.3 sq mi (18.9 km^{2})

Population (2021)
  - Total: 68
  - Density: 9.3/sq mi (3.6/km^{2})
- Time zone: UTC+1 (CET)
  - Summer (DST): UTC+2 (CEST)

Duba Konavoska is a village in Croatia, located close to the border with Bosnia and Herzegovina, in Konavle municipality.

== History ==
During the Homeland War, Duba was occupied by the JNA and Chetnik units, and the village was almost completely destroyed, looted and burned.

== Demographics ==
According to the 2021 census, its population was 68.
