= Dunave =

- Village
- Location within Croatia
- Coordinates: 42.5578944°N 18.3581195°E
- Country: Croatia
- County: Dubrovnik-Neretva County
- Municipality: Konavle

Area
  - Total: 5.0 sq mi (12.9 km^{2})

Population (2021)
  - Total: 147
  - Density: 29.5/sq mi (11.4/km^{2})
- Time zone: UTC+1 (CET)
  - Summer (DST): UTC+2 (CEST)

Dunave is a village in Croatia, in Konavle municipality.

It is the location of the Sokol Fort.

== Demographics ==
According to the 2021 census, its population was 147.
