= Mihanići =

- Village
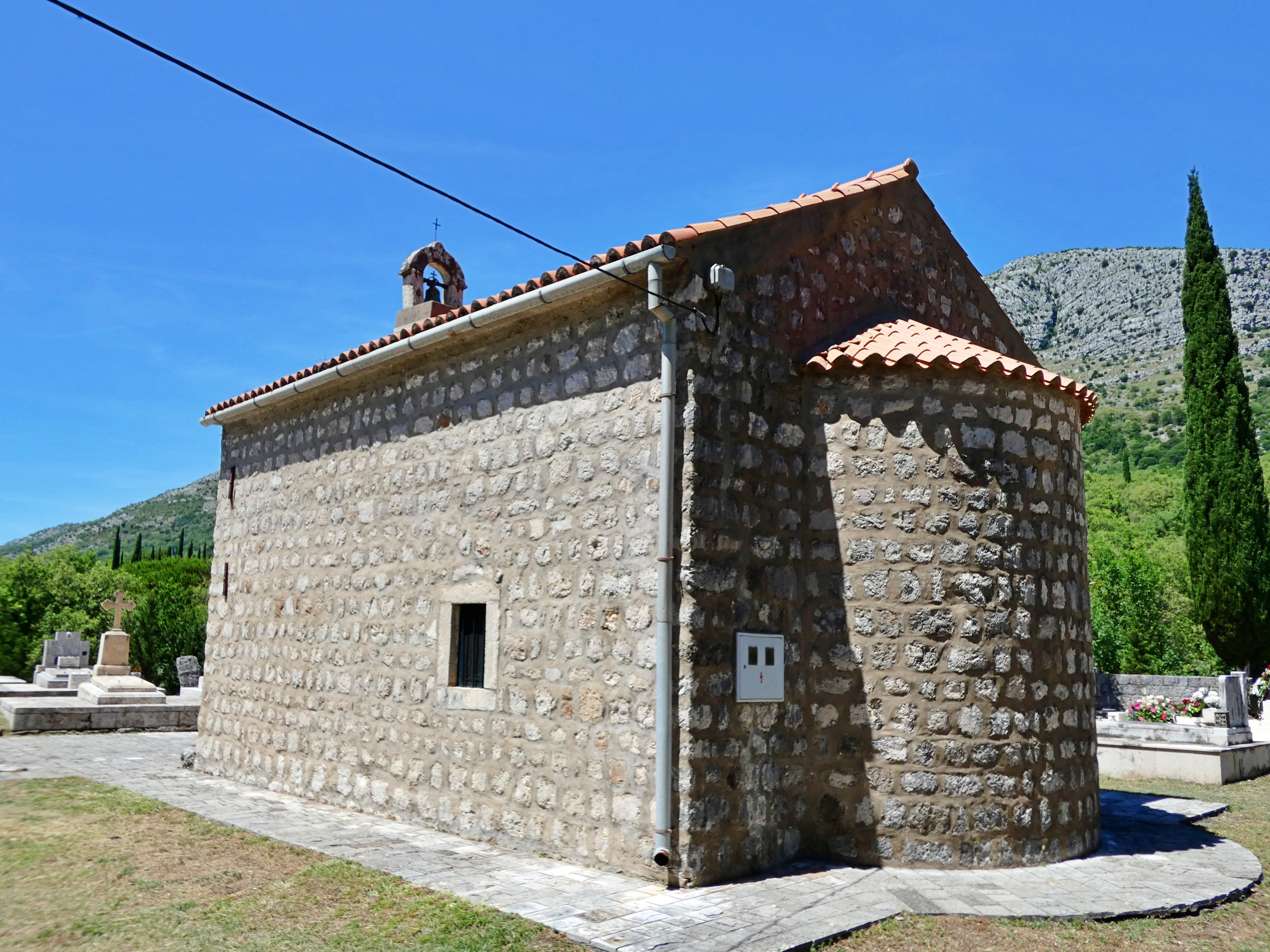
- Church of St. Michael in Mihanići

- Location within Croatia
- Coordinates: 42.5596138°N 18.3060615°E
- Country: Croatia
- County: Dubrovnik-Neretva County
- Municipality: Konavle

Area
  - Total: 1.6 sq mi (4.1 km^{2})

Population (2021)
  - Total: 109
  - Density: 69/sq mi (27/km^{2})
- Time zone: UTC+1 (CET)
  - Summer (DST): UTC+2 (CEST)

Mihanići is a village in Croatia, in Konavle municipality.

== Demographics ==
According to the 2021 census, its population was 109.
