= Stravča =

- Village
- Location within Croatia
- Coordinates: 42.5944689°N 18.2829617°E
- Country: Croatia
- County: Dubrovnik-Neretva County
- Municipality: Konavle

Area
  - Total: 4.4 sq mi (11.3 km^{2})

Population (2021)
  - Total: 54
  - Density: 12/sq mi (4.8/km^{2})
- Time zone: UTC+1 (CET)
  - Summer (DST): UTC+2 (CEST)

Stravča is a village in Croatia, in Konavle municipality.

== Demographics ==
According to the 2021 census, its population was 54.
