= Močići =

- Village
- Location within Croatia
- Coordinates: 42.5619298°N 18.2288951°E
- Country: Croatia
- County: Dubrovnik-Neretva County
- Municipality: Konavle

Area
  - Total: 2.3 sq mi (5.9 km^{2})

Population (2021)
  - Total: 426
  - Density: 190/sq mi (72/km^{2})
- Time zone: UTC+1 (CET)
  - Summer (DST): UTC+2 (CEST)

Močići is a village in Croatia, in Konavle municipality.

== Demographics ==
According to the 2021 census, its population was 426.

== Archaeology ==
A Roman-era sanctuary associated with the cult of Mithras lies in the karst hills on the outskirts of the village. It was described by archaeologist Arthur Evans in 1883, and has not been fully excavated. A study published in 2026 documented its layout using photogrammetry.

The sanctuary is located in a natural limestone hollow with a spring, adjoining an open clearing approximately 14 metres (46 ft) across. Nine steps cut into the rock descend toward the grotto; a further set leads into the clearing. Above the grotto is a carved relief, measuring roughly 0.75 metres (2.5 ft) by 1.10 metres (3.6 ft), showing a bull-slaying Mithras, accompanied by figures and animals customary in Mithraic imagery. A second, badly damaged relief has usually been identified as Silvanus, although an identification as one of Mithras's torchbearers has also been proposed.

The date at which the sanctuary was used remains unknown, and it can only be placed broadly within the period when Mithras worship became widespread in the empire, from the 2nd to the mid-4th century AD. Roman pottery and roof tiles, some stamped during the reign of Tiberius (r. 14–37 AD), have been reported about 600 metres (2,000 ft) south of the site. They may indicate a nearby villa, and Wilson and McCarty consider it most likely that the sanctuary belonged to one of the villa estates. A date in the 4th century AD proposed elsewhere rests on coinage from a nearby mithraeum and is not secure.

This site may provide an unusual example of an open-air Mithraic sanctuary. In 2026, archaeologists Ian S. Wilson and Matthew McCarty suggested that the clearing is the most probable setting for gatherings of worshippers, rather than the grotto. The grotto provides only about 17.7 square metres (191 sq ft) of floor area and offers a poor view of the Mithras relief, whereas the clearing provides approximately 120 square metres (1,300 sq ft) and faces the carving. They also found no evidence of roofing (though a light structure remains possible).
