= Radovčići =

- Village
- Location within Croatia
- Coordinates: 42°30′45″N 18°20′33″E
- Country: Croatia
- County: Dubrovnik-Neretva County
- Municipality: Konavle

Area
  - Total: 2.2 sq mi (5.7 km^{2})

Population (2021)
  - Total: 187
  - Density: 85/sq mi (33/km^{2})
- Time zone: UTC+1 (CET)
  - Summer (DST): UTC+2 (CEST)

Radovčići is a village in Croatia, in Konavle municipality.

== Demographics ==
According to the 2021 census, its population was 187. It was 228 in 2011.
