= Pasjača Beach =

Beach in Croatia

- Beach
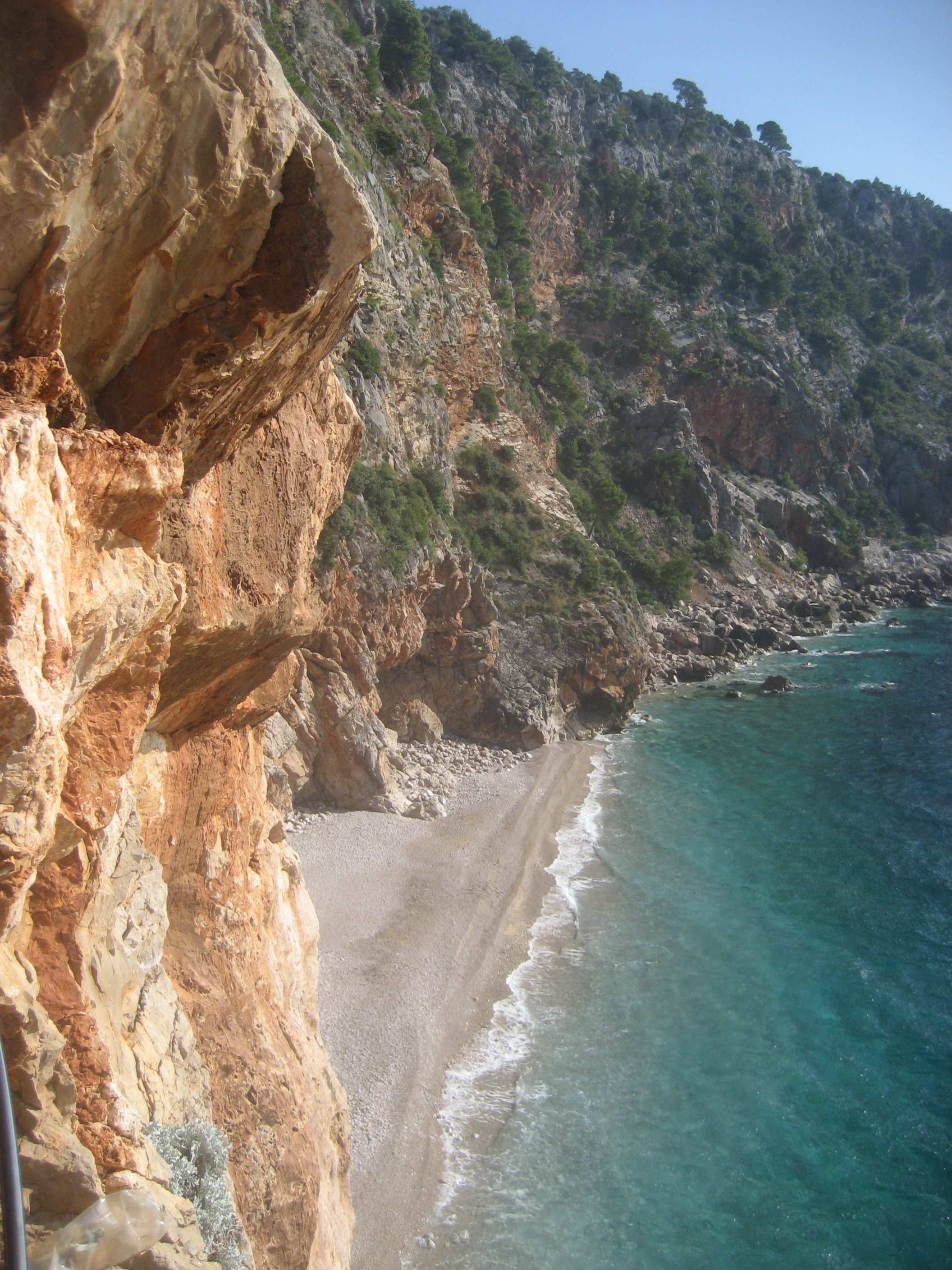
- Pasjača Beach viewed from the cliff

- Coordinates: 42.5134°N 18.3206°E
- Location: Konavle, Croatia
- Offshore water bodies: Adriatic Sea

Dimensions
  - Length: 80 meters
  - Width: 10 meters
- sand, gravel

Pasjača Beach (pronounced ['pʌsɪ̯ʌʧʌ]) is a small, hidden sand and gravel beach in Konavle region, southern Croatia. It is situated below the Konavle cliffs where it meets the Adriatic Sea forming a narrow sandy-gravelly coastal strip of unique and wonderful beauty.

== Location ==
Pasjača is located approximately 30 kilometres far from Dubrovnik, one of the most prominent and most visited tourist destinations in the Mediterranean Sea, a seaport and the centre of Dubrovnik-Neretva County. Cavtat, the seat of Konavle, is about 12 km away. There is an asphalted road from Cavtat to Popovići, a village close to the beach, as well as a parking space for up to 50 cars. A narrow path then leads steeply downwards from the cliffs to the beach.

== Features ==
The beach is small, narrow, mostly sandy and gravelly, with some rocks in the shallow sea. It is approximately 80 meters long and 10 meters wide on the average. The turquoise sea water is limpid and crystal clear. Remote and difficult to access, Pasjača is a paradise for nature lovers, hikers and adventurers and less appropriate for elderly or disabled people and families with small children.

There are no beach facilities or any structures on Pasjača (toilet, kiosk, market stall, shower, changing stall etc.) and therefore guests have to take everything (food, drink, deckchairs...) with them or prepare for Robinson tourism.

== History ==
Pasjača was formed in the middle of the 20th century. When building a tunnel, the excavated stone material was thrown into the sea from the edge of the 200-meter-high cliff. In only a few years, the waves of the Adriatic Sea transformed the stones into a beach filled with fine sand. As the sea water later slowly carried the sand away, the stone material was replaced and the aesthetic was preserved.

== See also ==
- Nugal Beach
- Sahara Beach
- Zlatni Rat
- List of social nudity places in Europe

== Gallery ==
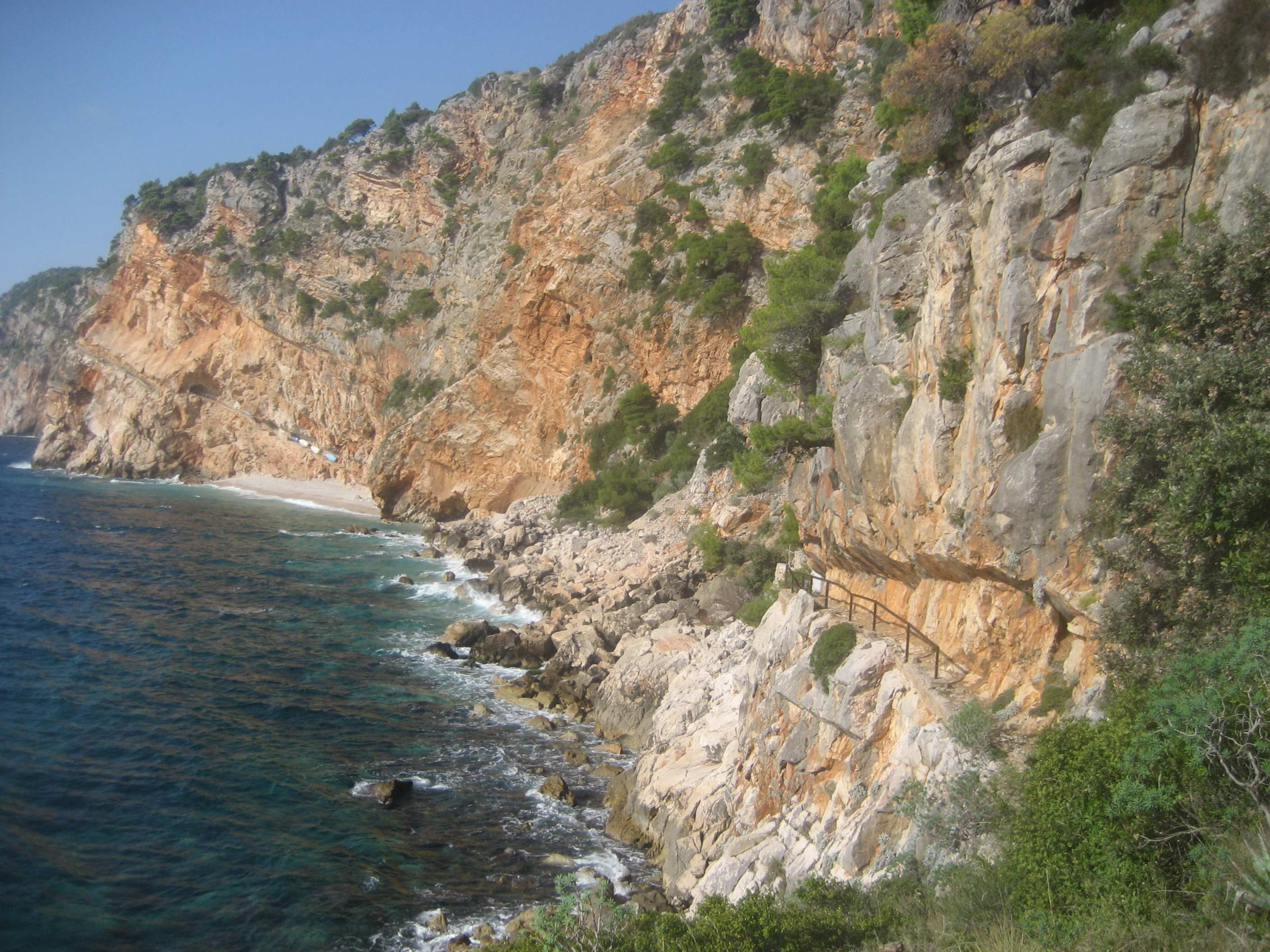
Konavle cliffs with Pasjača in the background

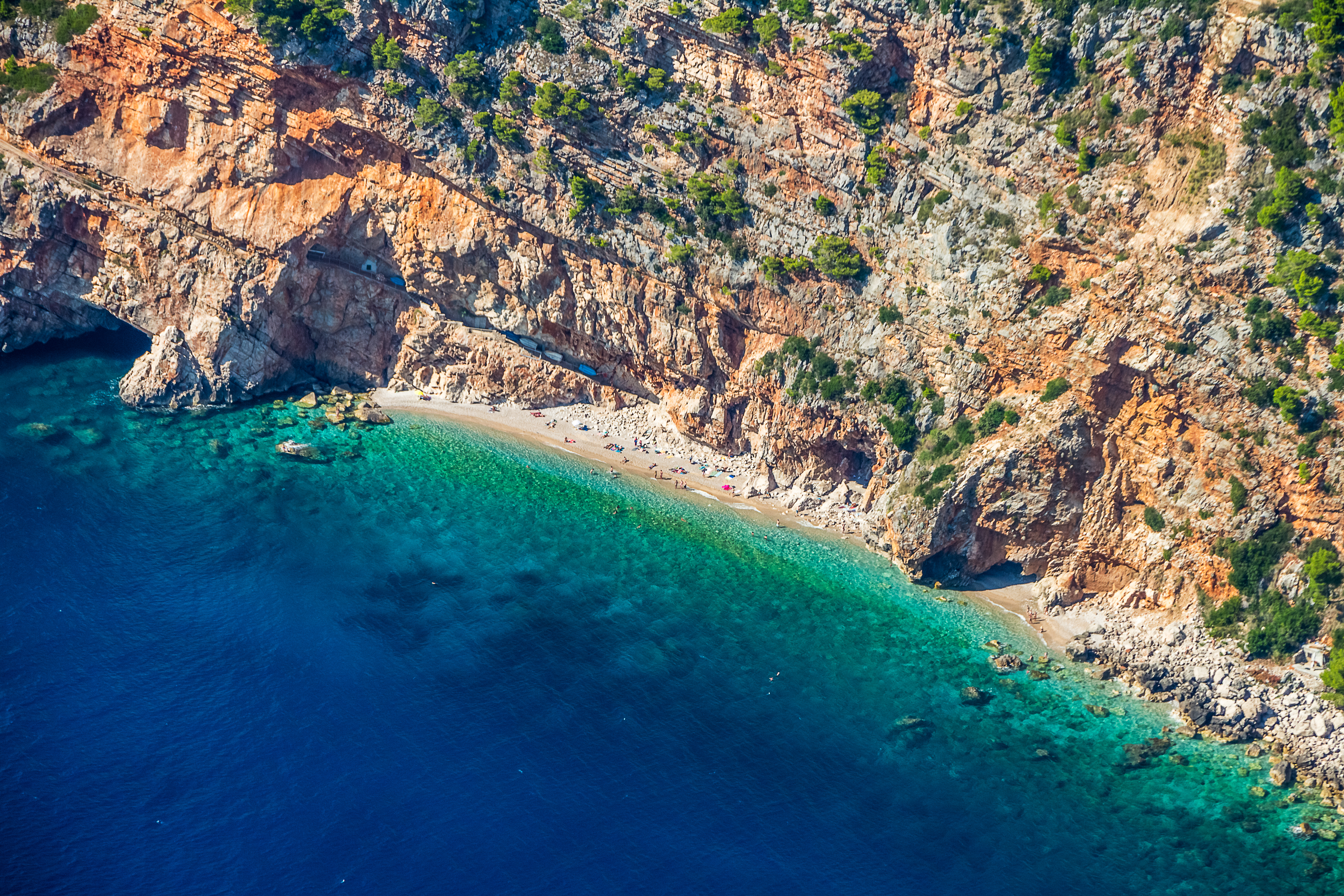
Aerial view

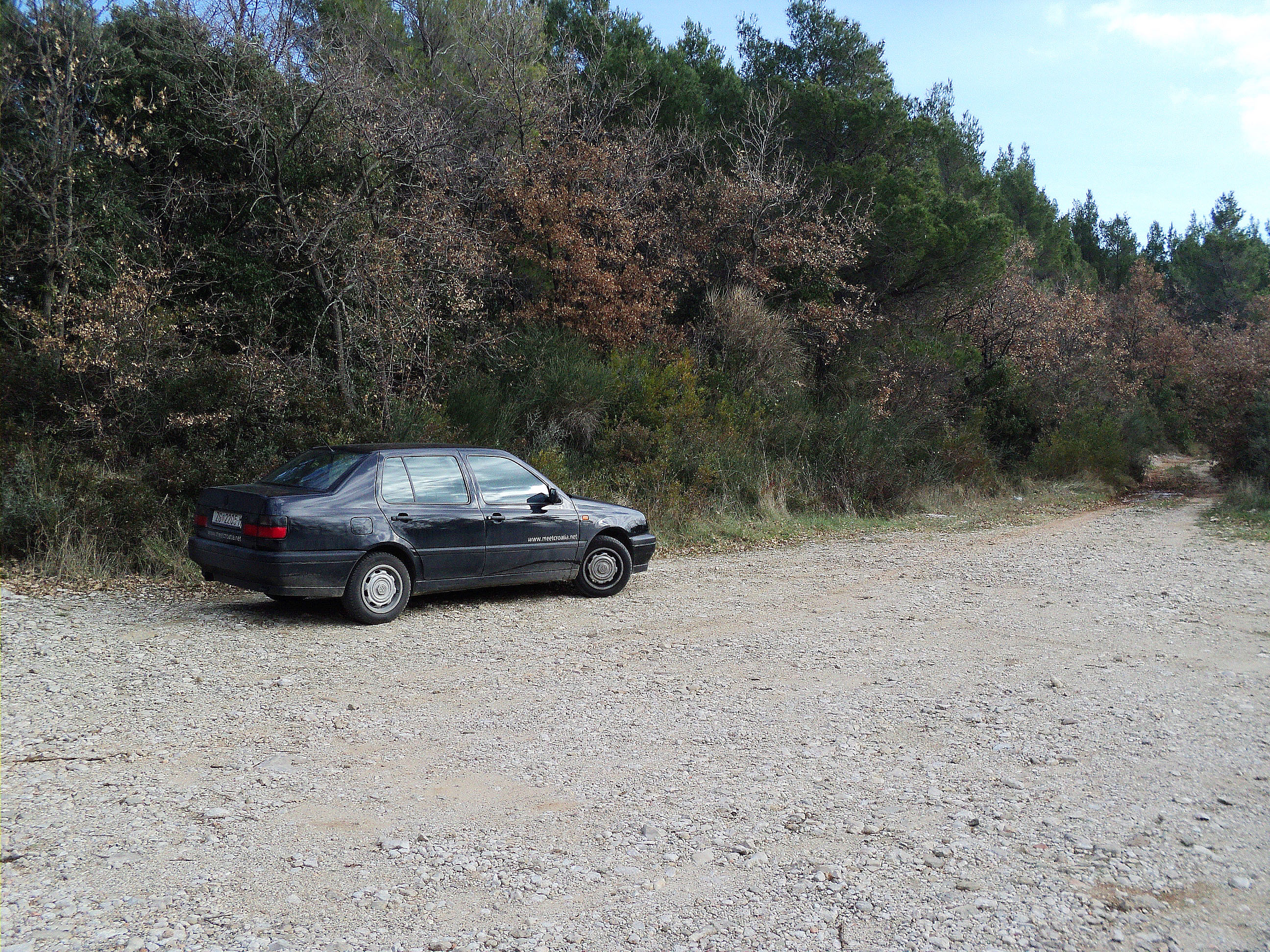
Parking space

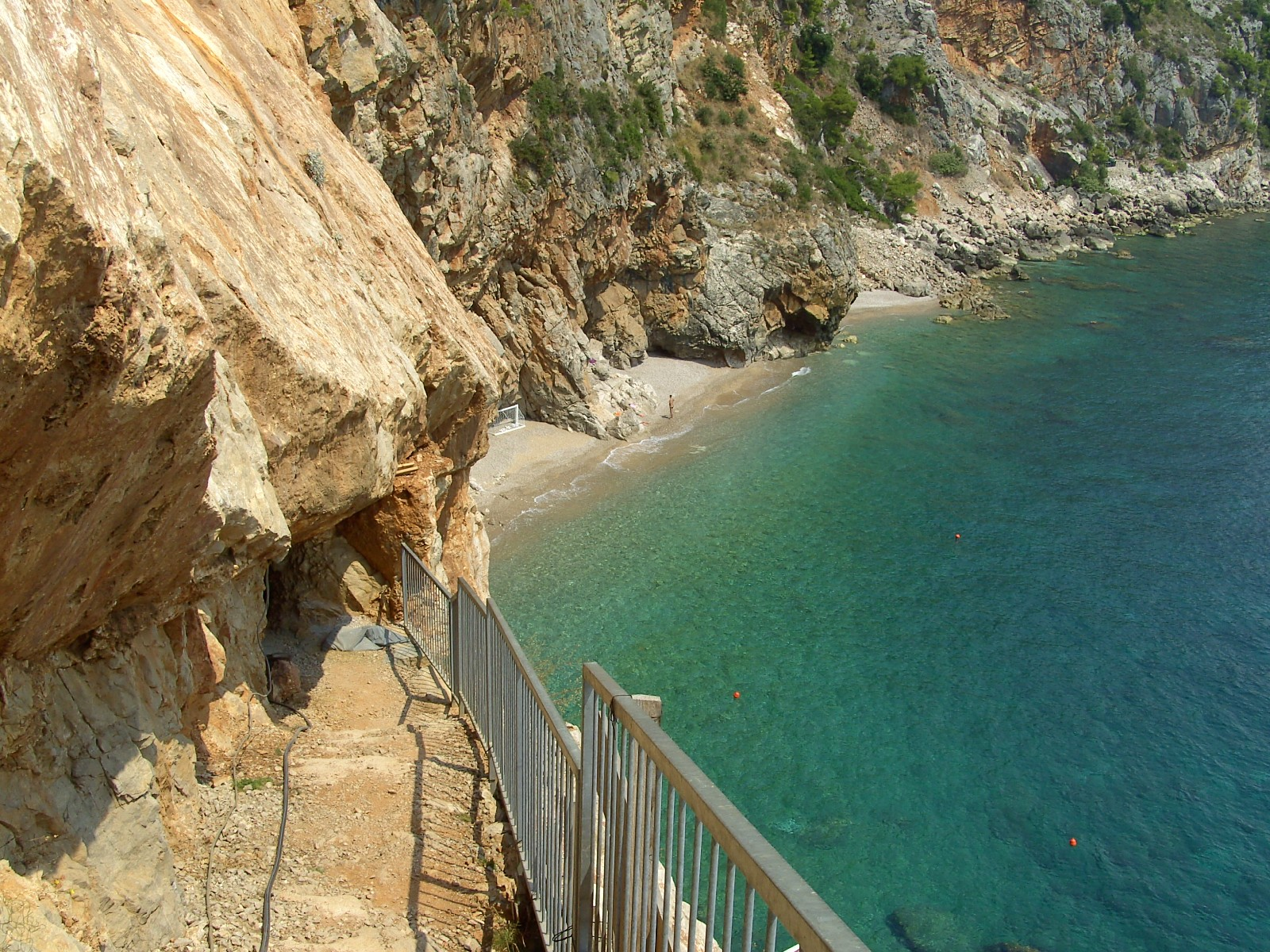
View from the narrow path leading downwards
