= Palje Brdo =

- Village
- Location within Croatia
- Coordinates: 42.5033838°N 18.392255°E
- Country: Croatia
- County: Dubrovnik-Neretva County
- Municipality: Konavle

Area
  - Total: 1.9 sq mi (4.8 km^{2})

Population (2021)
  - Total: 134
  - Density: 72/sq mi (28/km^{2})
- Time zone: UTC+1 (CET)
  - Summer (DST): UTC+2 (CEST)

Palje Brdo is a village in Croatia, in Konavle municipality.

== Demographics ==
According to the 2021 census, its population was 134.
