= Poljice, Dubrovnik-Neretva County =

Poljice
- Village
- Location within Croatia
- Coordinates: 42.4906705°N 18.361408°E
- Country: Croatia
- County: Dubrovnik-Neretva County
- Municipality: Konavle

Area
  - Total: 2.4 sq mi (6.3 km^{2})

Population (2021)
  - Total: 55
  - Density: 23/sq mi (8.7/km^{2})
- Time zone: UTC+1 (CET)
  - Summer (DST): UTC+2 (CEST)

Poljice is a village in Croatia, in Konavle municipality.

== Demographics ==
According to the 2021 census, its population was 55.
