= Vodovađa =

- Village
- Location within Croatia
- Coordinates: 42.5122972°N 18.4095023°E
- Country: Croatia
- County: Dubrovnik-Neretva County
- Municipality: Konavle

Area
  - Total: 2.4 sq mi (6.2 km^{2})

Population (2021)
  - Total: 190
  - Density: 79/sq mi (31/km^{2})
- Time zone: UTC+1 (CET)
  - Summer (DST): UTC+2 (CEST)

Vodovađa is a village in Croatia, in Konavle municipality.

== Demographics ==
According to the 2021 census, its population was 190.
