= Gabrili =

- Village
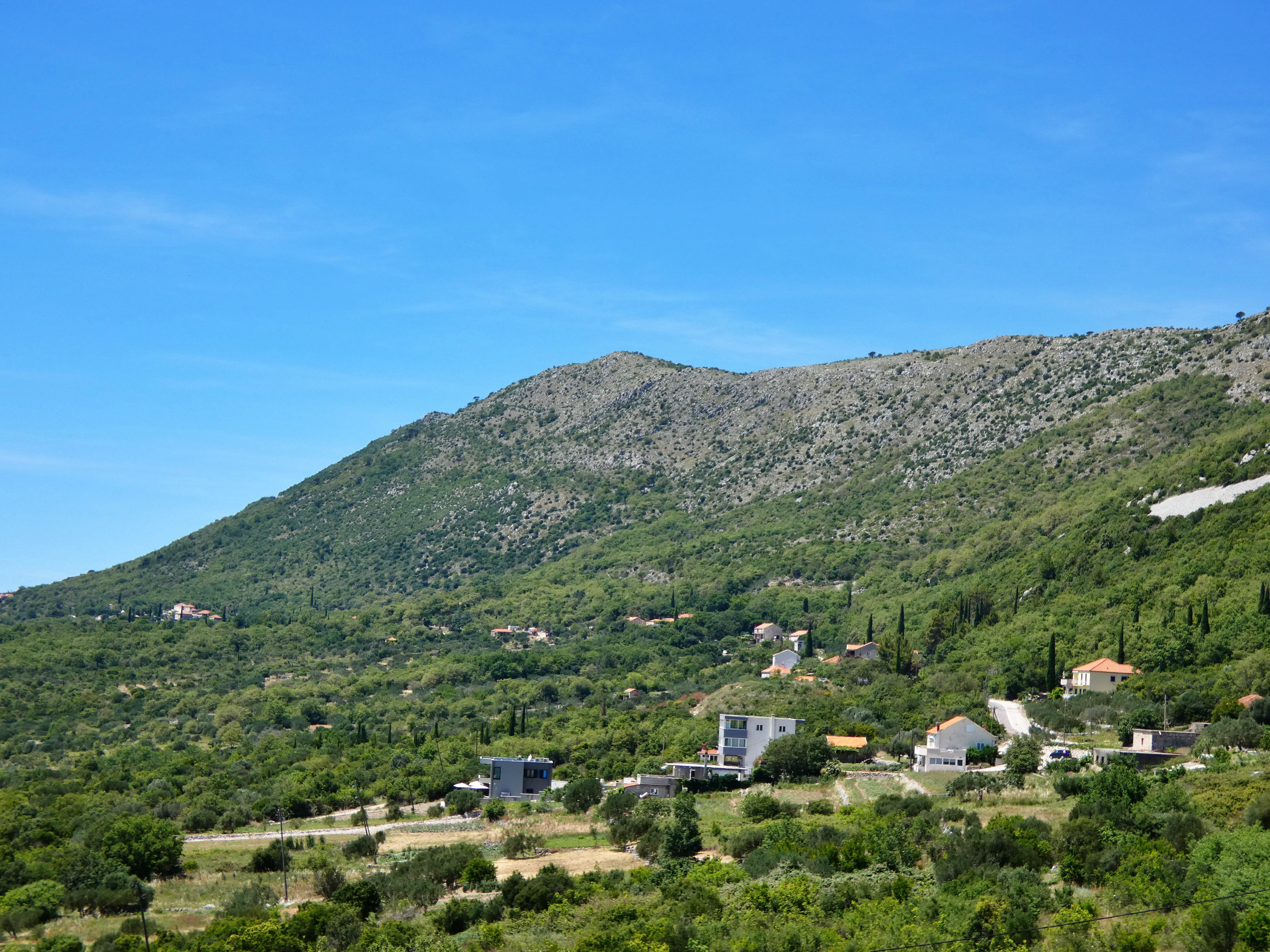

- Location within Croatia
- Coordinates: 42.5699196°N 18.2788642°E
- Country: Croatia
- County: Dubrovnik-Neretva County
- Municipality: Konavle

Area
  - Total: 1.7 sq mi (4.5 km^{2})

Population (2021)
  - Total: 204
  - Density: 120/sq mi (45/km^{2})
- Time zone: UTC+1 (CET)
  - Summer (DST): UTC+2 (CEST)

Gabrili is a village in Croatia., in the region of Konavle.

== Demographics ==
According to the 2021 census, its population was 204.
