= Čilipi =

- Village
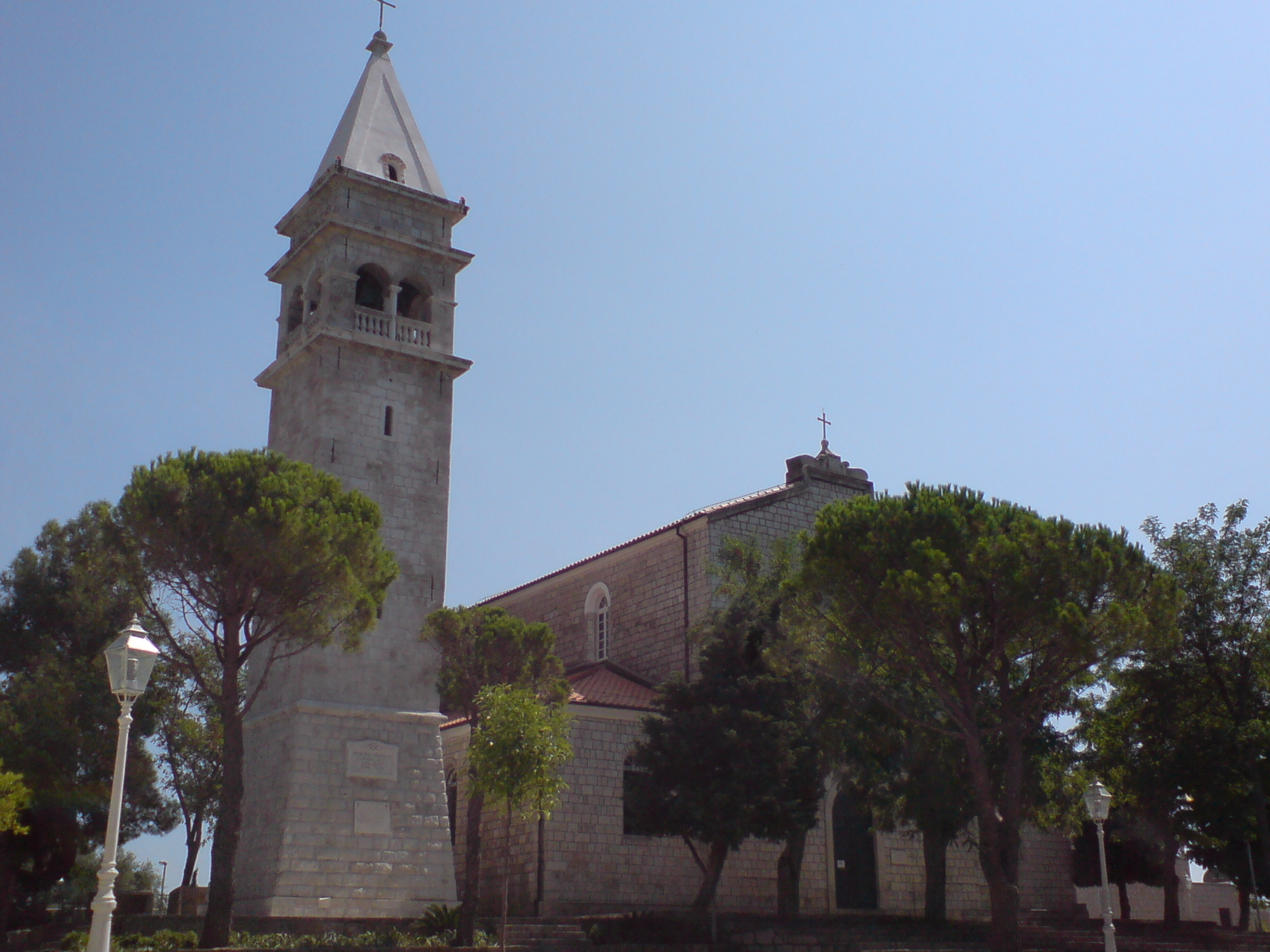

- Location within Croatia
- Coordinates: 42°33′11″N 18°16′34″E
- Country: Croatia
- County: Dubrovnik-Neretva County
- Municipality: Konavle

Area
  - Total: 4.1 sq mi (10.7 km^{2})

Population (2021)
  - Total: 970
  - Density: 230/sq mi (91/km^{2})
- Time zone: UTC+1 (CET)
  - Summer (DST): UTC+2 (CEST)
- Postal code: 20213 Čilipi

Čilipi is a village located in the municipality of Konavle, 22 km southeast from the town of Dubrovnik, in southern Croatia. It is connected by the D8 state road.

Čilipi gives its name to nearby Dubrovnik Airport.

== Climate ==
Since records began in 1981, the highest temperature recorded at the local weather station was 39.5 °C (103.1 °F), on 24 July 2007. The coldest temperature was −7.4 °C (18.7 °F), on 8 January 2017.

== Demographics ==
According to the 2021 census, its population was 970. It was 933 in 2011.
