= Gruda, Croatia =

Gruda
- Village
- Location within Croatia
- Coordinates: 42°31′00″N 18°22′00″E
- Country: Croatia
- County: Dubrovnik-Neretva County
- Municipality: Konavle

Area
  - Total: 2.9 sq mi (7.5 km^{2})

Population (2021)
  - Total: 860
  - Density: 300/sq mi (110/km^{2})
- Time zone: UTC+1 (CET)
  - Summer (DST): UTC+2 (CEST)
- Postal code: 20215 Gruda

Gruda is a village in Dubrovnik-Neretva County, southern Dalmatia, Croatia, in Konavle municipality. It is on the D8 highway, near the tripoint of Croatia, Bosnia-Herzegovina and Montenegro.

== Demographics ==
According to the 2021 census, its population was 860. It was 753 in 2001.
