= Zvekovica =

- Village
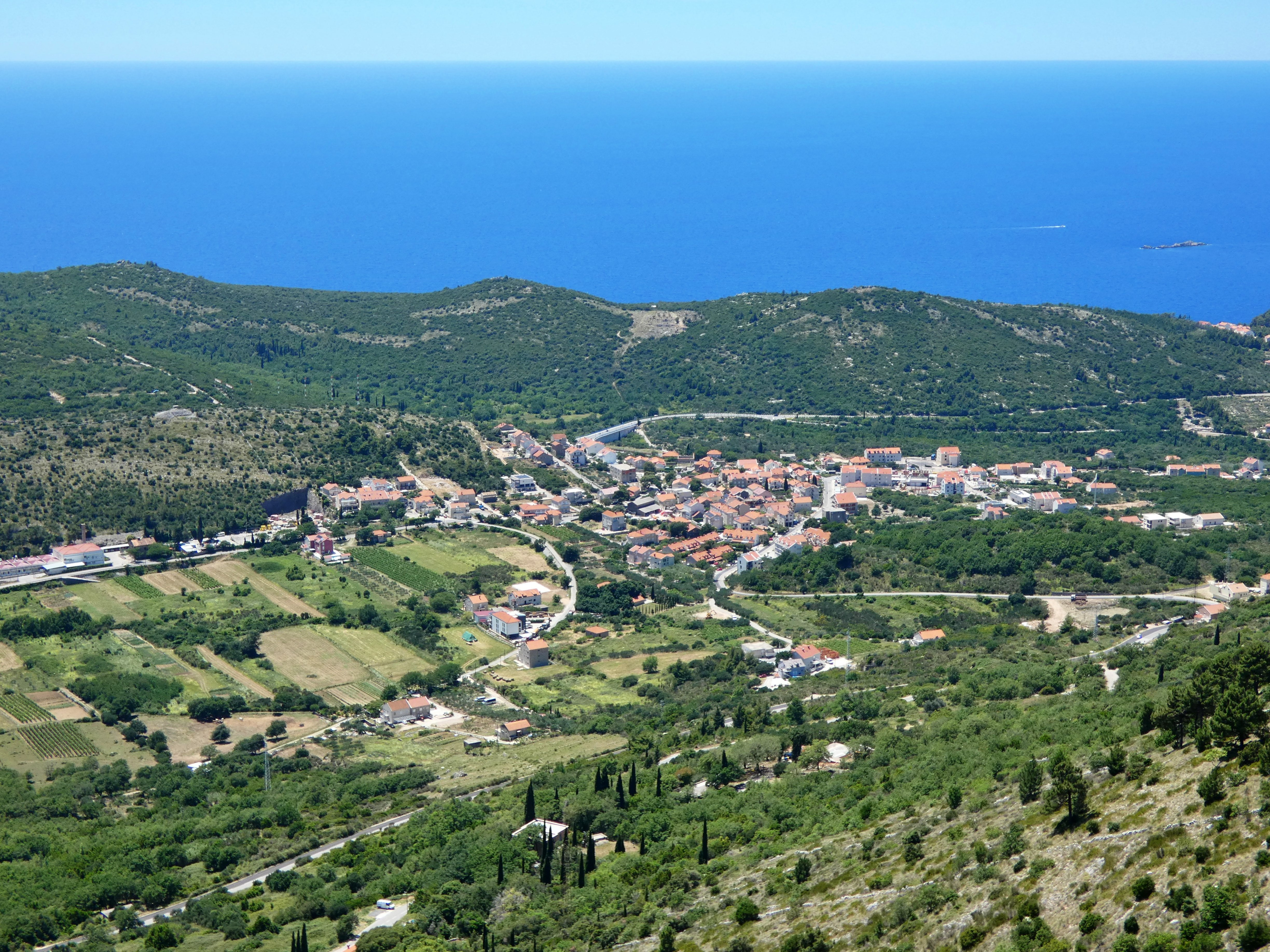
- Zvekovica

- Location within Croatia
- Coordinates: 42°34′37″N 18°14′24″E
- Country: Croatia
- County: Dubrovnik-Neretva County
- Municipality: Konavle

Area
  - Total: 0.35 sq mi (0.9 km^{2})

Population (2021)
  - Total: 710
  - Density: 2,000/sq mi (790/km^{2})
- Time zone: UTC+1 (CET)
  - Summer (DST): UTC+2 (CEST)
- Postal code: 20210 Cavtat

Zvekovica is a village in southern Croatia, in the municipality of Konavle within Dubrovnik-Neretva County. It is connected by the D8 state road.

== Demographics ==
According to the 2021 census, its population was 710. It was 570 in 2011.
