= Drvenik, Dubrovnik-Neretva County =

Drvenik
- Village
- Location within Croatia
- Coordinates: 42.5637595°N 18.301243°E
- Country: Croatia
- County: Dubrovnik-Neretva County
- Municipality: Konavle

Area
  - Total: 0.89 sq mi (2.3 km^{2})

Population (2021)
  - Total: 40
  - Density: 45/sq mi (17/km^{2})
- Time zone: UTC+1 (CET)
  - Summer (DST): UTC+2 (CEST)

Drvenik is a village in Croatia, in Konavle municipality.

== Demographics ==
According to the 2021 census, its population was 40.
