= Popovići, Dubrovnik-Neretva County =

Popovići
- Village
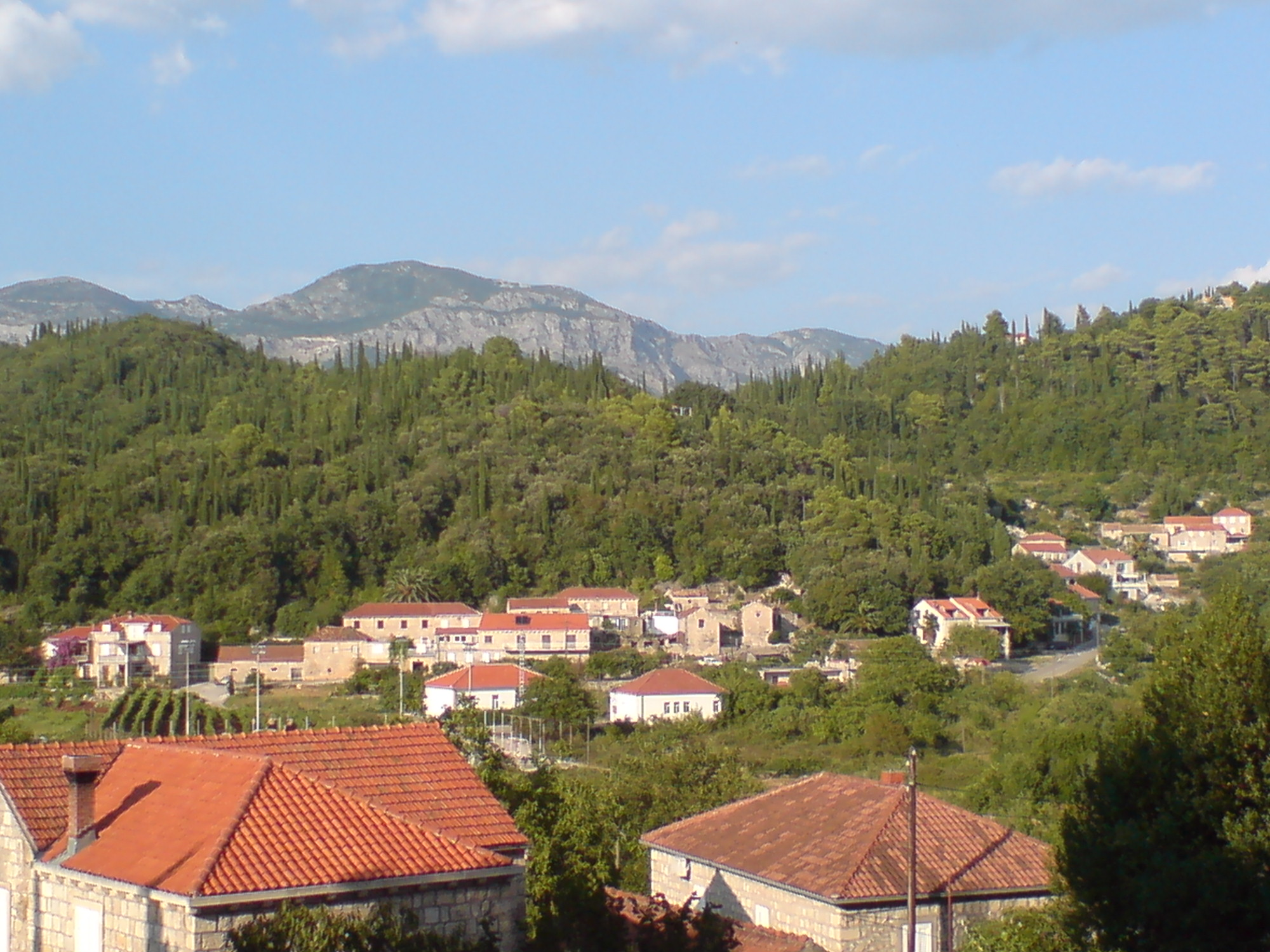
- Interactive map of Popovići
- Location within Croatia
- Coordinates: 42.5250996°N 18.301151°E
- Country: Croatia
- County: Dubrovnik-Neretva County
- Municipality: Konavle

Area
  - Total: 2.1 sq mi (5.5 km^{2})

Population (2021)
  - Total: 221
  - Density: 100/sq mi (40/km^{2})
- Time zone: UTC+1 (CET)
  - Summer (DST): UTC+2 (CEST)

Popovići is a village in Croatia, in Konavle municipality.

== Demographics ==
According to the 2021 census, its population was 221.
