= Dubravka, Croatia =

Dubravka
- Village
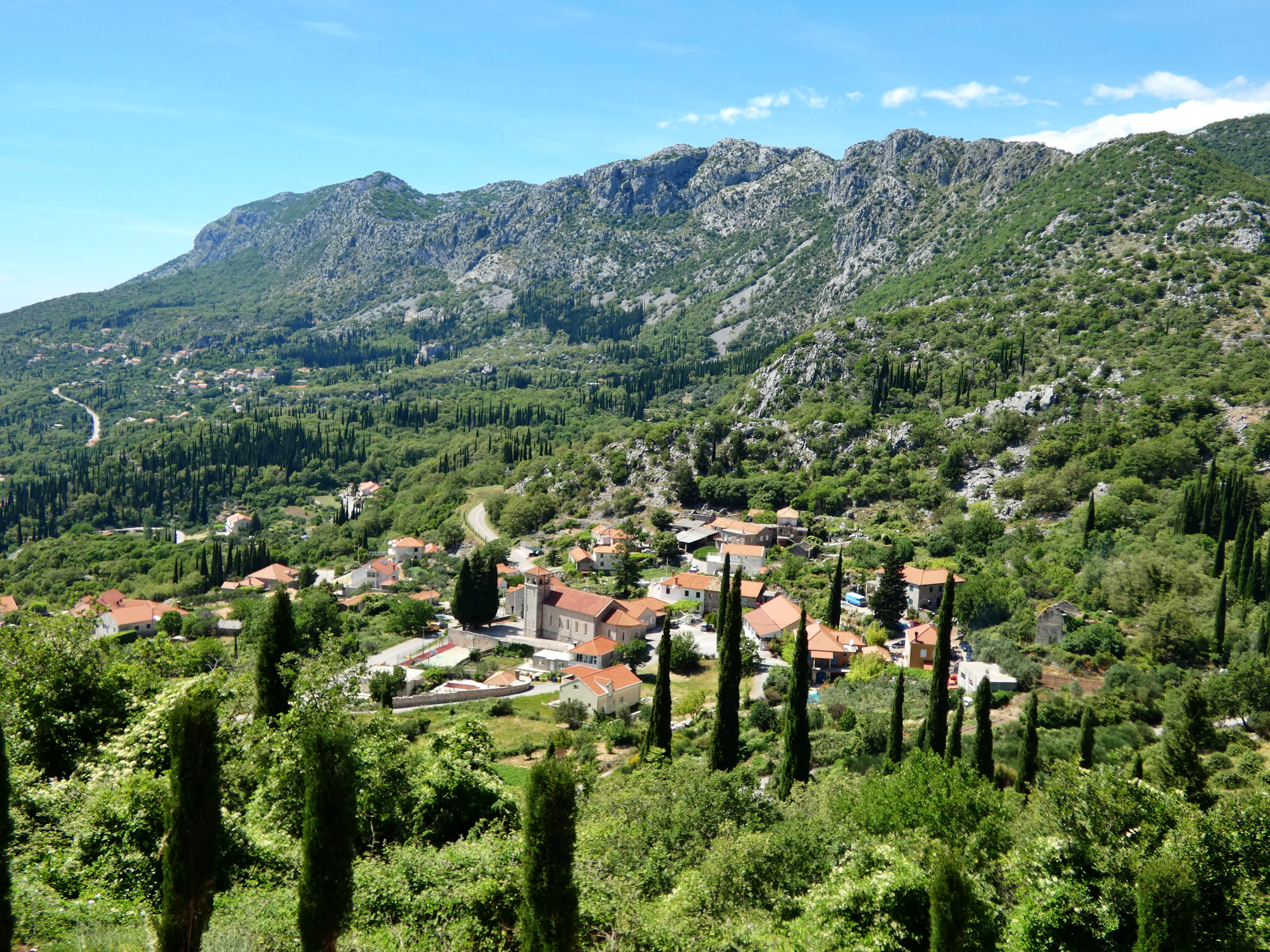

- Location within Croatia
- Coordinates: 42.53528°N 18.42444°E
- Country: Croatia
- County: Dubrovnik-Neretva County
- Municipality: Konavle

Area
  - Total: 3.6 sq mi (9.4 km^{2})

Population (2021)
  - Total: 261
  - Density: 72/sq mi (28/km^{2})
- Time zone: UTC+1 (CET)
  - Summer (DST): UTC+2 (CEST)

Dubravka is a village in Croatia, located close to the border with Montenegro, in Konavle municipality.

== Demographics ==
According to the 2021 census, its population was 261.
