= Pasjača (Prokuplje) =

Pasjača Пасјача (Serbian)
- Village
- Location within Serbia
- Coordinates: 43°08′30″N 21°37′22″E
- Country: Serbia
- District: Toplica District
- Municipality: Prokuplje

Population (2002)
  - Total: 35
- Time zone: UTC+1 (CET)
  - Summer (DST): UTC+2 (CEST)

Pasjača is a village in the municipality of Prokuplje, Serbia.

== Population ==
According to the 2002 census, the village has a population of 35 people.
