= Sniježnica (mountain in Croatia) =

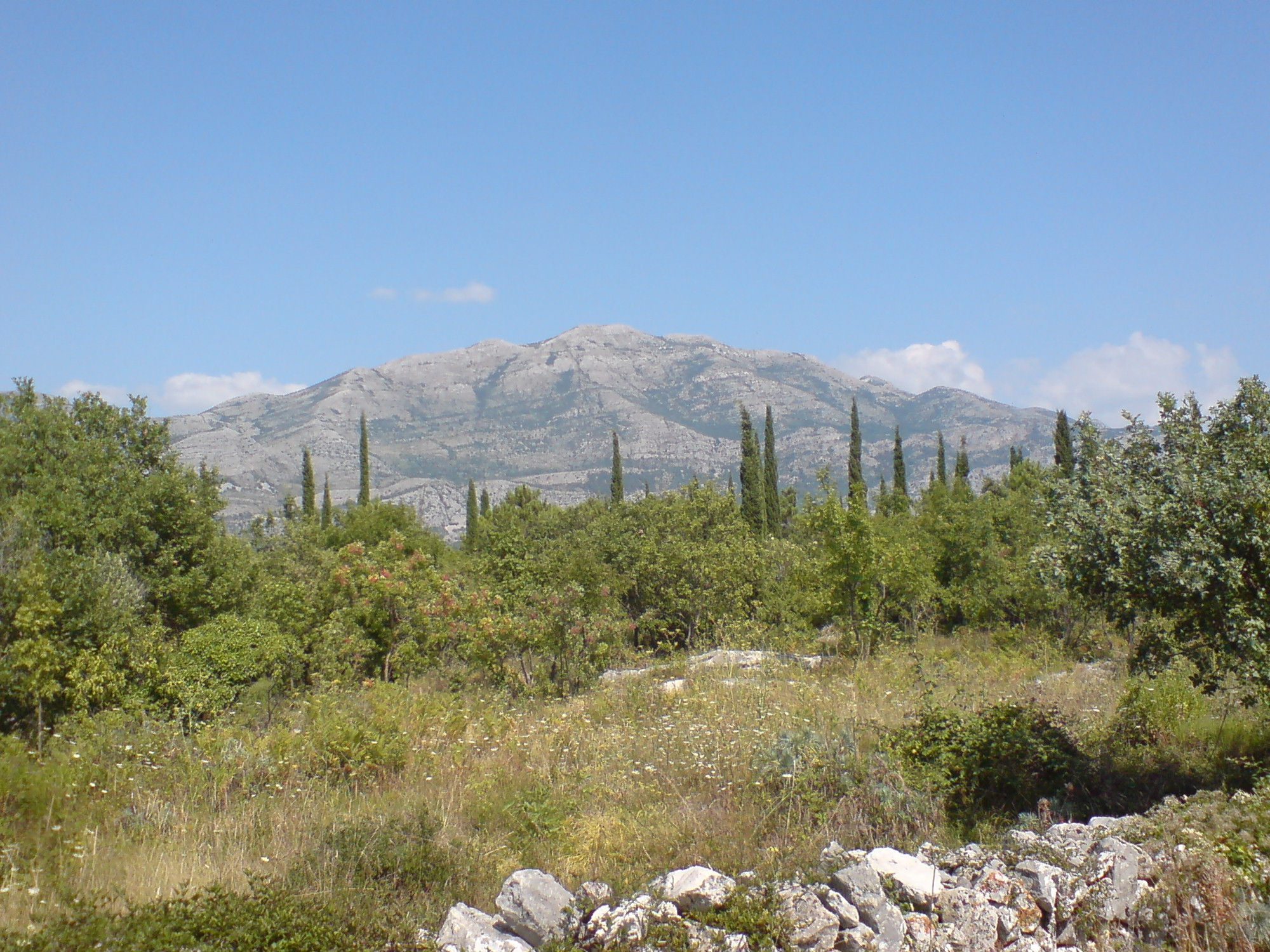
- View of Snježnica mountain in Konavle near Dubrovnik, Croatia

Highest point
- Elevation: 1,234 m (4,049 ft)
- Coordinates: 42°34′N 18°21′E

Geography
- Location within Croatia

Sniježnica is a mountain located in the southernmost part of Croatia, north of the Konavle region. The eponymous highest peak is 1,234 metres (4,049 ft).

== Bibliography ==
=== Biology ===
- Šašić, Martina; Nahirnić, Ana; Tarmann, Gerhard M. (2016-12-31). "Zygaenidae (Lepidoptera) in the Lepidoptera collections of the Croatian Natural History Museum". Natura Croatica: Periodicum Musei Historiae Naturalis Croatici. 25 (2): 233–248. doi:10.20302/NC.2016.25.19. eISSN 1848-7386.
