= Binciola =

Noble family of the Republic of Ragusa

Coat of arms

The House of Binciola or Binčulić was one of the patrician families of Dubrovnik and the Republic of Ragusa, active between the 12th and 17th centuries.

== Name ==
Their original name, in Italian, was Binciola, which was also spelled Binçola, Binzola, Biniciola, Bensiola and Buccignola. In modern Croatian, it has been transcribed as Binčola, and Slavicized into Binčulić.

== History ==
They hailed from Cavtat in modern-day Croatia, then known as Epidaurum. They were among the eleven smallest houses in the 15th century. In the beginning of the 15th century Ragusan nobility were present in Novo Brdo as merchants or mining lords; Binçola were also present. Serafim Radi enumerated the noble families that lived in Ragusa in 1588, including the Binciolla.

== Members ==
- Bernardus (Bernardo) Bensiola/Binciola (fl. 1550–54)
- Hieronymus D. Marini Buccignola (fl. 1559)
- Johannes ser Marianus [Mariani] Bindola (fl. 1587)
- Marianus Binciola (fl. 1587)
- Marino Binciola, signore
- Stephanus Binciola
- Marinus Nicolai de Binciola (fl. 1647)
- Anselmus Binciola
- Fosco (di) Binciola
- Giugnio de Binciola
- Giorgi Vite Binciola

== See also ==
- Post-Roman patriciates
