= Prodanelli =

Ragusan noble family

Prodanelli Prodanello, Predanelli, Prodančić
- Country: Republic of Ragusa
- Founded: 13th century
- Dissolution: 17th century

The House of Prodanelli or Prodanello (in Latin and Italian; Croatian: Prodančić) was a Ragusan noble family that produced state officials (rectors, senators, judges, diplomats, notaries, etc.), while others were either prelates or sea captains, shipowners and merchants. The family was related to the Palmotta.

== History ==
The founder was Marin de Prodanello (fl. 1273-1304), also called Bauxellus; his descendants, apart from "Prodanello", used Bausella as a surname. Another branch of the family, led by Ursacius Prodanelli (fl. 1253–85) (most likely Marin's brother), did not use the Bausella name. Ursacius' sons were distinguished Ragusan officials: Petrus (fl. 1280–1311) was senator and judge, while Johannes (fl. 1283–97) was canon and notary. They were among the eleven smallest houses in the 15th century.

Another Petar Prodančić, son of Marin, was merchant who did business in medieval Serbian state. His brother Vito (Vitus/Vid) had two sons, Marin and Petar, who continued family business in Serbia. Petar had five sons, among which Jacob (Jakov/Jakša), James (Giacomo) and Theodore (Teodoro/Teodor) were most successful by the end of the 14th century and the beginning of the 15th century. Jacob was merchant and diplomat, and was succeeded by his son Nicholas (Nicola/Nikola/Nikša) while Teodor was succeeded by his son Petar.

In the 16th century there were two last Prodančić family branches left. One of them was that of Petar (~ 1504-1563), son of Nikola, and the other one was that of Stephen (Stefano/Stjepan/Stijepo; 1566-1638), who was the last male member of the family.

In the two-century-long period of time, from 1440 to 1640, there were in total 24 members of the family who entered the Grand Council (Consilium maius), a body consisting of all adult Ragusan noblemen. Twenty of them were elected to the Senate and twenty as Rector (knez) of the Republic, the head of the state.

== Members ==
- Ursacius Prodanelli (fl. 1253–85)
- Petrus (fl. 1280–1311), senator and judge (iudex). Son of Ursacius.
- Johannes (fl. 1283–97), priest (canon) and notary. Son of Ursacius.
- Todor Prodančić (fl. 1428), merchant.
- Jacobus Nicole de Prodanello (d. 1465)
- Brothers ser Theodoro and ser Nicolo de Prodanello denounced three other patricians in court in January 1488.

== Sources ==
- Mahnken, Irmgard (1960). Dubrovački patricijat u XIV veku: Tables. Naučno delo. pp. 10, 14, 15, 30, 52, 70, 72, 128, 141, 355, 373–377.
