= Pridvorje, Dubrovnik-Neretva County =

Pridvorje
- Village
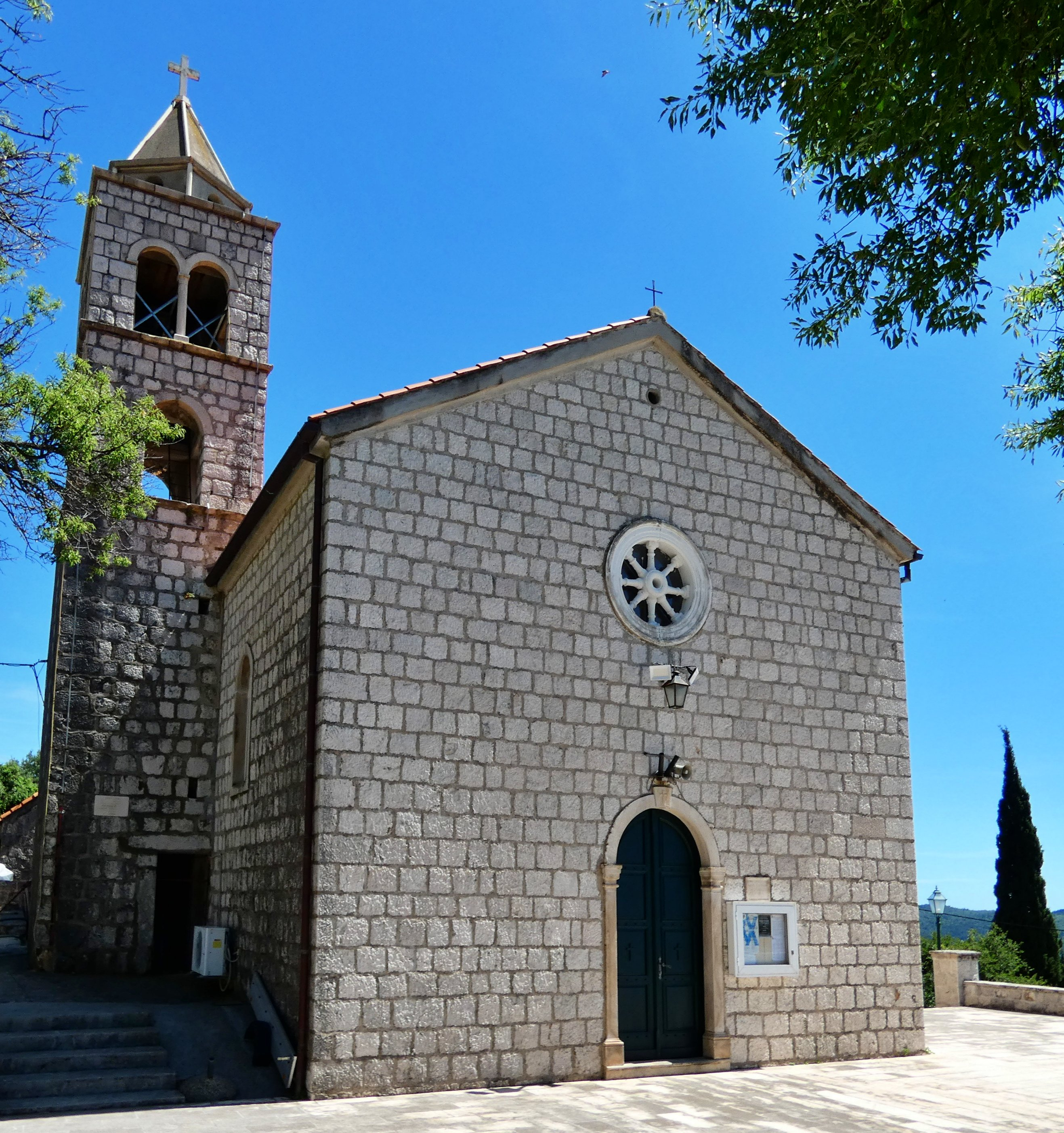
- Church of St. Sergius and Bacchus

- Location within Croatia
- Coordinates: 42.5490314°N 18.3223178°E
- Country: Croatia
- County: Dubrovnik-Neretva County
- Municipality: Konavle

Area
  - Total: 2.6 sq mi (6.8 km^{2})

Population (2021)
  - Total: 222
  - Density: 85/sq mi (33/km^{2})
- Time zone: UTC+1 (CET)
  - Summer (DST): UTC+2 (CEST)

Pridvorje is a village in Croatia, in Konavle municipality.

== Demographics ==
According to the 2021 census, its population was 222.
