= Konavle =

- Municipality
- Općina Konavle; Konavle Municipality
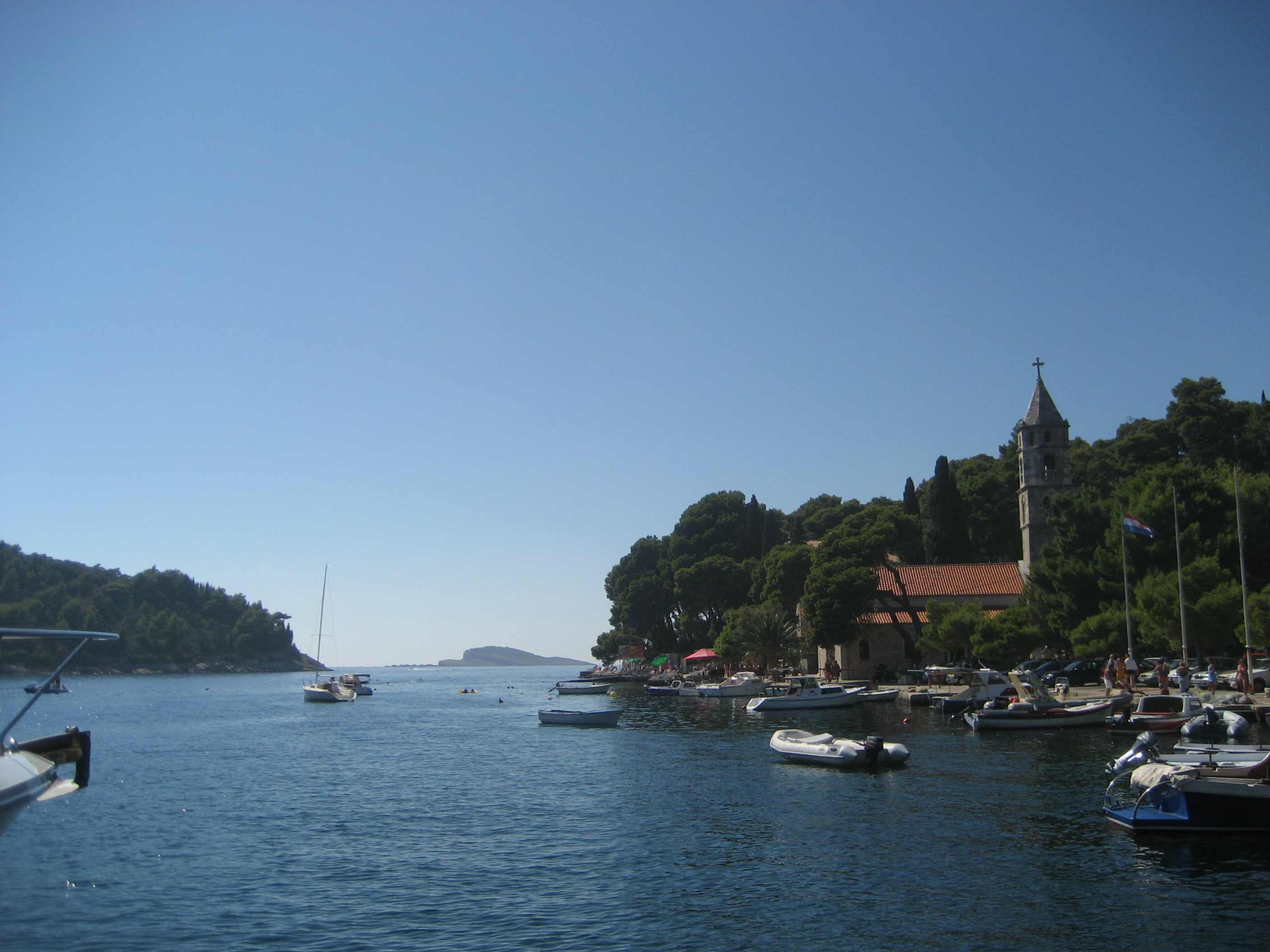
- Cavtat

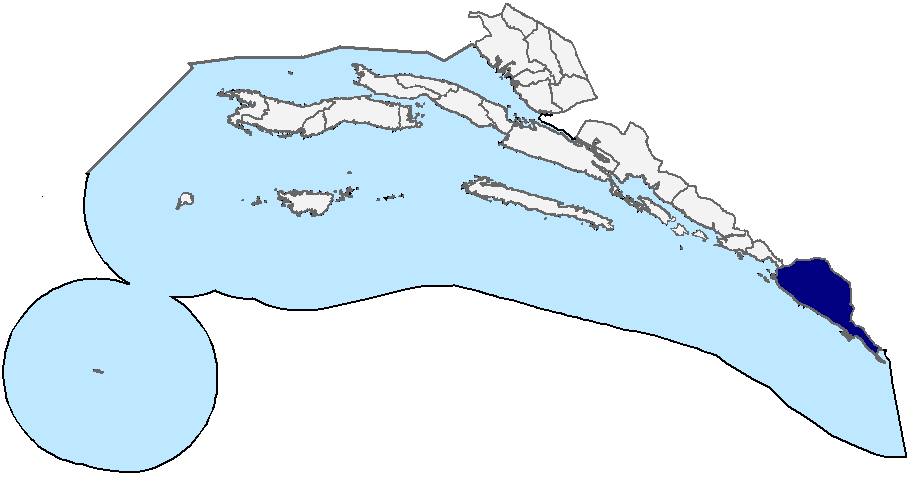
- Location of Konavle within Dubrovnik-Neretva County

- The location of Konavle within Croatia
- Coordinates: 42°31′7″N 18°22′5″E
- Country: Croatia
- County: Dubrovnik-Neretva County
- Seat: Cavtat

Government
  - Mayor: Božo Lasić (HDZ)

Area
  - Total: 210.1 km^{2} (81.1 sq mi)
- Elevation: 0 m (0 ft)

Population (2021)
  - Total: 8,607
  - Density: 40.97/km^{2} (106.1/sq mi)
- Time zone: UTC+1 (CET)
  - Summer (DST): UTC+2 (CEST)
- Postal code: 20 000
- Area code: 020
- Licence plate: DU
- Website: opcinakonavle.hr

Konavle (pronounced [kɔ̌naːv̞lɛ]) is a municipality and a small Dalmatian subregion located southeast of Dubrovnik, Croatia.

The region is administratively part of the Dubrovnik-Neretva County, and the municipal center is Cavtat.

== Demographics ==
The total municipality population was 8,577 people in 2011, split in the following 32 settlements:

- Brotnice, population 31
- Cavtat, population 2,153
- Čilipi, population 933
- Drvenik, population 52
- Duba Konavoska, population 63
- Dubravka, population 295
- Dunave, population 155
- Đurinići, population 96
- Gabrili, population 210
- Gruda, population 741
- Jasenice, population 14
- Komaji, population 275
- Kuna Konavoska, population 17
- Lovorno, population 183
- Ljuta, population 194
- Mihanići, population 96
- Mikulići, population 88
- Močići, population 447
- Molunat, population 212
- Palje Brdo, population 130
- Pločice, population 83
- Poljice, population 70
- Popovići, population 236
- Pridvorje, population 236
- Radovčići, population 228
- Stravča, population 60
- Šilješki, population 22
- Uskoplje, population 136
- Vitaljina, population 211
- Vodovađa, population 190
- Zastolje, population 150
- Zvekovica, population 570

In the 2011 census, 97.1% of the population were Croats. Historically, inhabitants of Konavle were called Canalesi.

Konavle: Population trends 1857–2021
v

population	9092	9234	9304	9949	10701	9886	9088	9590	8916	8813	8729	8329	8551	9074	8250	8577	8607
	1857	1869	1880	1890	1900	1910	1921	1931	1948	1953	1961	1971	1981	1991	2001	2011	2021

Sources: Croatian Bureau of Statistics publications

== History ==
Konavle has been inhabited since the Paleolithic and Neolithic periods. In the 5th and 4th centuries BC, the Illyrian tribes of Pleraei and Ardiaei settled in this area. In the 2nd century BC the Romans developed an important trade and maritime center at the intersection of Roman roads on the site of the Greek colony of Epidaurus. Konavle gets its name from the Latin word canalis, and refers to the irrigation canals that supplied water from the spring in the village of Vodovađa via Kuna Konavoska to Epidaurus. In addition to the remains of the Roman aqueduct near the village of Vodovađa, there are remains of villae rusticae, cult monuments (the Mithraic monument in Močići), graves, the remains of the Roman road above Cavtat, and numerous fragments and archaeological finds.

In the Middle Ages, Konavle was part of Travunia, which at various times was tied to vassalage to Serbian, Dioclean and Bosnian rulers. Archaeological finds and monuments from that period include necropolises of Bogomil stećak tombstones in Konavle Hills, Gabrili, Mihanići and Dunave, of which the most beautiful is considered to be the stećak in Brotnice in the cemetery of the Church of Saint Thomas. However, traditions speak of the Konavle area belonging to Ragusa, which the Republic of Ragusa also refers to in its efforts to bring the entire area back under its rule. In 1427, the authorities of Ragusa set out to eradicate Bogomilism in Konavle. Catholicism was restored there by the Franciscans in a rapid process that converted the entire population.

The charter of the Sanković noble family of Hum states that the people of the old city of Epidaurus gave birth to and inherited the nobility of the city of Ragusa. The old Ragusan chronicles record the same tradition, with Nicola Ragnina and Giunio Resti stating:

Konavle is the oldest jurisdiction of the ruined city of Epidaurus, and therefore it was fitting that after 800 years the descendants of the Epidaurans should regain their old dominion over Konavle and Vitaljina. That these lands belonged to Epidaurus is most clearly evidenced by the aqueduct, built at enormous expense, to bring water to Epidaurus from a distance of 20 miles...

From the above it follows that the heritage of the inhabitants of Epidaurus belongs to the Ragusans, whose envoys declared before the Ottoman sultan in 1430 that Konavle was actually the property of Ragusa at the time when their city was still in its original location, but that this area, as well as other lands, were taken from them by various kings and lords.

At the beginning of the 15th century, Konavle was part of Bosnia in the hands of powerful feudal lords, the eastern part under Sandalj Hranić, and the western part (including Cavtat and Obod) under the brothers Petar and Radoslav Pavlović. Through intensive negotiations and diplomacy, the Republic of Ragusa came into possession of the eastern part of Konavle (from Popovići to Soko Tower and Cape Oštro) on June 24, 1419, by a purchase and sale agreement concluded with Sandalj Hranić, who in return received a palace in Ragusa, land in Župa worth 3,000 Ragusan perpers and an annual tribute of 500 perpers, and 36,000 perpers or 12,000 ducats in cash. Eight years later, on December 31, 1426, the Ragusans purchased the remaining western part of Konavle with Cavtat and Obod from Radoslav Pavlović, under the same conditions as the eastern part.

The Ragusan government declared Konavle its feudal estate, governed by a count enthroned in Pridvorje. Monuments from that era include the Count's Palace in Pridvorje and the Soko Tower in Dunave, an important defensive fortress in the far south of Ragusa. In 1423, the Ragusan government consolidated its rule in the eastern part of Konavle. The government initially decided to take all the land from the people of Konavle and make them all serfs, but it relented and allowed 66 families of small landowners to continue to enjoy and cultivate their own land. In 1427, when the western part of Konavle was purchased, it was divided into 38 acres of arable land, and nothing was left to the small landowners. The First Konavle War lasted from 1430 to 1433, which greatly influenced the situation in Bosnia, Hum and Ragusa, and greatly changed the situation in Southeastern Europe. In 1442, the Ragusans divided the mountains among the landowners, a part of the land went to the Croatian Ban Matko Talovac. However, in the 15th century, the Turks took the mountains away from the Ragusans for good. Pastures, forests, oak groves, water and ponds were common property. Everyone was allowed to use them for free, the only thing that was forbidden was to cut down trees that provided shade for livestock and oak trees that produced acorns for pigs. Sheep, goats, donkeys, horses and cattle were raised. Only the state was allowed to build mills, enclose salt pans, erect threshing floors for flax and hemp and rolling mills for wool, and build churches and houses in lime. Wheat, rye, barley, millet, sorghum, garlic and red onions, broad beans, lentils, pumpkins, cabbage, potatoes, corn, beans, figs, walnuts, mulberries, plums, pears, apples, rowanberries, almonds, lemons, oranges, pomegranates, limes, grapevines, and olives were planted. The peasant kept 3/4, and the lord received 1/4 of the harvest.

The County of Konavle was governed by a count, who was elected by the Grand Council for a term of 6 months (later a year). He could not be elected consecutively. He judged lawsuits such as theft, fighting, burglary, disputes etc. and was initially supported by a jury. He took more serious cases to the Ragusan court. He interrogated witnesses, chased fugitives, supervised the cultivation of the Rector's land, executed sentences, supervised border guarding, repair and construction of public roads, construction of fortifications, and the unloading of ships. He commanded the army (military service covered Konavle residents from 20 to 60 years of age). Military service was free, with the soldiers participating in the division of the spoils. In cases of war danger, the people took refuge in Soko Tower, Cavtat, Molunat or Cape Oštro at the entrance to the Bay of Cattaro. For successful defense, there was also a captain alongside the count. The captain lived in Cavtat, so that Cavtat and Obod formed a Captaincy within the Konavle County. The count lived in the palace in the courtyard, where a monastery was also built. Next to the count, the chancellor lived at the palace, who styled the count's decisions, wrote summonses, kept records of hearings, drew up lawsuits and agricultural, craft and purchase contracts, money bonds, wills etc. The documents of the Konavle chancellery burnt down at the beginning of the 19th century, so a more detailed history of Konavle is unknown and forever erased. At first, chancellors were priests, and later laymen appointed by the government. The chiefs elected by the people took care of taxes. After the uprising of March 29, 1800, new norms were passed. The work may last 90 days, including days when one doesn't work or travel. The lord must give the serf a daily allowance of about 1.6 l of healthy wine, about 0.72 kg of wheat bread, about 0.8 kg of lentils for a meal, enough salt and oil for seasoning, or the equivalent in money. On holidays or rainy days, the serf is entitled to half of this. The first count of Konavle was Marino Gondola, elected on 25 May 1420. The last was Biagio Bernardo Caboga elected in 1807. There were 520 of them in total: 50 Sorgo, 44 Gondola, 41 Bona, 38 Gozze, 35 Cerva, 32 Caboga, 31 Menze, 30 Resti, 26 Zorzi, 25 Pozza, 19 Proculi, 17 Palmotta, 16 Saraca and Zamagna each, 11 Ragnina, 10 Tudisi and some Basilio, Benessa, Binciola, Bonda, Bosdari, Bucchia, Gradi, Natali, Prodanelli, Volcasso and Slatarich. The first count and his successors were elected in the Senate, and the rest in the Great Council. A nobleman who had reached the age of 30 could be elected as a count. In 1660, this age was lowered to 25 years, except for the counts of Stagno and Lagosta. However, in 1739, it was stipulated that the count of Konavle could not be younger than 30 years. The electoral mandate lasted 6 months until 1636, and from then on it was one year. The elected count was not allowed to resign from his service under penalty of 100 perpers, and he could do so without penalty every 2 months during a 6-month mandate. The count had to have 2 viscounts, 1 priest and 3 horses for the needs of his service. The count's salary was 500 perpers for 6 months, and in 1421 it was lowered to 250 perpers, with the proviso that he was no longer obliged to support either the viscounts or the priest, but only 3 horses. The viscount had a salary of 4.5 perpers per month, and the priest 6 perpers. In 1427, after receiving the western part of Konavle, the Republic of Ragusa increased the number of counts from 2 to 6, and the number of horses from 3 to 4. The count's salary was 500 perpers, and the priest's 90. One viscount was appointed with his seat in Površa, and in 1435 another with his seat in Mrcine (today Dubravka). They were primarily responsible for organizing the guards.

In 1597, the people of Konavle had 7 merchant sailing ships. By 1605 they had 6 large and 8 smaller ships from the Cavtat Captaincy. From 1704 to 1734, the people of Cavtat had 31 merchant sailing ships of international importance, while the entire Republic of Ragusa had 85. From 1734 to 1744, they had 28 sailing ships. From 1745 to 1759, there were 50 sea captains from Konavle, 37 from Sabioncello, 21 from Ragusa and Gruž. Konavle remained part of the Republic of Ragusa as its largest granary until its abolition in 1808. After a short-lived French occupation, Konavle was ravaged by Montenegrin and Russian invaders, and after the Congress of Vienna in 1815, it passed under Austrian rule along with the rest of the Ragusan possessions.

Major floods destroyed the grapes in 1905 and 1906, and in 1901 the railway was put into operation. In the second half of the 19th century, the first schools, telegraphs and steamships arrived. The first Lower Boys' Elementary School was opened in Cavtat in 1824, and was led by Professor Niko Gjurian. The post office in Cavtat was opened in 1840, and the first telegraph started working on November 12, 1865. The post office in Čilipi was opened on September 21, 1907, and the telegraph on December 22, 1909. In 1929 only 1063 tourists stayed in Cavtat, of which 135 were foreign. For comparison in 1979, 56425 tourists stayed, 38533 of which were foreign.

During the Croatian War of Independence the region was occupied from October 1991 to May 1992 by Yugoslav Army forces from the Republic of Montenegro. Though considerably damaged at the time of its liberation, Konavle maintains its status as one of the wealthiest municipalities in Dalmatia and all of Croatia, consistently ranking amongst the ten richest.

== Geography ==
Konavle is actually a narrow field located between the Sniježnica mountain and the Adriatic Sea, spanning the area from the coastal town of Cavtat to the Montenegrin border at Prevlaka. Other than Cavtat, only the southernmost village of Molunat is located on the coast, while the other 30 villages are in the hinterland.

The Sniježnica peak at 1234 meters of altitude is the highest point of the Dubrovnik-Neretva County and village of Kuna with its 700 m altitude is the highest village in the county. Although Gruda is the administrative center of the municipality, the largest settlement is Cavtat.

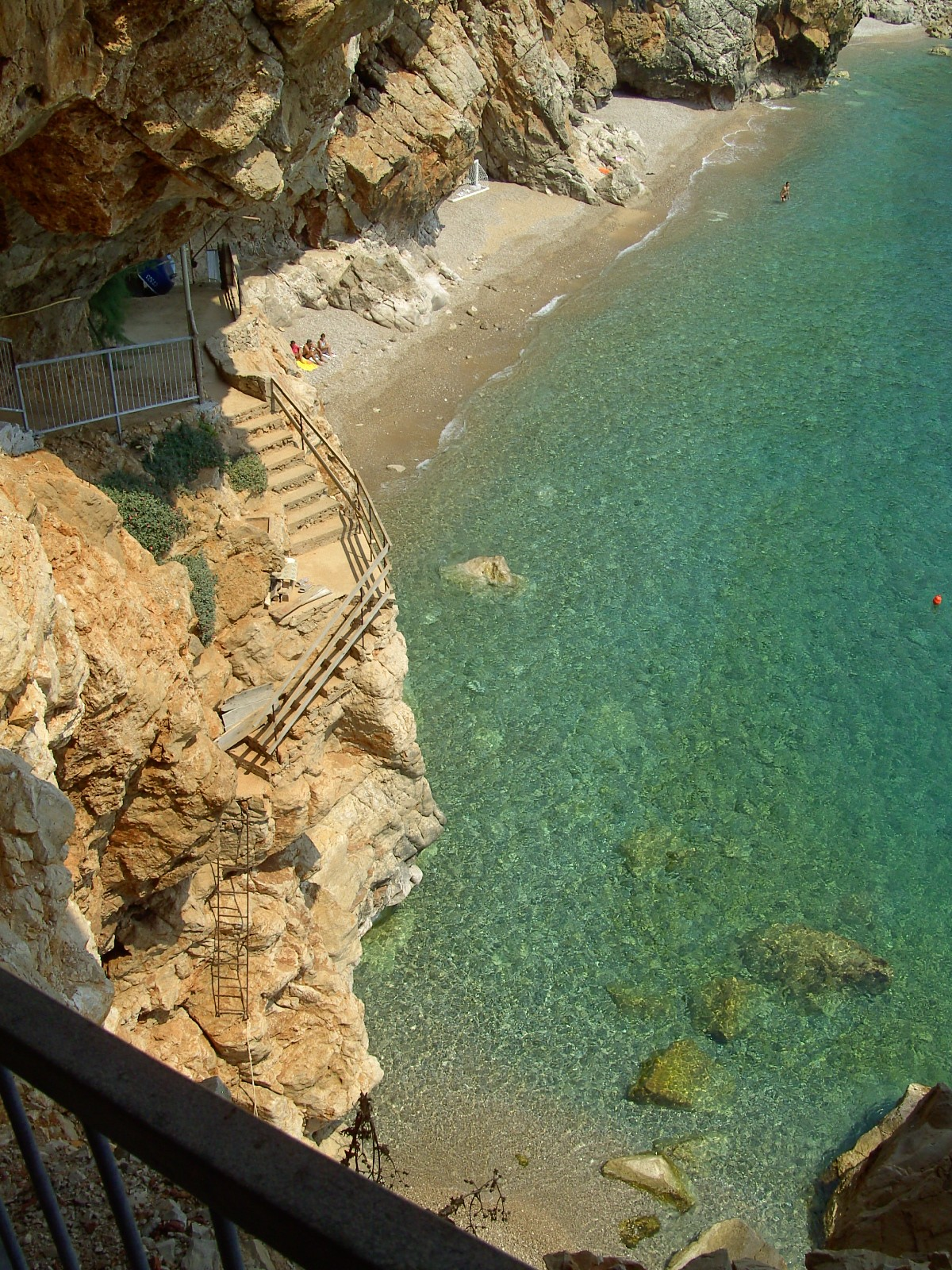
Pasjača Beach

A few kilometres from Cavtat there is Pasjača, selected by Forbes in 2024 as the most beautiful beach in Europe, hidden below the Konavle cliffs.

== Transport ==
The airport for Dubrovnik is located near the Konavle village of Čilipi.

== Notable people from Konavle ==
- Tereza Kesovija, singer
- Vlaho Bukovac, painter
- Frano Supilo, politician
- Baltazar Bogišić, jurist and legal historian
- Ivan Gundulić, poet, Prince of Konavle
- Anton Perich, artist, filmmaker, poet
