= D300 road =

Road in Croatia

D300 state road

Route information
- Length: 12.2 km (7.6 mi)

Major junctions
- From: D21 junction in Buje
- A9 in Umag interchange
- To: Umag

Location
- Country: Croatia
- Counties: Istria

Highway system
- Highways in Croatia

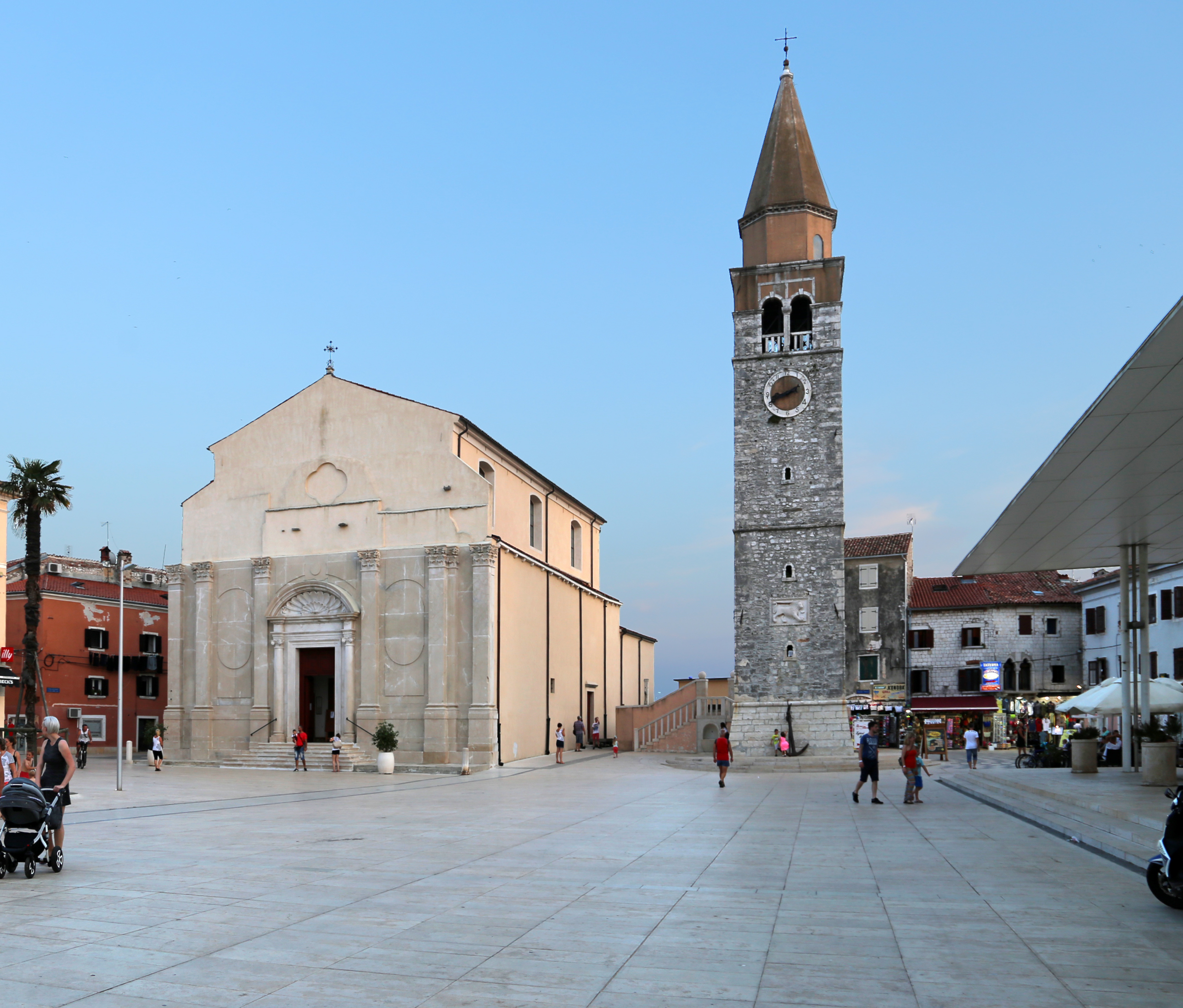
Umag, at the western terminus of D300

D300 is a state road connecting A9 with Umag and D21 state road in Buje. The road is 12.2 km long.

The road, as well as all other state roads in Croatia, is managed and maintained by Hrvatske ceste, state owned company.

== Traffic volume ==
Traffic is regularly counted and reported by Hrvatske ceste, operator of the road. Substantial variations between annual (AADT) and summer (ASDT) traffic volumes are attributed to the fact that the road connects A9 motorway carrying substantial tourist traffic to Umag, a major summer resort.

D300 traffic volume
Road	Counting site	AADT	ASDT	Notes
D300	2705 Grando	5,284	6,636	The westernmost traffic counting site on D300.
D300	2718 Buje west	6,335	8,571	The easternmost traffic counting site on D300.

== Road junctions and populated areas ==
D300 junctions/populated areas
Type	Slip roads/Notes
	D21 to Krasica and to Kaštel border crossing to Slovenia. Eastern terminus of the road.
	Ž5070 to Brtonigla
	Umag interchange: A9 motorway to Pula (to the south) and to Ž5002 road (to the north) which serves as a short connecting road to D200 and D510 state roads leading to border crossings Kaštel and Plovanija to Slovenia.
	L50011 to Kršete and Brtonigla
	Materada
	Juricani; L50008 to Čepljani
	Petrovija; L50006 to Vilanija
	Finida
	Umag: Ž5002 to Novigrad to the south and Savudrija to the north Western terminus of the road.

== See also ==
- Istrian Y
