= D300 (disambiguation) =

D300 refers to the Nikon D300, a camera

D300 may also refer to:

- D300 road, a state road in Croatia
- Dodge D300, a pickup truck
