= Seget =

Seget may refer to:

- Seget, Croatia, a municipality in Split-Dalmatia County, Croatia
- Seget, Istria County, a village in near Umag, Croatia
- Seget, Indonesia, a district in Sorong Regency, West Papua
- Seget language, a language of West Papua, Indonesia
- Thomas Seget (1569–1627), Scottish poet

== See also ==
- Szeged, a city in Hungary
