= Livia Puljak =

Croatian scientist

Dr. Livia Puljak Associate Professor
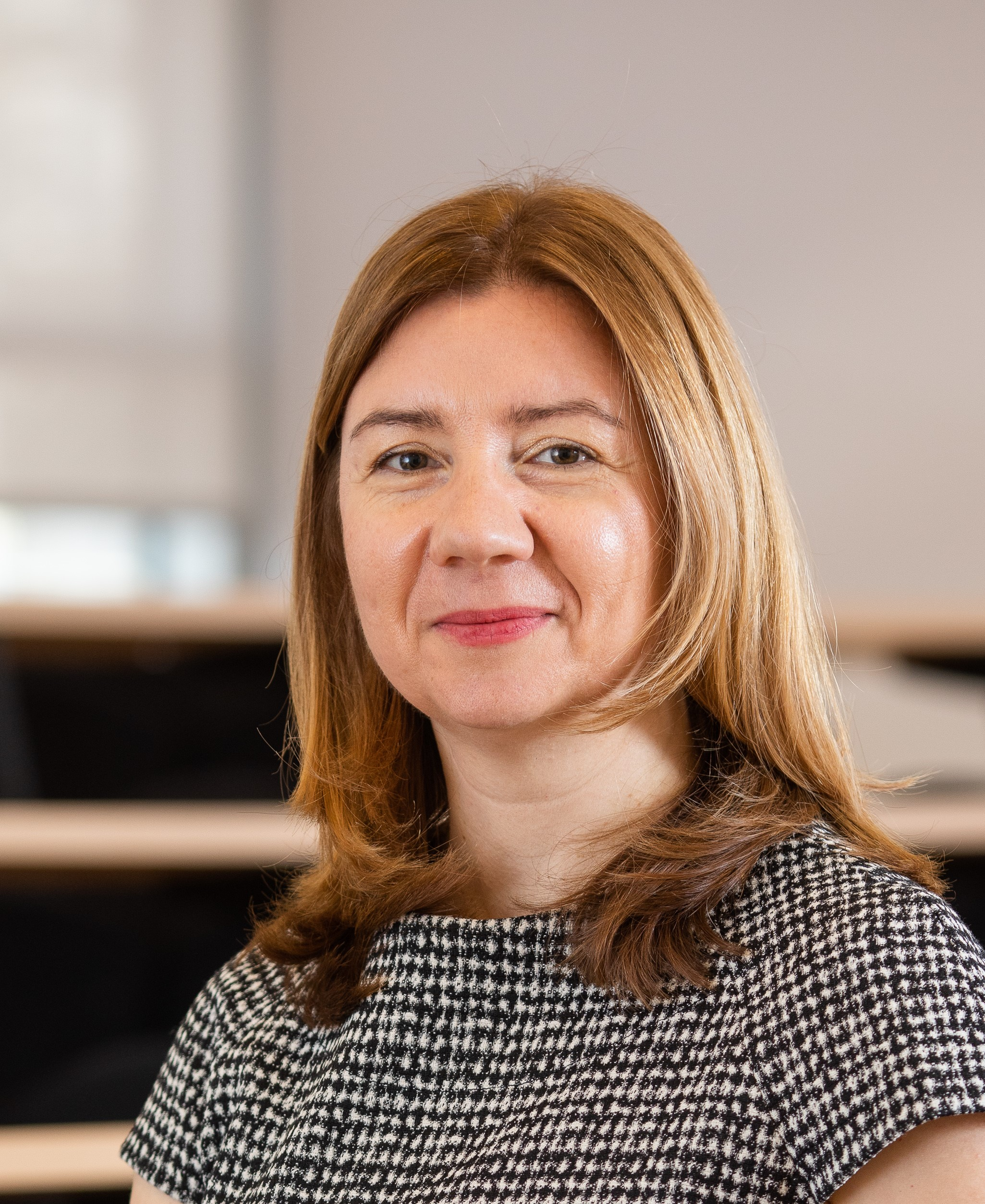
- Born: October 25, 1977 (age 48); Split, SFR Yugoslavia
- Education: postdoctoral training at the University of Colorado, and the University of Texas Southwestern Medical Center
- Alma mater: Faculty of Medicine in Split, University of Split
- Known for: founder of the Split branch of the CroMSIC Student Association; head of education at the Croatian Cochrane Branch
- Awards: The Chris Silagy Prize
- Scientific career
- Fields: Histology and Embryology
- Institutions: University of Split

Livia Puljak (born October 25, 1977, in Split, SFR Yugoslavia) is a Croatian scientist and associate professor at the Faculty of Medicine in Split. She is the head of the Department of Histology and Embryology, Faculty of Medicine, Split.

== Biography ==
Born on October 25, 1977, in Split, she graduated from the Faculty of Medicine in Split in 2002. She completed her three-year postdoctoral training in the United States, at the University of Colorado Health Sciences Center, Denver, Colorado and at the University of Texas Southwestern Medical Center, Dallas, Texas. She received her PhD in 2008 from the Faculty of Medicine in Split. She is an associate professor at the Department of Histology and Embryology, School of Medicine, University of Split.

During her studies, she founded the Split branch of the CroMSIC Student Association, and the Postdoctoral Fellowship in Dallas. Upon returning to Croatia, she launched the Croatian branch of Cochrane Collaboration and was the first director of the Croatian Cochrane Branch. From 2010 to 2011 she was Vice-Dean for Science at the Faculty of Medicine in Split. She is the head of the PhD program in Translational Research in Biomedicine, and a member of the Board of Directors of the Željko J. Bošnjak Foundation.

== Popularization of science ==
She is the head of education at the Croatian Cochrane Branch, a member of the organizing committee of the University of Split Science Festival, and the organizing committee of the Researchers' Night in Split. Participates in lectures at Brain Week. Within the project of popularization of science of the Ministry of Science and Education of the Republic of Croatia, she translated the book Where is the Proof? (Gdje su dokazi?) which was released in March 2014 by Profile. She is the editor of the portal Evidence in Medicine, and the author of more than 100 scientific papers published in world journals.

== Awards and recognition ==
In 2017, she was awarded The Chris Silagy Prize for an extraordinary contribution to Cochrane work and promotion of medicine based on scientific evidence.
