= Fulvio Tomizza =

Italian writer

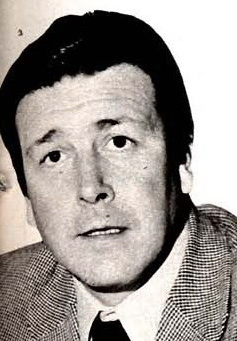
- Born: 26 January 1935; Giurizzani di Materada, then Kingdom of Italy (now Juricani/Giurizzani, part of Croatia)
- Died: 26 May 1999 (aged 64); Trieste, Italy
- Occupations: Writer & Journalist

Fulvio Tomizza (26 January 1935 – 21 May 1999) was an Italian writer. He was born in Giurizzani di Materada in Istria, to a middle-class family. His mother was Margherita Frank Trento, born into a poor family of Slavic extraction. His father, Ferdinando, reportedly was from an ancient family of southern Dalmatian Italian origins (reportedly, his ancestor's name was Zorzi Giurizzano, and he allegedly came to Istria in the 16th century from Dalmatia). Tomizza grew up in a zone where the dialect was mixed (Venetian mixed with Slavic words or Slavic mixed with Venetian words).

He completed high school at the Italian Liceo "Carlo Combi" of Capodistria (now Koper, in Slovenia). After the diploma, he had experiences of study and work in Yugoslavia (Faculty of Humanities in Belgrade and the shooting of a film in Ljubljana).

Following the 1954 annexation of Zone B by Yugoslavia, Tomizza moved to Trieste.

Most of his writing career took place there, including three books (Materada, La miglior vita, La quinta stagione) set in the Istria of his youth.

Other works include the figure of the bishop-reformer Pier Paolo Vergerio, the life of the exiled Istrians in Italy, some events concerning the Slovenian community in Italy (one couple mysteriously killed during World War II in Trieste and the love story between an Italian official and a Slovenian girl; each story is based on facts, using original letters), some fictions set in the Venetian territory and various articles (also effect of his trips as reporter).

The two books translated into English and published in the U.S. are Heavenly Supper: The Story of Maria Janis, translated by Anne Jacobson Shutte (an expert on Pier Paolo Vergerio), and Materada (Writings from an Unbound Europe), translated by Russell Scott Valentino.

== Bibliography ==
- Materada, Milano: 1960.
- La ragazza di Petrovia, Milano: 1963.
- La quinta stagione, Milano: 1965.
- Il bosco di acacie, Milano: 1966.
- Trilogia Istriana, raccolta, Milano: 1967. Comprede i racconti Materada, La ragazza di Petrovia e Il bosco di acacie.
- L'albero dei sogni, Milano: 1969.
- La torre capovolta, Milano: 1971.
- La città di Miriam, Milano: 1972.
- Dove tornare, Milano: 1974.
- Trick, storia di un cane, Milano: 1975.
- La miglior vita, Milano: 1977.
- La pulce in gabbia, 1979.
- L'amicizia, Milano: 1980.
- La finzione di Maria, Milano: 1981.
- Il male viene dal Nord, Milano: 1984.
- Ieri, un secolo fa, Milano: 1985.
- Gli sposi di via Rossetti, Milano: 1986.
- Quando Dio uscì di chiesa, Milano: 1987.
- Poi venne Cernobyl, Venezia: 1989.
- L'ereditiera veneziana, Milano: 1989.
- Fughe incrociate, Milano: 1990.
- M'identifico con la frontiera, discorso tenuto in occasione della 5ª edizione del Premio nazionale dei giovani Costantino Pavan per opere sulle culture locali, Città di San Donà di Piave, 27 ottobre 1990, poi in Alle spalle di Trieste.
- Destino di frontiera, Genova 1992; libro-intervista
- I rapporti colpevoli, Milano : 1993.
- Anche le pulci hanno la tosse, Trieste: 1993.
- L'abate Roys e il fatto innominabile, Milano: 1994.
- Alle spalle di Trieste, Milano: 1995; scritti dal '69 al '94.
- Dal luogo del sequestro, Milano: 1996.
- Franziska, Milano: 1997.
- Nel chiaro della notte, Milano: 1999.
- La visitatrice, Milano: 2000.
- Il sogno dalmata, Milano: 2001.

== Awards ==
- 1969 Viareggio Prize
- 1977 Strega Prize
- 1979 Austrian State Prize for European Literature
- 1986 Vilenica Prize
