= School of Medicine, University of Split =

Medical school in Croatia

Coordinates: 43°30′20″N 16°28′01″E

- Medicinski fakultet u Splitu
- Type: Public
- Established: 26 March 1997
- Dean: Ante Tonkić
- Location: Split, Croatia

The School of Medicine in Split (Croatian: Medicinski fakultet u Splitu, Latin: Universitas Studiorum Spalatensis – Facultas Medica) is a medical school in Split, Croatia. It is part of the University of Split. The School of Medicine in Split is affiliated with the University Hospital Split, its major teaching hospital, as well as several other community sites. The school's mission is to link education, research and clinical care. Faculty of the school hold appointments in basic sciences in the Basic Science Building, located in Križine neighbourhood of Split, Croatia. The faculty also hold appointments in clinical departments located in multiple affiliated hospitals and institutions. The current dean of the school is Ante Tonkić.

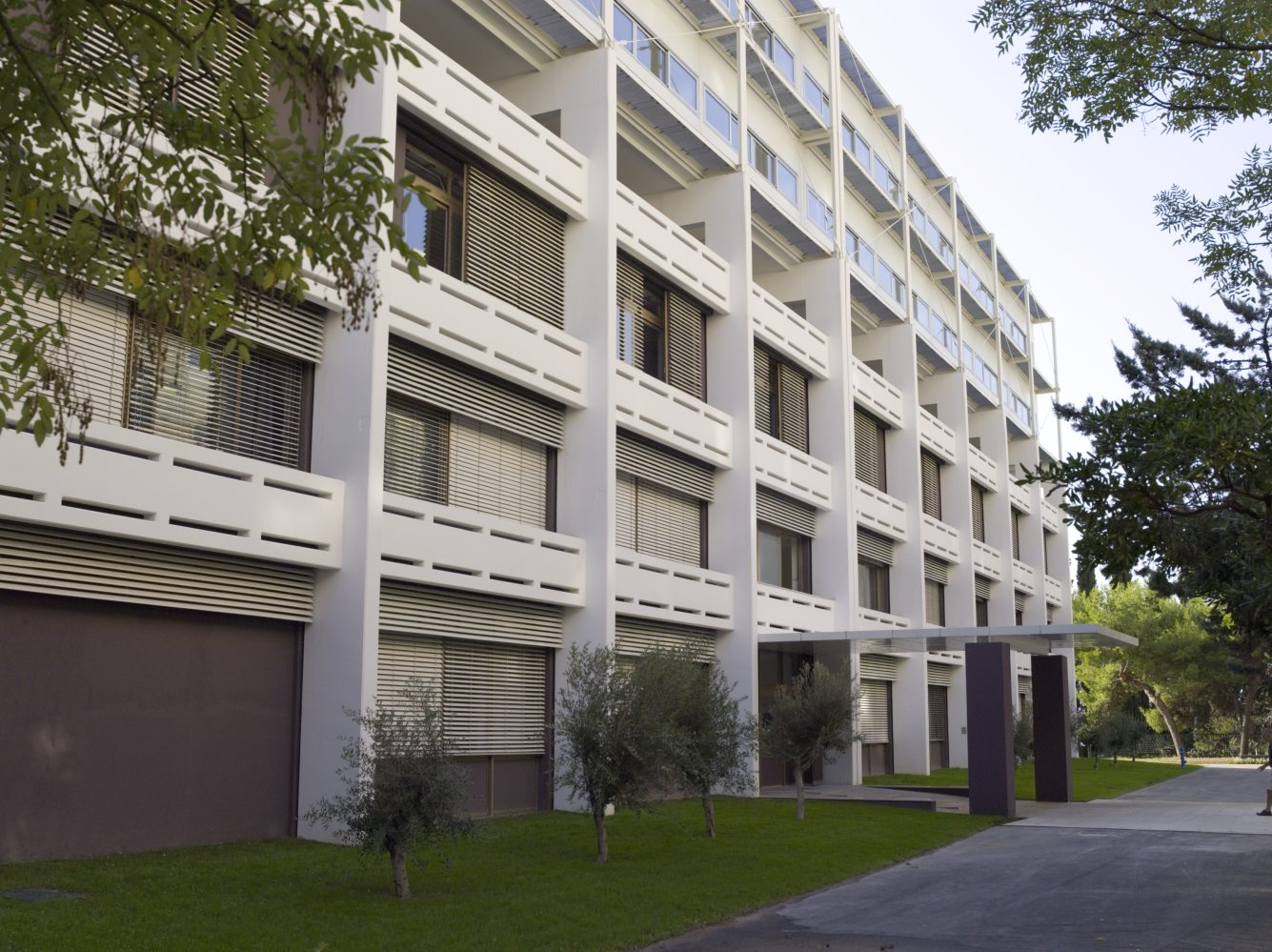
School of Medicine in Split

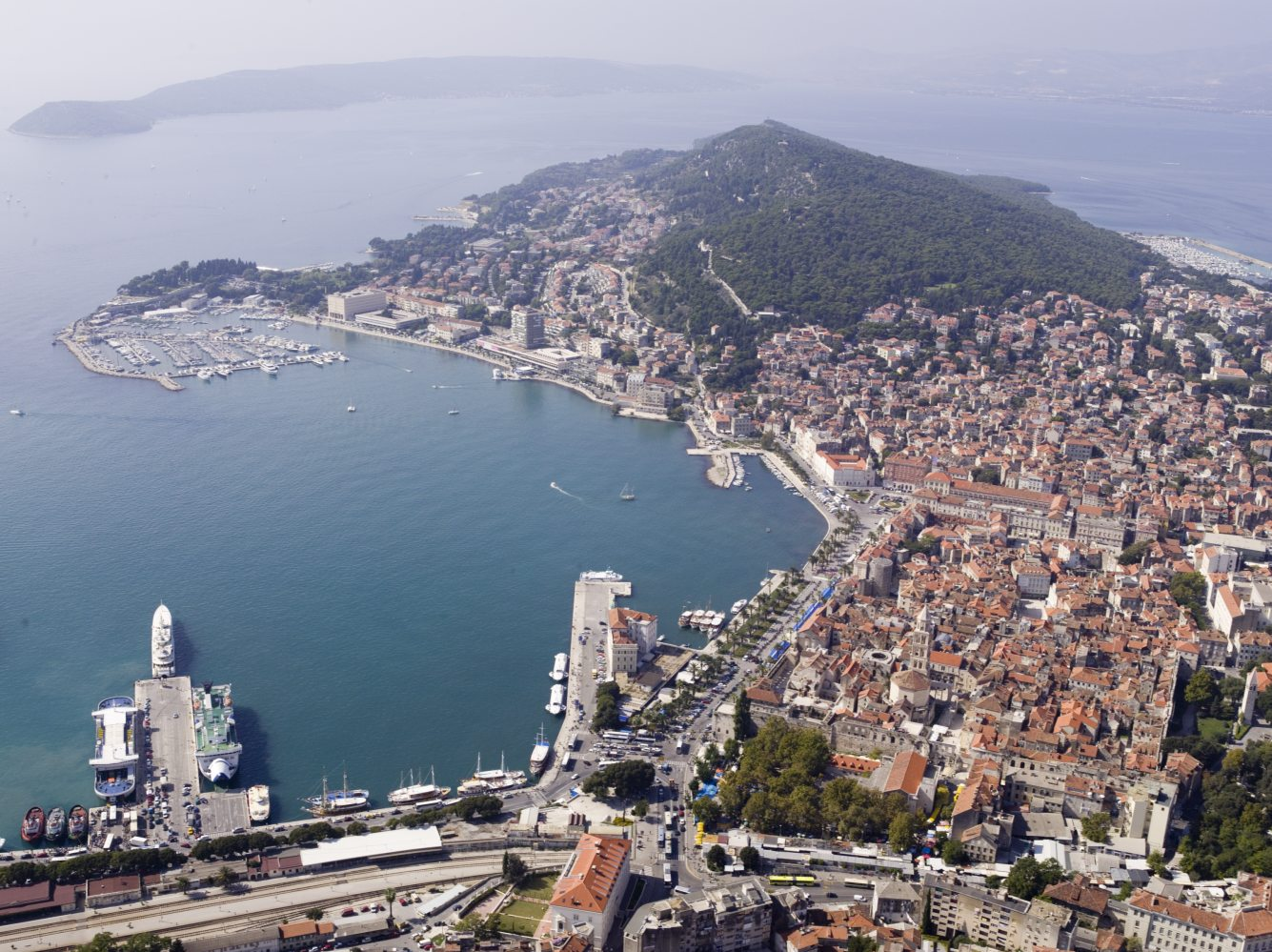
Aerial view of Split

== History ==
In 1974 Zagreb University School of Medicine founded Study of Medicine in Split, which enabled medical students enrolled in Zagreb to complete their last two clinical years in Split. In 1979 the first entrance exam was held at Study of Medicine in Split and enabled medical students to complete their entire medical education in Split. At the time medical studies in Croatia lasted 5 years, which was changed in 1990/1991 academic year, when medical curriculum was extended to 6 years. The difficulties stemming from the organizational scheme of work of Zagreb University School of Medicine and its branch in Split, and particularly complex political and geographical relations were reasons for transformation of medical studies in Split in a separate institution. In 1997 independent School of Medicine in Split was founded as a part of University of Split.
There were 54 students in the first generation of medical students at School of Medicine in Split. From that time, when Medicine was the only study program, the school grew into versatile biomedical educational center that provides multiple study programs.

== Study programs ==
The School of Medicine offers four undergraduate study programs: Medicine, Dental Medicine and Pharmacy (in collaboration with the School of Chemical Engineering) as well as Medical Studies in English. The three aforementioned programs are conducted in Croatian, English and Russian.

Medical studies in English (MD program) began in 2011/2012 academic year with 21 students from all over Europe, who started their first study year on October 3, 2011. Students enrolled in the English MD program of the University of Split School of Medicine are eligible for the US (USMLE) and Canadian (MCC) medical licensing exams. Students attending the program are mainly from countries in eastern Europe and Scandinavia as well as Germany. The program has been gradually expanded, and per school year of 2016/17 enroll up to 60 students. 25 of these are reserved for students attending an exchange program between USSM and Regiomed Kliniken in Germany. Application numbers have recent years increased significantly as the program has gained reputation.

The school offers three doctoral programs Biology of Neoplasms (BN), Evidence-Based Medicine (EBM) and Translational Research in Biomedicine (TRIBE). In 2009/2010 academic year the school has offered specialized one-year postgraduate program in Clinical Epidemiology.

== Research activities ==
Majority of the research activities in the school are focused on clinical and life sciences. There is also some research in the field of social and behavioral sciences.

=== Strategic research fields ===
In the Strategy of development of School of Medicine in Split 2009–2014, core research activities were identified, based on the ongoing research activities: cardiovascular science, oncology, public health, forensic science and neuroscience.

=== Scientometrics ===
Before Research Office was founded in the school, scientometric indicators were measured and published by individual scientists interested in the subject. In 2009, Research Office was founded, and now this office creates annual scientometric report for the school. In these reports, a number of articles published in international journals that are indexed in Current Contents (CC) database is measured, because publishing in the CC database is a prerequisite to attain academic advancement in Croatia. The first CC article of an author affiliated with medical studies in Split was published in 1987. From then, the number of articles published by authors from Split in these databases has been steadily increasing.
From 2000 to 2006, clinical and life scientists published 350 articles indexed in the CC. The number of articles rose from 30 in 2000 to 76 in 2006, and the average impact factor of journals where these articles were published increased from 2.03 in 2000 to 2.89 in 2006. Twenty percent of articles (72/350) were published in the Croatian Medical Journal.
Number of articles published by the school's scientists in CC categories of clinical, life, social and behavioral sciences during year 2009 was 115.

== Student organizations ==
=== Student Council ===
Croatian Student Council (in Croatian: Hrvatski studentski zbor) is an umbrella organization representing all students in Croatia. It consists of 7 unions from all Croatian universities, and a representative for polytechnics and schools of professional higher education. Student Council of the School of Medicine in Split is a member of the Student Council of University of Split. Croatian Student Council is by law responsible for promotion of students' interests, monitoring the conduction of student regulations and representing students.
At the School of Medicine in Split all students are by default members of the Student Council. Students of each study year elect their representative and a deputy, to represent their interests. The current president is Alen Juginović.

=== CroMSIC ===
Croatian Medical Students' International Committee (CroMSIC) is a student organization with local committees in all four Croatian medical schools. CroMSIC is the full member of International Federation of Medical Students' Associations (IFMSA), which has more than million members and is the largest association of medical students in the world. CroMSIC has been a full member of the IFMSA since 1992, when it was founded by medical students from Rijeka and Zagreb.
CroMSIC's Local Committee Split was founded on May 27, 2000, when the first meeting of the local association was held. Activities of CroMSIC are conducted through six committees dedicated to professional and research exchange of students, medical education, public health, reproductive health and AIDS, and human rights and peace. Foreign students coming to Split for a student exchange via CroMSIC will do their clinical or research practice at University Hospital Split or other teaching institutions affiliated with the School of Medicine in Split.

=== Croatian Academic Union ===
Croatian Academic Union (in Croatian: Hrvatska akademska zajednica - HAZ) is a student association that became active at the School of Medicine in Split in 2007. Members of the Union are students and graduates of Croatian universities. Activities of the association are devoted to student issues and educational, social and humanitarian aspects of student life. Croatian Academic Union of the University of Split has so far organized humanitarian football tournaments, humanitarian concerts, visits to other medical schools and various professional and research activities for students.

=== ISA ===
ISA-USSM was created in 2014 by Pierre Sanchis and Andrija Jukić. The goal of the association is to help integrate the Medical Studies in English Program into Split and live a balance life during their six-year studies. In order to help realize this goal, the president and vice president overlook four divisions of ISA-USSM of which these divisions are further supervised by “directors”. The divisions are as follows: Events, Activities, International Affairs and Communications, and finally, University Affairs. ISA-USSM also helps incoming potential students about the application process to the best of their abilities. The current president and vice president are Mikey Lem and Jeremy Moore respectively.

== The School Day ==
The day when independent School of Medicine in Split was founded, March 26, is celebrated as The School Day. Every year on School Day various sports and cultural activities are organized, and awards given to creditable individuals.

== Magazine ==
Magazine of the School of Medicine in Split has been published twice a year since 2007. Contributors to the Magazine are students, employees and associates of the School. The Magazine is edited by a five-member editorial board. The goal of the Magazine is to report about various teaching, professional and research activities in the School and its affiliated institutions. Each issue of the Magazine is printed in 500 copies. Paper copies of the Magazine are distributed free of charge in the School Library. The Magazine may also be read online on the School web site.
