= Sveta Marija na Krasu, Umag =

Sveta Marija na Krasu Madonna del Carso
- Village
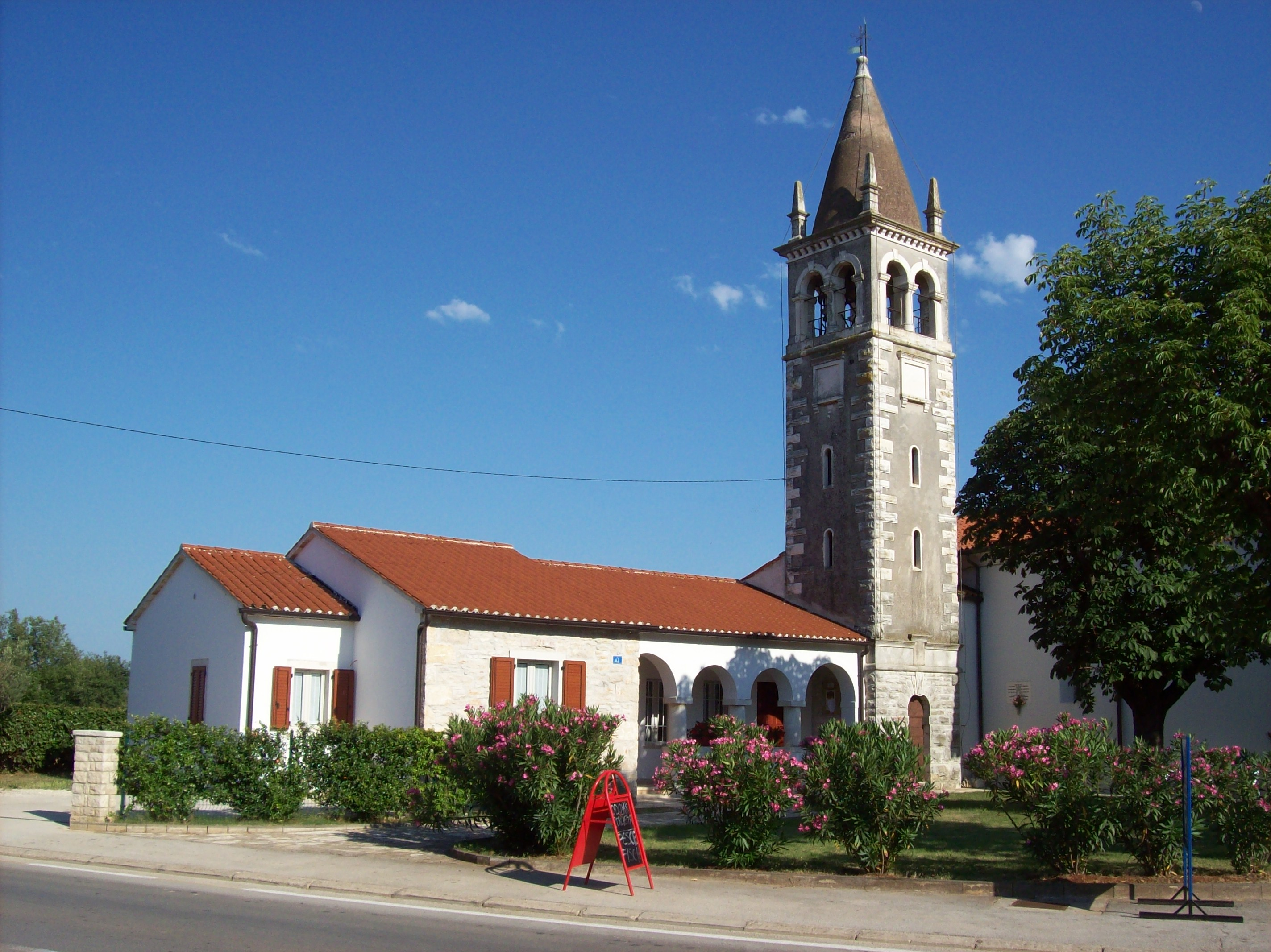

- Location within Croatia
- Coordinates: 45°27′00″N 13°34′48″E
- Country: Croatia
- County: Istria County
- Municipality: Umag

Area
  - Total: 2.7 sq mi (7.1 km^{2})

Population (2021)
  - Total: 313
  - Density: 110/sq mi (44/km^{2})
- Time zone: UTC+1 (CET)
  - Summer (DST): UTC+2 (CEST)
- Postal code: 52470 Umag
- Area code: 052

Sveta Marija na Krasu (Italian: Madonna del Carso) is a village in Umag-Umago municipality in Istria County, Croatia.

== Demographics ==
According to the 2021 census, its population was 313. It was 293 in 2001.
