= Vardica =

Vardica Vardizza
- Village
- Location within Croatia
- Coordinates: 45°26′02″N 13°35′31″E
- Country: Croatia
- County: Istria County
- Municipality: Umag

Area
  - Total: 1.2 sq mi (3.2 km^{2})

Population (2021)
  - Total: 68
  - Density: 55/sq mi (21/km^{2})
- Time zone: UTC+1 (CET)
  - Summer (DST): UTC+2 (CEST)
- Postal code: 52470 Umag
- Area code: 052

Vardica (Italian: Vardizza) is a village in Umag municipality in Istria County, Croatia.

== Demographics ==
According to the 2021 census, its population was 68. It was 76 in 2001.
