= Murine (Umag) =

Murine Morno, Morino
- Village
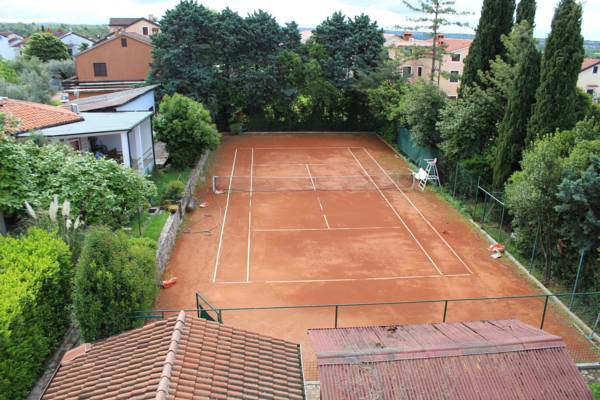
- Part of the village

- Location within Croatia
- Coordinates: 45°27′04″N 13°32′20″E
- Country: Croatia
- County: Istria County
- Municipality: Umag

Area
  - Total: 2.4 sq mi (6.2 km^{2})

Population (2021)
  - Total: 970
  - Density: 410/sq mi (160/km^{2})
- Time zone: UTC+1 (CET)
  - Summer (DST): UTC+2 (CEST)
- Postal code: 52470 Umag
- Area code: 052

Murine (Italian: Morno or Morino) is a village in Umag municipality in Istria County, Croatia.

== Demographics ==
According to the 2021 census, its population was 970. It was 630 in 2001.
