= Katoro (Umag) =

Katoro Cattoro
- Village
- Katoro
- Location within Croatia
- Coordinates: 45°27′36″N 13°30′58″E
- Country: Croatia
- County: Istria County
- Municipality: Umag

Area
  - Total: 0.50 sq mi (1.3 km^{2})

Population (2021)
  - Total: 26
  - Density: 52/sq mi (20/km^{2})
- Time zone: UTC+1 (CET)
  - Summer (DST): UTC+2 (CEST)
- Postal code: 52470 Umag
- Area code: 052

Katoro (Italian: Cattoro) is a village in Umag municipality in Istria County, Croatia.

== Demographics ==
According to the 2021 census, its population was 26. It was 14 in 2001.
