= Đuba =

Đuba Giubba
- Village
- Location within Croatia
- Coordinates: 45°24′25″N 13°31′59″E
- Country: Croatia
- County: Istria County
- Municipality: Umag

Area
  - Total: 0.46 sq mi (1.2 km^{2})

Population (2021)
  - Total: 128
  - Density: 280/sq mi (110/km^{2})
- Time zone: UTC+1 (CET)
  - Summer (DST): UTC+2 (CEST)
- Postal code: 52470 Umag
- Area code: 052

Đuba (Italian: Giubba) is a village in Umag municipality in Istria County, Croatia.

== Demographics ==
Right now there are 69 people. According to the 2021 census, its population was 128. It was 86 in 2001.
