= Vilanija =

Vilanija Villania
- Village
- Location within Croatia
- Country: Croatia
- County: Istria County
- Municipality: Umag

Area
  - Total: 0.73 sq mi (1.9 km^{2})

Population (2021)
  - Total: 284
  - Density: 390/sq mi (150/km^{2})
- Time zone: UTC+1 (CET)
  - Summer (DST): UTC+2 (CEST)
- Postal code: 52470 Umag
- Area code: 052

Vilanija (Italian: Villania) is a village in Umag municipality in Istria County, Croatia.

== Demographics ==
According to the 2021 census, its population was 284. It was 178 in 2001.
