= Čepljani =

Čepljani Ceppiani
- Village
- Location within Croatia
- Country: Croatia
- County: Istria County
- Municipality: Umag

Area
  - Total: 0.42 sq mi (1.1 km^{2})

Population (2021)
  - Total: 210
  - Density: 490/sq mi (190/km^{2})
- Time zone: UTC+1 (CET)
  - Summer (DST): UTC+2 (CEST)
- Postal code: 52470 Umag
- Area code: 052

Čepljani (Italian: Ceppiani) is a village in Croatia.

== Demographics ==
According to the 2021 census, its population was 210.
