= Umag =

Umag Umago
- Town
- Grad Umag – Città di Umago; Town of Umag
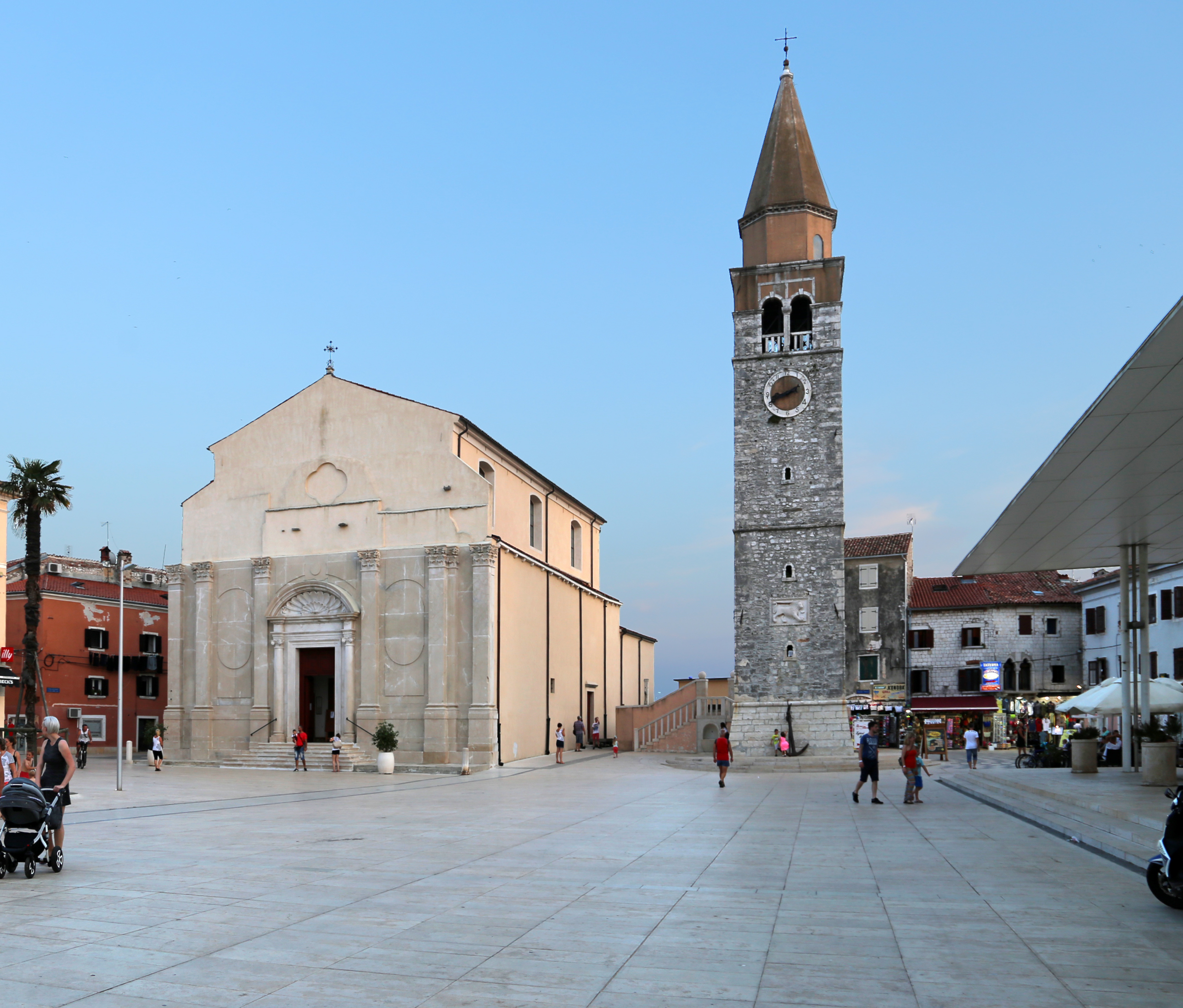
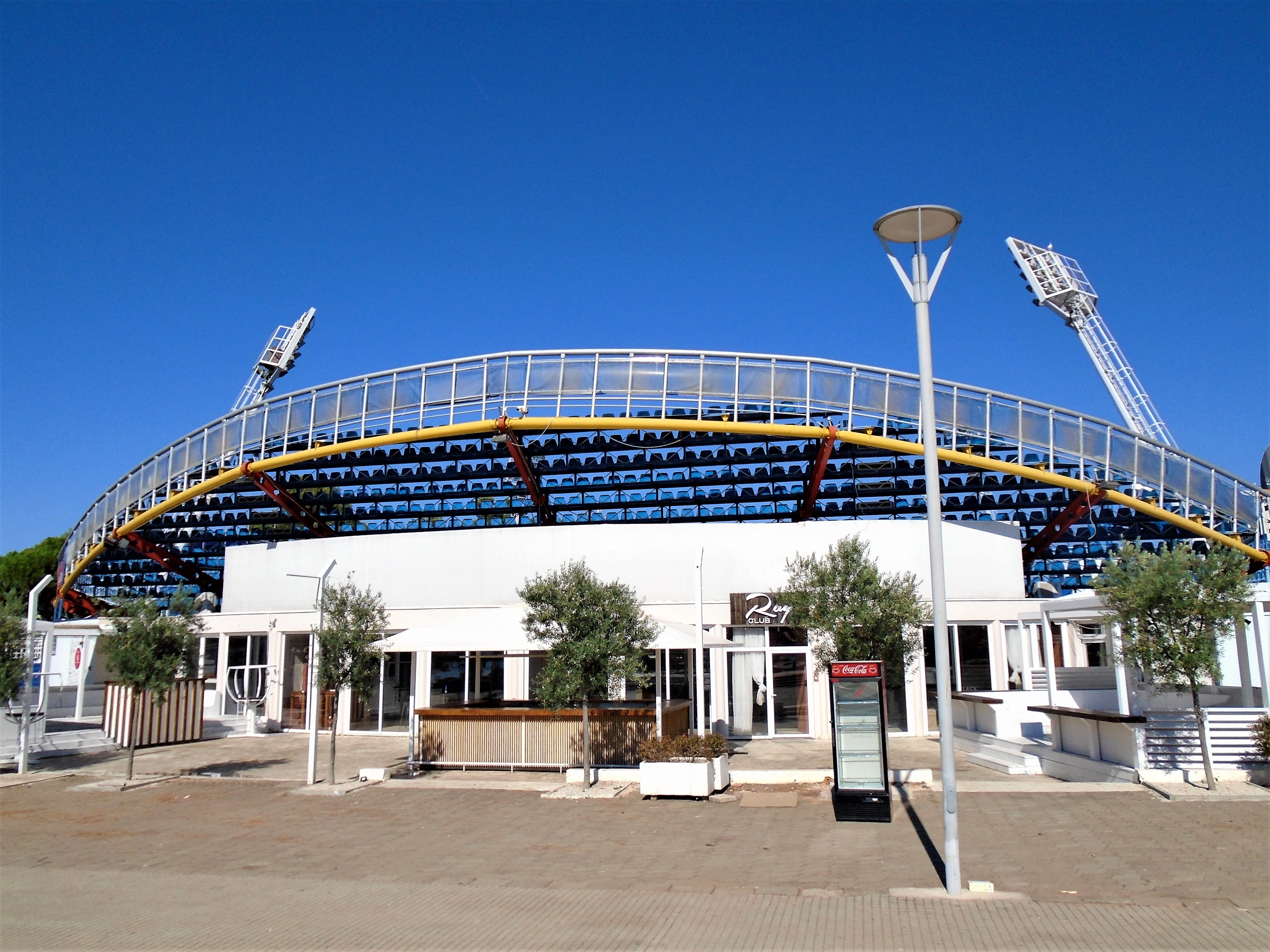
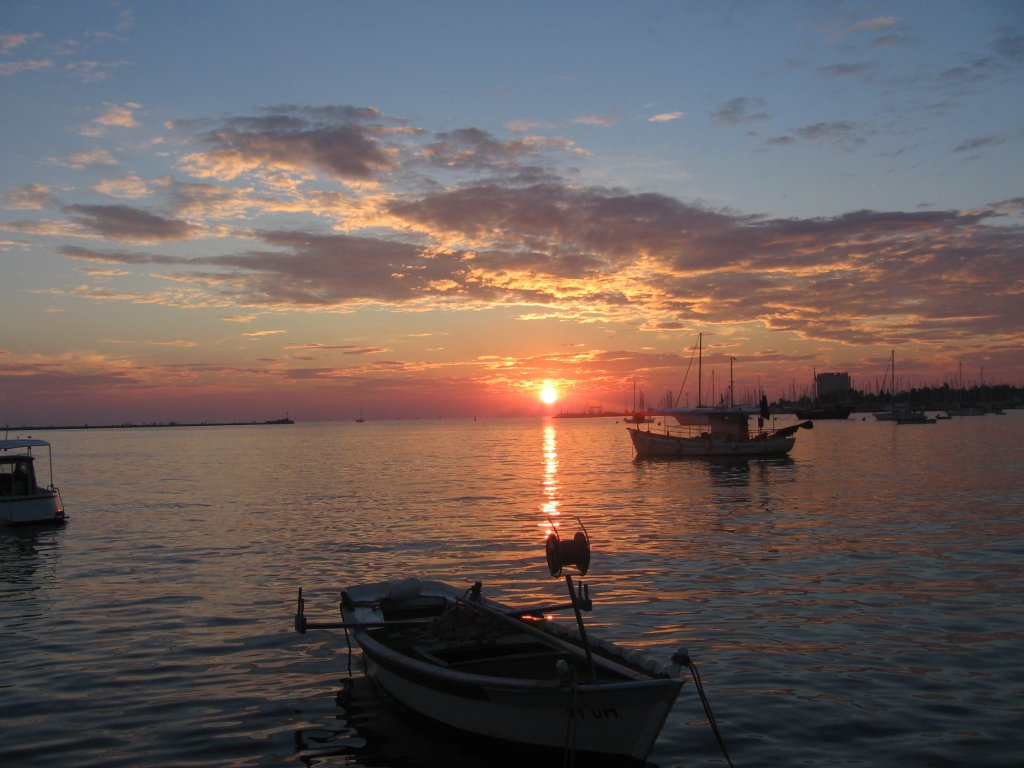
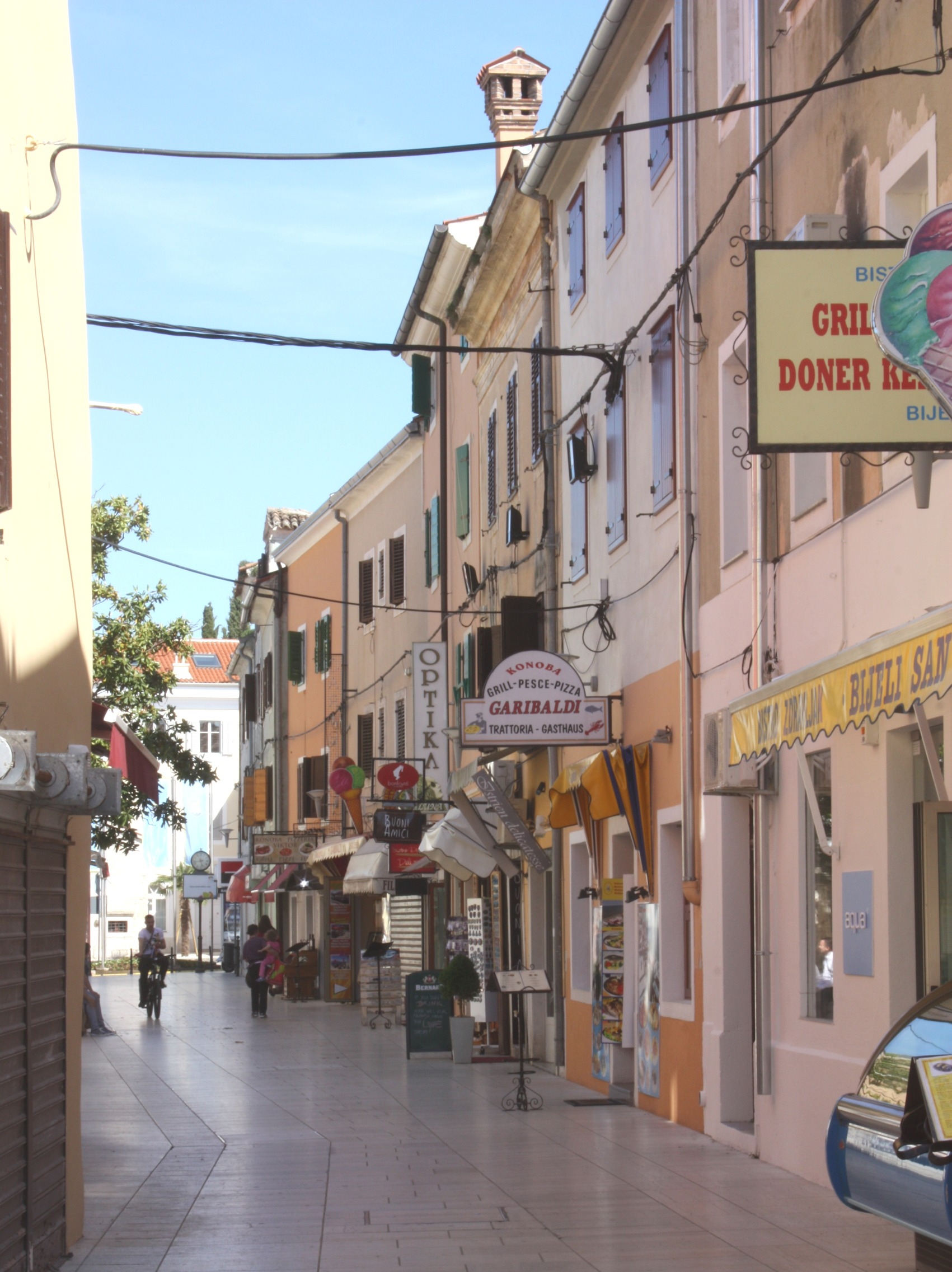
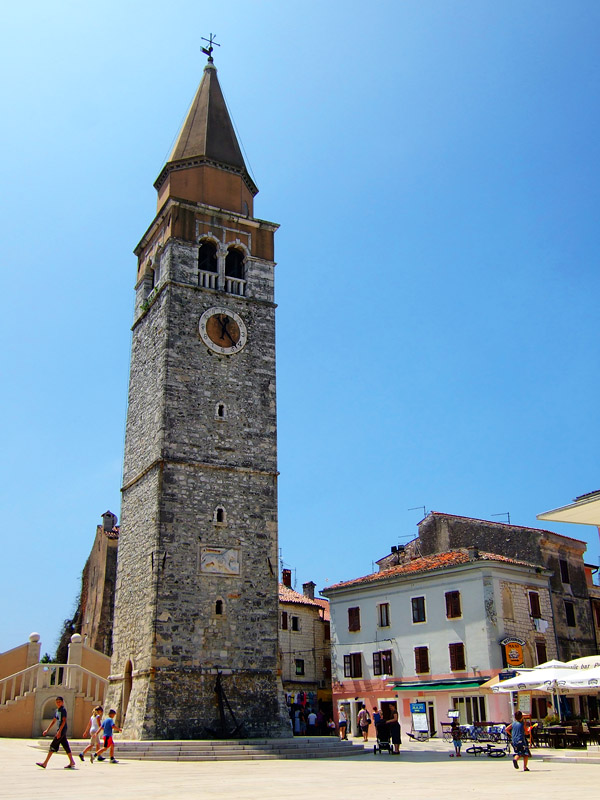
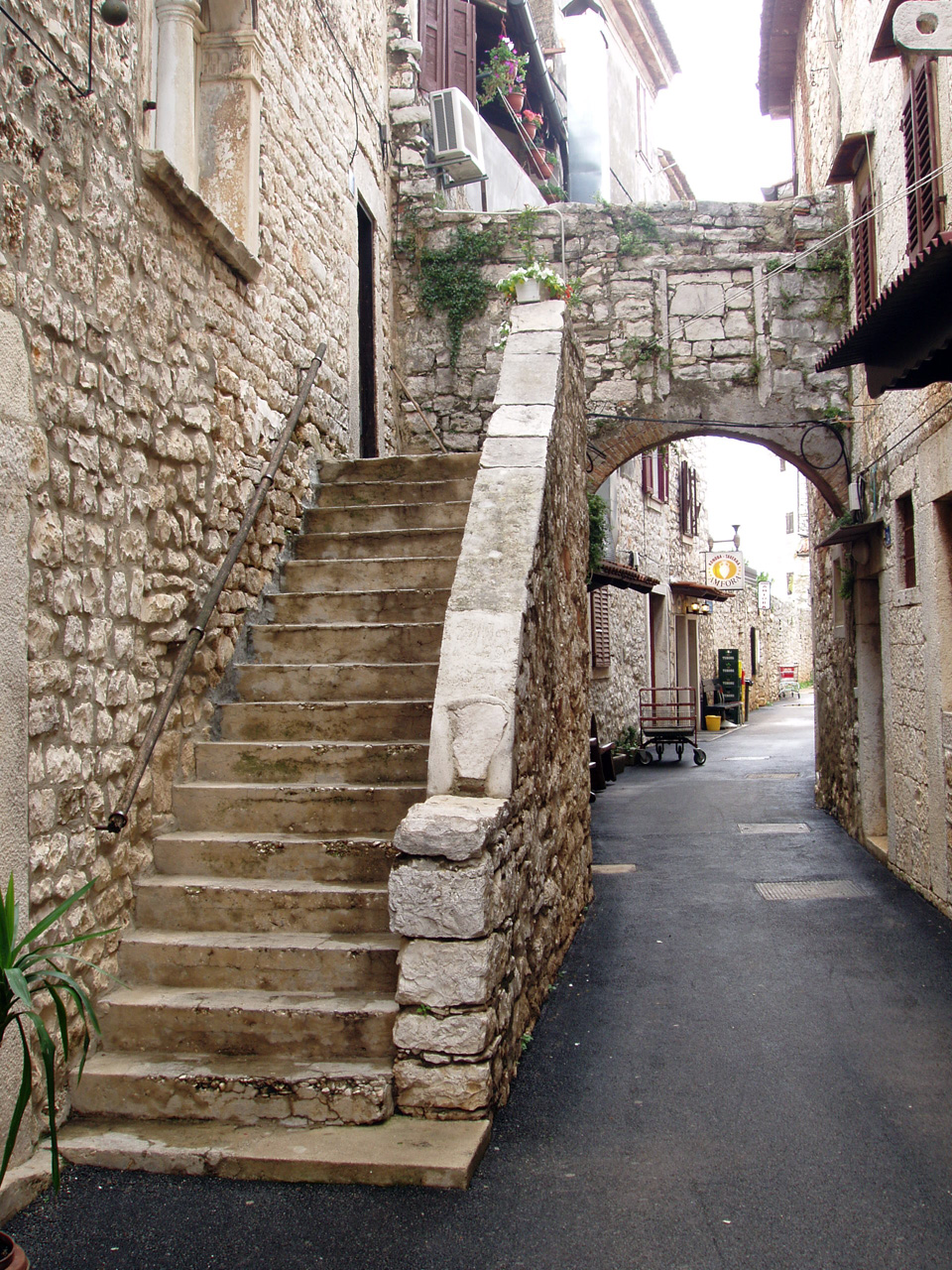
- Umag

- Flag

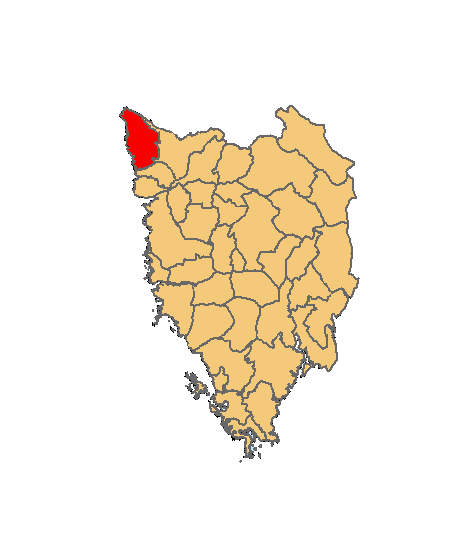
- Location of Umag in Istria

- Location within Croatia
- Coordinates: 45°26′N 13°31′E
- Country: Croatia
- Region: Istria
- County: Istria County

Government
  - Mayor: Vili Bassanese (SDP)

Area
  - Town: 31.7 sq mi (82.2 km^{2})
  - Urban: 2.4 sq mi (6.3 km^{2})
- Elevation: 0 ft (0 m)

Population (2021)
  - Town: 12,699
  - Density: 400/sq mi (154/km^{2})
  - Urban: 6,751
  - Urban density: 2,800/sq mi (1,100/km^{2})
- Time zone: UTC+1 (CET)
  - Summer (DST): UTC+2 (CEST)
- Postal code: 52470
- Area code: 052
- Website: umag.hr

Umag (pronounced [ûmaɡ]; Italian: Umago; Venetian: Umago) is a coastal town in Istria, Croatia. Located in the northwestern part of Croatia, near the border with Slovenia, situated on the Adriatic Sea in the county of Istria. Umag is known for its historic old town, Mediterranean climate, and tourism industry. The town has a long history dating back to Roman times and developed as an important regional settlement due to its strategic coastal position.

Today, Umag is recognized as a popular tourist destination, featuring marinas, beaches, and sports facilities, particularly for tennis. It hosts the annual Croatia Open, an ATP Tour international tennis tournament that attracts players and visitors from around the world. The local economy is largely based on tourism, agriculture, fishing, and hospitality services. Its patron saint is St. Peregrine.

== History ==
Umag was mentioned for the first time in the 7th century by an anonymous citizen from Ravenna, but it already existed in Roman times. Proof of this is found in the numerous remains of Roman villas, the so-called villa rustica uncovered all along the coast. The town's history is closely linked to the settlement of Sipar, whose ruins can be found on a narrow cape four kilometres north of Umag. In the 9th century, the fortified settlement of Sipar was devastated by invaders, the Neretva pirates. However, after this unfortunate incident Umag grew in significance thanks also to its location, a small islet separated from the mainland by a narrow channel. It was actually this location that safeguarded the settlement from the continuous invasions down through the centuries. The Roman period of relative prosperity was interspersed with one of insecurity caused primarily by frequent invasions, outbreaks of plague, cholera, and malaria. The number of its inhabitants declined rapidly. Umag became part of the reigns of Odoacer, Theodoric, and was also ruled by the Langobards.

From the 6th to the 8th centuries it fell under Byzantine dominion, followed by the rule of the Lombards in 751 and Francs in 774. The subsequent period was marked by insecurity and frequent changes of government ranging from the Patriarchs of Grado and Aquileia to the Bishops of Trieste. However, the increasingly powerful Venetian Republic imposed its rule over Istria, forcing Umag and other western Istrian towns to swear loyalty to Venice. In fact, in 1269, the Commune of Umag swore loyalty to Venice which from that time on 1797 was to appoint governors of Umag from among its nobility. This period was by no means a peaceful one.

Century-old clashes with Genoa brought about more destruction and looting. In 1370 the Genoese navy attacked Umag, destroying the town's archive. The outbreaks of plague that decimated the inhabitants forced the Venetian authorities to consider colonising the area with new settlers, mainly from the territories threatened by Turkish invasions. The harbour of Umag was utilised for loading agricultural surplus from the hinterland. Up to the collapse of Venice Umag had lived like other Istrian towns. Its communal arrangement was guaranteed by Statute from 1541.

With the fall of the Venetian Republic, Umag, like the entire eastern Adriatic coast, came under the rule of France until 1815 when it passed over to Austria until 1918. With the end of World War I Istria became part of Italy. After World War II, the flaring up of the Trieste crises resulted in the establishment of the Free Territory of Trieste, while Umag became part of Zone B governed by the Yugoslav Army, and eventually became part of SR Croatia within SFR Yugoslavia in 1954. After Umag became part of Yugoslavia, there was an exodus of many Italians from the town, who, until then, had constituted the majority of its population.

In 1993, with the establishment of the new local rule, Umag became an independent municipality, and, in 1997, was awarded the status of town (grad).

== Geography ==
It is the westernmost town of Croatia, and it includes Bašanija, the westernmost point of Croatia.

== Demographics ==
According to the 2021 census, its population was 12,699 with 6,751 living in the city proper.

In 2011, Umag had a population of 7,281, with a total municipal population of 13,467. Like many other towns in Istria, Umag has a multi-ethnic population. Croats have an absolute majority of 59.6%; Italians 18.3%, Serbs 3.8%, Slovenes 2.2%, Bosniaks 1.7%, Albanians 1.3% and those regionally declared (as Istrians) make up the final 1.57%. In 1921, 93% of the commune residents used Italian as their habitual language. This does not mean that all residents were ethnic Italians at the time. Croatians also used Italian as their primary language in official contexts.

Town of Umag: Population trends 1857–2021
v

population	3503	3775	4536	5071	5689	6548	6858	7704	7103	6896	7554	8160	9936	12348	12901	13467	12699
	1857	1869	1880	1890	1900	1910	1921	1931	1948	1953	1961	1971	1981	1991	2001	2011	2021

Sources: Croatian Bureau of Statistics publications

=== Settlements ===
The list of settlements in the Municipality of Umag.

- Babići / Babici
- Bašanija / Bassania
- Crveni Vrh / Monterosso
- Čepljani / Ceppiani
- Đuba / Giubba
- Finida / Finida
- Juricani / Giurizzani
- Katoro / Cattoro
- Kmeti / Metti
- Križine / Cresine
- Lovrečica / San Lorenzo
- Materada / Matterada
- Monterol / Monterol
- Murine / Morino
- Petrovija / Petrovia
- Savudrija / Salvore
- Seget / Seghetto
- Sveta Marija na Krasu / Madonna del Carso
- Umag / Umago
- Valica / Valizza
- Vardica / Vardizza
- Vilanija / Villania
- Zambratija / Zambrattia

=== Language ===
Although the Government of the Republic of Croatia does not guarantee official Croatian-Italian bilinguialism, the statute of Umag itself does. Preserving traditional Italian place names and assigning street names to Italian historical figures is legally mandated and carried out.

Panoramic view of Umag from south

== Economy ==
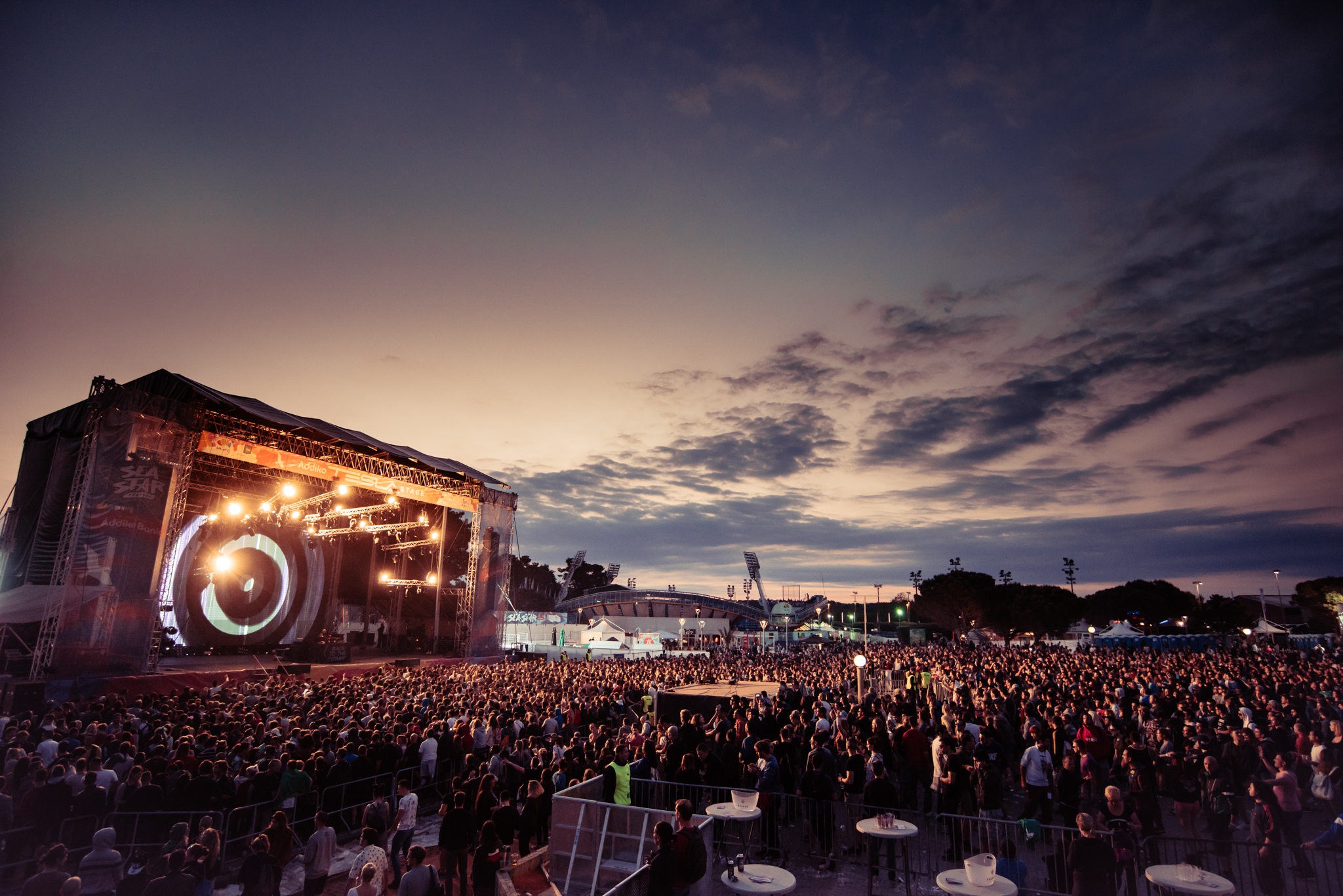
2017 Sea Star Festival

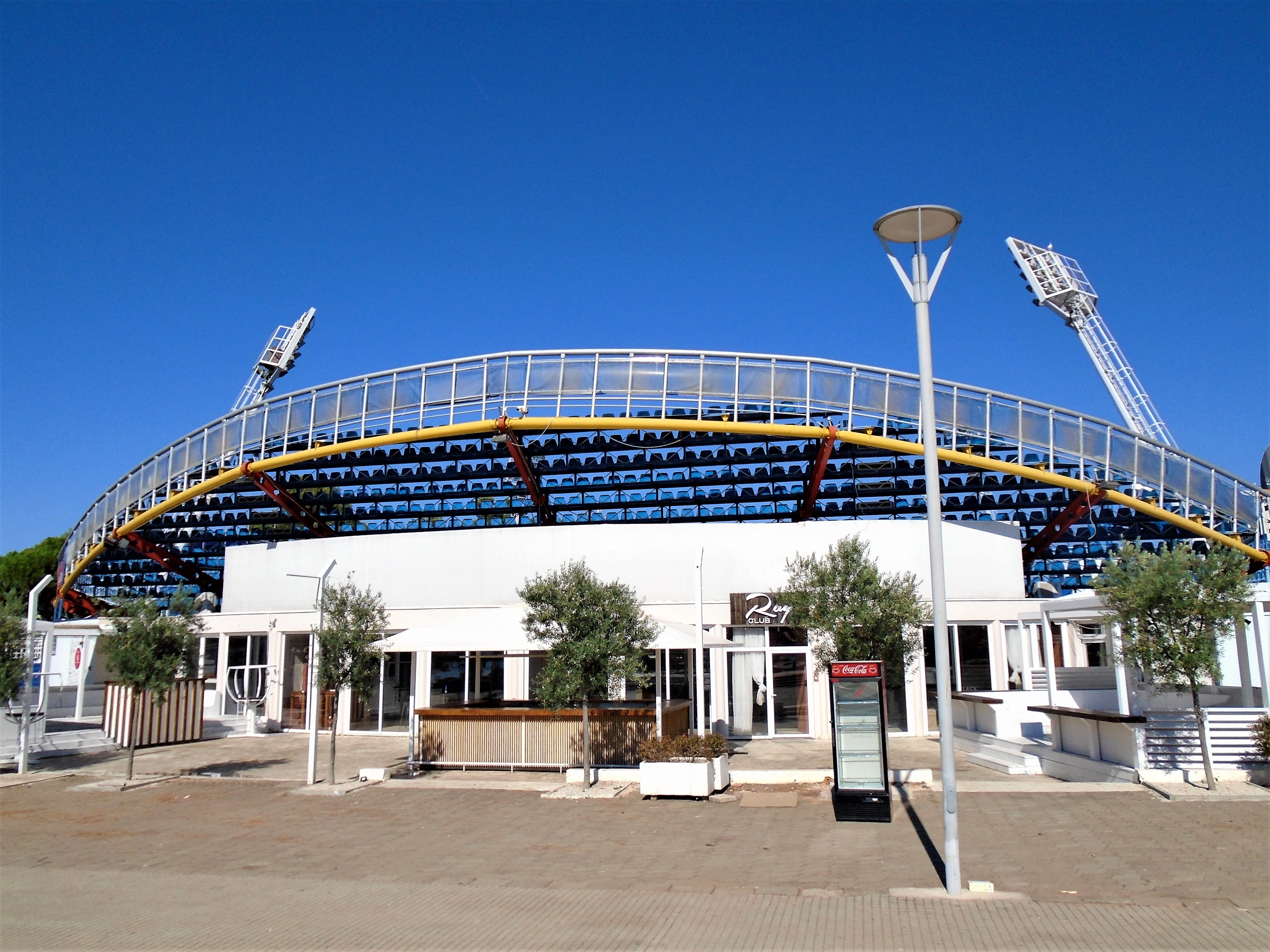
Stella Maris stadium for Croatia Open

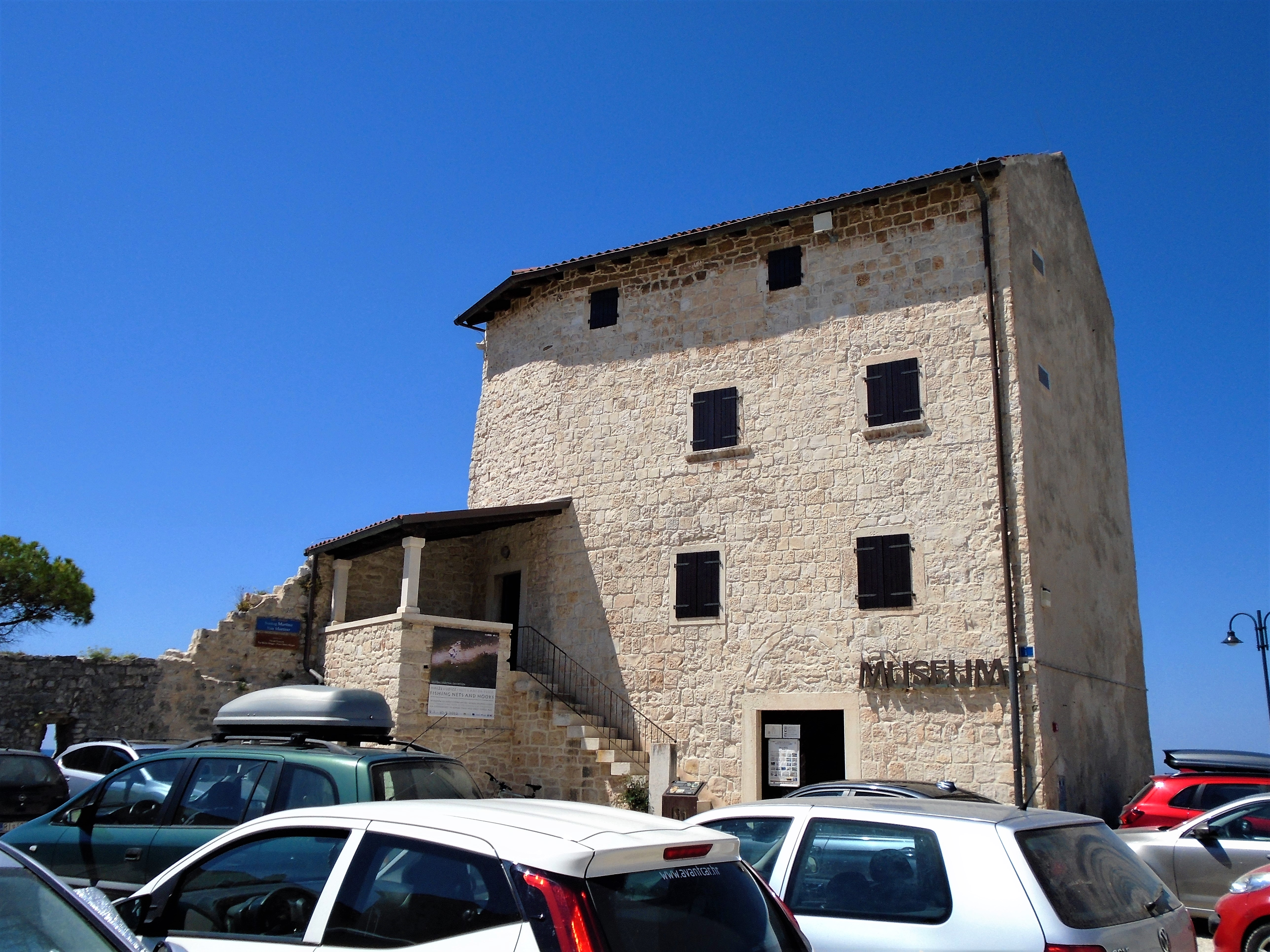
Town Museum

The natural features of the area have considerably influenced the development of the economy as a whole. The geographical location of Umag, in particular, has ensured an intensive and dynamic growth of the tourist industry after World War II, which has been expanding rapidly ever since. The closeness of big west European markets and the rise in standard of East European countries have both accounted for the expansion of this economic branch which is tightly linked to other economic resources in the region the most significant being agriculture. The best fertile soil and the vast arable land in the area have fostered the production of traditional Mediterranean crops present in the region for thousands of years, with particular emphasis on olive growing and wine grape growing.

The latter accounts for a successful winemaking industry and the emerging in recent years of a number of highly renowned local wine makers that can be traced in the wine chart of Istria. Linked with agriculture is the rapidly expanding tourist branch agro-tourism which has not only enriched the tourist offer but is also committed to preserving the old-world values of the region. Apart from that, mention must be made of the "Podravka" food factory in Umag where huge quantities of tomatoes were processed. The factory was closed in 2023 which marked the end of tomato growing industry in this part of Istria. The food industry started in Umag in the early 20th century with the opening of the "Arrigoni" plant for packing fish and tomatoes and the building of a flour mill, the predecessor of today's bakery and biscuit factory.

Today new factories have grown up in two industrial zones (Ungarija and Kravlji rt), which are provided with the necessary infrastructure continuously rebuilt and enlarged. The economic growth of Umag is based on the stimulation and support of small and medium-sized firms and the establishment of business zones. For that purpose, the town authorities have set apart 355,200.00 kuna for the programme aimed at stimulating the growth of agriculture and businesses for the year 2002. Besides, Umag is the founding member of the "Istarska razvojna agencija" IDA (Istrian Development Agency), with its seat in Pula.

== Events ==
Umag hosts Sea Star Festival every May since 2017

The town hosts an annual ATP tennis tournament on clay courts.
