= Seget, Istria County =

Seget Seghetto
- Village
- Location within Croatia
- Coordinates: 45°24′40″N 13°32′35″E
- Country: Croatia
- County: Istria County
- Municipality: Umag

Area
  - Total: 2.2 sq mi (5.7 km^{2})

Population (2021)
  - Total: 178
  - Density: 81/sq mi (31/km^{2})
- Time zone: UTC+1 (CET)
  - Summer (DST): UTC+2 (CEST)
- Postal code: 52470 Umag
- Area code: 052

Seget (Italian: Seghetto) is a village in Umag municipality in Istria County, Croatia.

== Demographics ==
According to the 2021 census, its population was 178. It was 190 in 2001.
