= Križine =

Križine Cresine, Crisine
- Village
- Location within Croatia
- Coordinates: 45°23′49″N 13°32′24″E
- Country: Croatia
- County: Istria County
- Municipality: Umag

Area
  - Total: 0.31 sq mi (0.8 km^{2})

Population (2021)
  - Total: 173
  - Density: 560/sq mi (220/km^{2})
- Time zone: UTC+1 (CET)
  - Summer (DST): UTC+2 (CEST)
- Postal code: 52470 Umag
- Area code: 052

Križine (Italian: Cresine or Crisine) is a village in Umag municipality in Istria County, Croatia.

== Demographics ==
According to the 2021 census, its population was 173. It was 200 in 2001.
