= Juricani =

Juricani Giurizzani
- Village
- Location within Croatia
- Country: Croatia
- County: Istria County
- Municipality: Umag

Area
  - Total: 1.1 sq mi (2.8 km^{2})

Population (2021)
  - Total: 396
  - Density: 370/sq mi (140/km^{2})
- Time zone: UTC+1 (CET)
  - Summer (DST): UTC+2 (CEST)
- Postal code: 52470 Umag
- Area code: 052

Juricani (Italian: Giurizzani di Materada) is a small village in Croatia. It is officially a part of the city of Umag (Italian: Umago), which is a coastal city in Istria, Croatia.

== History ==
The region had been part of the Venetian Republic form the 9th century to 1797, when it became part of the Habsburg monarchy, from 1805 on briefly was under Napoleonic rule and from 1814 to 1918 was part of the Austrian Empire. Many citizens of the village and neighboring city were Istrian Italians, also during the 19th century. Following the First World War, the village and neighboring city became part of Italy. From 1947 to 1954 they belonged to the independent Free Territory of Trieste, and then were incorporated into socialist Yugoslavia.

== Demographics ==
According to the 2021 census, its population was 396.

According to the 2001 census, Juricani had a total population of 413 people. Of this, 194 are male, while the remaining 219 are women. It was still 413 in 2011.
