= Sveti Andrija, Komiža =

Croatian Island

Sveti Andrija
- Village
- Location within Croatia
- Coordinates: 43°01′38.39″N 15°44′59.24″E
- Country: Croatia
- County: Split-Dalmatia County
- Municipality: Komiža

Area
  - Total: 4.3 km^{2} (1.7 sq mi)

Population (2021)
  - Total: 2
  - Density: 0.47/km^{2} (1.2/sq mi)
- Time zone: UTC+1 (CET)
  - Summer (DST): UTC+2 (CEST)

Sveti Andrija is a village on the Croatian island of Svetac, located in the Adriatic Sea. The island has been slowly depopulated, with its maximum population being achieved in 1953, this number being 64 inhabitants.
