= Blue Grotto (Biševo) =

Waterlogged sea cave the island of Biševo, Croatia

Coordinates: 42°57′N 16°0′E

- Modra špilja
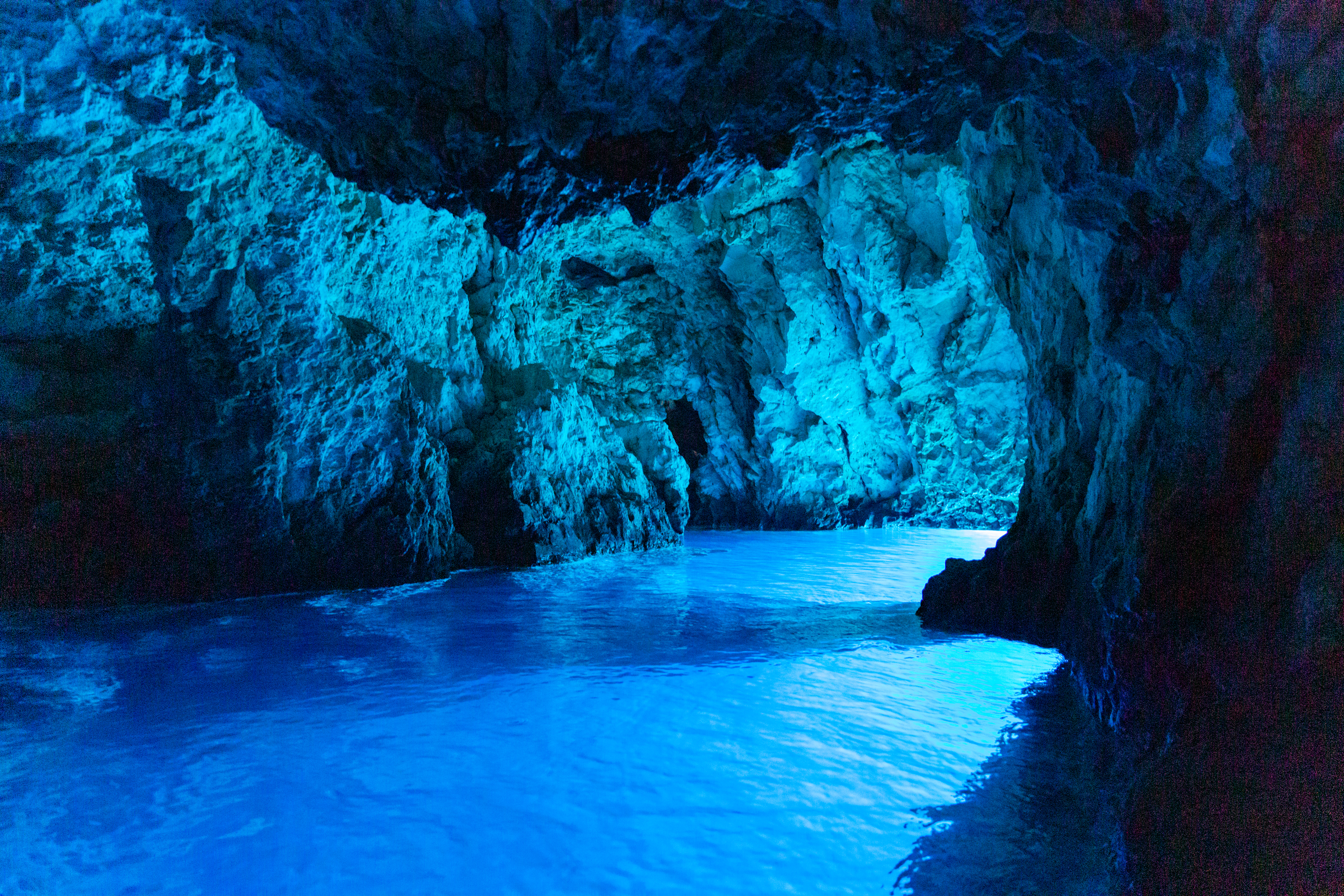
- The Blue Grotto
- Interactive map of Blue Grotto
- Location: Biševo, Croatia
- Depth: 10–12 m
- Length: 24 m
- Geology: Sea cave
- Access: By boat

The Blue Grotto or Blue Cave (Croatian: Modra špilja), is a flooded sea cave located in a small bay called Balun (Ball in the local dialect), on the east side of the island of Biševo and about 4.5 nautical miles (8.3 km) from Komiža, in the Croatian Adriatic. It is situated in the central Dalmatian archipelago, 5 km south-west of the island of Vis. The grotto is one of the best known natural beauty spots on the Adriatic and a popular show cave because of the glowing blue light that appears at certain times of day.

== The grotto ==
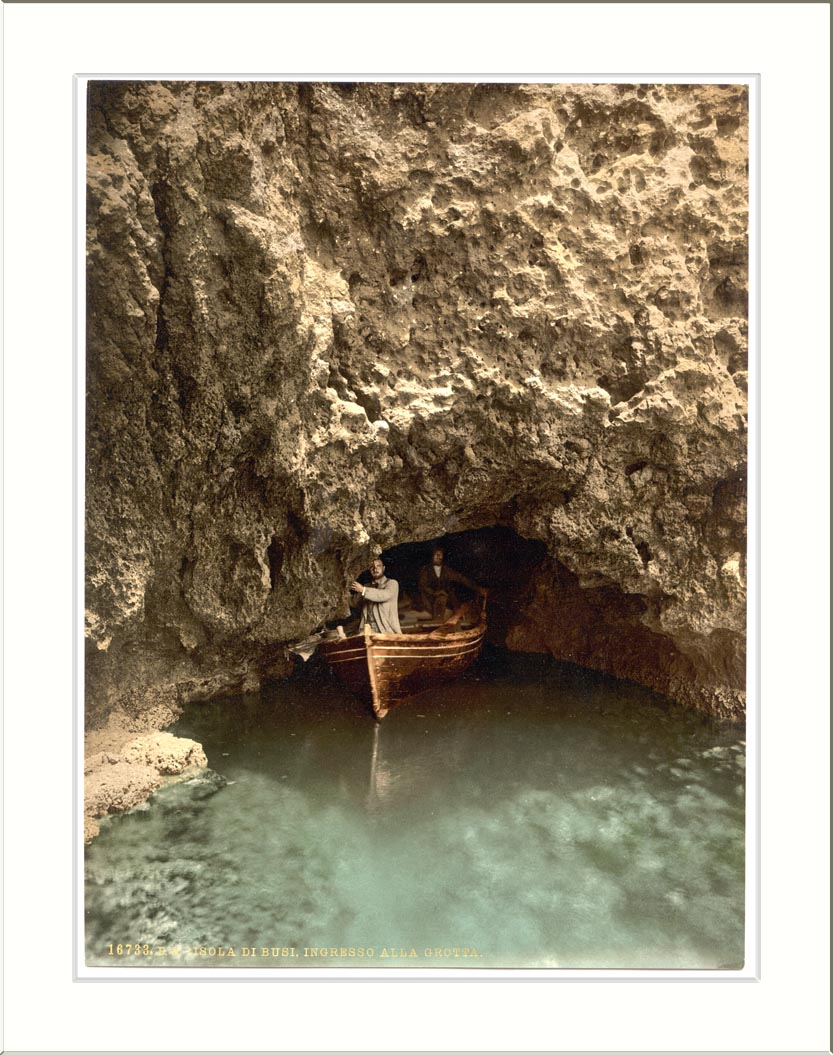
Picture of the cave in 19th century

First described and painted by Baron Eugen von Ransonet, the cave was originally accessible only by diving as it had one natural entrance below the sea level. Based on his suggestion, an artificial entrance large enough for small boats was built in 1884.

The natural entrance to the cave, located on its southern side, is said to resemble a vault on the ceiling of a grotto. It is through this submarine-like opening on the ceiling of the cave that sunlight gets in and creates an iridescent blue glowing effect all around the cave. As well, a stone bar, connecting two walls of the cave, is clearly visible just below the waterline, both in above-water photographs and in underwater photos.

Depending on the season, the ideal moment to visit the cave is between 11 AM and 12 noon. At this time of day the sunlight reflects through the water coming from the white floor of the cave and bathes the grotto in aquamarine light, while objects in the water appear to be silver. The Blue Grotto (Italian: Grotta Azzurra) on the island of Capri in Italy is also famous for this type of phenomenon.

The cave was formed by the wave action of the sea, as sea water eroded the limestone rock of which the whole island of Biševo is composed. The cave itself is 24 meters long, 10–12 metres deep and up to 15 metres high, while the entrance to it measures 1.5 metres high and 2.5 metres wide.

The cave receives more than 10,000 tourist visits every year, and tourist boats often include a visit to another similar cave on the island, the Zelena špilja (English: The Green Grotto), which is bigger in size and appears to be of an emerald-green tone due to a similar effect.

== See also ==
- Biševo
- Blue Grotto (Malta)
- Blue Grotto (Capri)
- List of Dinaric caves
- Show cave
- Island of Vis
