= Brusnik (island) =

Volcanic island in the Adriatic Sea

Coordinates: 43°00′N 15°48′E

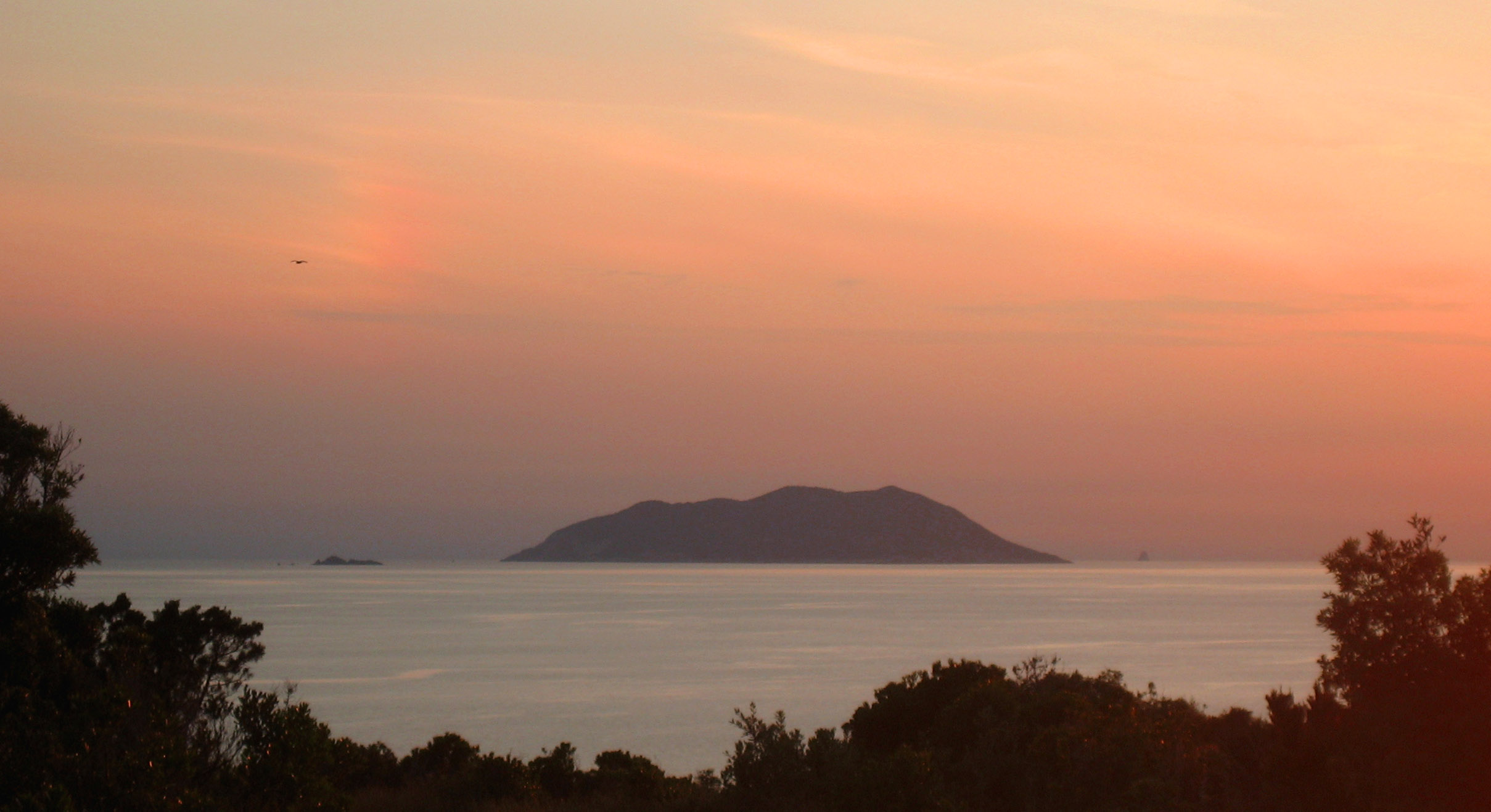
- Brusnik (left), Svetac middle, Jabuka right

- Location within Croatia
- Interactive map of Brusnik

Geography
- Location: Adriatic Sea
- Archipelago: Vis Islands
- Highest elevation: 30 m (100 ft)

Administration
- Croatia
- County: Split-Dalmatia County

Brusnik is an uninhabited volcanic island in the Croatian part of the Adriatic Sea. The island is part of the Dalmatian archipelago.

== Name ==
The island's name comes from the word brus ("whetstone"), because volcanic rocks from the island were used for making whetstones.

== Location ==
The island is located 12 NM west of Komiža, town on island of Vis, and 2 NM south-west from the island of Svetac (Sv. Andrija).

The area of the island is 3 ha. Brusnik is 320 m long, 205 m wide, and has 30 meter high cliffs. The east coast is steep and difficult to reach, while the west coast is glacis toward the sea.

== Flora and fauna ==
In 1951, the island was declared a geological monument of nature. On the island, there is the endemic species of black lizard (Podarcis melisellensis melisellensis). The surrounding sea is rich with fish, especially blue fish.

=== Birds ===
Brusnik, along with Vis, Sveti Andrija and the neighbouring islet of Kamnik, Biševo, Jabuka and the Palagruža archipelago, forms part of the Croatian Offshore Islands Important Bird Area (IBA). This was designated as such by BirdLife International because it supports significant breeding populations of Scopoli's and Yelkouan shearwaters, as well as of Eleonora's falcons.

== See also ==
- Croatia
- Vis (island)
- Dalmatia

== Bibliography ==
- Bogdanović, Sandro; Mitić, Božena (October 2003). "The flora of the volcanic island of Brusnik (central Dalmatia, Croatia)" (PDF). Acta Botanica Croatica (in Croatian). 62 (2): 103–113.
- Šerić, Neven (2006). Biserna ogrlica - pučinski otoci srednjeg Jadrana (RTF) (in Croatian). Marjan tisak. ISBN 953-214-367-X.
