= Mount Hum (Vis) =

Mountain in Vis, Croatia

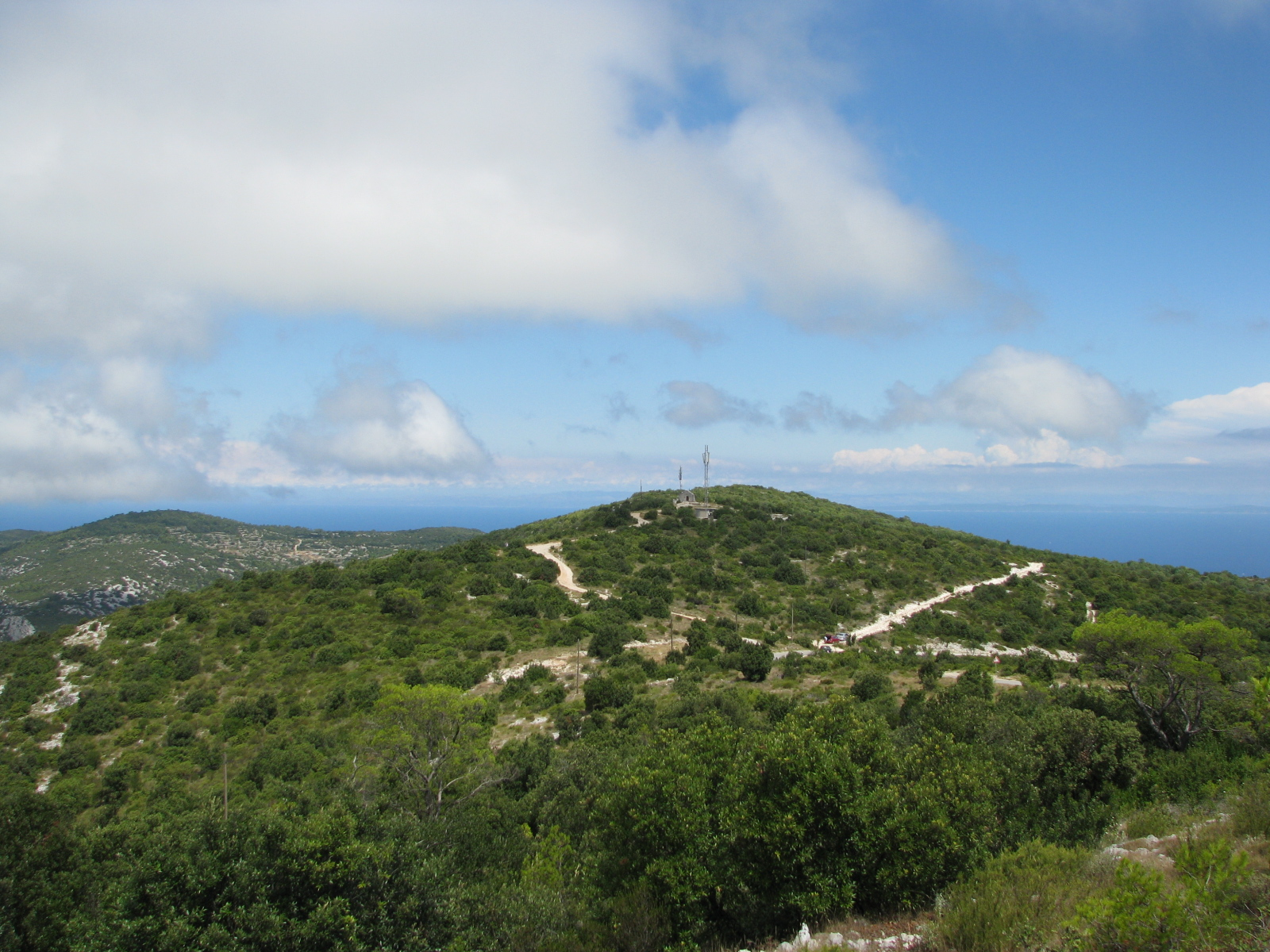
- View of Mount Hum

Highest point
- Elevation: 587 m (1,926 ft)
- Prominence: 587 m (1,926 ft)
- Coordinates: 43°01′56″N 16°06′57″E

Geography
- Location within Croatia
- Location: Croatia

Mount Hum (Croatian pronunciation: [xûːm]) is a mountain located on the island of Vis, Croatia. It is the highest elevation point of Vis with its 587 metres (1,926 ft). A military radar station is located on the top and the peak is not accessible to civilians.
