= Eugen von Ransonnet-Villez =

Eugen Freiherr Ransonnet von Villez
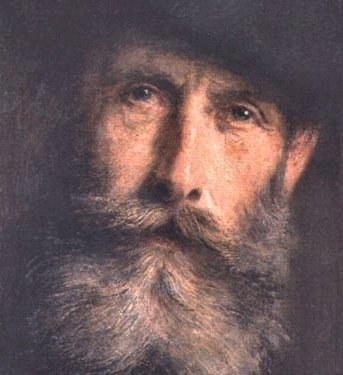
- Born: June 1838; Hietzing, near Vienna, Austrian Empire
- Died: June 28, 1926 (aged 87–88); Nußdorf am Attersee, Upper Austria, Austria
- Known for: Painting, Diving, Lithography, Exploration

Eugen von Ransonnet‑Villez (7 June 1838, Hietzing — 28 June 1926, Nußdorf am Attersee, Upper Austria) was an Austrian baron, diplomat, painter, lithographer, biologist, and explorer.

== Early Life and Background ==
He was the son of Geheimrat Karl Freiherr von Ransonnet‑Villez, vice‑president of the Supreme Audit Institution of Austria, and Margarethe, daughter of Field Marshal‑Lieutenant Franz Ludwig Count Bigot de Saint‑Quentin. At the age of eleven he began studies at Vienna’s Academy of Fine Arts and later studied law (1855–58) in Vienna. In 1858 he joined the Imperial Ministry of Foreign Affairs, beginning his diplomatic career. In his spare time, he pursued natural sciences, photography, painting, and especially chromolithography.

== Travels, diving bell, and underwater art ==
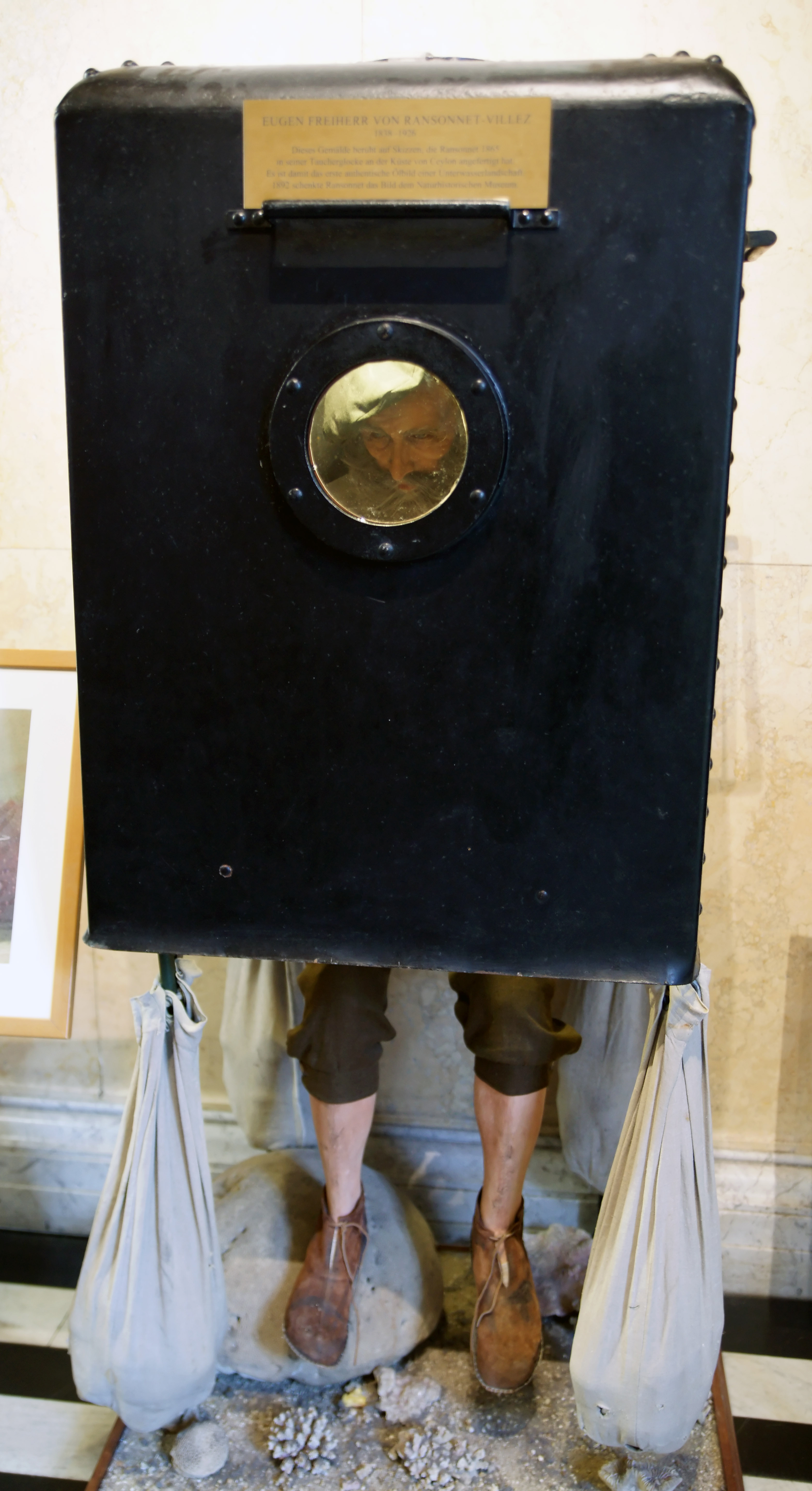
Diving bell by Eugen von Ransonnet-Villez, Natural History Museum Vienna

From around 1860 he traveled extensively—to Palestine, Egypt, India, and Japan—while serving as a diplomat. During this period he developed a diving bell to sketch underwater scenes directly. The bell featured a porthole, seating, weighted cannonballs for ballast, and an air supply line from a boat. He used it for underwater drawing in relatively shallow water, conducting dives off Ceylon (now Sri Lanka), the Red Sea, Gulf of Aqaba, Dalmatian coast, and the Attersee in Austria. He was the first known underwater artist.

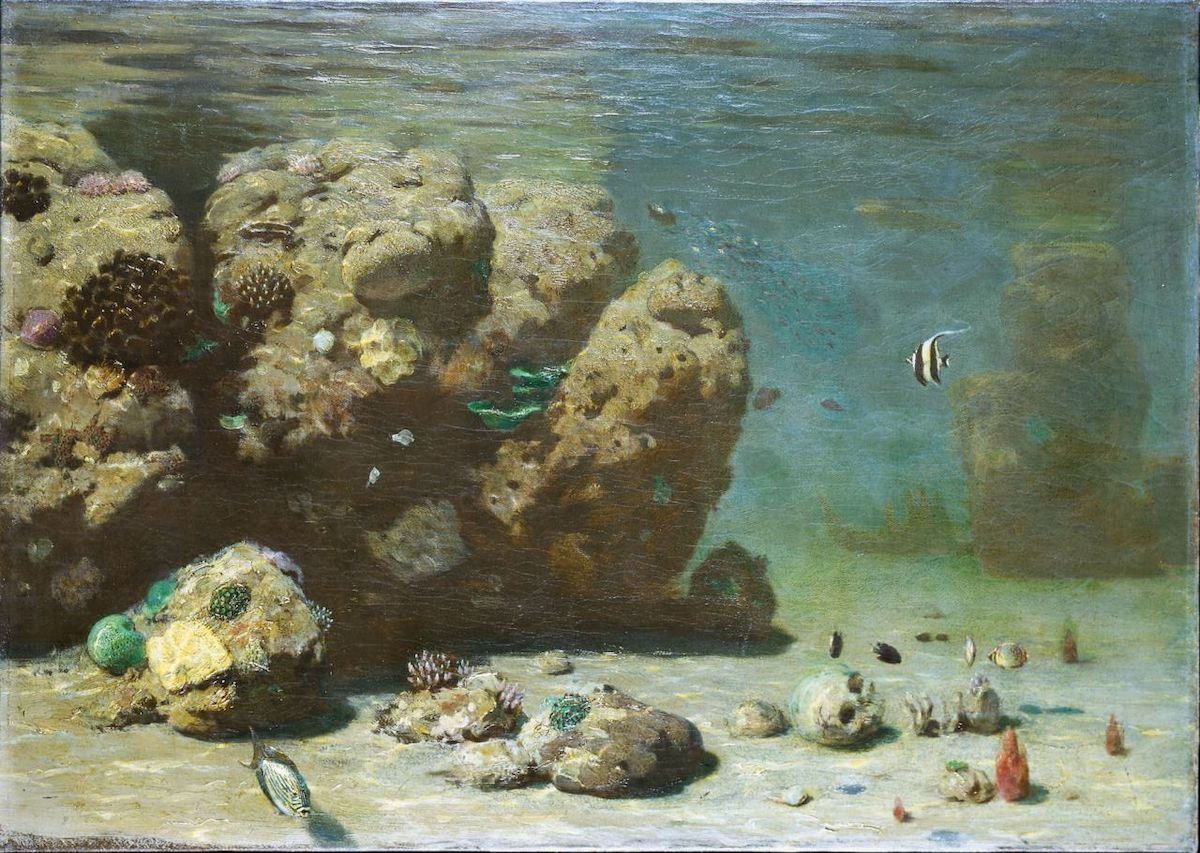
Oil painting by Eugen Ransonnet-Villez based on his submersible sketches, Natural History Museum Vienna

His experiments produced observations on how colors appeared under water, detailed in his publication Sketches of the inhabitants, animal life and vegetation ... of Ceylon ... submarine scenery (Vienna, 1867), including 22 tinted and four color lithographs.

== Later life and legacy ==
Between 1871 and 1873, Ransonnet‑Villez built a villa in Nußdorf am Attersee, decorated with exotic plants he had collected during his travels. He later helped develop tourism in the region and founded the Union Yacht Club Attersee in 1886. His daughter, Eugénie-Caroline, inherited the estate, and in 1956 she bequeathed it to the Diocese of Linz. It is now operated as a seminar hotel known as the Grafengut. A themed trail (Ransonnet‑Themenweg) with interpretive panels commemorates his legacy there.

His only remaining underwater oil painting, along with over 5,000 zoological specimens, were donated to the Natural History Museum in Vienna in 1892.

== Published works ==
- Reise von Kairo nach Tor zu den Korallenbänken des Rothen Meeres (Vienna, 1863)
- Sketches of Ceylon (1867)
- Skizzen aus Singapore und Johor (1868)
- Reisebilder aus Ostindien, Siam, China und Japan (Graz, 1912)

He also created the lithographs for Anton Kerner von Marilaun’s botanical work (Leipzig & Vienna, 1890–91)
