= Biševo =

Adriatic Sea island of Croatia

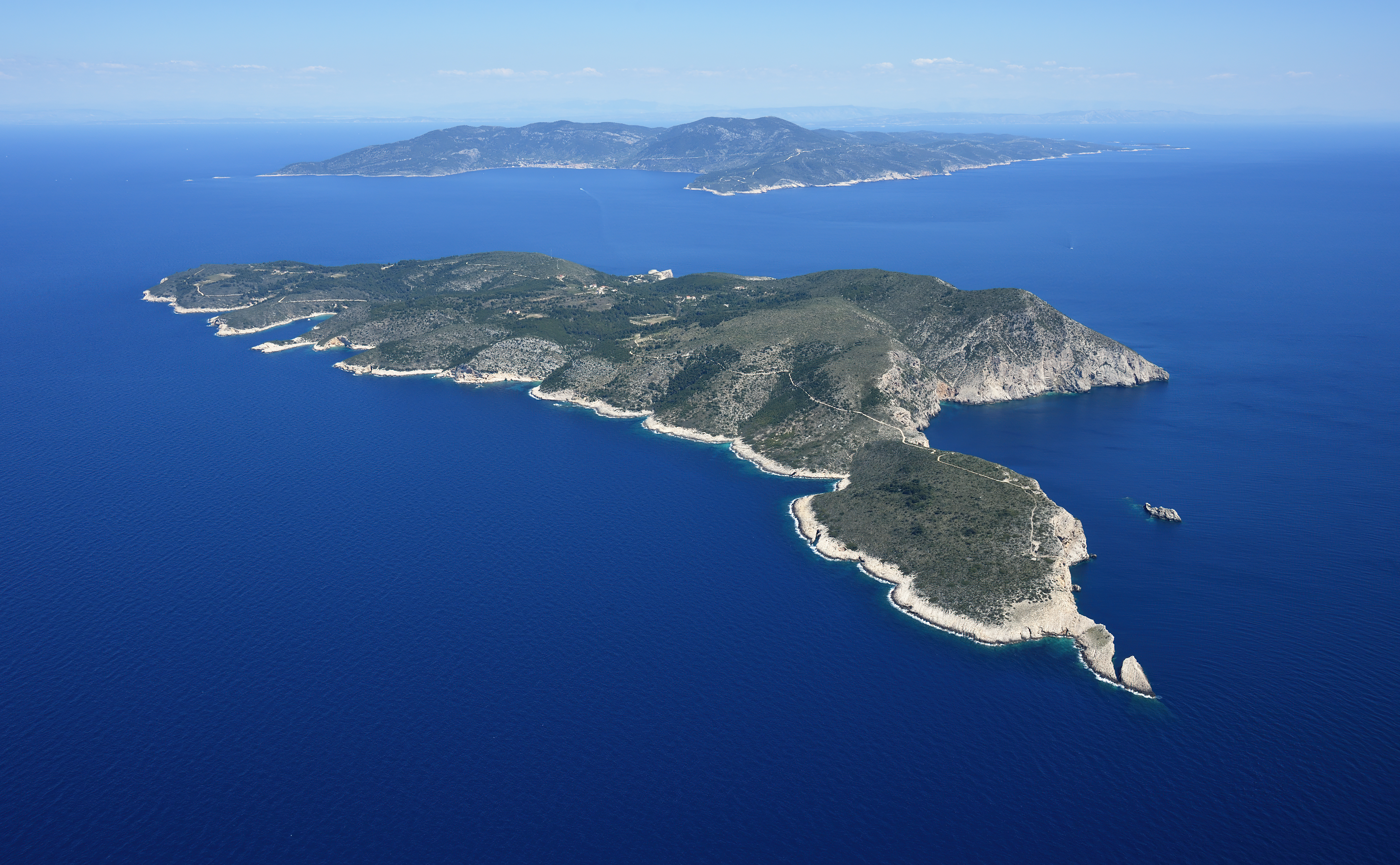
- Biševo island seen from an airplane

- Location within Croatia
- Interactive map of Biševo

Geography
- Location: Adriatic Sea
- Coordinates: 42°58′N 16°0′E
- Area: 5.8 km^{2} (2.2 sq mi)
- Highest elevation: 239 m (784 ft)
- Highest point: Stražbenica

Administration
- Croatia
- County: Split-Dalmatia County

Demographics
- Population: 15 (2011)
- Pop. density: 17.2/km^{2} (44.5/sq mi)

Biševo (pronounced [bîʃevo], Chakavian: Bisovo) is a Croatian island in the Adriatic Sea. It is situated in the middle of the Dalmatian archipelago, 5 km south-west of the Island of Vis. Its area is 5.8 km^{2} (2.2 mi^{2}) and it has a population of 15 (as of 2011).

== History ==
A Benedictine monastery was founded on Biševo in 1050 by Ivan Grlić from Split, but it was deserted two centuries later because of the danger of pirates. The church of Saint Sylvester is preserved near the ruins of the monastery.

There was a school on the island, built in 1947 and closed in 1961. Electricity was introduced in the 1970s.

== Geography ==
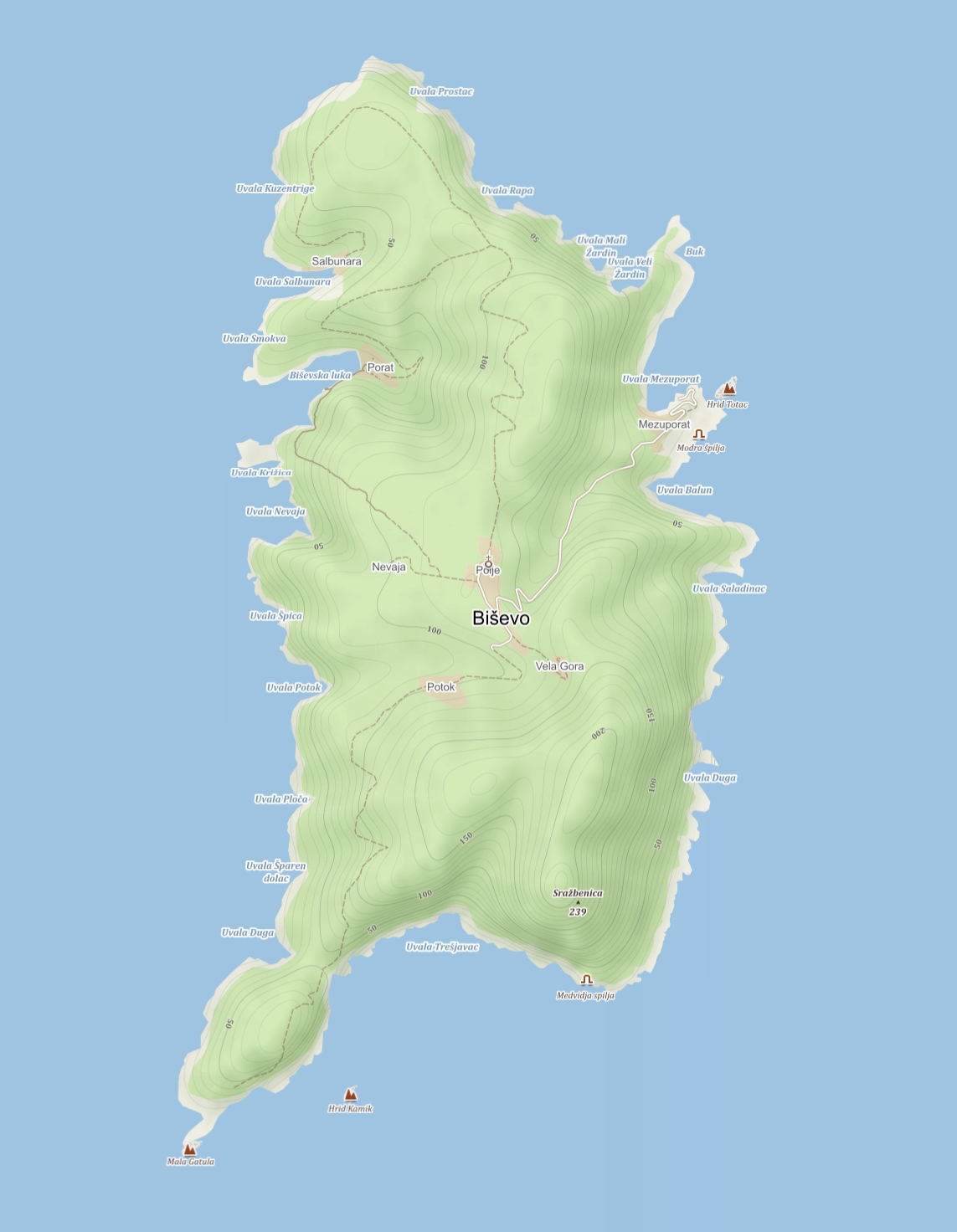
Topography of Biševo island

Biševo is composed of limestone. The highest point is Stražbenica, 239 metres (784 ft) high, accessible by a 45-minute walk along the footpath. In the center of the island there is a fertile field; the northern part of the island is covered with pine forests and the rest with maquis shrubland or bare rocks. The coastal sea belt is a rich fishing area. The main industries are viticulture and fishing.

=== Caves ===
==== Monk Seal Cave ====
Also known as Medvedina, the cave is lies on the south-east side of the island and has been protected since 1967. The name of the cave originates commemorates the Mediterranean monk seals, now an endangered species, which used to populated it. It is special geomorphologically because the entrance into the Monk Seal Cave is quite big and wide, it narrows completely towards the interior. The length of the cave is 160 m and it ends with a small beach that only small vessels, such as speedboats, can reach. This cave is difficult to spot when cruising away from the shore, due to the unusually narrow, almost vertical, 30 m high opening in the stone gorge. The interior of the cave consists of a main, spacious hall and a low winding canal which, after about 70 m, ends with a small beach. It is a well-known Dalmatian islands tourist attraction.

==== Blue Cave ====
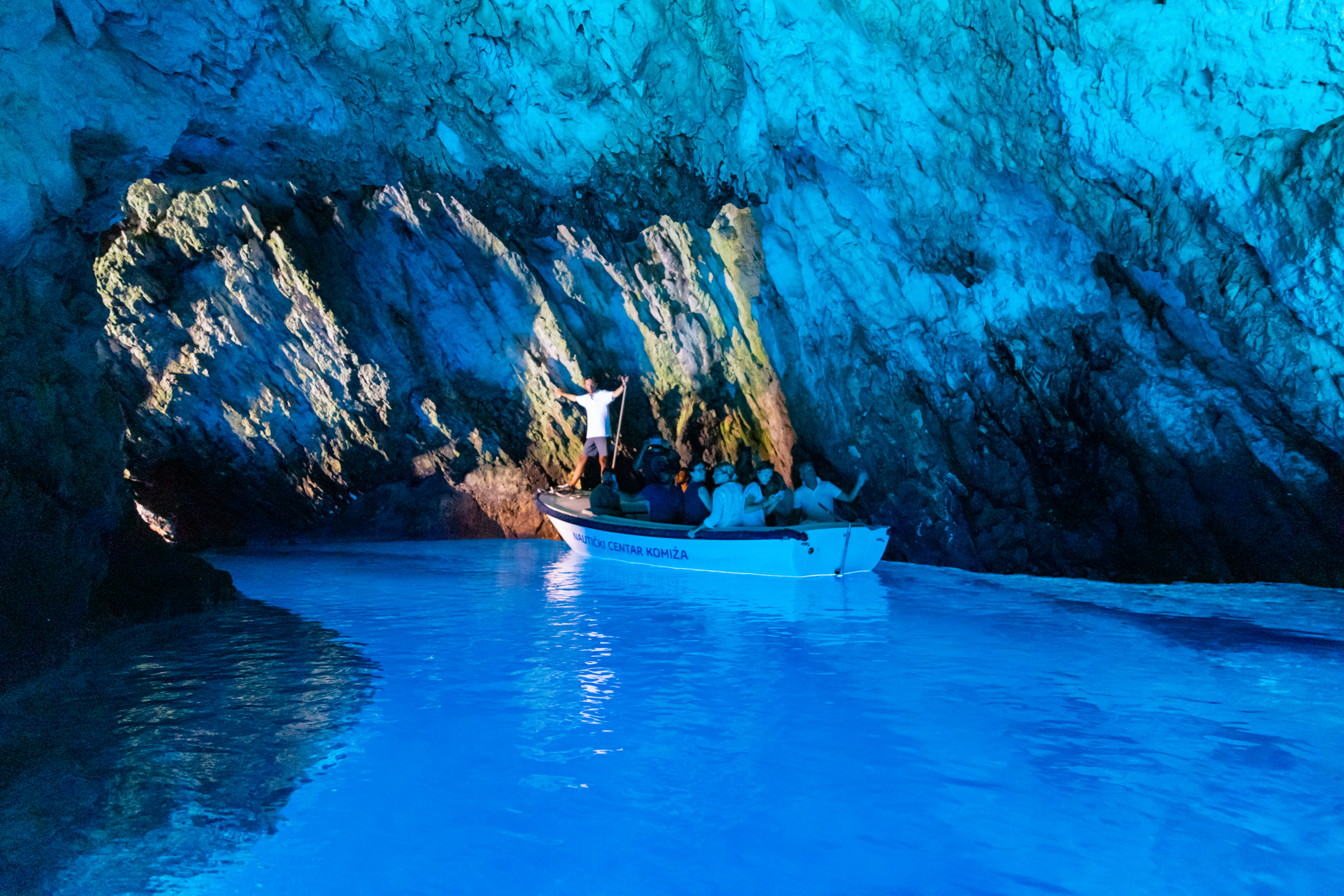
Blue cave

On the steep shores there are many caves, the most famous being Blue Cave, which was carved in the limestone by the sea. It is located on the eastern side of the island and is one of the most important attractions of the Adriatic. It was well known to local fishermen, who in 1884 showed it to the Austrian artist, explorer, and speleologist Eugen von Ransonnet-Villez, who published an article in the Viennese daily Neue Freie Presse declaring that its beauty surpassed even that of Capri's famed Blue Grotto. From that time on, it became a major tourist attraction.

The approach to the cave is only possible by boat. It is 18 metres (59 ft) long, 6 metres (20 ft) deep, and 6 metres (20 ft) high. The entrance to the cave is only 1.5 metres (4.9 ft) high and 2.5 metres (8.2 ft) wide. During the summer between 10 am and 1 pm, sunbeams penetrate the submarine opening in Blue Cave and are reflected from the white floor, colouring the cave blue and objects in the water silver.

== Birds ==
Biševo, along with Vis, Sveti Andrija and its neighbouring islet of Kamnik, Brusnik, Jabuka and the Palagruža archipelago, forms part of the Croatian Offshore Islands Important Bird Area (IBA). This was designated as such by BirdLife International because it supports significant breeding populations of Scopoli's and Yelkouan shearwaters, as well as of Eleonora's falcons.

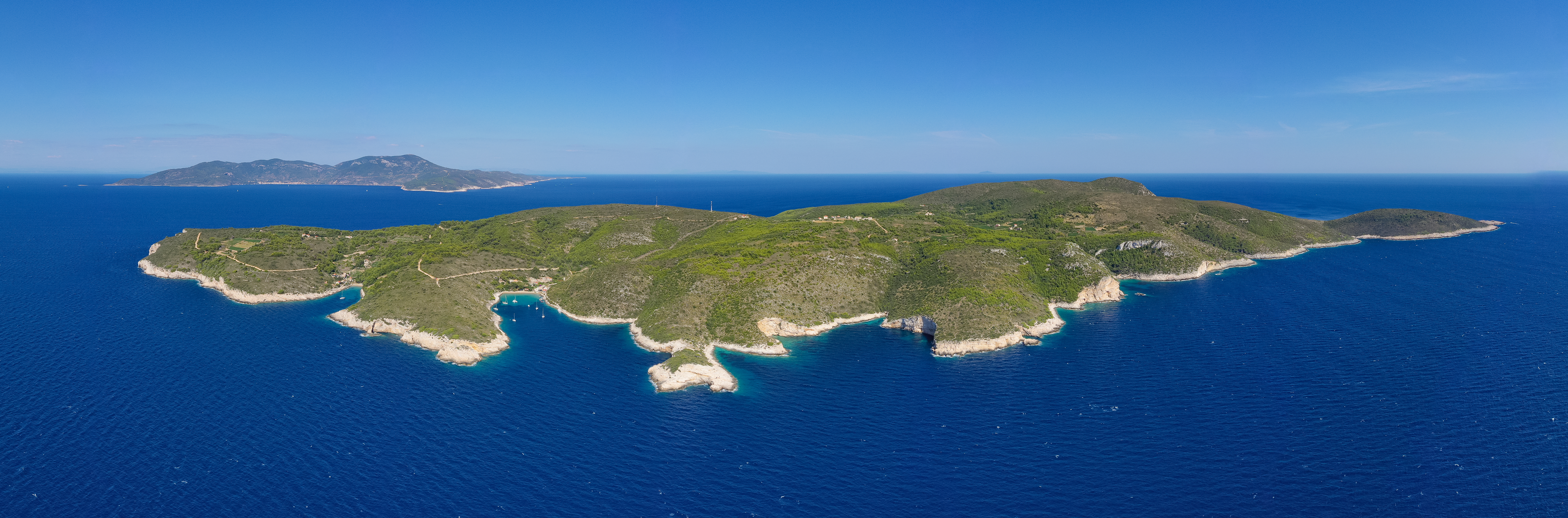
Panoramic view of Biševo island with Vis in the back

== Gallery ==
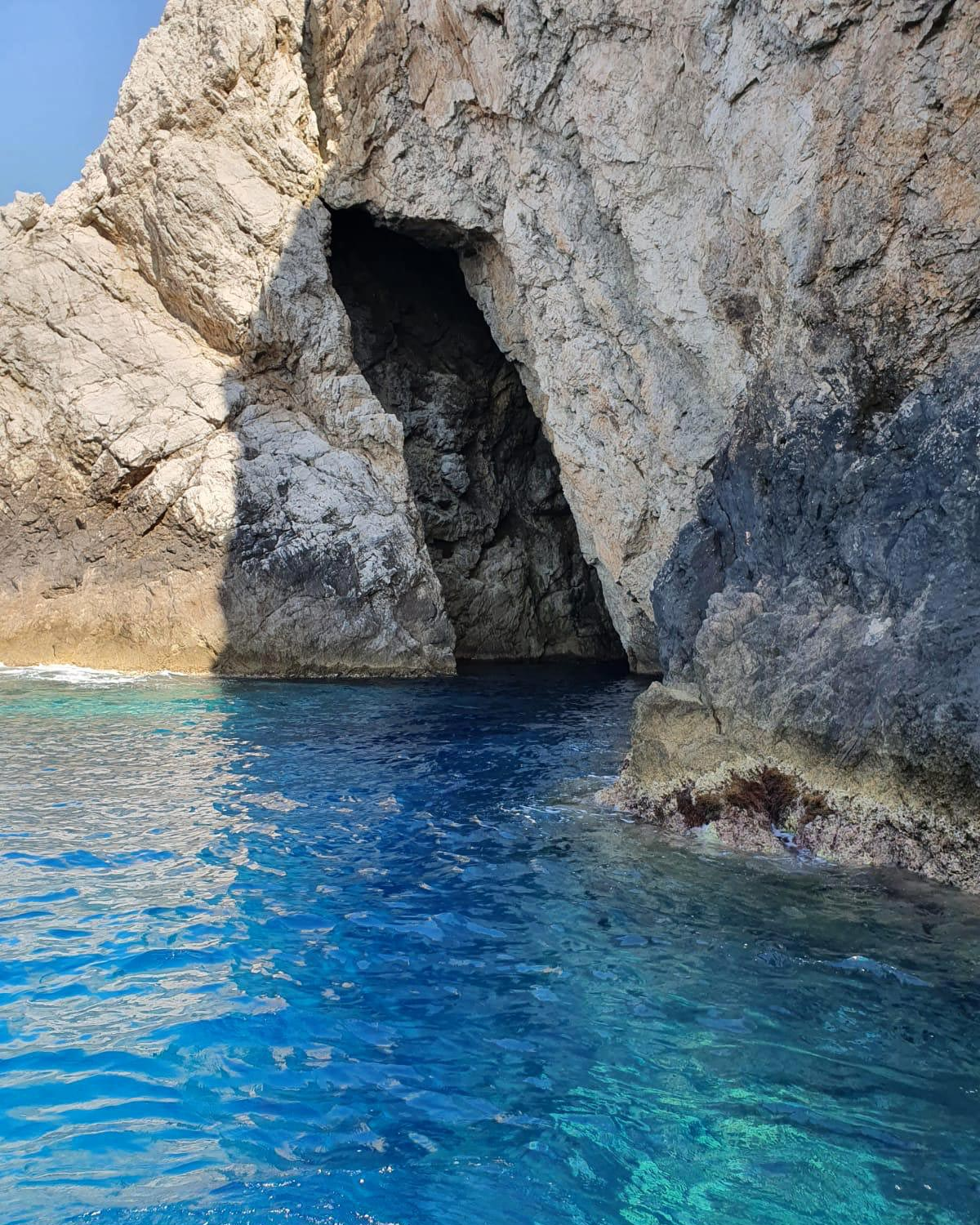
The Monk Seal Cave by Bisevo island seen from a boat

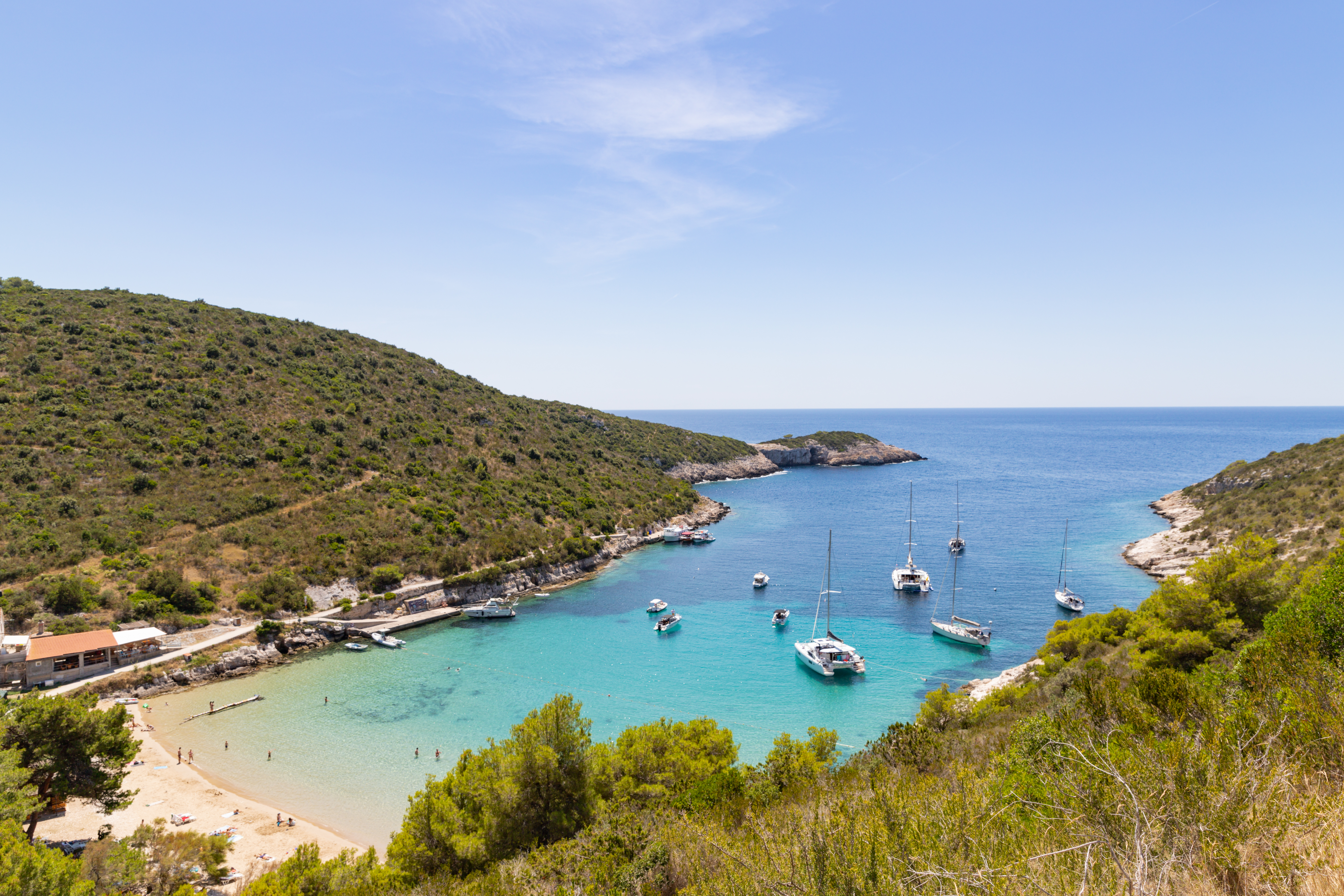
Porat beach

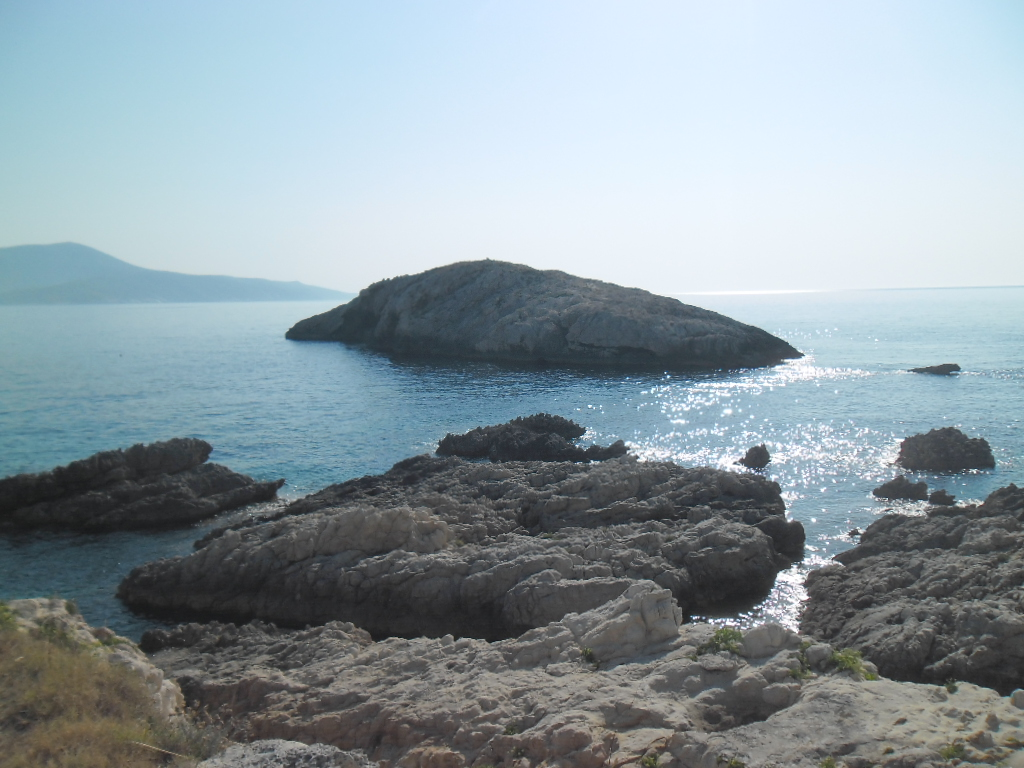
Islet Točac

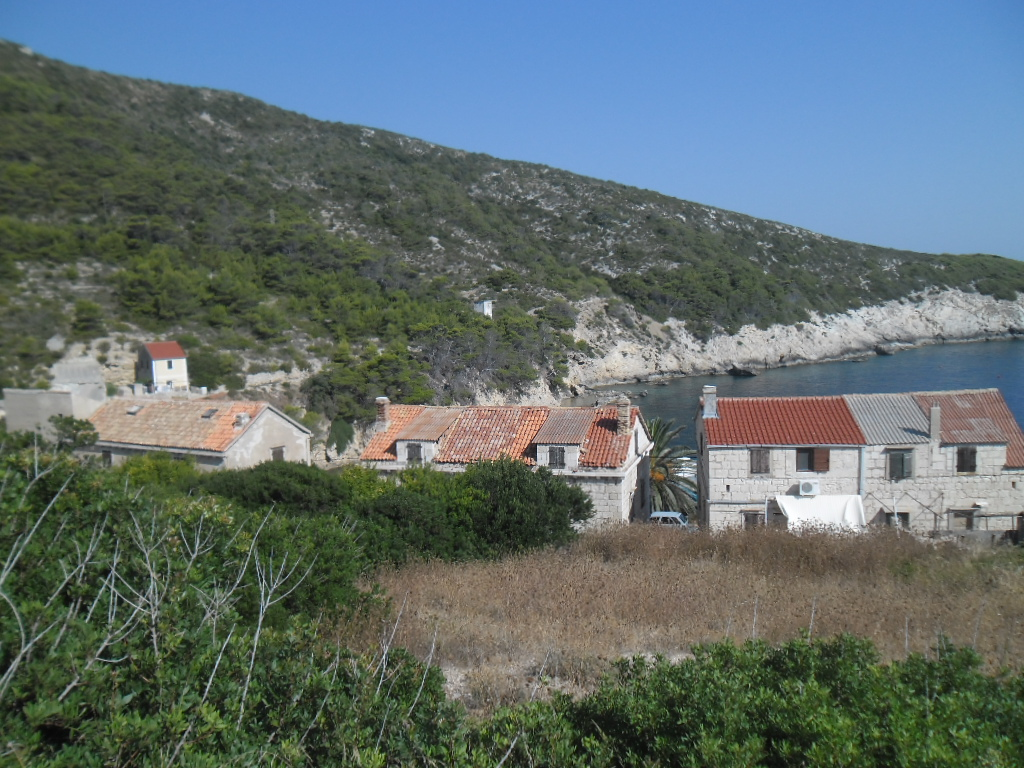
Houses on the island

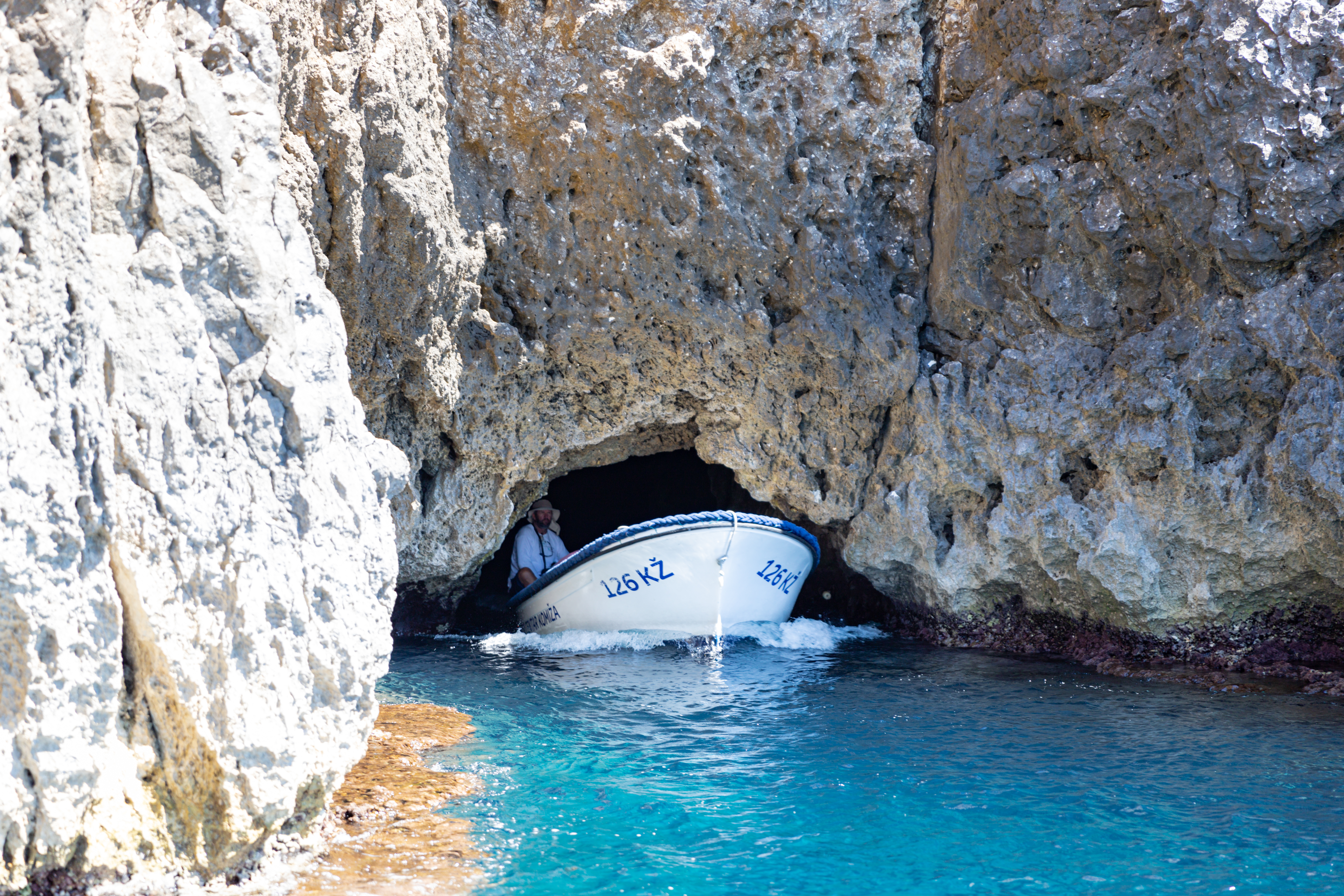
Entrance to the Blue cave

== See also ==
- Croatia
- Vis (island)
- Dalmatia

== Bibliography ==
- Šerić, Neven (2006). Biserna ogrlica - pučinski otoci srednjeg Jadrana (in Croatian). Marjan tisak. ISBN 953-214-367-X. Archived from the original (RTF) on 22 February 2014.
