= Jabuka–Andrija Fault =

Thrust fault under the Adriatic Sea in Croatia

The Jabuka–Andrija Fault is a seismically active thrust fault under the Adriatic Sea in Croatia. A 2003 series of earthquakes near Jabuka island, the strongest reaching a magnitude of 5.5, was caused by movements along the Jabuka–Andrija Fault.

== See also ==
- Jabuka (island)
- Svetac, an island also known as Sveti Andrija
