= Jabuka (island) =

Island in Croatia

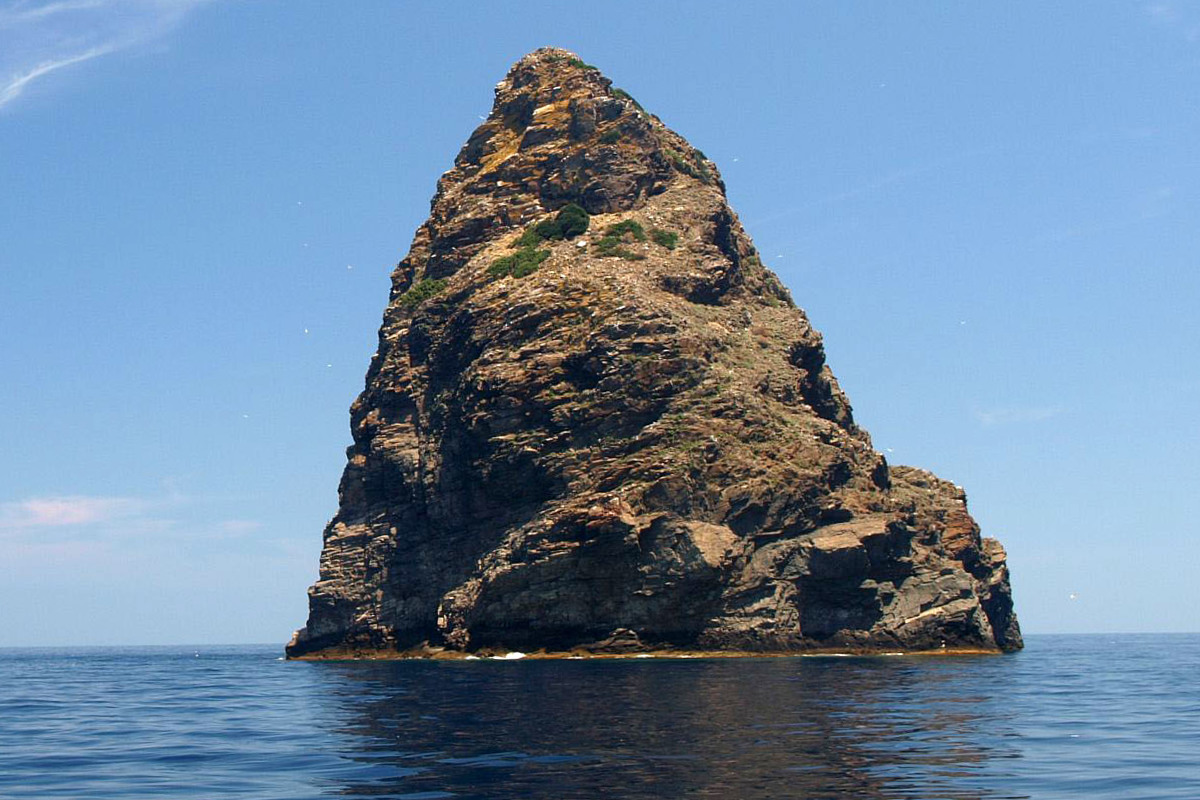
- Jabuka island

- Location within Croatia
- Interactive map of Jabuka

Geography
- Location: Adriatic Sea
- Coordinates: 43°05′30″N 15°27′37″E
- Archipelago: Vis Islands
- Highest elevation: 97 m (318 ft)

Administration
- Croatia
- County: Split-Dalmatia County

Jabuka (pronounced [jâbuka], which means apple in Croatian) is an uninhabited volcanic island in the Adriatic Sea, west of the island of Vis. It is part of the Dalmatian archipelago. The closest land masses are the small islands of Svetac and Brusnik. Jabuka is the furthest from the nearest land mass out of all Croatian islands.

== Geological features ==
Jabuka has 97-meter (318 ft) tall cliffs. The island is composed of igneous magnetite rocks, which cause magnetic anomalies that confuse compasses. Due to its iron-rich rock, Jabuka is frequently struck by lightning.

The area around the island is prone to earthquakes due to the Jabuka–Andrija Fault. In 2003, the island was struck by a long series of earthquakes, the largest of which was M_{w} 5.5. Another series occurred in 2004–05 with a M_{L}5.2 quake. However, due to Jabuka's remoteness, these earthquakes are weakly felt on the Croatian mainland and inhabited islands.

== Flora and fauna ==
Its coast is steep and difficult to approach, and landings can be made only when the weather is clear. The easiest access is on the southwest side. On the island, noteworthy species such as a Dalmatian Wall Lizard and some plants (Centaurea jabukensis and Centaurea crithmifolia, both Asteraceae) are protected endemics. In 1958, the island was declared a geological monument of nature. The surrounding sea is rich with fish, especially sea bream. However, due to remoteness, lack of safe harbour, strong currents, and sudden changes of weather, fishermen have traditionally avoided the waters around Jabuka.

=== Birds ===
Jabuka, along with Vis, Sveti Andrija and its neighbouring islet of Kamnik, Brusnik, Biševo and the Palagruža archipelago, forms part of the Croatian Offshore Islands Important Bird Area (IBA). This was designated as such by BirdLife International because it supports significant breeding populations of Scopoli's and Yelkouan shearwaters, as well as of Eleonora's falcons.

== Bibliography ==
- Šerić, Neven (2006). Biserna ogrlica - pučinski otoci srednjeg Jadrana (RTF) (in Croatian). Marjan tisak. ISBN 953-214-367-X.
