= Svetac =

Island of Croatia

Coordinates: 43°01′33″N 15°44′56″E

Sveti Andrija
Native name: Štondrija Nickname: Svetac
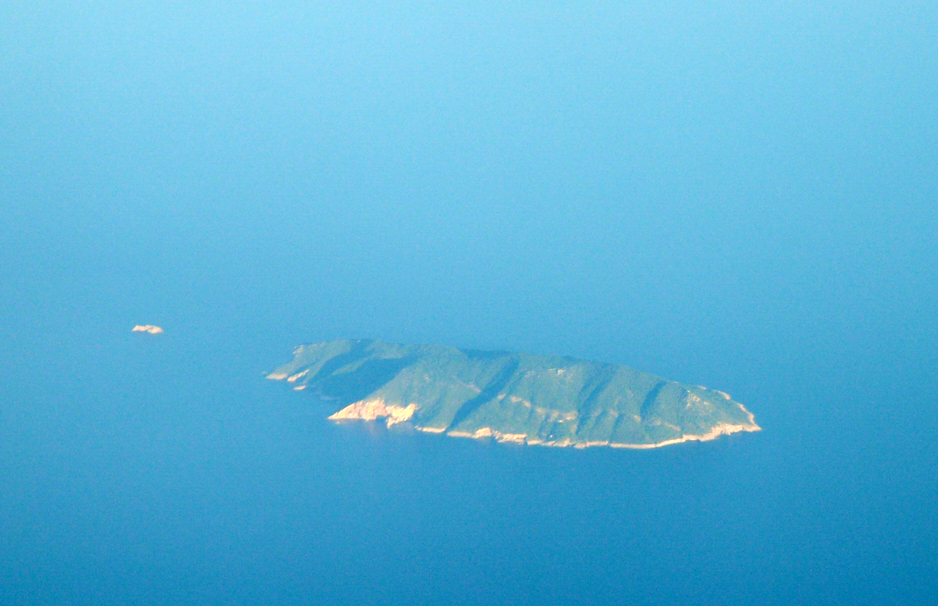

- Location within Croatia
- Interactive map of Sveti Andrija

Geography
- Location: Adriatic Sea
- Archipelago: Vis Islands
- Area: 4.19 km^{2} (1.62 sq mi)
- Highest elevation: 316 m (1037 ft)
- Highest point: Kosa

Administration
- Croatia
- County: Split-Dalmatia County

Sveti Andrija (Croatian pronunciation: [svȇtī ǎndrija], meaning "Saint Andrew"), often called Svetac (Croatian pronunciation: [sʋěːtat͡s], meaning "saint"), is an island in the Croatian part of the Adriatic Sea.

Svetac is situated 14 nautical miles (26 km) from Komiža (a town on the island of Vis). It is uninhabited, although it used to have permanent residents. Approximately 300 meters off the southwest coast of the island there is the islet of Kamnik, and further on the open sea there is the volcanic island called Jabuka. About 2.5 kilometres (1.3 nautical miles) to the southeast there is the small volcanic island of Brusnik.

== History ==
Svetac was inhabited in prehistoric era, as evidenced by archeological remains, the oldest of which were found in Tovorski bod, a cave in the south part of the island. A Benedictine monastery built on the island was abandoned in late 15th or early 16th century. In 1760, a small pine tar factory was opened by the Foretić family from Biševo, who brought about twenty resin collectors (pegajuoli) from Peschici on the Gargano Peninsula in Italy. After the pine forest on the island was completely cut down, the factory was closed, and Svetac was acquired by members of the Zanki (originally Zanchi) family, who settled there permanently. It is likely that the Zanki family descended from one of the resin collectors brought from Peschici. The population census on Svetac from 1951 was around 60, all members of the Zanki family. The last one of the group that lived there all year round was Antonija Zanki, an elderly woman who died in 2001. Now members of the Zanki family effectively live there four to six months a year, from late spring to autumn, still keeping up the houses of their grandfathers, fishing, making red wine and olive oil. Most members of the Zanki family who own this, largest private island in Adriatic, live in Komiža now (14 nm east). Svetac island is in open seas, without any natural protected bay.

== Environment ==
Svetac is a breeding ground for a small number of Eleonora's falcons, a rare bird with only c. 40–80 nesting pairs estimated to live on the outer Croatian Adriatic islands. The falcons migrate to Madagascar every September and return to their nests in April.

Svetac and its neighbouring islet of Kamnik, along with Vis, Brusnik, Biševo, Jabuka and the Palagruža archipelago, forms part of the Croatian Offshore Islands Important Bird Area (IBA). This was designated as such by BirdLife International because it supports significant breeding populations of Scopoli's and Yelkouan shearwaters, as well as of the Eleonora's falcons.

== See also ==
- Jabuka–Andrija Fault

== Bibliography ==
- Šerić, Neven (2006). Biserna ogrlica - pučinski otoci srednjeg Jadrana (RTF) (in Croatian). Marjan tisak. ISBN 953-214-367-X.
- Mithad Kozličić, Josip Faričić: "The Significance of Sv. Andrija Island (Svetac) on a Sailing Route Across the Adriatic Presented on Old Geographical Maps"
