= Vis (island) =

Croatian island off the Balkan Peninsula coast

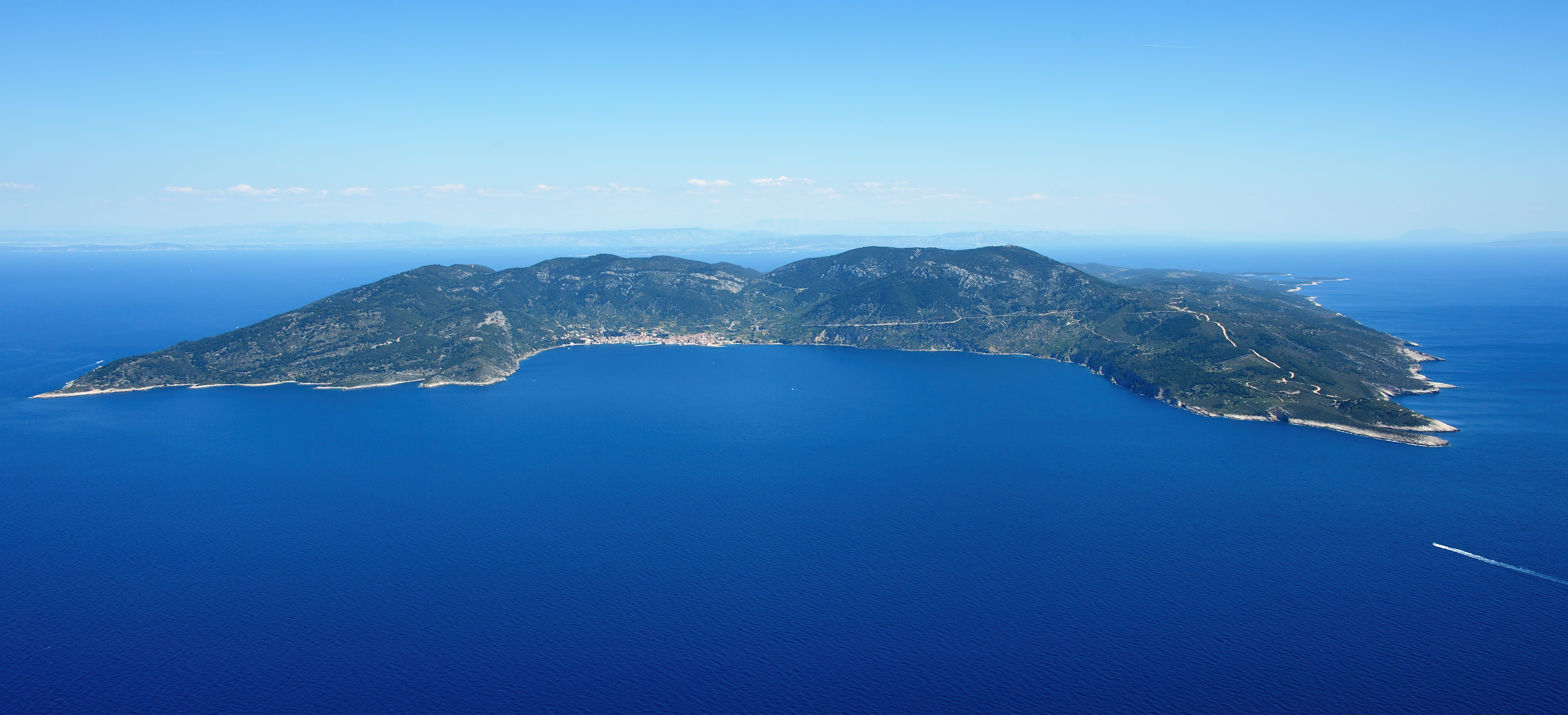
- Aerial image of Vis (view from the southwest)
- Interactive map of Vis

Geography
- Location: Adriatic Sea
- Coordinates: 43°02′33″N 16°09′09″E
- Area: 89.72 km^{2} (34.64 sq mi)
- Highest elevation: 587 m (1926 ft)
- Highest point: Hum

Administration
- Croatia
- County: Split-Dalmatia County
- Largest settlement: Vis (pop. 1,920)

Demographics
- Population: 3,313 (2021)
- Pop. density: 36.92/km^{2} (95.62/sq mi)

Vis (pronounced [ʋi:s]) is a Croatian island in the Adriatic Sea. Before the end of World War I, the island was held by the Liburnians, the Republic of Venice, the Napoleonic Kingdom of Italy, and the Austrian Empire. During the 19th century, the sea to the north of Vis was the site of two naval battles. In 1920, the island was ceded to the Kingdom of Yugoslavia as part of the Treaty of Rapallo. During World War II, the island was the headquarters of the Yugoslav Partisan movement. After the war, Vis was used as a naval base for the Yugoslav People's Army until 1989. The island's main industries are viticulture, fishing, fish processing, and tourism.

== Geography ==
The island is composed predominantly of limestone rocks through which precipitation rapidly infiltrates into the karst underground. There are no permanent surface streams, but groundwater is retained within a geological structure known as the Komiža salt diapir, making Vis one of the few Adriatic islands with its own freshwater reserves. This geological structure was formed by the uplift of Triassic evaporite rocks approximately 220 million years old. At the contact between permeable limestones and less permeable evaporites, natural barriers have formed, allowing the accumulation of significant quantities of underground freshwater. Because the amount of available water depends entirely on local precipitation, the groundwater resources of Vis are vulnerable to prolonged droughts, increased tourist consumption, and potential contamination of the karst aquifer.

Vis has an area of 90.26 square kilometres (34.85 square miles). Its highest point is Hum, which is 587 metres (1,926 feet) above sea level.

== Population ==
Historical population of Vis island
Year	Pop.	±%
1857	6,304	—
1869	6,485	+2.9%
1880	7,871	+21.4%
1890	8,647	+9.9%
1900	9,914	+14.7%
1910	10,107	+1.9%
1921	9,788	−3.2%
1931	8,756	−10.5%
1948	7,485	−14.5%
1953	7,890	+5.4%
1961	7,004	−11.2%
1971	5,049	−27.9%
1981	4,134	−18.1%
1991	4,361	+5.5%
2001	3,637	−16.6%
2011	3,460	−4.9%
2021	3,313	−4.2%
Source: Naselja i stanovništvo Republike Hrvatske 1857–2001, DZS, Zagreb, 2005

The farthest inhabited island off the Croatian mainland, Vis had a population of 3,313 in 2021. The island's two largest settlements are the town of Vis on the eastern side (the settlement for which the island was originally named) and Komiža on its western coast.

== Environment ==
Vis, along with Brusnik, Sveti Andrija and the neighbouring islet of Kamnik, Biševo, Jabuka and the Palagruža archipelago, forms part of the Croatian Offshore Islands Important Bird Area (IBA). This was designated as such by BirdLife International because it supports significant breeding populations of Scopoli's and Yelkouan shearwaters, as well as of Eleonora's falcons.

== History ==
=== Ancient history ===
Vis was inhabited by the time of the Neolithic period. It was settled by Illyrians, who were under the domination of Liburni from the 8th to the 6th centuries B.C. In the 4th century BC, the Greek tyrant of Syracuse, Dionysius the Elder, founded the colony of Issa (Ancient Greek: Ἴσσα) on the island. The establishment of the colony was part of a plan to control the Adriatic.

During the 3rd century Issa founded the emporia Tragurion (Traù, now Trogir) and Epetion (Stobreč) on the Illyrian mainland. Its predominance in the region lasted until the first Illyro-Roman war 229-219 B.C. when it became a pawn in the battles of greater powers. In the civil war it sided with Pompey and consequently lost its privileges and autonomy in 47 BC when it was reduced to the rank of an oppidum civium Romanorum and was dependent on the newly founded colony at Salona. As a polis, Issa minted its own money, and these coins of many types had wide circulation. The town, situated on a slope on the W side of a large bay, was defended by strong Hellenistic walls, still visible in an irregular quadrangle (265 m × 360 m (869 ft × 1,181 ft)) that enclosed an area of 9.8 ha (24 acres). The street grid and foundations of houses have been found.

The necropolis has yielded many pieces of pottery, including some from South Italy. The wall of the cavea of the theater, built in the Roman period, is incorporated into the present Franciscan Monastery. It could seat about 3000 persons. Inscriptions, statues, coins, and pottery are preserved in the archaeological museums at Split and Zagreb. Later, it became an independent polis, and even minted its own money and founded its own colonies, the most notable of which was Aspálathos (the modern-day city of Split).

In the 1st century BC, the island was held by the Liburnians.

=== Under Venice ===
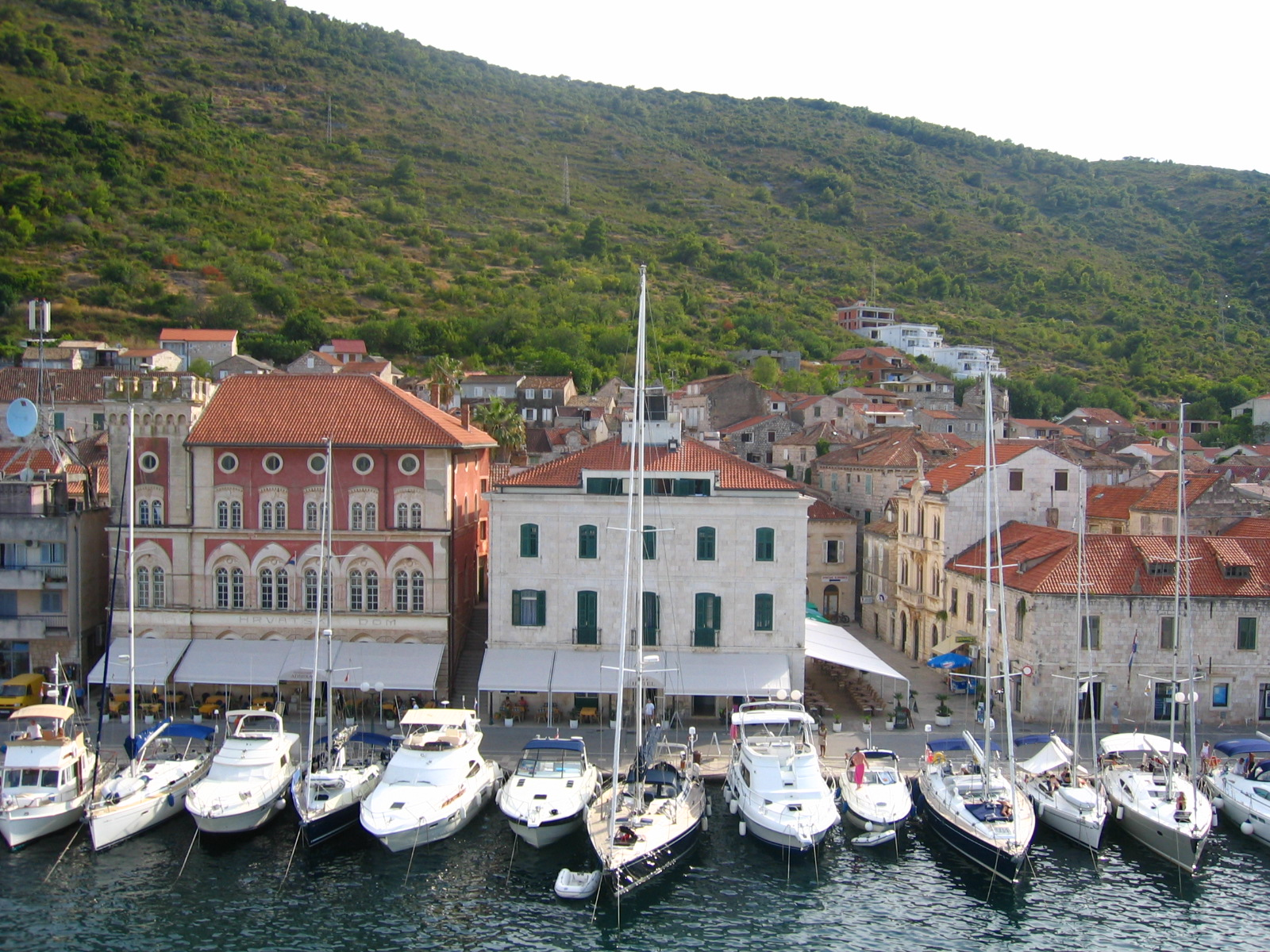
Harbour of Vis

Until 1797, the island was under the rule of the Republic of Venice. During this time large settlements developed along the coastline (Comisa (now Komiža) and Lissa (now Vis)). Administratively, the island of Lissa was for centuries bound to the island of Lesina, now named Hvar. The Venetian influence is still recognizable in architecture found on the island. The dialect of Croatian spoken on the island – called Cokavian – is recognized by the Croatian government as intangible cultural heritage and is notable for a large vocabulary of Venetian origin.

The Republic of Venice was dissolved by the forces of the French First Republic and most of it, including Dalmatia and Lissa, passed to the Habsburg Monarchy by the Treaty of Campo Formio in 1797, becoming part of the Venetian Province.

=== Long 19th century ===
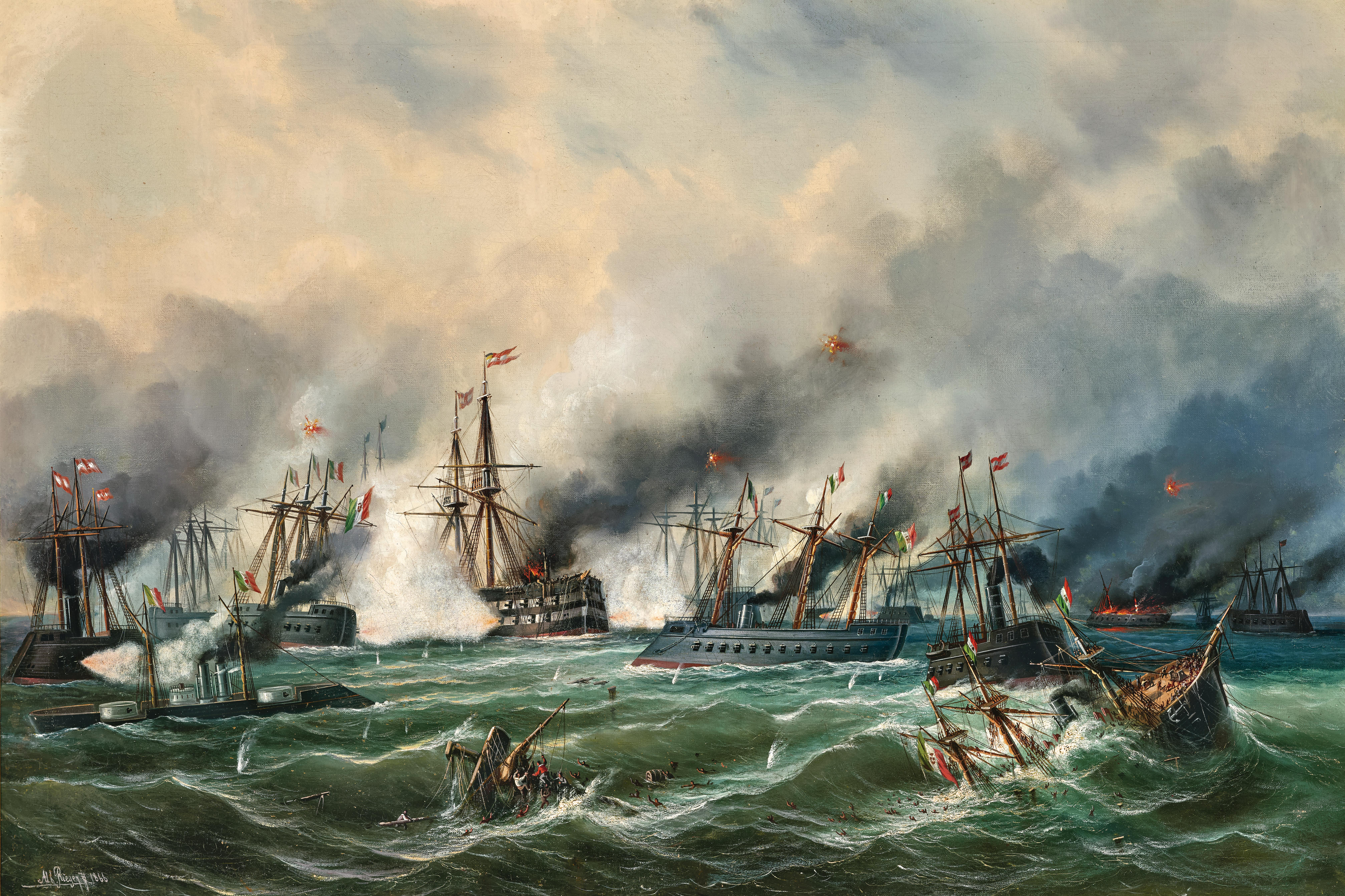
Battle of Vis, 1866

In 1805 (Peace of Pressburg) the short period of Austrian rule ended and the island passed to the Napoleonic Kingdom of Italy, with Italian as the official language. It then passed in 1809 directly under the rule of the First French Empire as part of the Illyrian Provinces. On 13 March 1811 however, a small Royal Navy squadron under the command of Captain William Hoste, defeated a larger French squadron in the Battle of Lissa (1811). As a result the British secured the island which became a naval base to control the Adriatic Sea. Fortifications were built across the island including the largest, Fort George which was built on a high promontory just above Vis town and the harbour.

From 1814 (de jure from 1815), with the defeat of Napoleon, the island was once-again ruled by the Austrian Empire as part of the Kingdom of Dalmatia crown land.

During this time another battle took place north of the island; on 20 July 1866, a smaller Austrian fleet, under Admiral Wilhelm von Tegetthoff, attacked the Italian fleet, under Admiral Carlo Pellion di Persano. The larger Italian force was defeated with the sinking of the Re d'Italia in the Battle of Lissa (1866).

In official Austrian (Habsburg) administration, as with other places in Dalmatia up until 1909, it maintained its Italian name of Lissa, In the Austrian census of 1910, out of 10,107 inhabitants (10,041 citizens), 9,939 responded that their language was Croatian (98.9%), with just 92 declared to be Italian-speakers (0.9%). After the end of World War I, it was under Italian occupation in the period from 1918 to 1921, before it was ceded to Kingdom of Yugoslavia as part of the 1920 Treaty of Rapallo.

=== Second World War ===
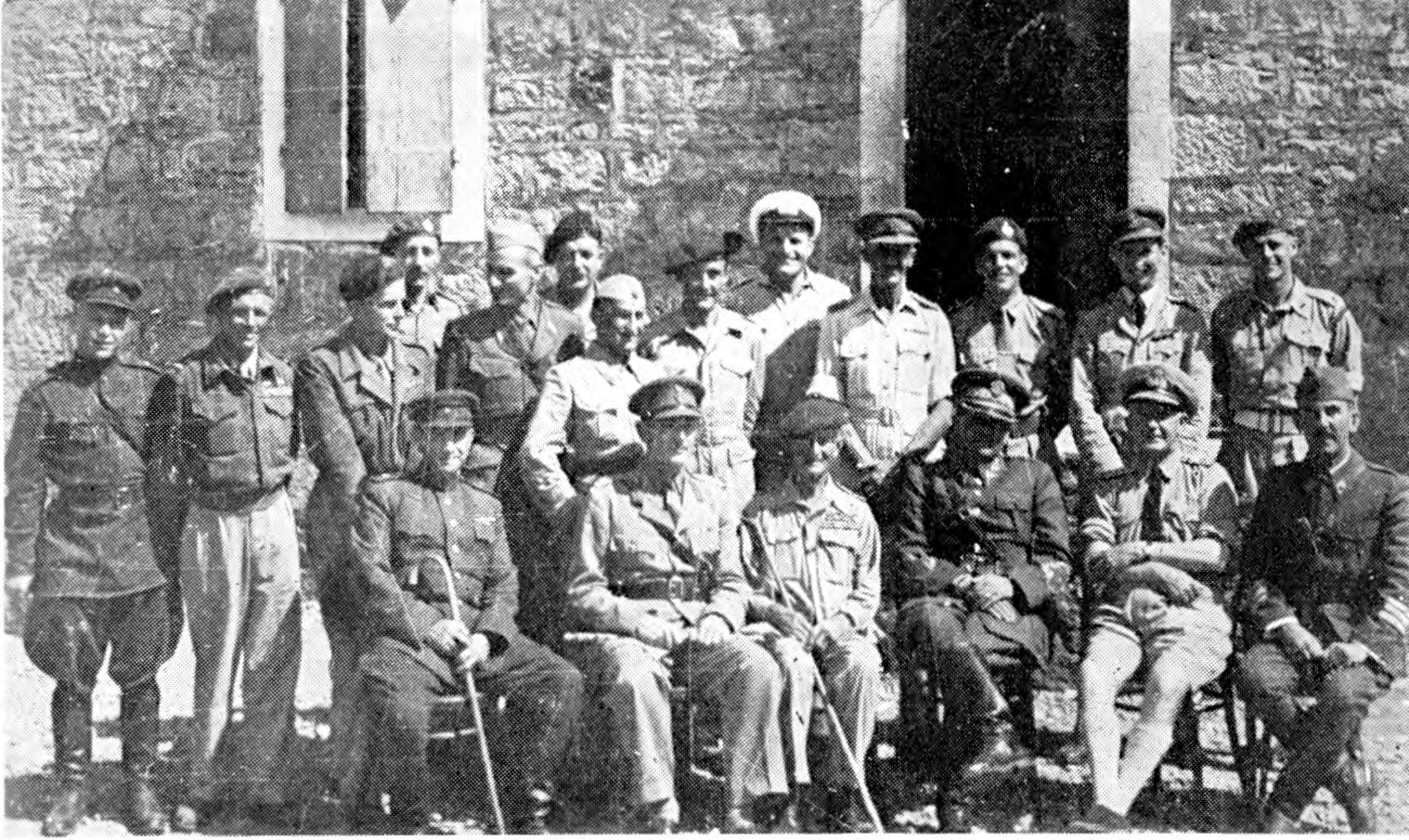
Josip Broz Tito with Yugoslav and Allied officers, 1944.

Vis was at one point the site of the general headquarters of Marshal Josip Broz Tito, the leader of the Yugoslav Partisan resistance movement. It was occupied by Italy between 1941 and 1943, then was liberated by the Partisans and reinforced by the British 2nd Commando Brigade. At the end of World War II the island returned to Yugoslavia. During the war the island was mined. Allied fighter planes were based at a small airfield that was also used for emergency landings of Allied bombers, including an American B-24 flown by George McGovern. No. 6 Squadron RAF extensively used the airfield as a forward operating base, flying Hawker Hurricane Mk IV fighter aircraft, from May 1944 to February 1945.

During World War II, a crate of the Armed Services Editions of paperback books was dropped by parachute along with other supplies on to Vis Island off the coast of Yugoslavia. The books were then read aloud to the partisans by English speaking soldiers who translated the books as they read them.

Early in July 1944, the novelist Evelyn Waugh flew with Randolph Churchill from Bari, Italy, to Vis as part of the British military mission to Yugoslavia. There they met Marshal Tito. Waugh and Churchill returned to Bari before flying back to Yugoslavia to begin their mission, but their aeroplane crash-landed, both men were injured, and their mission was delayed for a month.

During WWII the island was also home to 1435 Squadron of the RAF flying Mark IX Spitfires in ground support of allied troops fighting in Italy.

=== After 1945 ===
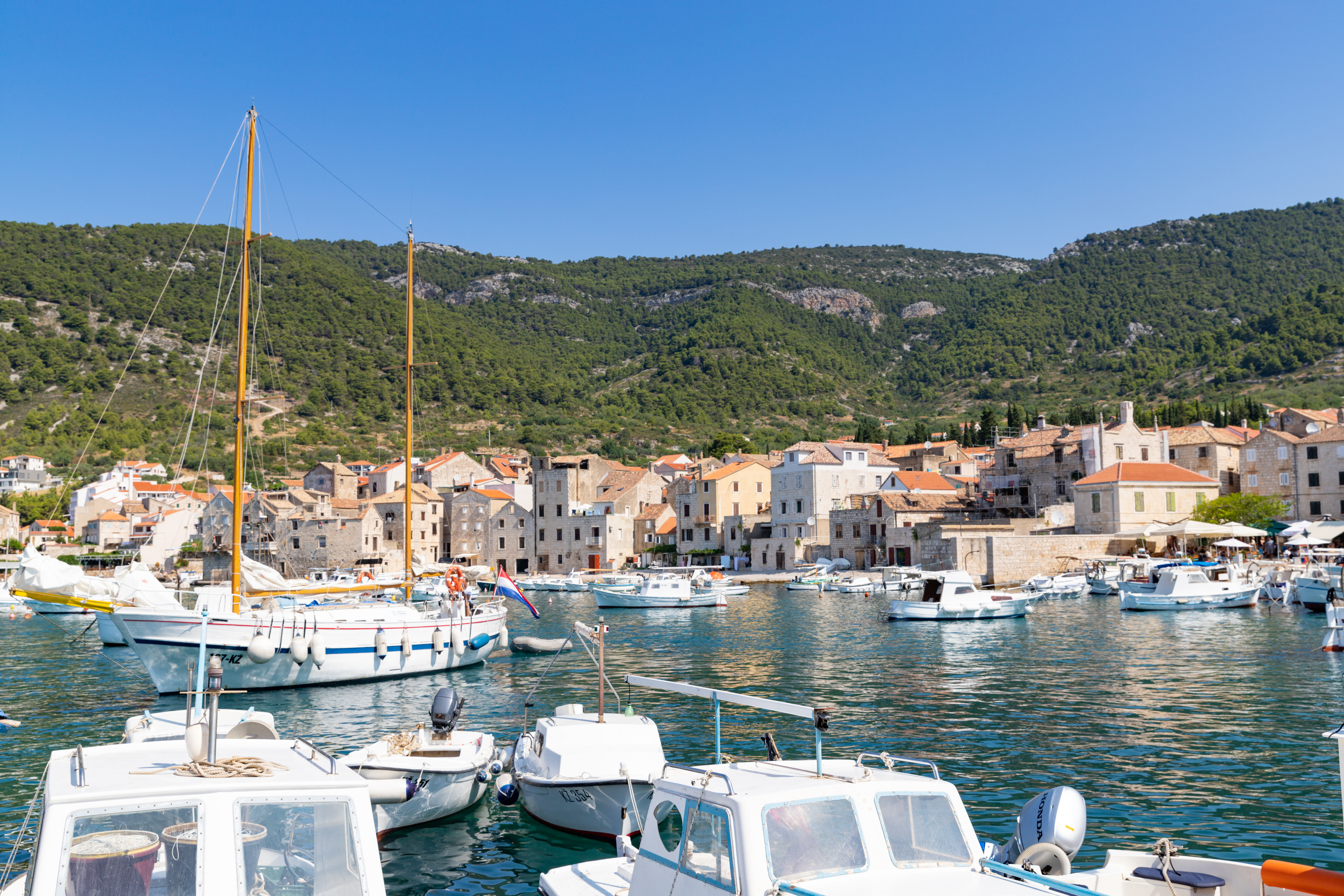
Town of Komiža

After the war, the Yugoslav People's Army used the island as one of its main naval bases until abandoning the base in 1989. After Croatia became independent in 1991, its navy did not reclaim most of the facilities, and the many abandoned buildings are being used for civilian purposes and tourism, including tunnels, bunkers and a secret submarine base. In 2008, 34 mines left over from World War II were cleared from the island.

During Yugoslavia Island of Vis primarily was used as military base and it was closed for public. After the war of independence in 1991-1995, Croatia slowly gained economic development due to its tourism, and therefore popularity of Croatian islands was in uprising. Vis is a home to numerous bay beaches including Stiniva, Srebrna, Stončica and Zaglava. Vis is locally known as “island of fishermans and winemakers". Due to its geographical location and untouched nature, island is most suitable for wine and fish and in 2019, GEOPARK Vis archipelago became a member of UNESCO Global Geoparks.

In 2017, the sequel of musical comedy Mamma Mia! – movie Mamma Mia! Here We Go Again was filmed on location on Vis. The island represented fictional Greek island of Kalokairi, and the movie garnered more popularity for the island.

== Administration ==
Vis and Komiža are seats of separate administrative municipalities which cover the entire island and nearby islets, which are both part of Split-Dalmatia County.

== Economy ==
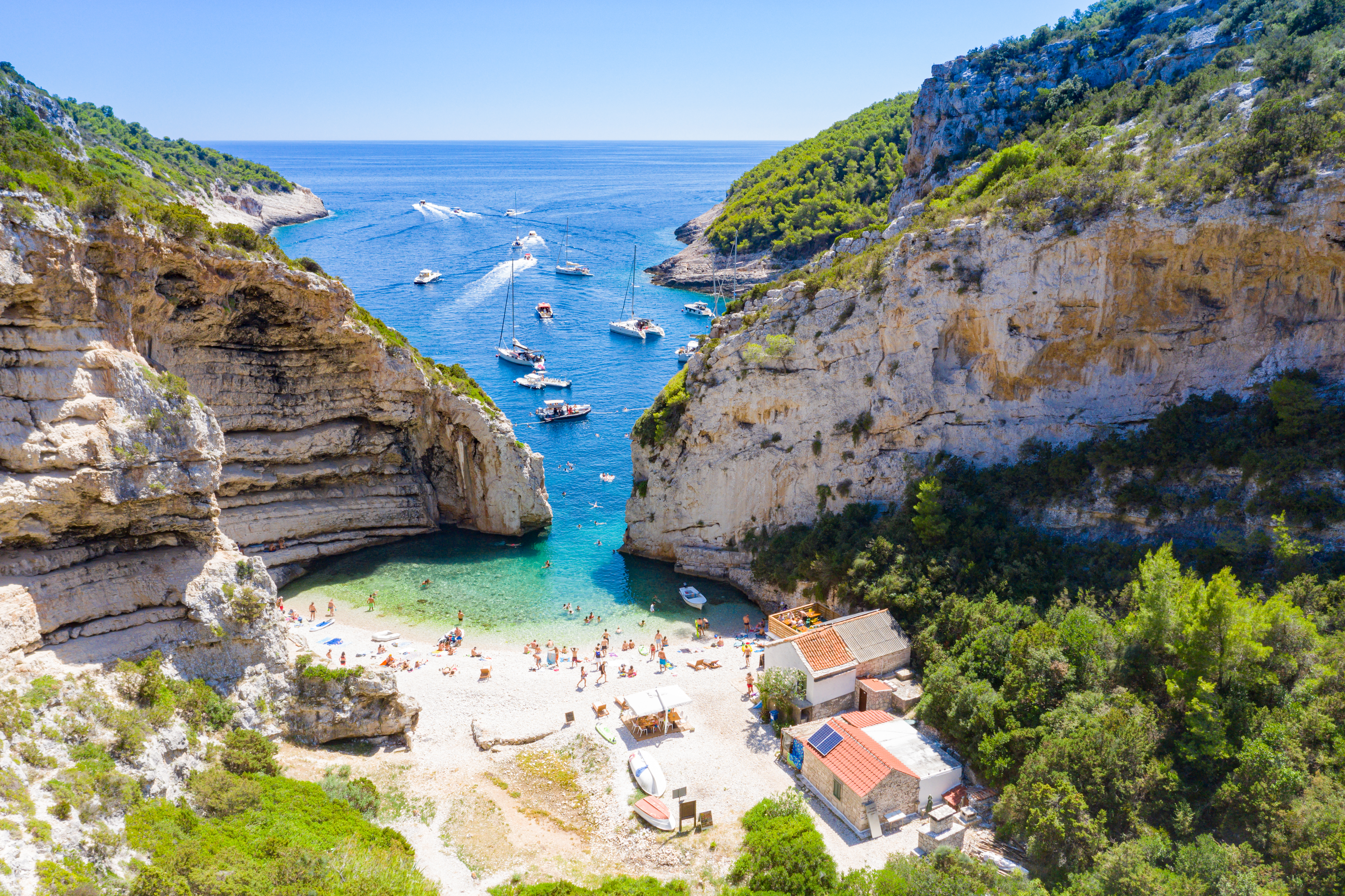
Stiniva bay beach

The island's main industries are agriculture (mainly viticulture), fishing, fish processing, and tourism.

Around 20% of the island's arable land is covered with vineyards. Autochthonous vine species cultivated on the island are Plavac Mali, Kurteloška, and Vugava. Vugava is autochthonous variety of wine of island Vis.

The sea around Vis is rich with fish, especially blue fish (sardine, mackerel and anchovy). Komiža fishermen of the 16th century developed their own type of fishing boat, the falkuša, which was used until the second half of the 20th century because of its excellent features.

== Access ==
Vis is accessed only by boat from Split. Jadrolinija services the island using mainly the ro-ro ferry MT Petar Hektorović, with a scheduled voyage time of 2 hours and 20 minutes. There is also a high-speed passenger catamaran service Split–Milna–Hvar–Vis provided by Jadrolinija which takes 1 hour and 30 minutes. During the summer season (from 31 May – 29 September), the ferry and high-speed catamaran prices are higher.

There used to be direct ship lines to Italy during summer season. In 2010 Termoli Jet started Termoli-Vis-Split line, taking 3h30' to reach Vis from Italian city of Termoli. In 2015, Blue Line ran the now cancelled night ferry service Ancona-Vis.

In 2016, now-defunct European Coastal Airlines tried establishing seaplane passenger service Split-Vis, which took some 15 minutes.

== Gallery ==
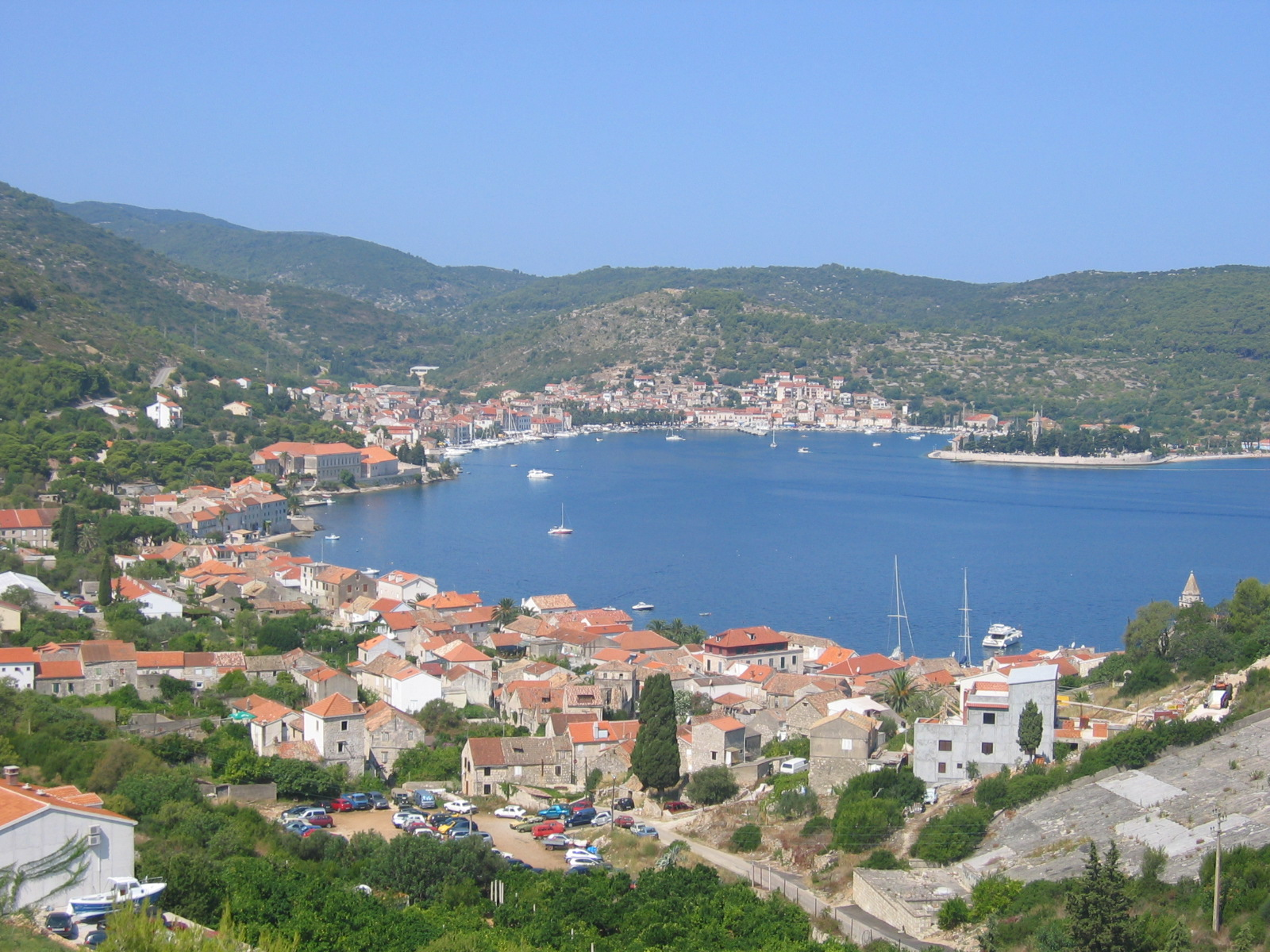
Town and bay of Vis

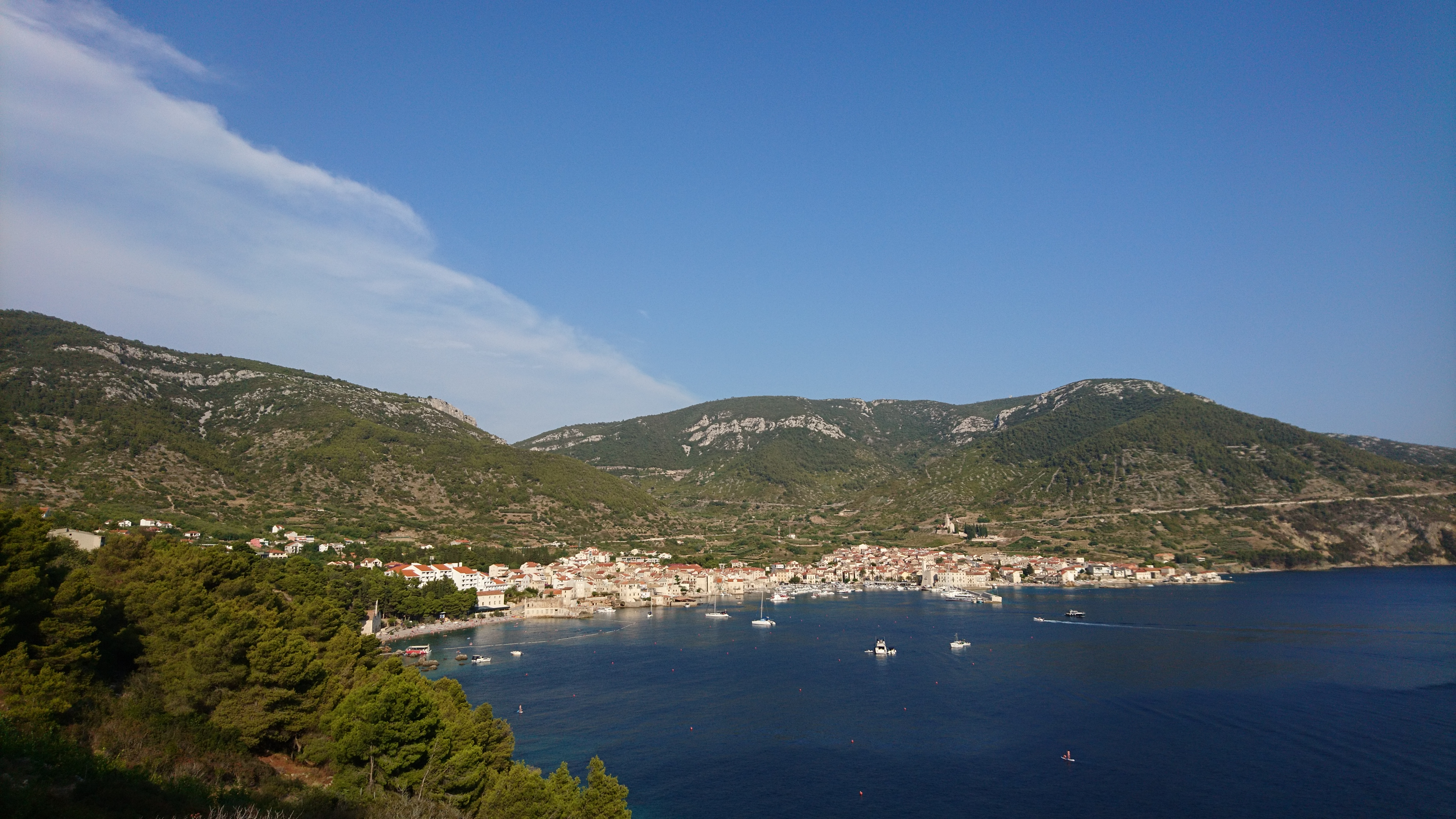
Komiža town

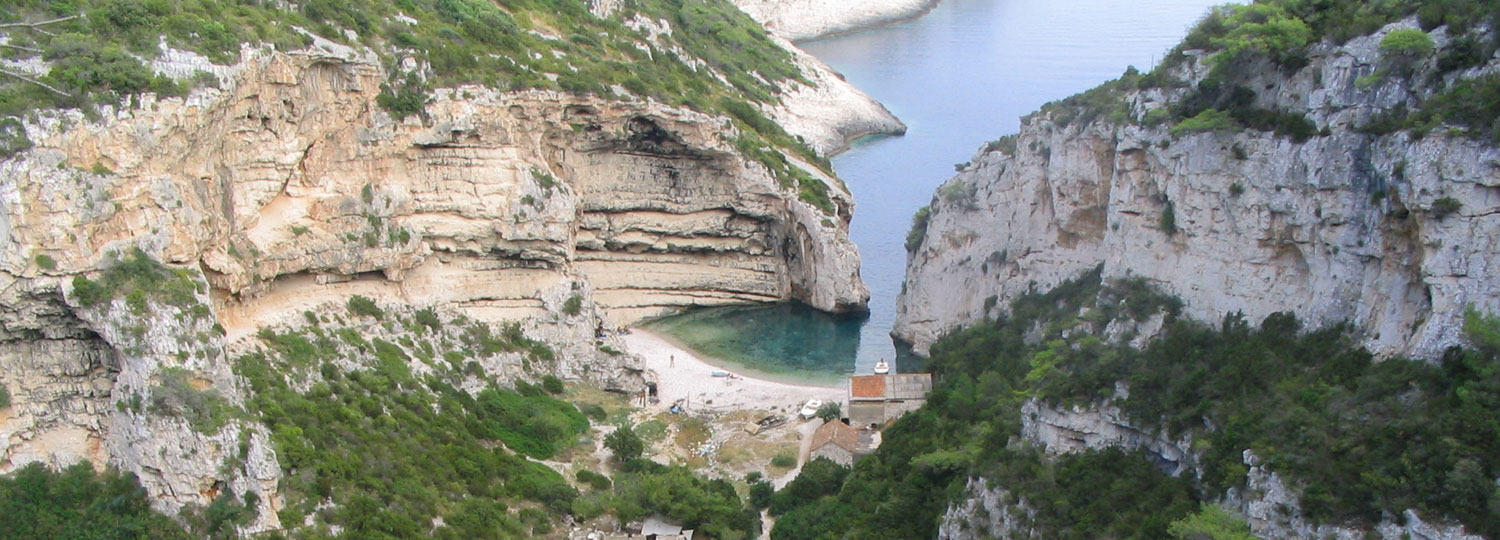
Stiniva Bay

Map of Vis

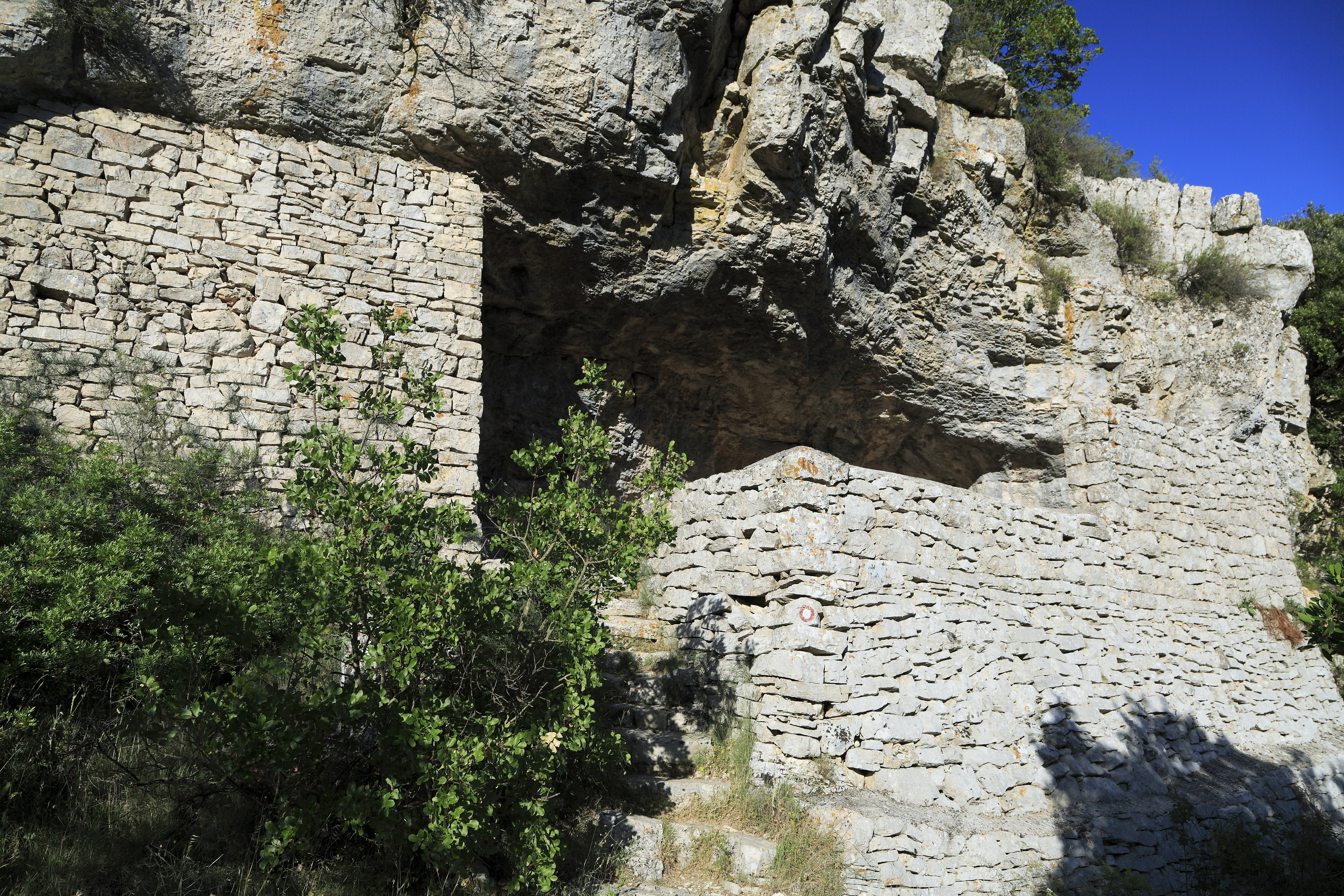
Tito's cave

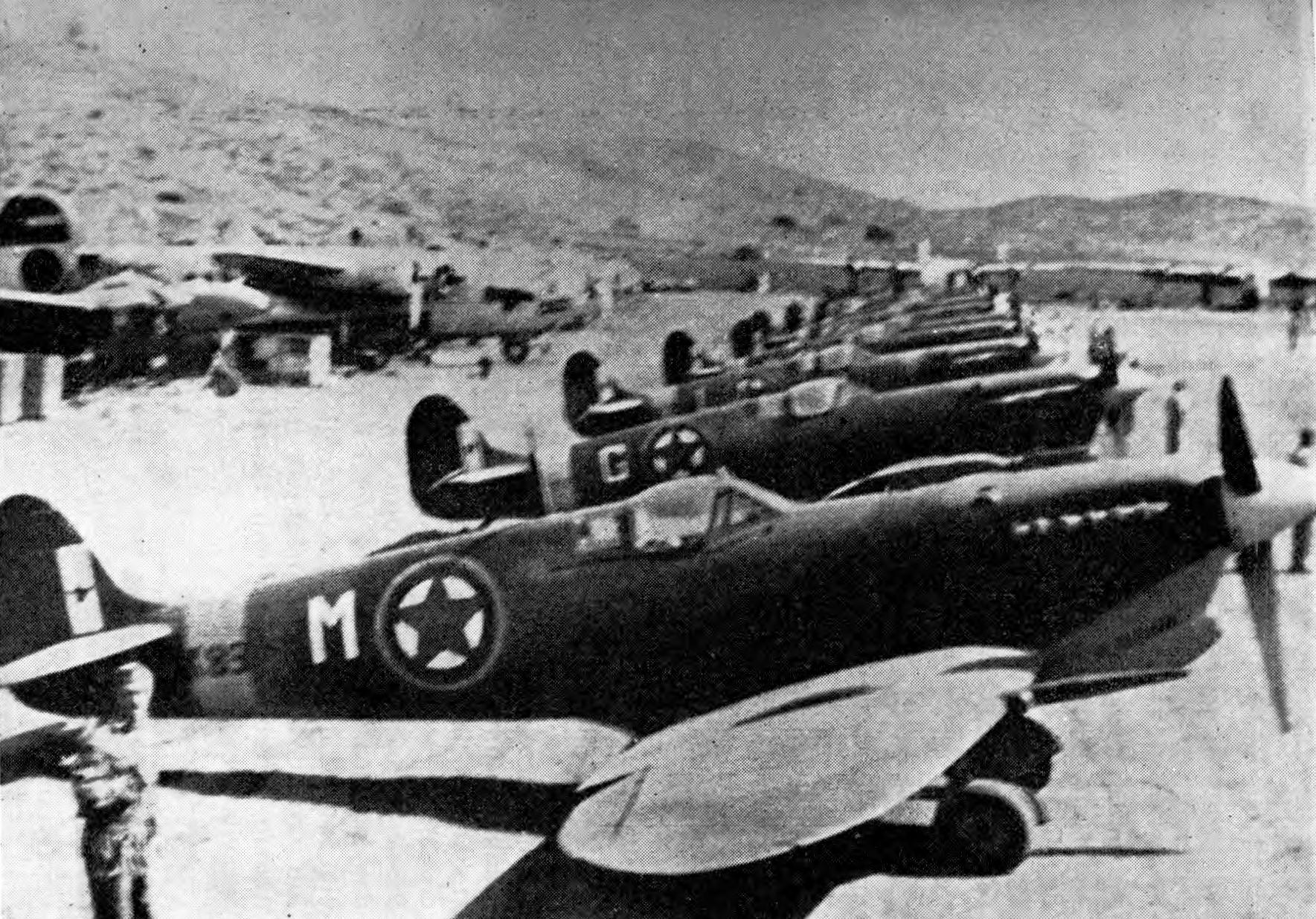
Partisan planes on Vis airfield, World War 2

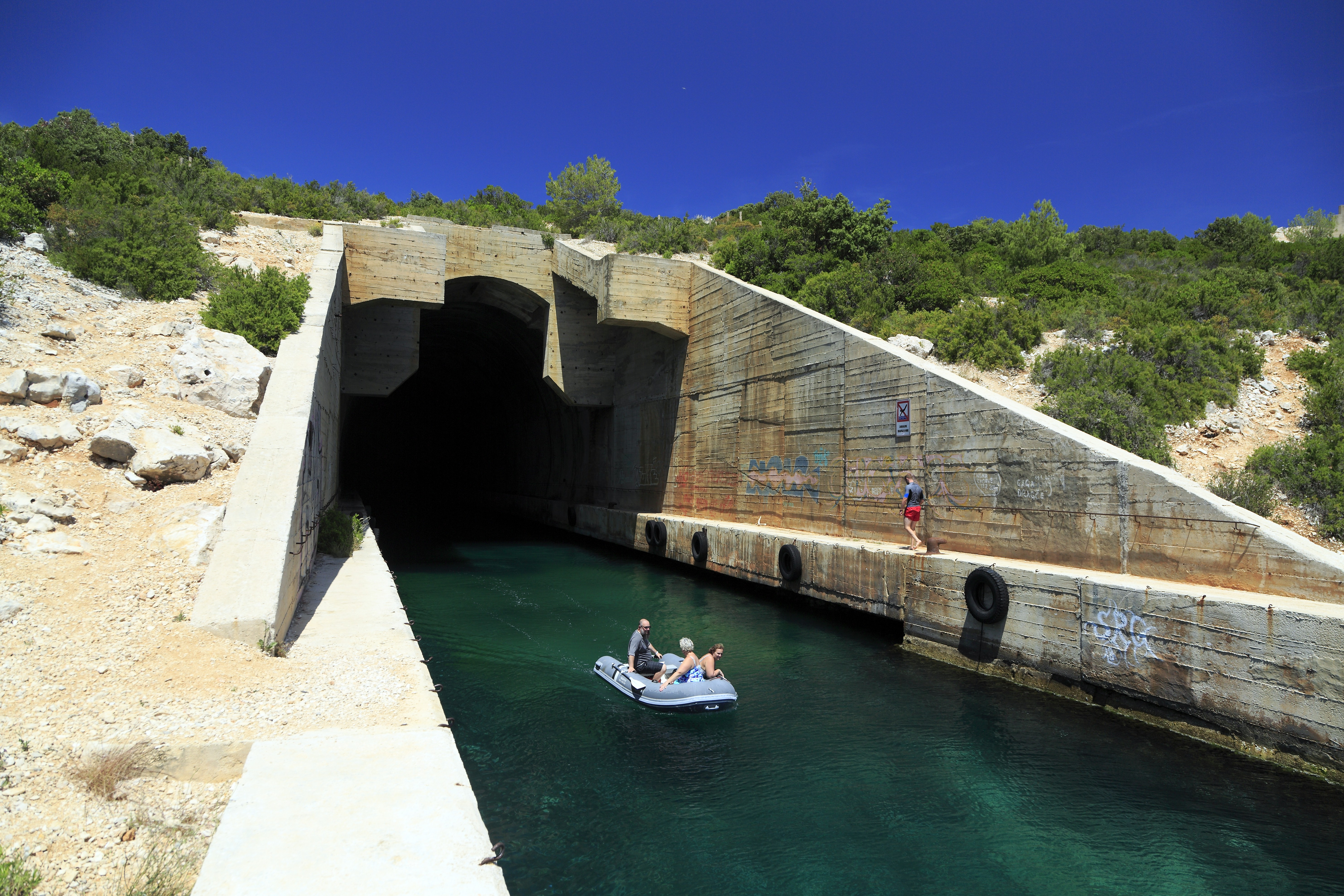
Submarine bunker, military installation left from Yugoslav army times

== Notable people ==
- Željko Rodić
