= Komiža =

Town in Split-Dalmatia, Croatia

- Town
- Grad Komiža; Town of Komiža
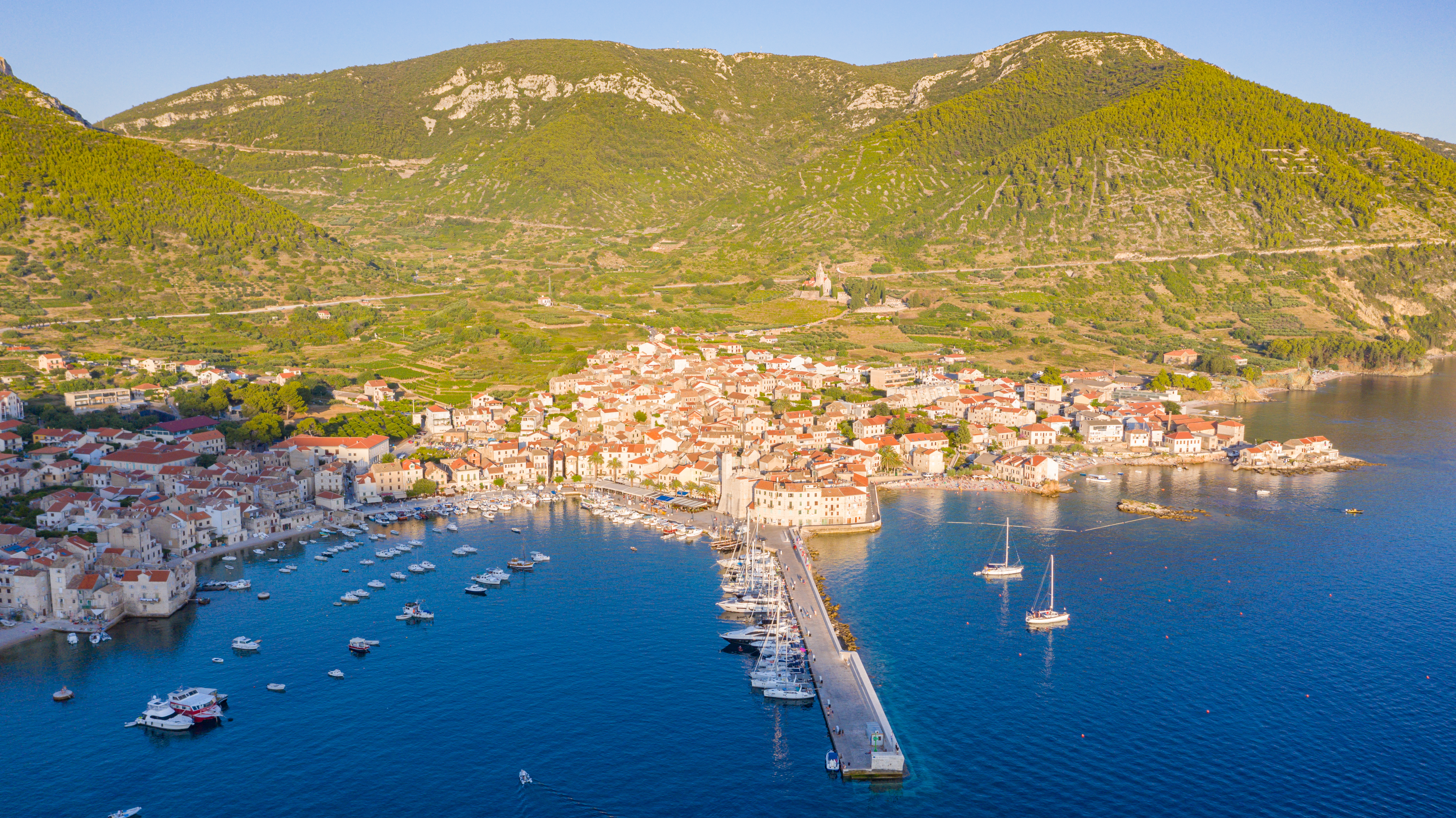
- View of Komiža

- Location of Komiža in Croatia Komiža (Croatia)
- Coordinates: 43°03′N 16°06′E
- Country: Croatia
- Region: Dalmatia
- County: Split-Dalmatia County
- Island: Vis

Government
  - Mayor: Tonka Ivčević (SDP)

Area
  - Town: 48.3 km^{2} (18.6 sq mi)
  - Urban: 19.6 km^{2} (7.6 sq mi)

Population (2021)
  - Town: 1,394
  - Density: 28.9/km^{2} (74.8/sq mi)
  - Urban: 1,261
  - Urban density: 64.3/km^{2} (167/sq mi)
- Time zone: UTC+1 (CET)
  - Summer (DST): UTC+2 (CEST)
- Website: komiza.hr

Komiža (pronounced [kɔ̌miʒa]) is a Croatian coastal town lying on the western coast of the island of Vis in the central part of the Adriatic Sea.

Komiža is located at the foot of the Hum hill (587 m). The town has a Mediterranean climate. The economy is based on farming, winemaking, fishing and fish processing, seafaring, and, in recent times, tourism. The fishermen are noted for their Falkuša vessels.

Komiža has two roads that connect it with the town of Vis, the only town being connected with Split by ferry line — they are the D117 state road and a county road.

== General information ==
Situated in a deep bay, whose eastern shore abounds with large pebble beaches (Kamenica, Gusarica, Nova Pošta, Velo Žalo), Komiža offers excellent visitor opportunities: quality accommodations (hotels and apartments), and a number of cultural and historic sites, monasteries and fortresses. It is known for its fishermen.

Sports and recreational facilities include three boccia courts, as well as various playgrounds for basketball, handball and football. Water sports and diving are part of the towns summer activities. Additionally, Komiža is well known for its wines.

== Geography ==
Komiža is located on the island of Vis, which is the most distant large island in the Central Dalmatian coast. Vis is centered on 90.3 square kilometers of land. Its widest point spans 17 kilometers and from north to south its maximum length is 8 kilometers. It is approximately 45-55 kilometers from the Dalmatian coastline to the island of Vis. The coastline of Vis measures 76.7 kilometers long and is marked by bays, coves and natural ports.

== Climate ==
Komiža experiences warm and temperate winters with warm to hot summers with the landward breeze making it the most moderate climate in the Republic of Croatia. The climate allows for Tropical and Mediterranean vegetation, including palms, carobs, olives, grapes and lemons. The average rainfall is about 750 mm (29.53 in). The island of Vis has a number of natural sources of drinking water from the natural spring water reservoirs. The island is also home to twelve distinct types of island vegetation. Vis has been marked as one of the ten most environmentally preserved islands in the Mediterranean by the World Organization for Environmental Protection.

Since records began in 1981, the highest temperature recorded at the local weather station at an elevation of 20 metres (66 ft) was 38.8 °C (101.8 °F), on 24 July 2007. The coldest temperature was −4.5 °C (23.9 °F), on 1 January 2017.

== Population ==
Historical population of Komiža
Year	Pop.	±%
1880	3,554	—
1890	3,852	+8.4%
1900	4,657	+20.9%
1910	4,948	+6.2%
1921	4,948	+0.0%
1931	4,570	−7.6%
1948	3,767	−17.6%
1953	3,892	+3.3%
1961	3,443	−11.5%
1971	2,421	−29.7%
1981	1,917	−20.8%
1991	2,255	+17.6%
2001	1,677	−25.6%
2011	1,526	−9.0%
2021	1,394	−8.7%
Source: Naselja i stanovništvo Republike Hrvatske 1857–2001, DZS, Zagreb, 2005

In the 2021 census, the municipality had a total of 1,394 residents, in the following settlements:

- Biševo, population 23
- Borovik, population 7
- Duboka, population 10
- Komiža, population 1,261
- Oključna, no population
- Palagruža, no population
- Podhumlje, population 44
- Podšpilje, population 10
- Sveti Andrija, population 2
- Žena Glava, population 37
Town of Komiža: Population trends 1857–2021
v

population	2703	2945	3554	3852	4657	4948	4948	4570	3767	3892	3443	2421	1917	2255	1677	1526	1394
	1857	1869	1880	1890	1900	1910	1921	1931	1948	1953	1961	1971	1981	1991	2001	2011	2021

Sources: Croatian Bureau of Statistics publications

== Landmarks ==
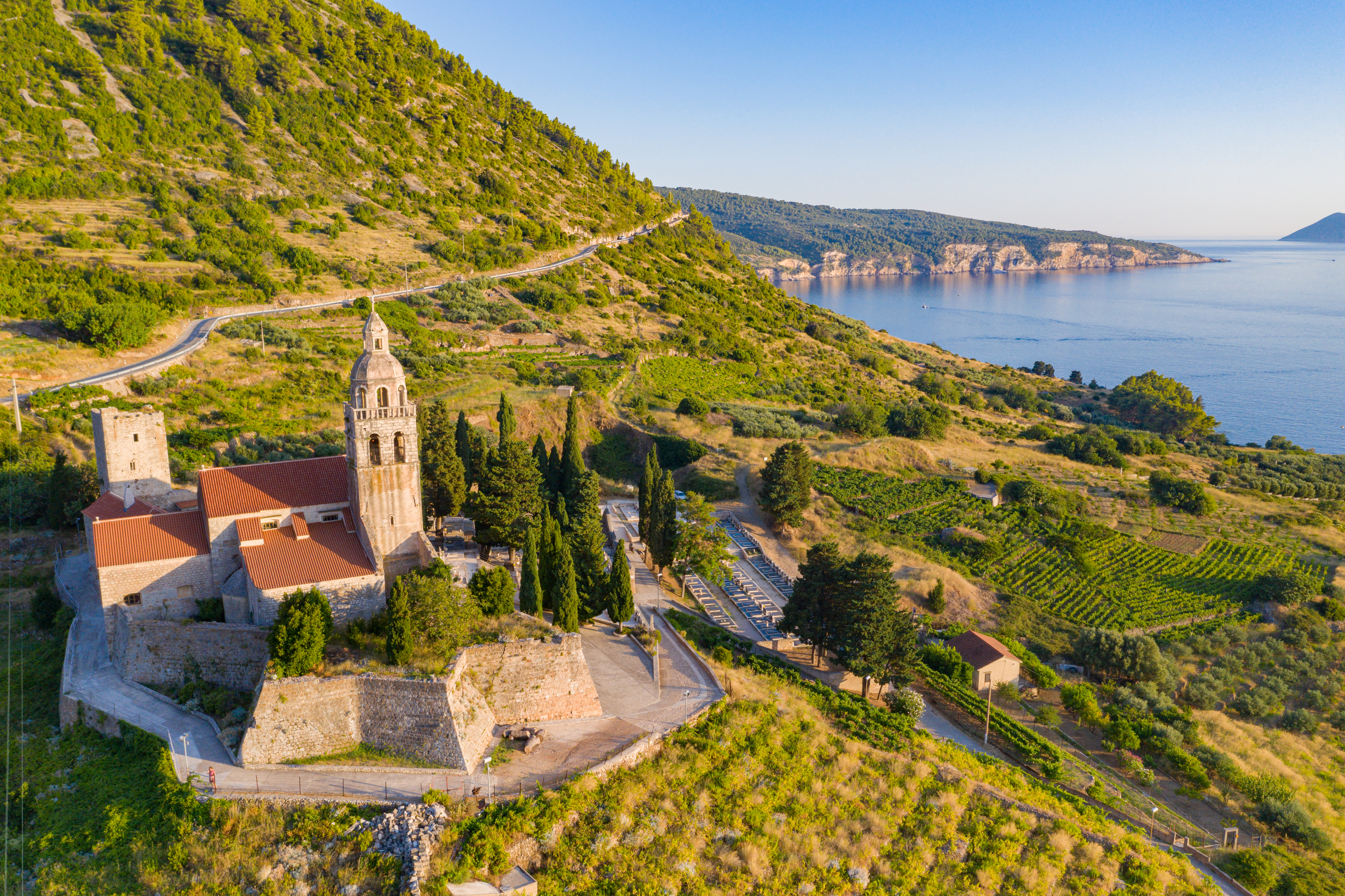
Church of Saint Nicholas

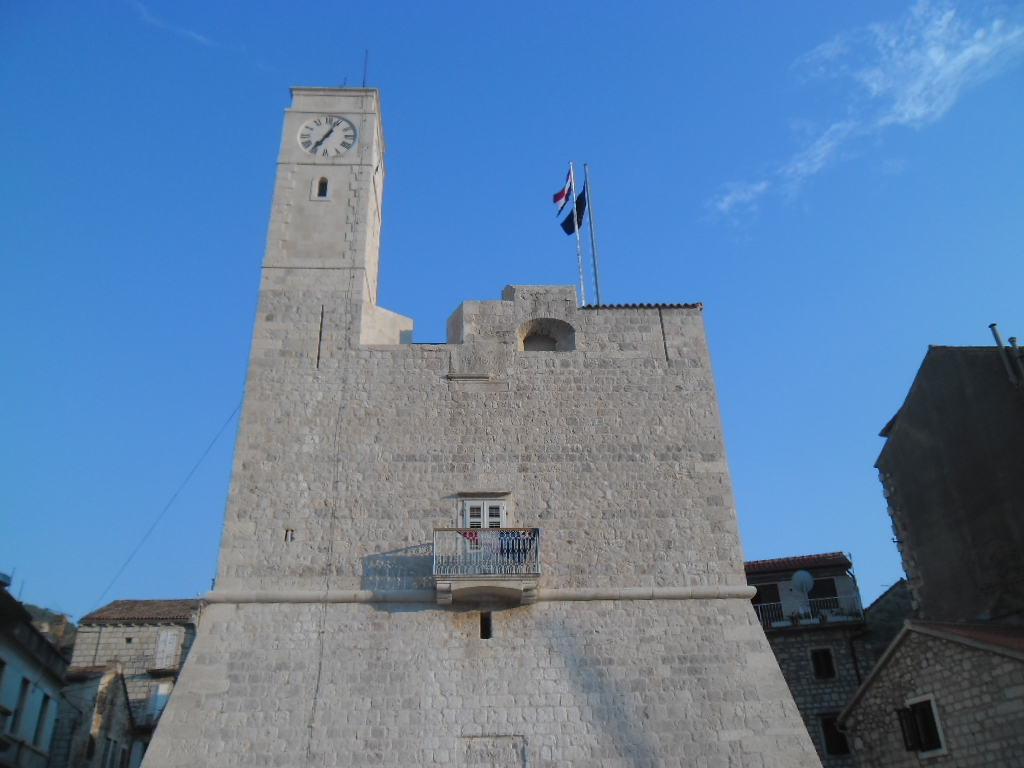
Fort of Komiža

The settlement of Komiža was first mentioned in the 12th century. In the 13th century, the Benedictines established the St. Nicholas Monastery on elevated ground above the settlement. The oldest part of the monastery is a single-naved Romanesque church with a semi-circular apse dating from the 13th century.

In the period between the 14th and 17th century a large five-naved church was built; its central nave dates back to the beginning of the 16th century and the large Baroque sanctuary to 1652. Two high square towers in Romanesque style are what is left from the original monastery fortifications; the tower above the church facade was converted into a bell tower in 1770. The citadel in the port was built in 1585.

The church of Our Lady of Pirates consists of three single-naved churches connected via internal arches. The oldest of the three is the middle church (16th century), while the side churches were built in the 17th and the 18th centuries. The church features Baroque altars, an organ from 1670 and a 17th-century silver relief of Our Lady of the Rosary.

The fortified church of St. Roch (Rocco) was erected in 1763, and the church of Our Lady of the Seven Sorrows (the New Church) dates back to 1756.

The Art Nouveau building of the Community Centre from the beginning of the 20th century is a work by the architect A. Bezic; the Memorial Centre was designed by S. Planic, and the author of the reliefs and mosaics is B. Mardesic. The Gallery of Duro Tiljak has been open in Komiža since 1966, and since 1984 also the Gallery of Boris Mardesic.

Komiža is well known for its close proximity to the island of Biševo, which is visited by 10,000 tourists each year who come to see the unique Blue Grotto. Biševo, in the early 1900s with a population of about 200 residents, was noted for bee-keeping and wild honey production. Popular sights also include the St. Nicholas' Convent monastery from the 13th century, the Kastel (Venetian Tower) in the harbor from the 16th century and the Baroque sanctuary from the 16th century.

There is also the annual celebration of Komiža's fishing heritage, Ribarska Noć (Fisherman's Night). The festival features fireworks, many types of traditional food, souvenir shops, ice cream stands, and a children's kayak race.

== Winemaking ==
Today winemaking is done mostly for personal consumption. The money generated by winemaking is not enough for a commercial industry. The grape harvest is performed in mid-September, with the grapes being field crushed and then fermented for 3–10 days. This is then pressed once and barrel aged for about 2–4 months. The pressed mash is reconstituted with water and allowed to ferment for a few more days and is pressed again, with this pressing being distilled and used to make the famous "grappa". Generally the vines are sprayed once with insecticide and then blue stoned (copper sulfate) about four times during the growing season.

The distillation of rosemary oil results in the production of up to 24,000 pounds oil per year.

== Fishing tradition ==
In the early 20th century many Komižini fishermen emigrated to America and settled in Washington state. They were among the first to introduce modern fishing methods and helped pioneer the North Pacific salmon fishing industry. In the earliest days of the 20th century these intrepid men fished the fertile waters of Puget Sound. By 1920 they were voyaging from their home ports of Everett, Seattle, Bellingham, Gig Harbor and Anacortes, on wooden vessels typically of no more than 60'. Equipped with only a compass and often highly inaccurate charts to navigate by, they traveled to the abundant Alaskan salmon fishing grounds of Prince William Sound, Southeast Alaska and False Pass, on the edge of the Bering Sea. This perilous journey covered thousand miles, often taking weeks, and from which countless men did not return. Descendants of these men still fish the same waters and take the same perilous journeys today.

Komiižni fishermen also emigrated to California's San Pedro / Long Beach area and Monterey California's Cannery Row (immortalized in Steinbeck's novel of the same name) and were highly successful in the then thriving California sardine fisheries of the first half of the 20th century.

Plaquemines Parish, Louisiana is home to another group descended from Komižini fishermen who left Dalmatia over a century ago. As a result of this influence it is still local custom to serve at least one meal every day that includes seafood. Traditionally these fishermen used the falkuša, a unique wooden sailboat that is tapered narrowly on both ends.

== Notable residents ==
- Ranko Marinković (1913–2001), an acclaimed Croatian novelist and dramatist born in Komiža. The public library in Komiža bears his name, and the most prominent literary prize in Croatia was named after his famous novel (Cyclops - Nagrada Kiklop).

== See also ==
- Croatia
- Vis (island)
- Biševo
- Dalmatia
