= Nußdorf am Attersee =

- Municipality
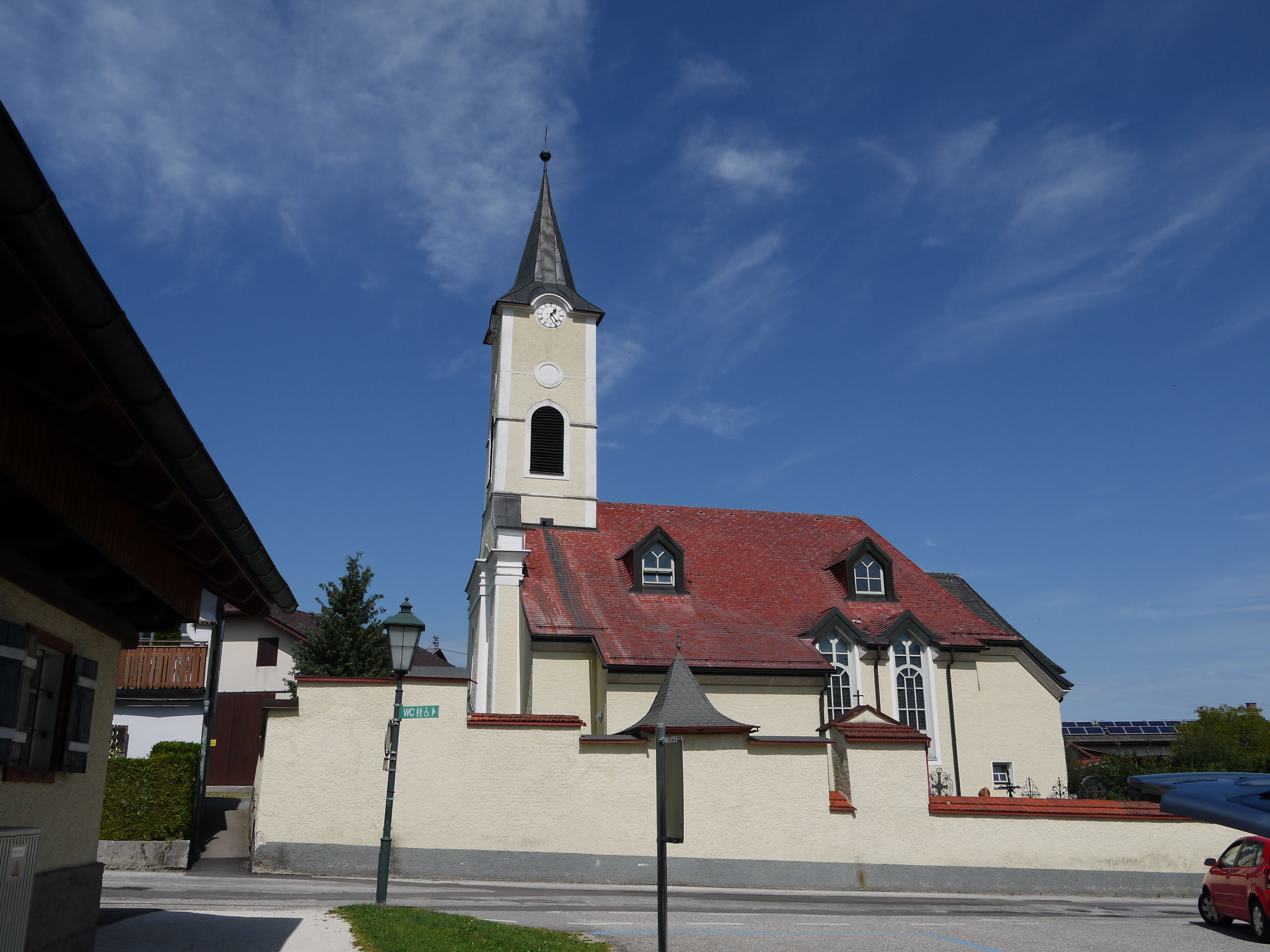

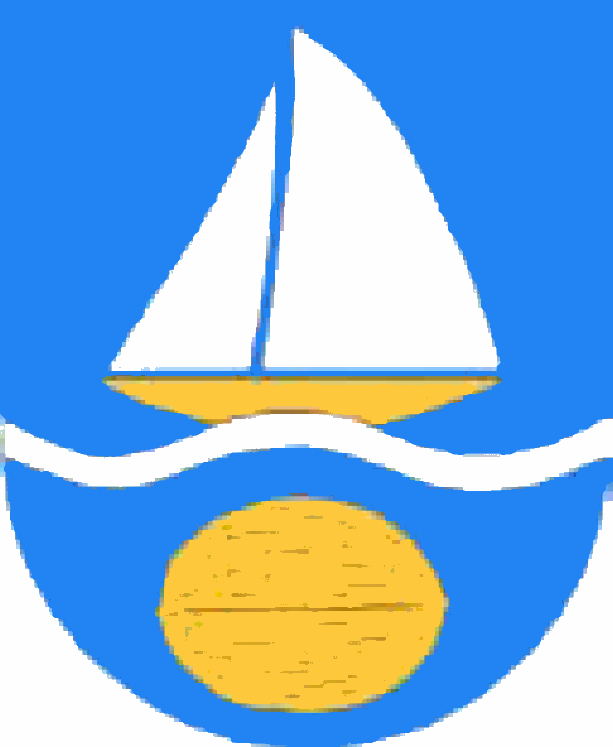
- Coat of arms

- Location within Austria
- Coordinates: 47°53′00″N 13°31′29″E
- Country: Austria
- State: Upper Austria
- District: Vöcklabruck

Government
  - Mayor: Ing. Joseph Mayrhauser (ÖVP)

Area
  - Total: 27.38 km^{2} (10.57 sq mi)
- Elevation: 500 m (1,600 ft)

Population (2018-01-01)
  - Total: 1,128
  - Density: 41.20/km^{2} (106.7/sq mi)
- Time zone: UTC+1 (CET)
  - Summer (DST): UTC+2 (CEST)
- Postal code: 4865
- Area code: 07666
- Vehicle registration: VB

Nußdorf am Attersee is a municipality in the district of Vöcklabruck in the Austrian state of Upper Austria.

== Population ==
Historical population
Year	Pop.	±%
1991	1,119	—
2001	1,096	−2.1%
2016	1,153	+5.2%
