= List of highways numbered 117 =

Route 117 or Highway 117 can refer to multiple roads:

== Argentina ==
- National Route 117

== Australia ==
- Separation Street

== Canada ==
- New Brunswick Route 117
- Ontario Highway 117 (former)
- Prince Edward Island Route 117
- Quebec Route 117

== Costa Rica ==
- National Route 117

== Germany ==
- Bundesautobahn 117

== India ==
- National Highway 117 (India)

== Japan ==
- Route 117 (Japan)

== United Kingdom ==
- A117 road

== United States ==
- U.S. Route 117
  - U.S. Route 117 (former)
- Alabama State Route 117
  - County Route 117 (Lee County, Alabama)
- Arkansas Highway 117
- California State Route 117 (former)
- Connecticut Route 117
- Florida State Road 117
  - County Road 117 (Duval County, Florida)
- Georgia State Route 117
- Illinois Route 117
- Indiana State Road 117
- Iowa Highway 117
- K-117 (Kansas highway)
- Kentucky Route 117
- Louisiana Highway 117
- Maine State Route 117
- Maryland Route 117
  - Maryland Route 117A
- Massachusetts Route 117
- M-117 (Michigan highway)
- Minnesota State Highway 117
- Missouri Route 117
- Montana Highway 117
- Nevada State Route 117
- New Hampshire Route 117
- County Route 117 (Bergen County, New Jersey)
- New Mexico State Road 117
- New York State Route 117
  - County Route 117 (Broome County, New York)
  - County Route 117 (Niagara County, New York)
  - County Route 117 (Onondaga County, New York)
  - County Route 117 (Rensselaer County, New York)
  - County Route 117 (Steuben County, New York)
  - County Route 117 (Suffolk County, New York)
  - County Route 117 (Sullivan County, New York)
  - County Route 117 (Tompkins County, New York)
- North Carolina Highway 117 (former)
- Ohio State Route 117
- Oklahoma State Highway 117
- Pennsylvania Route 117
- Rhode Island Route 117
  - Rhode Island Route 117A
- Tennessee State Route 117
- Texas State Highway 117 (former)
  - Texas State Highway Spur 117
  - Farm to Market Road 117
- Utah State Route 117
- Vermont Route 117
- Virginia State Route 117
  - Virginia State Route 117 (1923-1926) (former)
  - Virginia State Route 117 (1926-1928) (former)
  - Virginia State Route 117 (1928-1933) (former)
- Washington State Route 117
- Wisconsin Highway 117

Territories

- Puerto Rico Highway 117

== See also ==
- A117 road
- D117 road
- R117 road (Ireland)
- S117 (Amsterdam)

Preceded by 116	Lists of highways 117	Succeeded by 118
