= Burlington, Massachusetts =

- Town
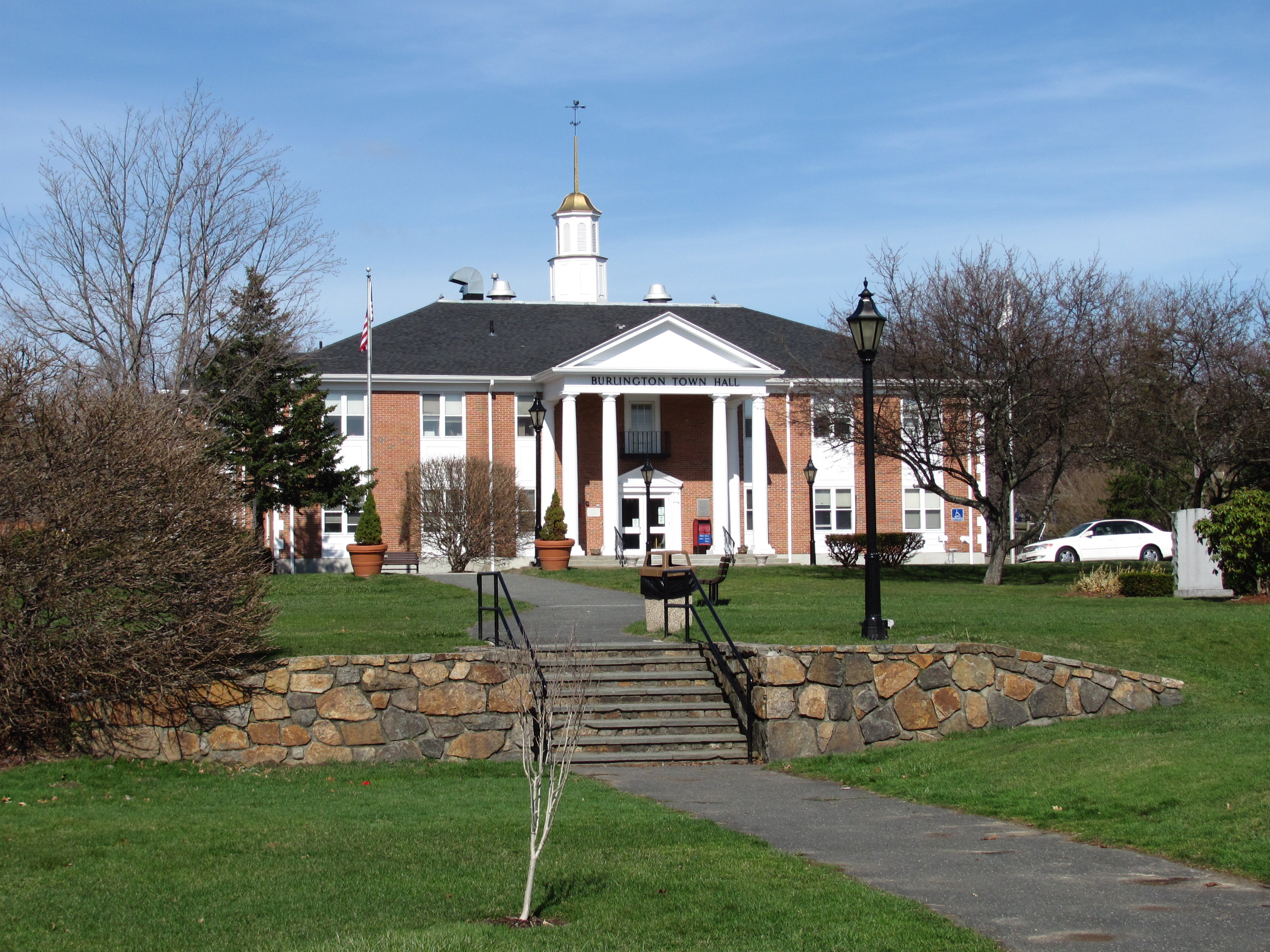
- Town Hall

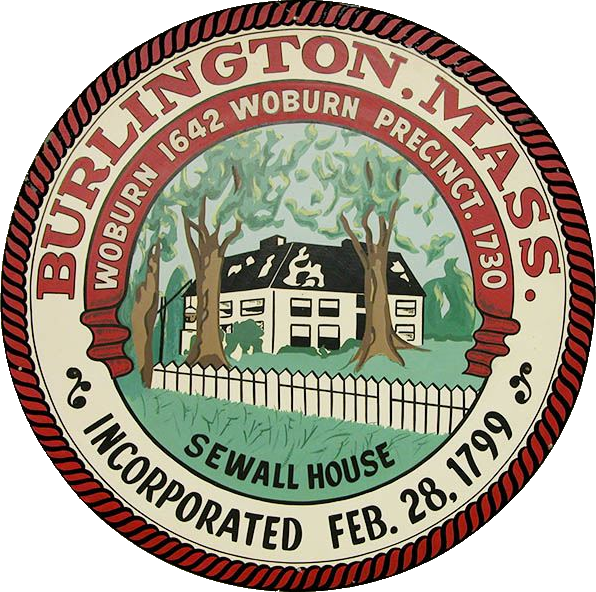
- Seal
- Nicknames: Burly, B-Town
- Motto: "Where Technology Goes To Work"
- Location in Middlesex County in Massachusetts
- Coordinates: 42°30′17″N 71°11′46″W
- Country: United States
- State: Massachusetts
- County: Middlesex
- Region: New England
- Settled: 1640
- Incorporated: February 28, 1799

Government
  - Type: Representative town meeting
  - Town Administrator: John Danizio

Area
  - Total: 11.9 sq mi (30.8 km^{2})
  - Land: 11.8 sq mi (30.6 km^{2})
  - Water: 0.077 sq mi (0.2 km^{2})
- Elevation: 217 ft (66 m)

Population (2020)
  - Total: 26,377
  - Density: 2,230/sq mi (862/km^{2})
- Demonym: Burlingtonian
- Time zone: UTC-5 (Eastern)
  - Summer (DST): UTC-4 (Eastern)
- ZIP codes: 01803, 01805
- Area code: 339 / 781 / 617
- FIPS code: 25-09840
- GNIS feature ID: 0618219
- Website: www.burlington.org

Burlington is a town in Middlesex County, Massachusetts, United States. The population was 26,377 at the 2020 census.

== History ==
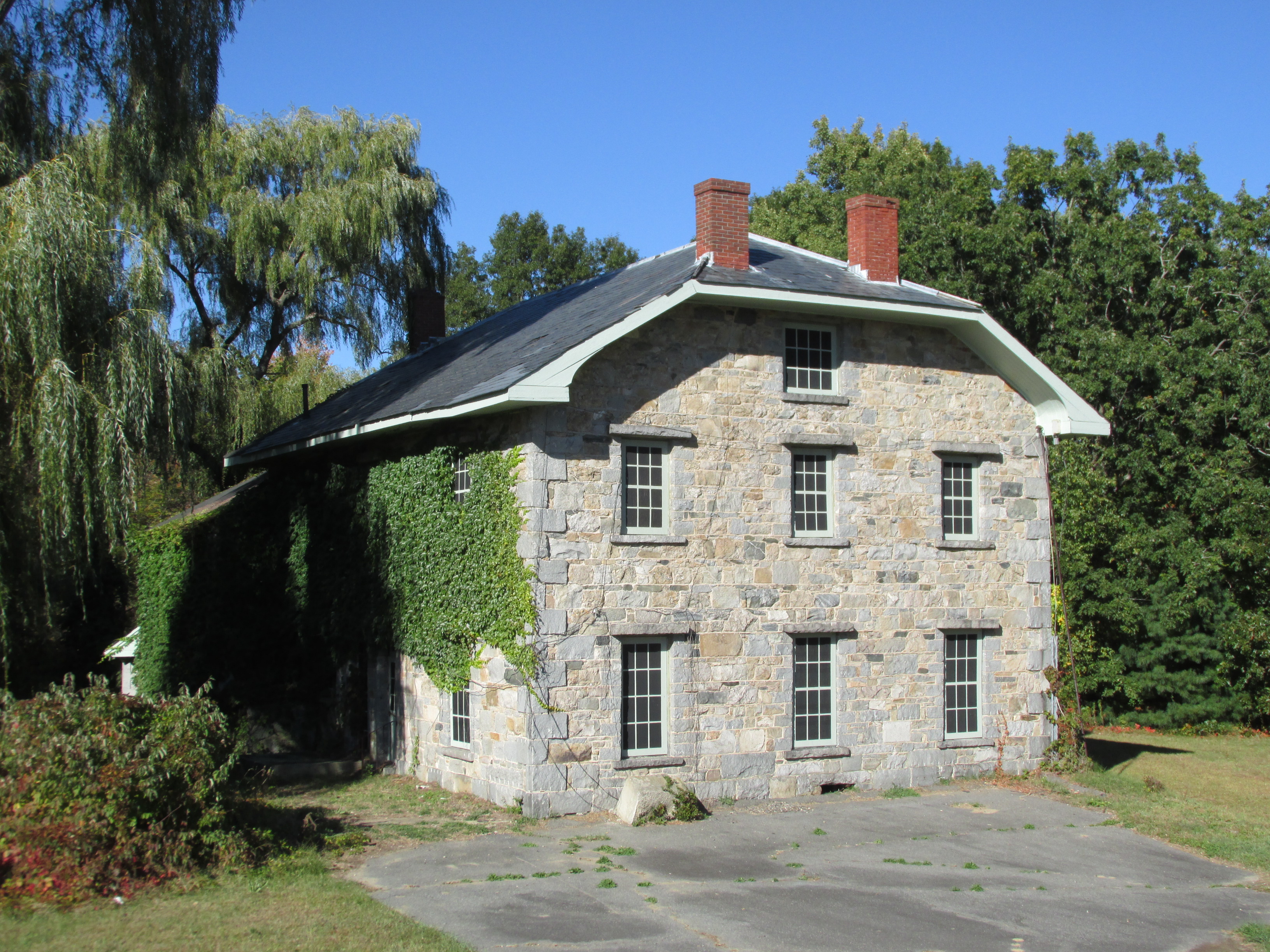
Helene Kent House

It is believed that Burlington takes its name from the English town of Bridlington, Yorkshire, but this has never been confirmed. (Note: There is one settlement and pond in England named Burlington in Sheriffhales, Shropshire search Ordnance Survey map – however the elegance of the early 18th century central London Palladian Burlington House may have inspired the choice of name.) It was first settled in 1641, and was officially incorporated on February 28, 1799; several of the early homesteads are still standing, such as the Francis Wyman House, dating from 1666. The town is sited on the watersheds of the Ipswich, Mystic, and Shawsheen rivers. In colonial times up through the late 19th century, there was an industry in the mills along Vine Brook, which runs from Lexington to Bedford and then empties into the Shawsheen River.

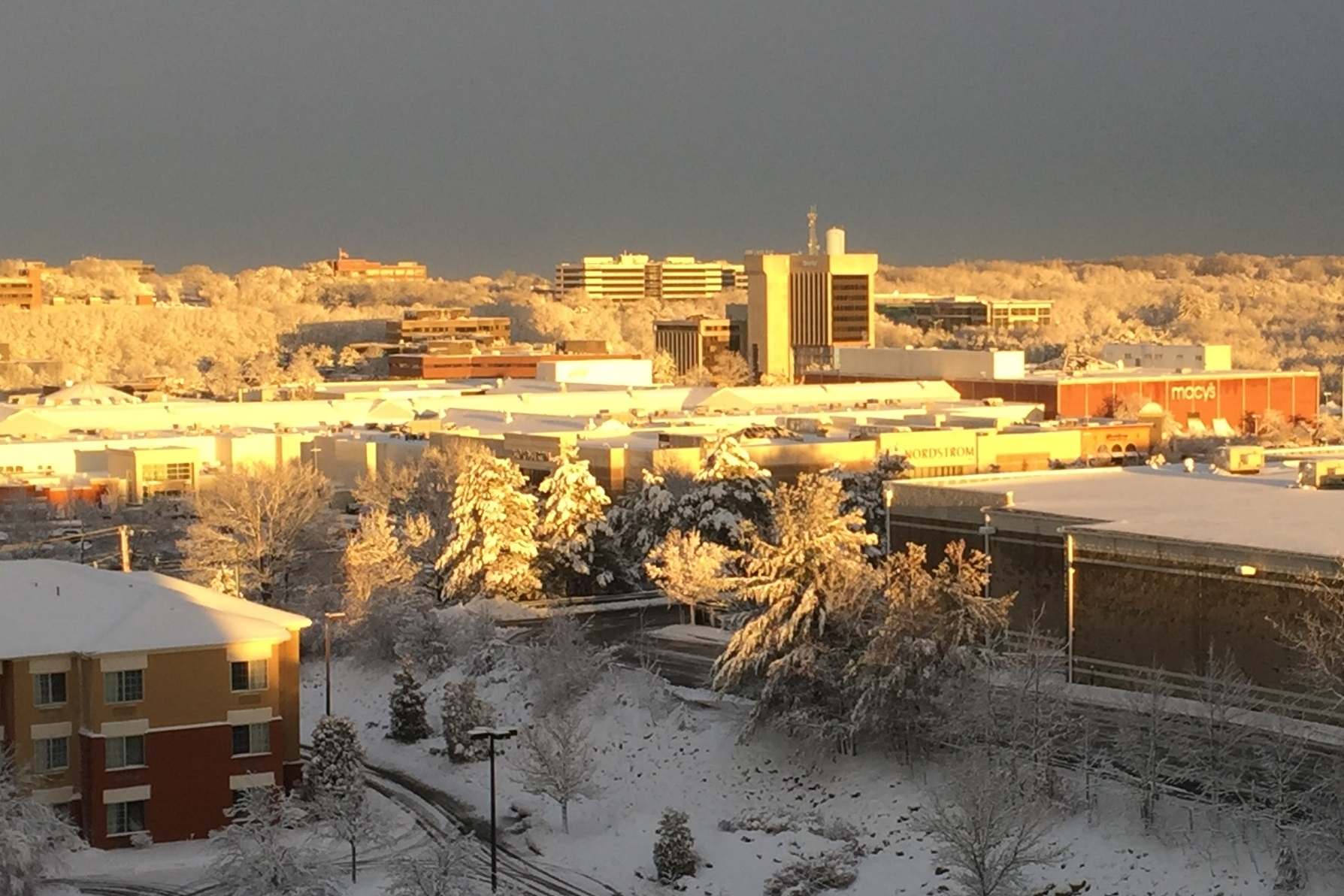
Business District

Burlington is now a suburban industrial town at the junction of the Boston-Merrimack corridor, but for most of its history, it was almost entirely agricultural, selling hops and rye to Boston and supplementing that income with small shoe-making shops. Early railroad expansion passed the town by (although the town was serviced by the Middlesex Turnpike), limiting its early development, and Burlington continued to cure hams for the Boston market and produce milk, fruit, and vegetables.

This picture changed drastically, however, as soon as Route 128 was built. The highway kicked off an enormous expansion, and between 1955 and 1965 Burlington was the fastest growing town in the state. In one five-year period, its population tripled as residential and commercial retail development exploded creating the town's present character. It is currently a residential and professional hub.

== Geography ==
Located in the Greater Boston Area of eastern Massachusetts, Burlington is bordered by Bedford on the west, Billerica on the north, Wilmington on the northeast, Woburn on the southeast, and Lexington on the south. Burlington is 12 miles (19 km) south of Lowell, 12 miles (19 km) northwest of Boston, 36 miles (58 km) southeast of Fitchburg, and 224 miles (360 km) from New York City. Its highest point is Greenleaf Mountain (290 feet (88 m) above sea level), and its lowest point is the Great Meadow 150 feet (46 m) above sea level. The elevation at Town Hall is 220 feet (67 m) above sea level. The largest body of water is the 500-million-US-gallon (1,900,000 m^{3}) Mill Pond Reservoir in the eastern part of the town.

According to the United States Census Bureau, the town has a total area of 11.9 square miles (31 km^{2}), of which 11.8 square miles (31 km^{2}) is land and 0.1 square miles (0.26 km^{2}), or 0.59%, is water. There are different area codes in Burlington: 781, 617, and 339.

== Demographics ==
Historical population
| Year | Pop. | ±% |
|---|---|---|
| 1850 | 545 | — |
| 1860 | 606 | +11.2% |
| 1870 | 626 | +3.3% |
| 1880 | 711 | +13.6% |
| 1890 | 617 | −13.2% |
| 1900 | 593 | −3.9% |
| 1910 | 591 | −0.3% |
| 1920 | 885 | +49.7% |
| 1930 | 1,722 | +94.6% |
| 1940 | 2,275 | +32.1% |
| 1950 | 3,250 | +42.9% |
| 1960 | 12,852 | +295.4% |
| 1970 | 21,980 | +71.0% |
| 1980 | 23,486 | +6.9% |
| 1990 | 23,302 | −0.8% |
| 2000 | 22,876 | −1.8% |
| 2010 | 24,498 | +7.1% |
| 2020 | 26,377 | +7.7% |
| 2024* | 26,977 | +2.3% |
* = population estimate. Source: United States census records and Population Estimates Program data.

As of the census of 2010, there were 24,498 people, 9,668 households, and 6,374 families residing in the town. The population density was 1,936.4 inhabitants per square mile (747.6/km^{2}). There were 8,445 housing units at an average density of 2,087.7 per square mile (806.1/km^{2}). The racial makeup of the town was 79.2% White, 3.3% Black or African American, 0.1% Native American, 13.4% Asian, 0.02% Pacific Islander, 0.32% from other races, and 0.86% from two or more races. Hispanic or Latino people of any race were 2.4% of the population.

There were 8,289 households, out of which 32.6% had children under the age of 18 living with them, 65.2% were married couples living together, 9.1% had a female householder with no husband present, and 23.1% were non-families. Of all households, 19.1% were made up of individuals, and 7.7% had someone living alone who was 65 years of age or older. The average household size was 2.76 and the average family size was 3.18.

In the town, the population was spread out, with 23.6% under the age of 18, 6.3% from 18 to 24, 31.1% from 25 to 44, 25.2% from 45 to 64, and 13.9% who were 65 years of age or older. The median age was 38 years. For every 100 females, there were 97.0 males. For every 100 females age 18 and over, there were 93.7 males.

In 2014, the median household income of the town stood at $95,465. The per capita income was $41,849 and 4.7% of the population lived below the poverty line. According to an earlier estimate from 2007, the median income for a household in the town was $86,052, and the median income for a family was $99,123. Males had a median income of $55,635 versus $36,486 for females. About 1.3% of families and 1.9% of the population were below the poverty line, including 2.8% of those under age 18 and 1.8% of those age 65 or over.

=== Foreign-born population ===
As of 2019, 23.8% of the residents of Burlington were born outside of the United States.

== Arts and culture ==
=== Points of interest ===
- The Burlington Town Common and Simonds Park area is in the center of town and there are multiple parks and public recreation facilities throughout town which have basketball courts, tennis courts, baseball fields, soccer fields, gymnasia, and an indoor skating rink (Burlington Ice Palace) and a skatepark.
- The Burlington Public Library is on Sears Street adjoining the Town Common.
- The Burlington Historical Museum, open during the Summer is located on Bedford Street at the intersection of Cambridge Street.
- The Meeting House of the Second Parish in Woburn is on Lexington Street, just off of the Town Common.

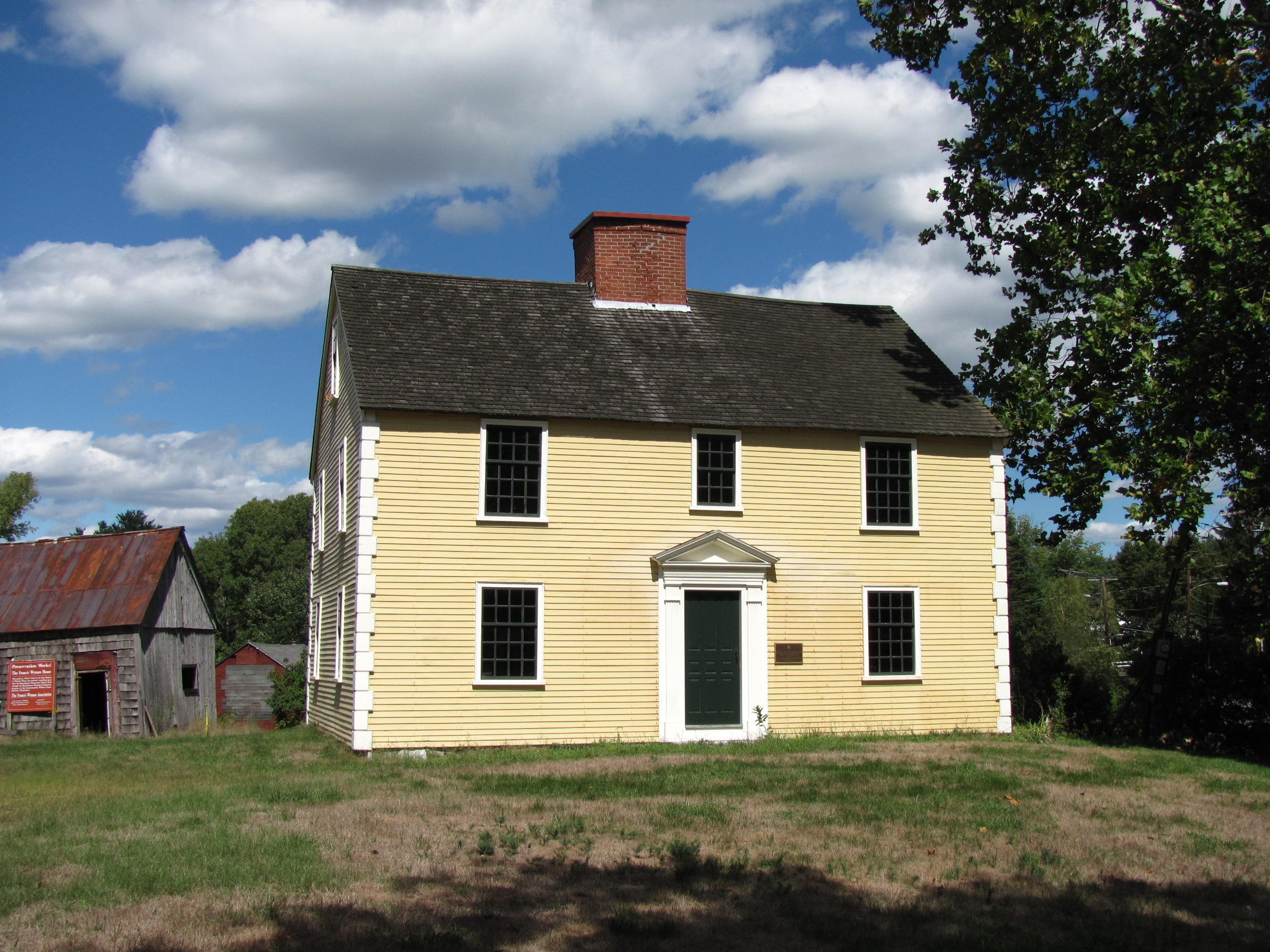
Francis Wyman House

- The Burlington Sculpture Park is located between the town's police station and the Grandview Tavern, across from the Common. It features a collection of sculptures from artists from around the globe along with a picnic area.
- The Mill Pond Conservation Area is in the eastern part of town bordering Woburn and Wilmington. The largest conservation area in Burlington, the Mill Pond Conservation Area includes over 140 acres (0.57 km^{2}) of rolling and steep terrain. Numerous marked and unmarked trails cross through the conservation area which allow for hiking or bicycle riding. The land has numerous access points, including the corner of Winter and Chestnut Streets, through a gate at the end of Hansen Avenue, and through a gate at the end of the offshoot from Town Line Road.
  - The Mill Pond is located within the Mill Pond Conservation Area. Fishing is allowed with a special permit. The pond is feeding one of the two water treatment plants in Burlington. The Mill Pond Water Treatment Plant was upgraded in 2007 and has the capacity to treat up to 6 million US gallons (23,000 m^{3}) of water per day. On the pond's island there is a rope swing, an attraction for many locals.
- The Burlington Landlocked Forest, also known as the Burlington Landlocked Parcel, consists of 270 acres (1.1 km^{2}) spanning the borders of Burlington, Bedford, and Lexington, and contains 12 miles (19 km) of hiking-mountain biking trails, vernal pools, abundant wildlife, historic stone walls and other structures, meadows, and old-growth forest. The majority of the land is owned by the Town of Burlington, which has kept it as open space since acquiring it by eminent domain in 1985. It borders Route 3 in Burlington to the east, Route 62 in Bedford to the north, conservation land in Lexington to the west, and Route 128 to the South. The main trailhead to the Forest is located at the intersection of Routes 3 and 62 in Bedford. A secondary trailhead can be found on Turning Mill Road in Lexington, under the power lines at the site of the future West Lexington Greenway. At the time of its purchase, the Landlocked Parcel was not protected land. There were discussions in 2008 between the Town of Burlington and Patriot Partners to sell the land to the developer who would develop part of the forest to build a large biotechnology complex. A citizen group, Friends of the Burlington Landlocked Forest, was organized to prevent this sale and to make the Forest designated conservation land. In 2017, the Burlington Town Meeting voted to rezone the land as open space.
- Mary Cummings Park was envisioned as one of the great public parks of Greater Boston, but it fell into great neglect. This 216-acre (0.87 km^{2}) public park on the Burlington-Woburn border was created by Mary P.C. Cummings in 1927 and was entrusted to the City of Boston to be kept forever open as a recreational park. In recent years, the City of Boston has tried to discourage public access and has investigated selling the park to fund the Rose Kennedy Greenway. The Burlington RC Flyers maintain a field in the park. The park is now managed by the Trustees of Reservation.
- The Kevin James movie Paul Blart: Mall Cop was filmed in the Burlington Mall, and scenes from the Ben Affleck movie The Company Men were filmed in an office building off of Wall Street, near Route 128.

== Government ==
Burlington is governed by a 126-member representative Town Meeting (18 representatives elected per precinct) and a five-member executive Select Board.

Burlington Cable Access Television (BCAT) is a non-profit public-access television cable TV facility that was formed in 1987. BCAT operates three: public, educational, and government access (PEG) cable TV channels. Town meetings and events can also be seen on demand on BCAT's website.

=== Burlington Police Department ===
The Burlington Police Department (BPD) has the primary responsibility for law enforcement and investigation in the town of Burlington. The Burlington Police Department has 64 sworn officers who are commanded by Chief Thomas Browne. There are several Divisions within the BPD, including Patrol, Detectives, Domestic Violence, Traffic, Community Service, School Resource, Crime Analysis, Records, K-9, and the Bike Unit. The Burlington Police Department is also one of 54 law enforcement agencies that comprise the North Eastern Massachusetts Law Enforcement Council (NEMLEC). The Burlington Police Department is located at 45 Center Street in Burlington.

Route 128/I-95 and Route 3 traverse through Burlington and motor vehicle laws are enforced primarily by the Massachusetts State Police on these roadways.

=== Burlington Fire Department ===
The Burlington Fire Department has a force of 44 firefighters and 16 officers who are commanded by Chief James Browne. Two engines, one tower, and two ALS ambulances respond from two fire stations and average over 3,200 runs annually. Burlington also operates a hazardous materials/cascade unit and a brush unit. The Burlington Fire Department Headquarters is located at 21 Center Street in Burlington. The Burlington Fire Department Station Two is located at 114 Terrace Hall Avenue in Burlington.

== Education ==
Burlington has six public schools (four elementary schools, one middle school, and one high school) which comprise the Burlington Public School District. The elementary schools are Fox Hill, Francis Wyman, Memorial, and Pine Glen. The middle school is Marshall Simonds, and one of the town parks is named after Marshall Simonds. The high school is Burlington High School. Burlington is also served by the Shawsheen Valley Technical High School. In addition, it is home to several private schools.

The town operates a Before and After School Program and offers an integrated preschool program.

Burlington is also the home to a satellite campus of Northeastern University.

== Economy ==
Companies based in Burlington include:

- Aura (antivirus)
- Avid Technology
- Desktop Metal
- Endurance International Group
- Greylock Partners
- Keurig Dr Pepper
- Lahey Hospital & Medical Center
- Nuance Communications.
- Dynatech Corporation
- Sigma-Aldrich

== Infrastructure ==
=== Transportation ===
Routes 128 (I-95), 3, 3A and, 62 pass through Burlington. MBTA bus routes 350, 351, 352 and 354 operated by the MBTA run through the town, as do Lowell Regional Transit Authority, Lexpress (Lexington), and B-Line (Burlington) buses. The closest MBTA 'T' subway stations are Alewife, Cambridge, on the Red Line, 9 miles (14 km) to the south-east (which has a large parking garage) and Wellington Station, Medford, on the Orange Line, roughly 10 miles (16 km) to the east (which also has a large parking garage). MBTA Commuter Rail and Logan Express services are available at the Anderson Regional Transportation Center in neighboring Woburn, about 3 miles (4.8 km) to the east.

== Notable people ==
- James MacGregor Burns, Pulitzer Prize winning historian and political scientist
- Peter Carruthers and Kitty Carruthers, silver medalists, 1984 Winter Olympics, pairs figure skating
- Roger Cook, head landscaper, This Old House
- Martha E. Sewall Curtis (1858–1915), suffragist, writer
- Jeremy Dooley, author, internet personality on Roosterteeth.com and YouTube
- Kali Flanagan, 2018 Winter Olympics gold medalist, ice hockey
- Mark Fusco and Scott Fusco, 1984 Winter Olympics, US Olympic hockey team
- David Lovering, drummer of the alternative rock band Pixies
- Roderick MacKinnon, co-recipient, 2003 Nobel Prize in Chemistry
- Stephen P. Mugar, founder of the Star Market chain of supermarkets and philanthropist
- Jay Pandolfo, NHL forward, primarily with the New Jersey Devils and assistant coach of the Boston Bruins
- Amy Poehler, actress and comedian, Saturday Night Live, Parks and Recreation
- Nithya Raman, Mayor-Elect of Los Angeles
- Steve Strachan, NFL running back, Los Angeles Raiders
- James Walker, president, Harvard University, 1853–1860
- Steven Wright, actor, comedian

== Notes and references ==
=== General sources ===
- Robert J. Costa (August 11, 2001). Burlington. Images of America). Arcadia Publishing. ISBN 978-0-7385-0902-0.
