= List of highways numbered 122 =

Route 122 or Highway 122 may refer to:

== Brazil ==
- BR-122

== Canada ==
- New Brunswick Route 122
- Ontario Highway 122 (former)
- Prince Edward Island Route 122
- Quebec Route 122

== Costa Rica ==
- National Route 122

== Cuba ==
- Punta de Carta Road (1–112)
- Road to Bolondron (3–122)

== India ==
- National Highway 122 (India)
- State Highway 122 (Rajasthan)

== Japan ==
- Japan National Route 122

== Nigeria ==
- A122 highway (Nigeria)

== United Kingdom ==
- B122 road.

== United States ==
- U.S. Route 122 (former)
- Alabama State Route 122
  - County Route 122 (Lee County, Alabama)
- Arkansas Highway 122
- California State Route 122 (never built)
- Connecticut Route 122
- Florida State Road 122
  - County Road 122 (Baker County, Florida)
- Georgia State Route 122
- Hawaii Route 122
- Illinois Route 122
- Indiana State Road 122 (former)
- Iowa Highway 122
- K-122 (Kansas highway) (former)
- Kentucky Route 122
- Louisiana Highway 122
- Maine State Route 122
- Maryland Route 122
- Massachusetts Route 122
  - Massachusetts Route 122A
- M-122 (Michigan highway) (former)
- Minnesota State Highway 122 (former)
  - County Road 122 (Hennepin County, Minnesota)
- Missouri Route 122
- New Hampshire Route 122
- New Jersey Route 122
- New Mexico State Road 122
- New York State Route 122
  - County Route 122 (Erie County, New York)
  - County Route 122 (Fulton County, New York)
  - County Route 122 (Jefferson County, New York)
  - County Route 122 (Montgomery County, New York)
  - County Route 122 (Niagara County, New York)
  - County Route 122 (Onondaga County, New York)
  - County Route 122 (Rensselaer County, New York)
  - County Route 122 (Steuben County, New York)
  - County Route 122 (Tompkins County, New York)
- North Carolina Highway 122
- Ohio State Route 122
- Rhode Island Route 122
- South Carolina Highway 122
- Tennessee State Route 122
- Texas State Highway 122 (former)
  - Texas State Highway Spur 122
  - Farm to Market Road 122
- Utah State Route 122
- Vermont Route 122
- Virginia State Route 122
  - Virginia State Route 122 (1923-1925) (former)
  - Virginia State Route 122 (1925-1928) (former)
  - Virginia State Route 122 (1928-1933) (former)
- Washington State Route 122
- West Virginia Route 122
- Wisconsin Highway 122

Territories

- Puerto Rico Highway 122

Preceded by 121	Lists of highways 122	Succeeded by 123
