= List of highways numbered 126 =

Route 126 or Highway 126 can refer to multiple roads:

== Canada ==
- New Brunswick Route 126
- Ontario Highway 126 (former)
- Prince Edward Island Route 126

== Costa Rica ==
- National Route 126

== Japan ==
- Japan National Route 126

== Nigeria ==
- A126 highway (Nigeria)

== United Kingdom ==
- A126 road
- B126 road

== United States ==
- Interstate 126
- U.S. Route 126 (former)
- Alabama State Route 126
- Arkansas Highway 126
- California State Route 126
- Connecticut Route 126
- Florida State Road 126
- Georgia State Route 126
- Illinois Route 126
- Indiana State Road 126 (former)
- Iowa Highway 126 (former)
- K-126 (Kansas highway)
- Kentucky Route 126
- Louisiana Highway 126
- Maine State Route 126
- Maryland Route 126 (former)
- Massachusetts Route 126
- M-126 (Michigan highway) (former)
- Missouri Route 126
- New Hampshire Route 126
- County Route 126 (Bergen County, New Jersey)
- New Mexico State Road 126
- New York State Route 126
  - County Route 126 (Herkimer County, New York)
  - County Route 126 (Montgomery County, New York)
  - County Route 126 (Niagara County, New York)
  - County Route 126 (Onondaga County, New York)
  - County Route 126 (Rensselaer County, New York)
  - County Route 126 (Seneca County, New York)
  - County Route 126 (Tompkins County, New York)
- North Carolina Highway 126
- Ohio State Route 126
- Oklahoma State Highway 126 (former)
- Oregon Route 126
- Pennsylvania Route 126 (former)
- Rhode Island Route 126
- South Carolina Highway 126
- Tennessee State Route 126
- Texas State Highway 126 (former)
  - Texas State Highway Spur 126
  - Farm to Market Road 126
- Utah State Route 126
- Virginia State Route 126
  - Virginia State Route 126 (1928-1933) (former)
  - Virginia State Route 126 (1933-1944) (former)
- Washington State Route 126 (former)
- Wisconsin Highway 126

Preceded by 125	Lists of highways 126	Succeeded by 127
