= List of highways numbered 121 =

Route 121 or Highway 121 can refer to multiple roads:

== Argentina ==
- National Route 121

== Canada ==
- New Brunswick Route 121
- Ontario Highway 121
- Prince Edward Island Route 121

== Costa Rica ==
- National Route 121

== Japan ==
- Japan National Route 121

== Nigeria ==
- A121 highway (Nigeria)

== United Kingdom ==
- A121 road .
- B121 road.

== United States ==
- U.S. Route 121 (proposed)
  - U.S. Route 121 (former)
- Alabama State Route 121 (former)
  - County Route 121 (Lee County, Alabama)
- Arkansas Highway 121
- California State Route 121
- Colorado State Highway 121
- Connecticut Route 121
- Florida State Road 121
  - County Road 121A (Alachua County, Florida)
  - County Road 121 (Duval County, Florida)
- Georgia State Route 121
- Hawaii Route 121
- Illinois Route 121
- Indiana State Road 121
- K-121 (Kansas highway) (former)
- Kentucky Route 121
- Louisiana Highway 121
- Maine State Route 121
- Maryland Route 121
- Massachusetts Route 121
- M-121 (Michigan highway)
- Minnesota State Highway 121
  - County Road 121 (Hennepin County, Minnesota)
- Missouri Route 121
- Nebraska Highway 121
- Nevada State Route 121
- New Hampshire Route 121
  - New Hampshire Route 121A
- New Mexico State Road 121
- New York State Route 121
  - County Route 121 (Herkimer County, New York)
  - County Route 121 (Jefferson County, New York)
  - County Route 121 (Montgomery County, New York)
  - County Route 121 (Niagara County, New York)
  - County Route 121 (Seneca County, New York)
  - County Route 121 (Steuben County, New York)
  - County Route 121 (Sullivan County, New York)
- North Carolina Highway 121
- Ohio State Route 121
- Pennsylvania Route 121
- Rhode Island Route 121
- South Carolina Highway 121
- Texas State Highway 121
  - former 121 Tollway (now Sam Rayburn Tollway)
  - Texas State Highway Loop 121
  - Texas State Highway Spur 121 (former)
  - Farm to Market Road 121
- Utah State Route 121
- Vermont Route 121
- Virginia State Route 121
  - Virginia State Route 121 (1923-1926) (former)
  - Virginia State Route 121 (1927-1928) (former)
  - Virginia State Route 121 (1928-1933) (former)
- Washington State Route 121
- Wisconsin Highway 121

Territories

- Puerto Rico Highway 121

Preceded by 120	Lists of highways 121	Succeeded by 122
