= Utah State Route 120 (disambiguation) =

Utah State Route 120 may refer to:

- Utah State Route 120 (1931-1935), a former state highway from Tropic to Henrieville
- Utah State Route 120 (1935-1945), a former state highway from SR-56 to Iron Mountain
- Utah State Route 120 (1945-1969), a former state highway from Enterprise to the Nevada line
- Utah State Route 120, the modern route through Richfield

== See also ==
- List of highways numbered 120
