= Plisko Polje =

Coordinates: 43°02′03″N 16°11′01″E

- Village
- Interactive map of Plisko Polje
- Country: Croatia
- County: Split-Dalmatia County
- Town: Vis

Area
  - Total: 3.3 km^{2} (1.3 sq mi)

Population (2021)
  - Total: 20
  - Density: 6.1/km^{2} (16/sq mi)
- Time zone: UTC+1 (CET)
  - Summer (DST): UTC+2 (CEST)

Plisko Polje is a village in Croatia, located on the island of Vis. It is connected by the D117 highway.
