= Meeting House of the Second Parish in Woburn =

Historic church in Massachusetts, United States

- United Church of Christ, Congregational, Burlington, MA
- U.S. National Register of Historic Places
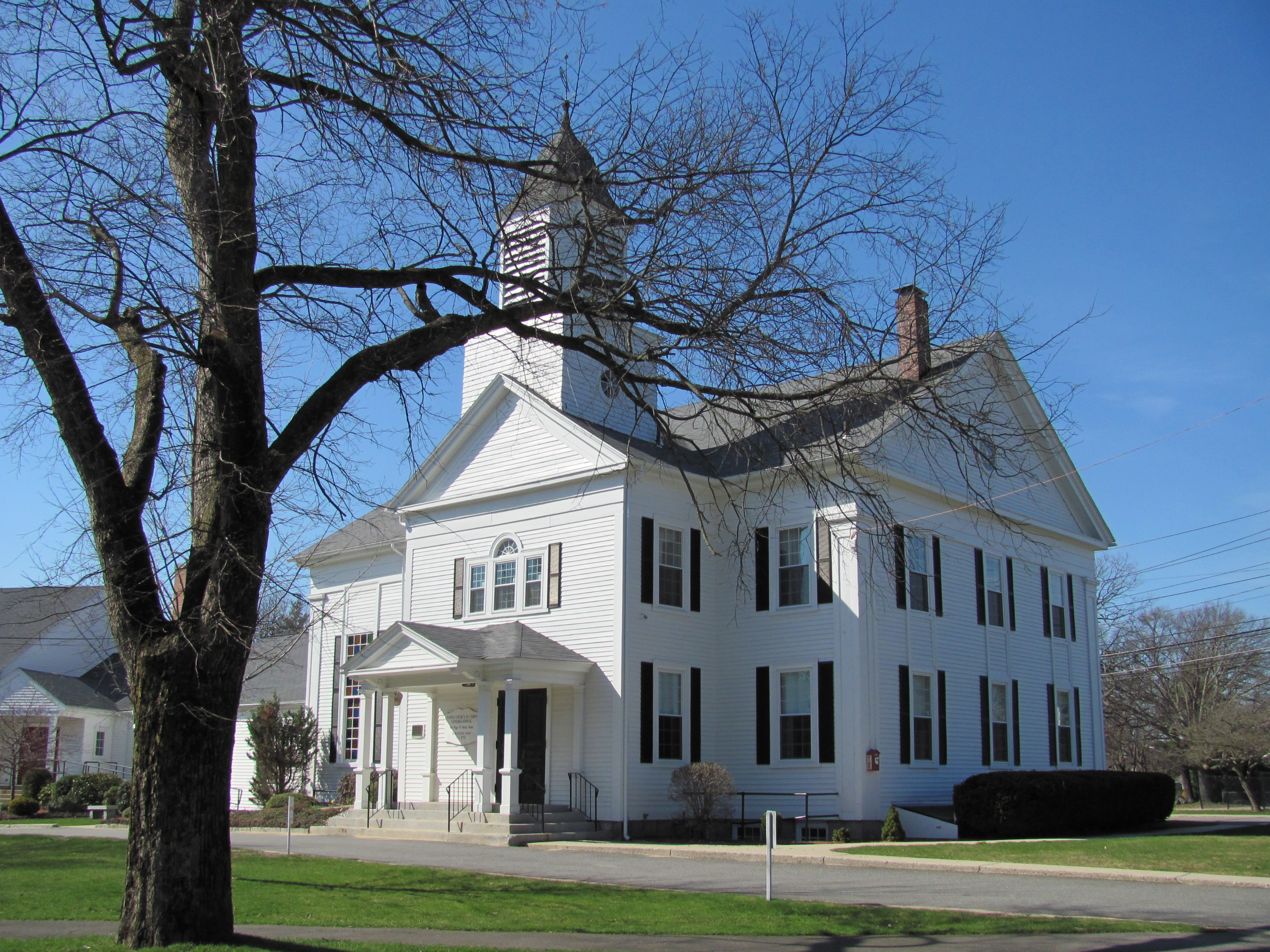
- Woburn Second Parish Meeting House

- Location within Massachusetts Location within the United States
- Location: 6 Lexington Street, Burlington, Massachusetts
- Coordinates: 42°30′16″N 71°11′56″W
- Built: 1732
- Architectural style: Colonial
- MPS: First Period Buildings of Eastern Massachusetts TR
- NRHP reference No.: 90000167
- Added to NRHP: March 9, 1990

The United Church of Christ, Congregational is a historic Congregational church in Burlington, Massachusetts. Built in 1732, it is one of the oldest religious structures in Massachusetts, and one of a small number of pre-19th century church buildings. It was redesigned in 1846 to bring it into the then-popular Greek Revival style, extending it in length and adding a somewhat Gothic-looking steeple. In 1888, when the Colonial Revival was becoming popular, a number of these changes were in effect reversed, restoring a more Colonial-style steeple.

When built, the area that is now Burlington was still part of Woburn, and this church was the second, built to serve what is now Burlington. It was the site in 1775 of some critical meetings, both military and political, of Patriots in the American Revolutionary War. The church served as a parish of Massachusetts' state funded church until the churches were disaffiliated from the state government in the early nineteenth century.

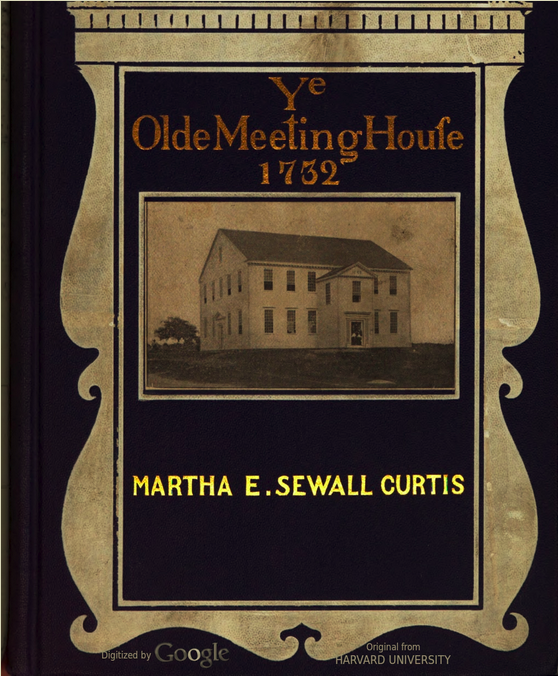
Ye old meeting house (1909)

In 1909, Martha E. Sewall Curtis published, Ye olde meeting house : addresses and verses relating to the meeting house, Burlington, Middlesex County, Massachusetts, built 1732, and other historical addresses.

The meeting house was added to the National Register of Historic Places in 1990. The congregation is currently affiliated with the United Church of Christ.

== See also ==
- National Register of Historic Places listings in Middlesex County, Massachusetts
