= List of highways numbered 119 =

The following highways are numbered 119:

== Argentina ==
- National Route 119

== Canada ==
- New Brunswick Route 119
- Ontario Highway 119 (former)
- Prince Edward Island Route 119

== Costa Rica ==
- National Route 119

== India ==
- National Highway 119 (India)

== Japan ==
- Japan National Route 119

== Philippines ==
- National Route 119 (Philippines)

== United Kingdom ==
- A119 road
- B119 road.

== United States ==
- U.S. Route 119
- Alabama State Route 119
  - County Route 119 (Lee County, Alabama)
- Arkansas Highway 119
- California State Route 119
- Colorado State Highway 119
- Florida State Road 119 (former)
  - County Road 119 (Duval County, Florida)
- Georgia State Route 119
- Illinois Route 119
- Indiana State Road 119
- K-119 (Kansas highway)
- Louisiana Highway 119
- Maine State Route 119
- Maryland Route 119
- Massachusetts Route 119
- M-119 (Michigan highway)
- Minnesota State Highway 119
- Missouri Route 119
- Nevada State Route 119
- New Hampshire Route 119
- County Route 119 (Bergen County, New Jersey)
- New Mexico State Road 119
- New York State Route 119
  - County Route 119 (Cortland County, New York)
  - County Route 119 (Erie County, New York)
  - County Route 119 (Monroe County, New York)
  - County Route 119 (Montgomery County, New York)
  - County Route 119 (Schenectady County, New York)
  - County Route 119 (Seneca County, New York)
  - County Route 119 (Steuben County, New York)
  - County Route 119 (Tompkins County, New York)
- North Carolina Highway 119
- Ohio State Route 119
- South Carolina Highway 119
- Tennessee State Route 119
- Texas State Highway 119
  - Texas State Highway Spur 119
  - Farm to Market Road 119
- Utah State Route 119
- Vermont Route 119
- Virginia State Route 119
  - Virginia State Route 119 (1924-1926) (former)
  - Virginia State Route 119 (1926-1928) (former)
  - Virginia State Route 119 (1928-1933) (former)
  - Virginia State Route 119 (1933-1964) (former)
- Washington State Route 119
- Wisconsin Highway 119

Territories

- Puerto Rico Highway 119

| Preceded by 118 | Lists of highways 119 | Succeeded by 120 |
