= List of highways numbered 118 =

Route 118 or Highway 118 can refer to multiple roads:

== Argentina ==
- National Route 118

== Canada ==
- British Columbia Highway 118
- New Brunswick Route 118
- Nova Scotia Highway 118
- Ontario Highway 118
- Prince Edward Island Route 118

== Costa Rica ==
- National Route 118

== India ==
- National Highway 118 (India)

== Japan ==
- Route 118 (Japan)

== United Kingdom ==
- A118 road
- B118 road

== United States ==
- U.S. Route 118 (former)
- Alabama State Route 118
  - County Route 118 (Lee County, Alabama)
- Arkansas Highway 118
- California State Route 118
- Connecticut Route 118
- Georgia State Route 118
- Illinois Route 118 (former)
- Indiana State Road 118 (former)
- Kentucky Route 118
- Louisiana Highway 118
- Maine State Route 118
- Maryland Route 118
- Massachusetts Route 118
- M-118 (Michigan highway) (former)
- Minnesota State Highway 118 (former)
- Missouri Route 118
- Nevada State Route 118
- New Hampshire Route 118
- New Mexico State Road 118
- New York State Route 118
  - County Route 118 (Erie County, New York)
  - County Route 118 (Herkimer County, New York)
  - County Route 118 (Rockland County, New York)
    - County Route 118A (Rockland County, New York)
  - County Route 118 (Wayne County, New York)
- North Carolina Highway 118
- Ohio State Route 118
- Pennsylvania Route 118
- Rhode Island Route 118
- South Carolina Highway 118
- Tennessee State Route 118
- Texas State Highway 118
  - Texas State Highway Loop 118
  - Texas State Highway Spur 118
  - Farm to Market Road 118
- Utah State Route 118
- Vermont Route 118
- Virginia State Route 118
  - Virginia State Route 118 (1924-1928) (former)
  - Virginia State Route 118 (1928-1933) (former)
- Wisconsin Highway 118

Territories

- Puerto Rico Highway 118

== See also ==
- D118 road
- P118, a state regional road in Latvia
- R118 road (Ireland)
- S118 (Amsterdam)

Preceded by 117	Lists of highways 118	Succeeded by 119
