= List of highways numbered 125 =

Route 125 or Highway 125 can refer to multiple roads:

== Canada ==
- Winnipeg Route 125
- Nova Scotia Highway 125
- Ontario Highway 125
- Prince Edward Island Route 125
- Quebec Route 125

== Costa Rica ==
- National Route 125

== India ==
- National Highway 125 (Uttarakhand)

== Italy ==
- State road 125

== Japan ==
- Japan National Route 125

== Mexico ==
- Mexican Federal Highway 125

== Nigeria ==
- A125 highway (Nigeria)

== United Kingdom ==
- A125 road
- B125 road

== United States ==
- Interstate 125 (unsigned)
- Alabama State Route 125
  - County Route 125 (Lee County, Alabama)
- Arkansas Highway 125
- California State Route 125
- Colorado State Highway 125
- Connecticut Route 125
- Florida State Road 125 (former)
  - County Road 125 (Baker County, Florida)
  - County Road 125 (Bradford County, Florida)
- Georgia State Route 125
- Illinois Route 125
- Iowa Highway 125 (former)
- Kentucky Route 125
- Louisiana Highway 125
- Maine State Route 125
- Maryland Route 125
- Massachusetts Route 125
- M-125 (Michigan highway)
- Missouri Route 125
- New Hampshire Route 125
- New Mexico State Road 125
- New York State Route 125
  - County Route 125 (Cortland County, New York)
  - County Route 125 (Fulton County, New York)
  - County Route 125 (Jefferson County, New York)
  - County Route 125 (Monroe County, New York)
  - County Route 125 (Montgomery County, New York)
  - County Route 125 (Niagara County, New York)
  - County Route 125 (Onondaga County, New York)
  - County Route 125 (Rensselaer County, New York)
  - County Route 125 (Seneca County, New York)
  - County Route 125 (Steuben County, New York)
  - County Route 125 (Tompkins County, New York)
- North Carolina Highway 125
- Ohio State Route 125
- Oklahoma State Highway 125
- Pennsylvania Route 125
- South Carolina Highway 125
- Tennessee State Route 125
- Texas State Highway 125
  - Texas State Highway Loop 125 (former)
  - Texas State Highway Spur 125
  - Farm to Market Road 125
- Utah State Route 125
- Vermont Route 125
- Virginia State Route 125
  - Virginia State Route 125 (1924-1928) (former)
- Washington State Route 125
- West Virginia Route 125 (proposed)
- Wisconsin Highway 125

Territories

- Puerto Rico Highway 125
  - Puerto Rico Highway 125R

Preceded by 124	Lists of highways 125	Succeeded by 126
