= Francis Wyman House =

Historic house in Massachusetts, United States

- U.S. National Register of Historic Places
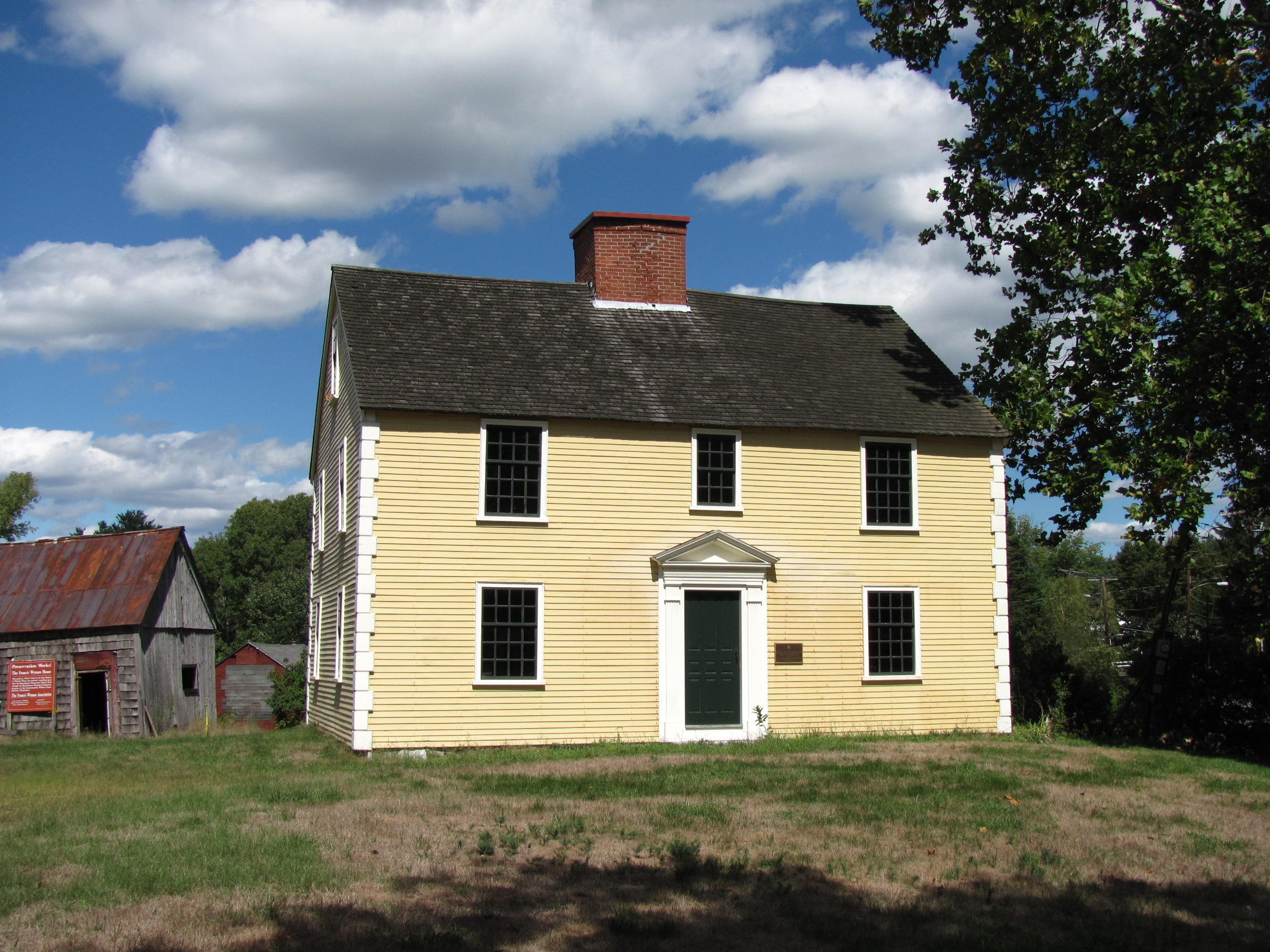
- Francis Wyman House

- Location within Massachusetts Location within the United States
- Location: Burlington, Massachusetts
- Coordinates: 42°30′59.2″N 71°13′32.6″W
- Built: ca. 1730
- NRHP reference No.: 75000255
- Added to NRHP: March 17, 1975

The Francis Wyman House is an historic house at 56 Francis Wyman Road in Burlington, Massachusetts.

Built ca. 1730, the Wyman House was added to the National Register of Historic Places in 1975.

On November 26, 1996, a fire severely burned the inside of the house. During the summer of 2012 the house was open to the public for the first time ever.

The house was named as one of the 1,000 places to visit in Massachusetts by the Great Places in Massachusetts Commission.

== See also ==
- List of the oldest buildings in Massachusetts
- National Register of Historic Places listings in Middlesex County, Massachusetts
