= Podšpilje =

Coordinates: 43°01′40.07″N 16°08′15.73″E

- Village
- Interactive map of Podšpilje
- Country: Croatia
- County: Split-Dalmatia
- Island: Vis

Area
  - Total: 1.1 km^{2} (0.42 sq mi)

Population (2021)
  - Total: 10
  - Density: 9.1/km^{2} (24/sq mi)
- Time zone: UTC+1 (CET)
  - Summer (DST): UTC+2 (CEST)

Podšpilje is a village in Croatia on the island of Vis. It is connected by the D117 highway.
