= List of highways numbered 124 =

The following highways are numbered 124:

== Cambodia ==
- National Road 124 (Cambodia)

== Canada ==
- New Brunswick Route 124
- Ontario Highway 124
- Prince Edward Island Route 124

== Costa Rica ==
- National Route 124

== Japan ==
- Japan National Route 124

== Nigeria ==
- A124 highway (Nigeria)

== United Kingdom ==
- A124 road
- B124 road

== United States ==
- Interstate 124 (unsigned)
- U.S. Route 124 (former)
- Alabama State Route 124
  - County Route 124 (Lee County, Alabama)
- Arkansas Highway 124
- California State Route 124
- Connecticut Route 124
- County Road 124 (Baker County, Florida)
  - County Road 124 (Levy County, Florida)
- Georgia State Route 124
- Illinois Route 124
- Indiana State Road 124
- Iowa Highway 124 (former)
- K-124 (Kansas highway) (former)
- Kentucky Route 124
- Louisiana Highway 124
- Louisiana State Route 124 (former)
- Maine State Route 124
- Maryland Route 124
- Massachusetts Route 124
- M-124 (Michigan highway)
- Minnesota State Highway 124 (former)
- Missouri Route 124
- New Hampshire Route 124
- New Jersey Route 124
- County Route 124 (Bergen County, New Jersey)
- New Mexico State Road 124
- New York State Route 124
- County Route 124 (Montgomery County, New York)
- County Route 124 (Onondaga County, New York)
- County Route 124 (Steuben County, New York)
- North Carolina Highway 124
- Ohio State Route 124
- Pennsylvania Route 124
- South Carolina Highway 124
- Tennessee State Route 124
- Texas State Highway 124
- Texas State Highway Loop 124
- Farm to Market Road 124
- Utah State Route 124
- Virginia State Route 124
- Virginia State Route 124 (1924-1926) (former)
- Virginia State Route 124 (1928-1932) (former)
- Virginia State Route 124 (1933-1937) (former)
- Virginia State Route 124 (1937-1943) (former)
- Washington State Route 124
- Wisconsin Highway 124

Territories

- Puerto Rico Highway 124

Preceded by 123	Lists of highways 124	Succeeded by 125
