= List of highways numbered 123 =

The following highways are numbered 123:

== Australia ==
- Now Newcastle Inner City Bypass

== Brazil ==
- SP-123 (Rodovia Floriano Rodrigues Pinheiro)

== Canada ==
- New Brunswick Route 123
- Ontario Highway 123 (former)
- Prince Edward Island Route 123
- Saskatchewan Highway 123

== Costa Rica ==
- National Route 123

== Cuba ==
- 4–123
- 5–123
- Las Tunas–Baracoa Road

== India ==
- National Highway 123 (India) (NH 123) in the states of Rajasthan and Uttar Pradesh

== Japan ==
- Japan National Route 123

== Malaysia ==
- Malaysia Federal Route 123 (Jalan Rasau Kerteh Selatan), Terengganu, Malaysia

== Mexico ==
- Mexican Federal Highway 123 (Carretera Federal 123)

== Nigeria ==
- A123 highway (Nigeria)

== Spain ==
- N-123 road (Spain)

== United Kingdom ==
- A123 road

== United States ==
- U.S. Route 123
  - U.S. Route 123 (Kentucky) (former)
- Alabama State Route 123
  - County Route 123 (Lee County, Alabama)
- Arkansas Highway 123
- California State Route 123
- Connecticut Route 123
- Florida State Road 123
  - County Road 123 (Baker County, Florida)
- Georgia State Route 123
- Hawaii Route 123 (former)
- Illinois Route 123
- Indiana State Road 123 (former)
- Iowa Highway 123 (former)
- K-123 (Kansas highway)
- Kentucky Route 123
- Louisiana Highway 123
- Maine State Route 123
- Maryland Route 123 (former)
- Massachusetts Route 123
- M-123 (Michigan highway)
- Minnesota State Highway 123
- Missouri Route 123
- New Hampshire Route 123
  - New Hampshire Route 123A
- County Route 123 (Bergen County, New Jersey)
- New York State Route 123
  - County Route 123 (Jefferson County, New York)
  - County Route 123 (Niagara County, New York)
- North Carolina Highway 123
- Ohio State Route 123
- Oklahoma State Highway 123
- Pennsylvania Route 123 (former)
- Rhode Island Route 123
- South Dakota Highway 123
- Tennessee State Route 123
- Texas State Highway 123
  - Texas State Highway Loop 123
  - Farm to Market Road 123
- Utah State Route 123
- Vermont Route 123
- Virginia State Route 123
  - Virginia State Route 123 (1923-1928) (former)
  - Virginia State Route 123 (1928-1933) (former)
  - Virginia State Route 123 (1933-1940) (former)
- Washington State Route 123
- West Virginia Route 123
- Wisconsin Highway 123

Territories

- Puerto Rico Highway 123

Preceded by 122	Lists of highways 123	Succeeded by 124
