= List of highways numbered 127 =

Route 127 or Highway 127 can refer to multiple roads:

== Canada ==
- New Brunswick Route 127
- Ontario Highway 127
- Prince Edward Island Route 127

== Costa Rica ==
- National Route 127

== India ==
- National Highway 127 (India)

== Japan ==
- Japan National Route 127

== Philippines ==
- N127 highway (Philippines)

== United Kingdom ==
- A127 road
- B127 road

== United States ==
- U.S. Route 127
- Alabama State Route 127
  - County Route 127 (Lee County, Alabama)
- Arkansas Highway 127
- California State Route 127
- Colorado State Highway 127
- Connecticut Route 127
- Florida State Road 127 (former)
  - County Road 127 (Baker County, Florida)
- Georgia State Route 127
- Illinois Route 127
  - Illinois Route 127A (former)
- Indiana State Road 127
- Iowa Highway 127
- K-127 (Kansas highway) (former)
- Louisiana Highway 127
- Maine State Route 127
- Maryland Route 127 (former)
- Massachusetts Route 127
  - Massachusetts Route 127A
- Minnesota State Highway 127 (former)
- Missouri Route 127
- New Hampshire Route 127
- County Route 127 (Bergen County, New Jersey)
- New Mexico State Road 127
- New York State Route 127
  - County Route 127 (Cortland County, New York)
    - County Route 127A (Cortland County, New York)
  - County Route 127 (Erie County, New York)
  - County Route 127 (Herkimer County, New York)
  - County Route 127 (Monroe County, New York)
  - County Route 127 (Montgomery County, New York)
  - County Route 127 (Onondaga County, New York)
  - County Route 127 (Steuben County, New York)
  - County Route 127 (Tompkins County, New York)
  - County Route 127 (Westchester County, New York)
- North Carolina Highway 127
- North Dakota Highway 127
- Ohio State Route 127 (1923-1927) (former)
- Oklahoma State Highway 127
- Pennsylvania Route 127
- South Carolina Highway 127
- South Dakota Highway 127
- Tennessee State Route 127
- Texas State Highway 127
  - Texas State Highway Loop 127
  - Farm to Market Road 127
- Utah State Route 127
- Vermont Route 127
- Virginia State Route 127
  - Virginia State Route 127 (1928-1933) (former)
  - Virginia State Route 127 (1933-1948) (former)
- Washington State Route 127
- West Virginia Route 127
- Wisconsin Highway 127

Territories

- Puerto Rico Highway 127

Preceded by 126	Lists of highways 127	Succeeded by 128
