= Indiana State Road 526 =

Former state highway in Indiana, United States

State Road 526
- Former SR 526 highlighted in red

Route information
- Maintained by INDOT
- Length: 1.61 mi (2.59 km)

Major junctions
- South end: Purdue University Airport in West Lafayette
- North end: SR 126 in West Lafayette

Location
- Country: United States
- State: Indiana
- Counties: Tippecanoe

Highway system
- Indiana State Highway System; Interstate; US; State; Scenic
← SR 524	→ SR 545

State Road 526 was a short north–south highway connecting the Purdue University Airport with State Road 126 in West Lafayette.

== Route description ==
State Road 526 ran along the approximate western boundary of the Purdue University campus. It was a child of, and intersected with, State Road 26. It began at the airport and ran north to State Street, the former SR 26. Continuing north, it was concurrent with McCormick Road; it passed Third Street, then veered to the northwest and terminated at State Road 126, which is also Cherry Lane. McCormick Road continues along the same line.

In conjunction with the 2013 bypass of Lafayette/West Lafayette carrying US 231, the SR 526 designation was removed.

== Major intersections ==
The entire route is in West Lafayette, Tippecanoe County.

mi	km	Destinations	Notes
0.00	0.00	Purdue University Airport	Southern terminus of SR 526
0.52	0.84	SR 26 – Lafayette	
1.61	2.59	SR 126 east	Northern terminus of SR 526
1.000 mi = 1.609 km; 1.000 km = 0.621 mi
