= Martha E. Sewall Curtis =

American suffragist and writer

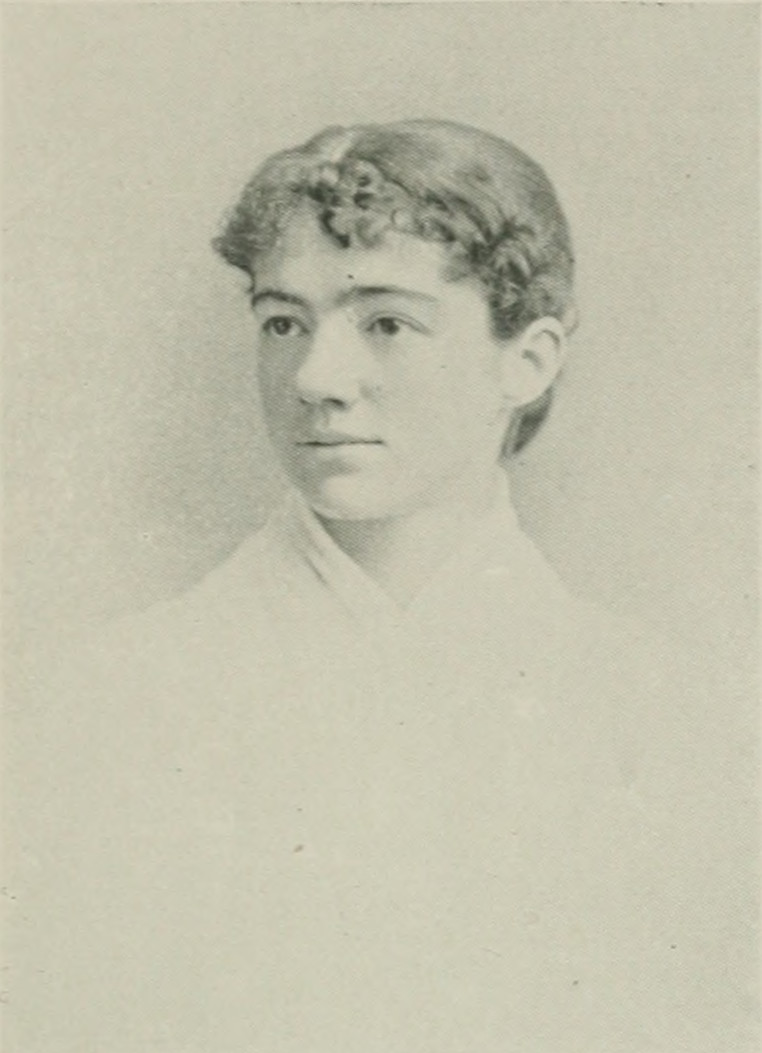
- Photo in A Woman of the Century
- Born: Martha Elizabeth Sewall; May 18, 1858; Burlington, Massachusetts, U.S.
- Died: April 27, 1915 (aged 56); Burlington, Massachusetts, U.S.
- Occupations: suffragist; writer; businesswoman
- Spouse: Thomas S. Curtis (m. 1879; died 1888)
- Children: 2
- Relatives: Henry Dunster
- Writing career
- Language: English
- Genre: historical research

Martha E. Sewall Curtis (May 18, 1858 – April 27, 1915) was an American woman suffragist and writer. She delivered notable lectures at the meetings of the National Woman Suffrage Association in Boston. For years, she edited a weekly woman's column in the News, of Woburn, Massachusetts, and was president of the Woburn Equal Suffrage League. For a number of years, she conducted in Boston a bureau of stenography and employed about 20 women. Her publications included Burlington Church (1885), Burlington (1890), and Ye olde meeting house (1909).

== Early years and education ==
Martha Elizabeth Sewall was born in Burlington, Massachusetts, May 18, 1858. She was descended from one of the oldest families of New England. Her parents were Samuel Sewall and Elizabeth Brown Sewall. For many years, her father served as Town Clerk at Burlington. Her paternal grandfather, Rev. Samuel Sewall, minister of the Old South Church, and author of the history of Woburn. Her great-grandfather was Judge Sewall, Massachusetts Supreme Judicial Court Chief Justice, who was affiliated with the Salem witch trials. On her grandmother's side, she was descended from Henry Dunster, first president of Harvard College. She was graduated from Cambridge high school in 1874, the youngest of her class. She subsequently pursued the study of various literary branches and accomplishments.

== Career ==
For several years, she was a teacher, and at one time was on the school committee of her native town. She married Thomas S. Curtis, July 3, 1879. They had two children, both of whom died in infancy. Her husband died December 27, 1888. He fully sympathized with his wife in her literary and reformatory work.

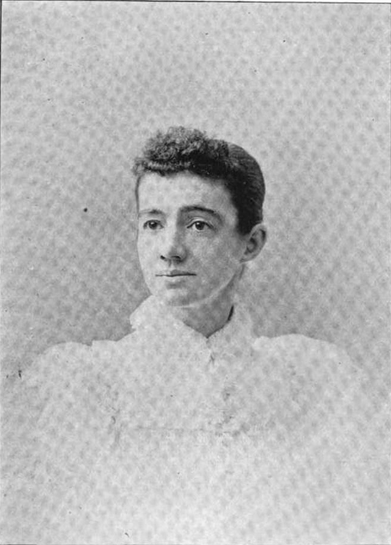
Martha E. Sewall Curtis

After her marriage, she took a full course in elocution at the New England Conservatory and was graduated in 1883. She afterward spent a year in the study of oratory to fit herself for public speaking. A firm believer in the equality of the sexes, she began when quite young to work for the enfranchisement of women. Her first appearance as a public lecturer was in the meetings of the National Woman Suffrage Association in Boston and elsewhere. In 1889, she was appointed State lecturer of the Massachusetts Woman Suffrage Association, and in that capacity addressed many public meetings in different parts of the State. She served as president of the Woburn Equal Suffrage League. She has been active in urging women to vote for the school committee, the only form of suffrage granted to them in Massachusetts. She was a thorough believer in temperance, but held that the best way to obtain good laws was to put the ballot into the hands of women as well as men.

She also did much work for the reform by contributing articles to the newspapers. She edited a weekly woman's column in the Woburn News. From her grandfather. Rev. Samuel Sewall, an antiquarian, she inherited a taste for historical research. She wrote a history of her own town for the History of Middlesex County. For a number of years, she conducted in Boston a bureau of stenography and employed about 20 women.

== Personal life ==
During the period of 1880 to 1885, she served as organist of the Burlington church. She died April 27, 1915, at her home in Burlington.

== Selected works ==
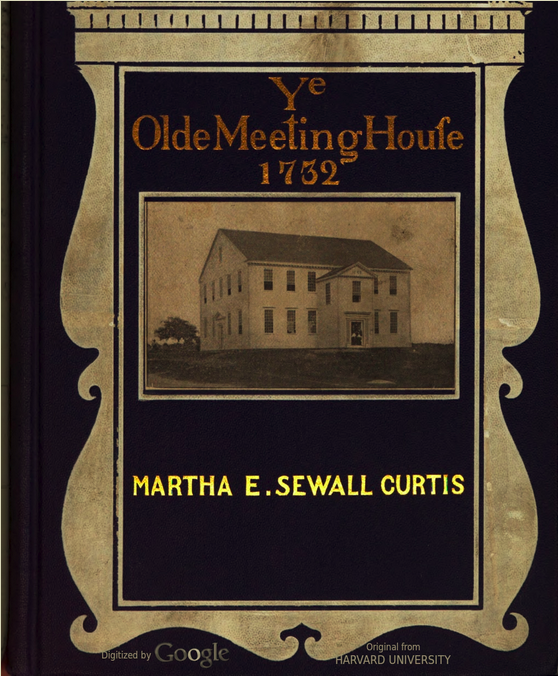
Ye old meeting house (1909)

- Burlington Church. 150th anniversary. Burlington, Mass., 1885
- Burlington, 1890
- Ye olde meeting house : addresses and verses relating to the meeting house, Burlington, Middlesex County, Massachusetts, built 1732, and other historical addresses, 1909 (Text)

== See also ==
- Meeting House of the Second Parish in Woburn
