= D117 road =

Road in Croatia

D117 state road

Route information
- Length: 20.2 km (12.6 mi)

Major junctions
- From: Vis ferry port
- To: Komiža

Location
- Country: Croatia
- Counties: Split-Dalmatia
- Major cities: Vis, Komiža

Highway system
- Highways in Croatia

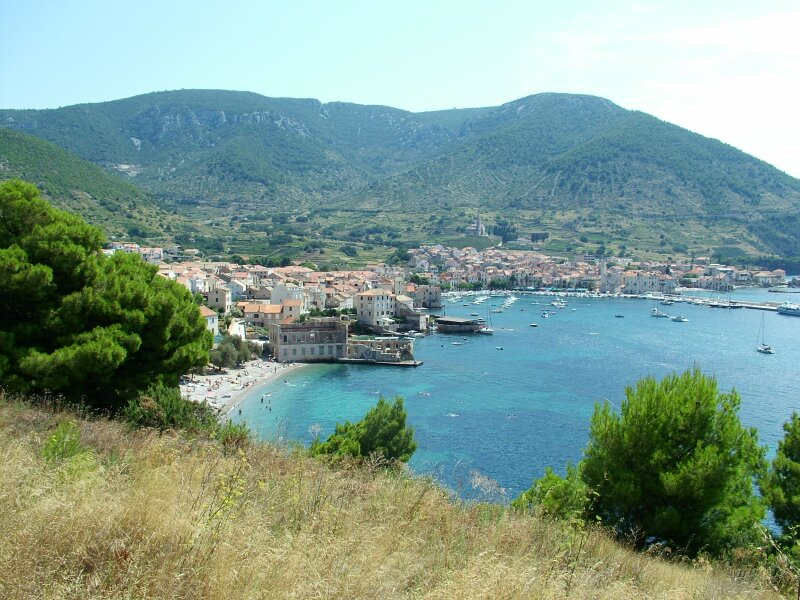
Komiža, at the western terminus of the D117

D117 is a state road on Vis Island in Croatia connecting the town of Komiža to the Vis ferry port, from where Jadrolinija ferries fly to the mainland, docking in Split and the D410 state road The road is 20.2 km (12.6 mi) long.

The road, as well as all other state roads in Croatia, is managed and maintained by Hrvatske ceste, a state-owned company.

== Traffic volume ==
Traffic is regularly measured and reported by Hrvatske ceste (HC), operator of the road. Substantial variations between annual (AADT) and summer (ASDT) traffic volumes are attributed to the fact that the road connects a number of island resorts.

D117 traffic volume
Road	Counting site	AADT	ASDT	Notes
D117	5801 Vis	344	987	Adjacent to the Ž67212 junction.

== Road junctions and populated areas ==
D117 junctions/populated areas
Type	Slip roads/Notes
	Vis ferry port – access to the mainland port of Split (by Jadrolinija) and the D410 to the D8 state road and the A1 motorway Dugopolje interchange. The eastern terminus of the road.
	Vis; Ž6212 to Komiža. L67212 to Češka vila.
	Plisko Polje
	Podšpilje
	Podhum
	Komiža; Ž6212 to Vis. The western terminus of the road.
