= California State Route 117 =

Two (post-1964) highways in the U.S. state of California have been designated Route 117:

- California State Route 117 (1964–1965), Junipero Serra Boulevard in the San Francisco Bay Area
- California State Route 117 (1972–1986), Otay Mesa Road near San Diego (now SR 905)
