= M-122 (Michigan highway) =

Former state highway in Mackinac County, Michigan, United States

M-122
- M-122 highlighted in red

Route information
- Maintained by MDOT
- Length: 1.068 mi (1.719 km)
- Existed: 1929–1957

Major junctions
- West end: US 2 in St. Ignace
- East end: State Ferry Docks in St. Ignace

Location
- Country: United States
- State: Michigan
- Counties: Mackinac

Highway system
- Michigan State Trunkline Highway System; Interstate; US; State; Byways
| ← M-121 | → M-123 |

M-122 was a state trunkline highway in the US state of Michigan entirely in the city of St. Ignace. The highway connected US Highway 2 (US 2) to the State Highway Ferry Dock used before the Mackinac Bridge was built. It was retired and the road returned to local control in 1957.

== Route description ==
Prior to the opening of the Mackinac Bridge, travelers wishing to venture from St. Ignace to Mackinaw City had to do so via ferry. M-122 began at US 2 (now Business Loop Interstate 75) near Straits State Park and traveled through town along Ferry Road where it ran southeasterly from the main highway. East of Hornbach Street M-122 curved around to the east near Paro Street. The highway ended at the State Ferry Docks on the southeast side of the city next to the Coast Guard station.

== History ==
M-122 was initially assumed into the state highway system in 1929 as a connector between US 31 and Straits State Park. In 1936, US 2 was routed into St. Ignace and US 31 was scaled back to end in the Lower Peninsula in Mackinaw City. M-122 now provided a connection between US 2 and the new docks on the southeast side of the city. It existed in this capacity until 1957 when the Mackinac Bridge opened to traffic.

== Major intersections ==
The entire highway was in St. Ignace, Mackinac County.

| mi | km | Destinations | Notes |
|---|---|---|---|
| 0.000 | 0.000 | US 2 | Prior to 1936 the road terminated at US 31 which is currently BL I-75 |
| 1.068 | 1.719 | State Ferry Docks | |
1.000 mi = 1.609 km; 1.000 km = 0.621 mi
