= Indiana State Road 126 =

State highway in Indiana, United States

State Road 126
- Cherry Lane
- Former SR 126 highlighted in red

Route information
- Maintained by INDOT
- Length: 1.09 mi (1.75 km)
- Existed: 1957–September 13, 2013

Major junctions
- West end: SR 526 in West Lafayette
- East end: US 231 in West Lafayette

Location
- Country: United States
- State: Indiana
- Counties: Tippecanoe

Highway system
- Indiana State Highway System; Interstate; US; State; Scenic
← SR 124	→ SR 127

State Road 126 in the U.S. State of Indiana was a short east–west highway connecting former State Road 526 (McCormick Road) with the former alignment of U.S. Route 231 (Northwestern Avenue) in West Lafayette.

== Route description ==
State Road 126 formed the northern boundary of the Purdue University campus. It was a child of, and ran parallel to, State Road 26 which was about a mile to the south. It was concurrent with Cherry Lane and passed just to the north of Ross–Ade Stadium before terminating at Northwestern Avenue. It was decommissioned on 9/13/13.

== Major intersections ==
The entire route is in West Lafayette, Tippecanoe County.

mi	km	Destinations	Notes
0.00	0.00	SR 526	Western terminus of SR 126
1.09	1.75	US 231	Eastern terminus of SR 126
1.000 mi = 1.609 km; 1.000 km = 0.621 mi
