= M-121 (Michigan highway) =

State highway in Ottawa and Kent counties in Michigan, United States

M-121
- Chicago Drive
- M-121 highlighted in red

Route information
- Maintained by MDOT
- Length: 12.763 mi (20.540 km)
- Existed: 2007–present

Major junctions
- West end: Chicago Drive and Main Street in Zeeland
- East end: I-196 in Grandville

Location
- Country: United States
- State: Michigan
- Counties: Ottawa, Kent

Highway system
- Michigan State Trunkline Highway System; Interstate; US; State; Byways
← M-120	→ M-122

M-121 is a state trunkline highway in West Michigan. The highway follows Chicago Drive, a local roadway, from Zeeland to Grandville. Chicago Drive itself runs past the M-121 segment on either side from Holland to Wyoming. The roadway passes through rural farmland on a route that runs parallel to Interstate 196 (I-196). M-121 forms the main street through the center of Hudsonville as it runs southwest–northeast. It forms a major street through the unincorporated community of Jenison before M-121 terminates at I-196 in Grandville.

The M-121 designation has been used twice before in the state. The first was for a former routing of US Highway 2 (US 2), and the second was for a connection between I-69, I-75/US 23 and Bishop International Airport in the Flint area. Since 2007, M-121 has been used for a portion of the former M-21 in Ottawa County, which was formerly designated as state-maintained "Old M-21". Future plans will reconfigure a section of the current highway from four lanes divided to four lanes undivided.

== Route description ==
Chicago Drive, largely signed as M-121, is a combination state trunkline highway and municipal street running from 8th Street in Holland to the intersection of Cesar E Chavez (formerly known as Grandville) and Clyde Park avenues at the border of Grand Rapids and Wyoming, approximately 23.5 miles (37.8 km) in length. Running eastward, Chicago Drive picks up the Business Loop I-196 designation east of US 31. The highway has the typical mix of industry and commercial properties for the area. At 112th Avenue, it turns northeasterly to run through Zeeland. The roadway changes names when it turns due east again, where it is named Main Avenue and Main Place, comprising the only section of the route not designated Chicago Drive.

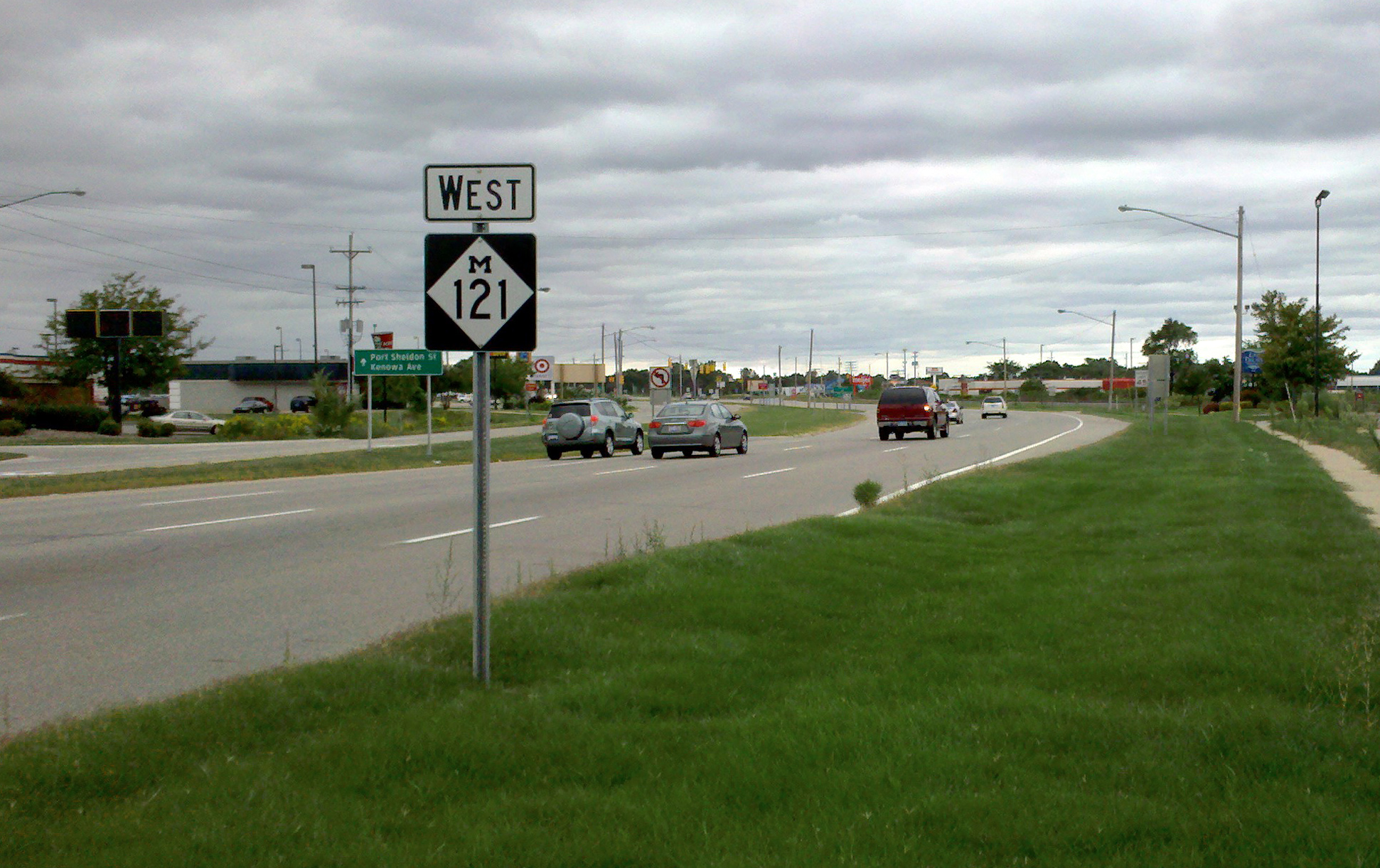
M-121 runs through Jenison's business district

Starting at the corner of Main Street and Chicago Drive, M-121 runs northeasterly out of Zeeland on Chicago Drive roughly parallel to I-196. A CSX railroad line also parallels the road to the northwest. The trunkline is a four-lane divided highway bordered by farms. Passing the Hudsonville Fair Grounds, Chicago Drive enters Hudsonville as the main street downtown. The highway continues to the northeast out of town through suburban residential areas to Jenison, where once again Chicago Drive is bordered by commercial properties. Through this area, the roadway is divided, utilizing Michigan lefts. The M-121 designation ends at the interchange with I-196 just across the Kent County line in Grandville.

The corridor from I-196 to its end in Grand Rapids is lined with businesses and few houses. The intersection of Chicago Drive and Wilson Avenue is in downtown Grandville. In Wyoming from north of M-11 (28th Street) to Burlingame Avenue, Chicago Drive run through a mostly industrial area with few commercial properties. Northeast of about Byron Center Avenue, Chicago Drive carries Business Spur I-196 (BS I-196). At the corner with Cesar E Chavez (formerly known as Grandville) and Clyde Park avenues, Chicago Drive and BS I-196 ends.

M-121 is maintained by the Michigan Department of Transportation (MDOT) like other state highways in Michigan. As a part of these maintenance responsibilities, the department tracks the volume of traffic that uses the roadways under its jurisdiction. These volumes are expressed using a metric called annual average daily traffic, which is a statistical calculation of the average daily number of vehicles on a segment of roadway. MDOT's surveys in 2010 showed that the lowest traffic levels along M-121 were the 10,103 vehicles daily at the western terminus in Zeeland; the highest counts were the 20,140 vehicles per day at the eastern terminus. None of M-121 has been listed on the National Highway System, a network of roads important to the country's economy, defense, and mobility.

== History ==
There have been three roadways to carry the M-121 designation in Michigan.

=== Previous routings ===
M-121 was also used as the designation along two other roadways. In 1933, it was used for a former routing of US 2 in the Upper Peninsula. In 1935, this route was redesignated as a portion of a new M-5 and the M-121 designation was transferred to Bristol Road in Flint. This Flint-area trunkline provided access to Bishop International Airport from both of the I-69 and I-75/US 23 freeways until it was retired in 2003. At that time, Bristol Road was returned to local control.

=== Current routing ===
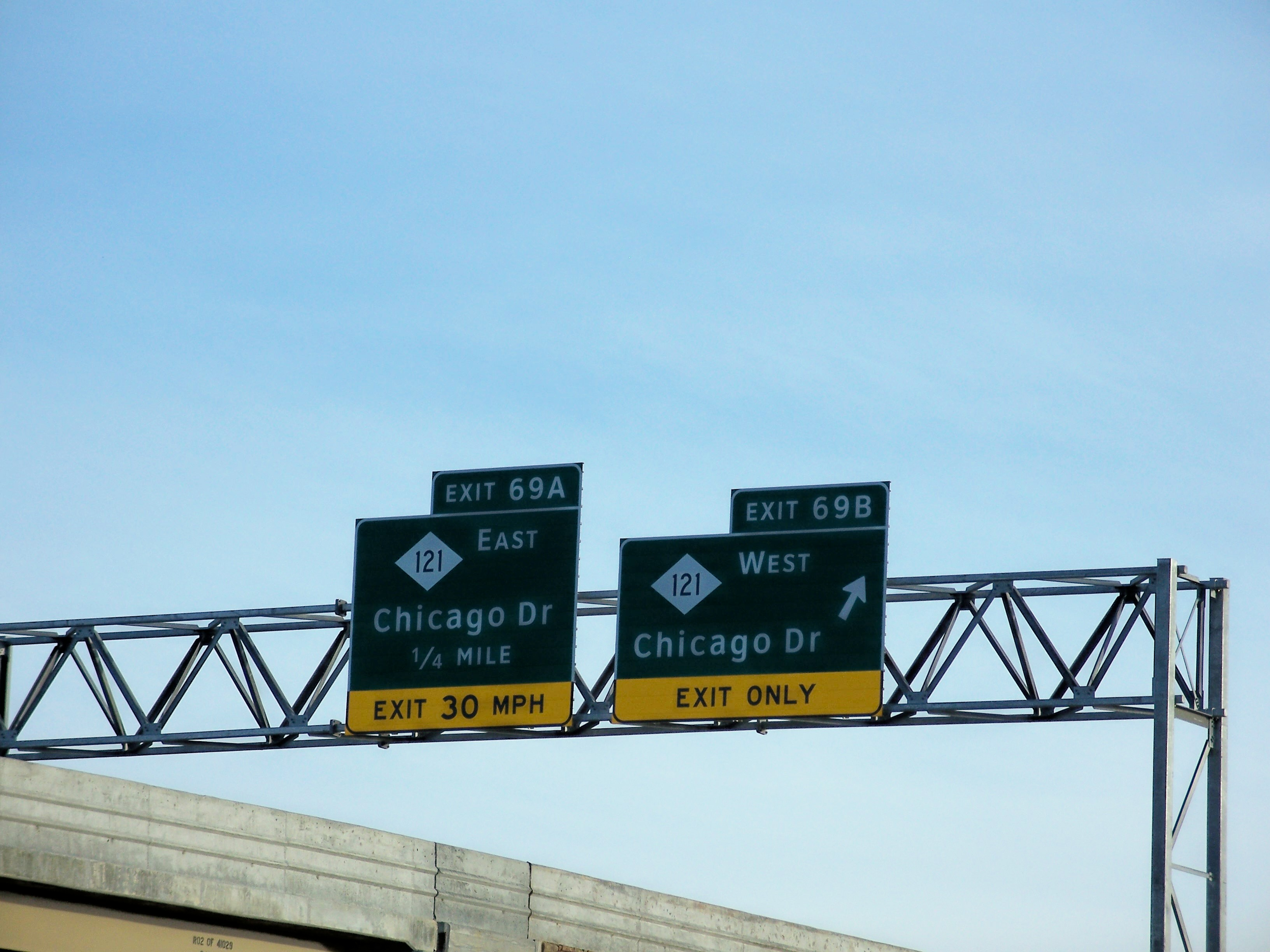
M-121's exit off I-196 in Grandville; note that the sign for exit 69A incorrectly implies an eastward continuation of M-121

From 1919 to 1926, the current highway known as M-121 was designated M-51. Then until 1974, the trunkline was part of M-21; that designation was removed when I-196 was completed between those Zeeland and Grandville, and much of the route became an unsigned state trunkline designated Old M-21, although it is locally referred to by its given name, Chicago Drive. The portion of Chicago Drive now signed as M-121 is 12.763 miles (20.540 km) long; it was given its designation in late 2007.

== Future ==
Portions of the four-lane divided surface access highway along M-121 will become four-lane undivided as the westbound lanes are shifted south away from unstable soil and parallel train tracks.

== Major intersections ==
County	Location	mi	km	Destinations	Notes
Ottawa	Zeeland	0.000	0.000	Main Street	
Kent	Grandville	12.763	20.540	I-196	Designation ends just east of the Ottawa–Kent county line
1.000 mi = 1.609 km; 1.000 km = 0.621 mi
