= List of highways numbered 128 =

The following highways are numbered 128:

== Canada ==
- New Brunswick Route 128
- Ontario Highway 128 (former)
- Prince Edward Island Route 128

== Costa Rica ==
- National Route 128

== India ==
- National Highway 128 (India)

== Japan ==
- Japan National Route 128

== United Kingdom ==
- A128 road

== United States ==
- U.S. Route 128 (former proposal)
- Alabama State Route 128
  - County Route 128 (Lee County, Alabama)
- Arkansas Highway 128
- California State Route 128
- Colorado State Highway 128
- Connecticut Route 128
- Florida State Road 128
- Georgia State Route 128
- Illinois Route 128
- Indiana State Road 128
- Iowa Highway 128
- K-128 (Kansas highway)
- Kentucky Route 128
- Louisiana Highway 128
- Maine State Route 128
- Maryland Route 128
- Massachusetts Route 128
  - Massachusetts Route 128A (former)
- Missouri Route 128
- Nebraska Highway 128
- New Hampshire Route 128
- New Mexico State Road 128
- New York State Route 128
  - County Route 128 (Cortland County, New York)
  - County Route 128 (Jefferson County, New York)
  - County Route 128 (Rensselaer County, New York)
  - County Route 128 (Sullivan County, New York)
  - County Route 128 (Tompkins County, New York)
  - County Route 128 (Ulster County, New York)
- North Carolina Highway 128
- Ohio State Route 128
- Oklahoma State Highway 128
- Pennsylvania Route 128
- Rhode Island Route 128
- South Carolina Highway 128
- Tennessee State Route 128
- Texas State Highway 128
  - Texas State Highway Loop 128
  - Texas State Highway Spur 128 (former)
  - Farm to Market Road 128
- Utah State Route 128
- Vermont Route 128
- Virginia State Route 128
  - Virginia State Route 128 (1928-1933) (former)
- Washington State Route 128
- Wisconsin Highway 128

Territories

- Puerto Rico Highway 128

Preceded by 127	Lists of highways 128	Succeeded by 129
