= List of highways numbered 120 =

Route 120 or Highway 120 can refer to multiple highways:

== Argentina ==
- National Route 120

== Australia ==
- Hopkins Highway

== Brazil ==
- BR-120

== Canada ==
- New Brunswick Route 120
- Prince Edward Island Route 120
- Saskatchewan Highway 120

== Costa Rica ==
- National Route 120

== Finland ==
- National Highway 120 (Finland)

== India ==
- National Highway 120 (India)

== Japan ==
- Japan National Route 120

== Korea, South ==
- Gyeongin Expressway

== Mexico ==
- Mexican Federal Highway 120

== United Kingdom ==
- A120 road
- B120 road

== United States ==
- Interstate 120 (former proposal)
- U.S. Route 120 (former)
- Alabama State Route 120
  - County Route 120 (Lee County, Alabama)
- Arkansas Highway 120
- California State Route 120
- Colorado State Highway 120
- Connecticut Route 120
- Florida State Road 120
  - County Road 120 (Alachua County, Florida)
  - County Road 120 (Baker County, Florida)
  - County Road 120 (Levy County, Florida)
  - County Road 120 (Liberty County, Florida)
- Georgia State Route 120
- Hawaii Route 120 (former)
- Illinois Route 120
- Indiana State Road 120
- K-120 (Kansas highway)
- Kentucky Route 120
- Louisiana Highway 120
- Maine State Route 120
- Maryland Route 120 (former)
- Massachusetts Route 120
- M-120 (Michigan highway)
- Minnesota State Highway 120
- Missouri Route 120
- Nevada State Route 120
- New Hampshire Route 120
- New Jersey Route 120
  - County Route 120 (Bergen County, New Jersey)
- New Mexico State Road 120
- New York State Route 120
  - New York State Route 120A
  - County Route 120 (Cortland County, New York)
  - County Route 120 (Herkimer County, New York)
  - County Route 120 (Jefferson County, New York)
  - County Route 120 (Monroe County, New York)
  - County Route 120 (Montgomery County, New York)
  - County Route 120 (Niagara County, New York)
  - County Route 120 (Rensselaer County, New York)
  - County Route 120 (Seneca County, New York)
  - County Route 120 (Steuben County, New York)
  - County Route 120 (Wayne County, New York)
- North Carolina Highway 120
- Ohio State Route 120
- Oklahoma State Highway 120
- Oregon Route 120
- Pennsylvania Route 120
- Rhode Island Route 120
- South Carolina Highway 120
- Tennessee State Route 120
- Texas State Highway 120 (former)
  - Texas State Highway Loop 120
  - Farm to Market Road 120
- Utah State Route 120
- Vermont Route 120
- Virginia State Route 120
  - Virginia State Route 120 (1928-1933) (former)
  - Virginia State Route 120 (1933-1940) (former)
- Washington State Route 120 (former)
- Wisconsin Highway 120
- Wyoming Highway 120

Territories

- Puerto Rico Highway 120

Preceded by 119	Lists of highways 120	Succeeded by 121
