= Vis (town) =

Town in Split-Dalmatia, Croatia

- Town
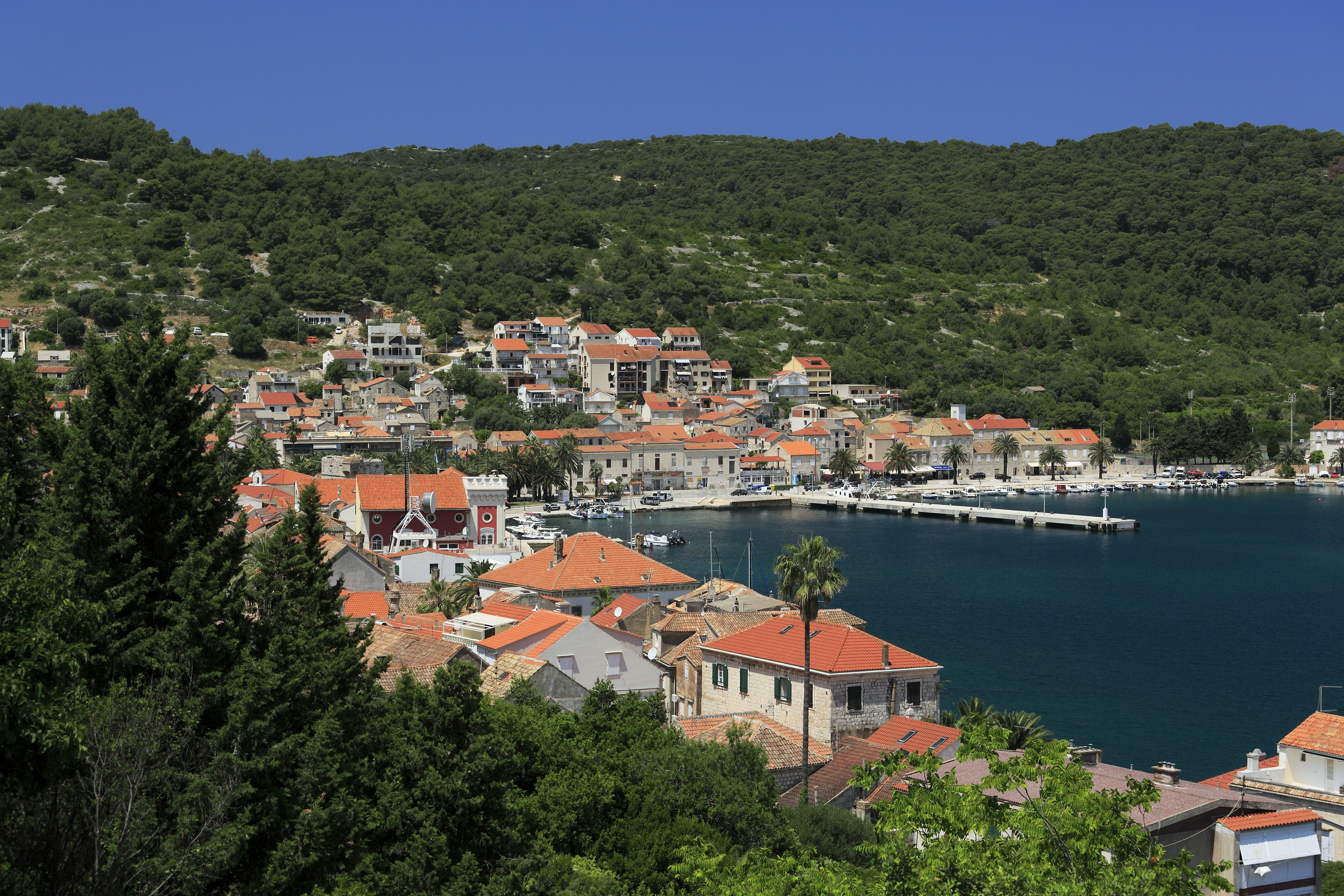
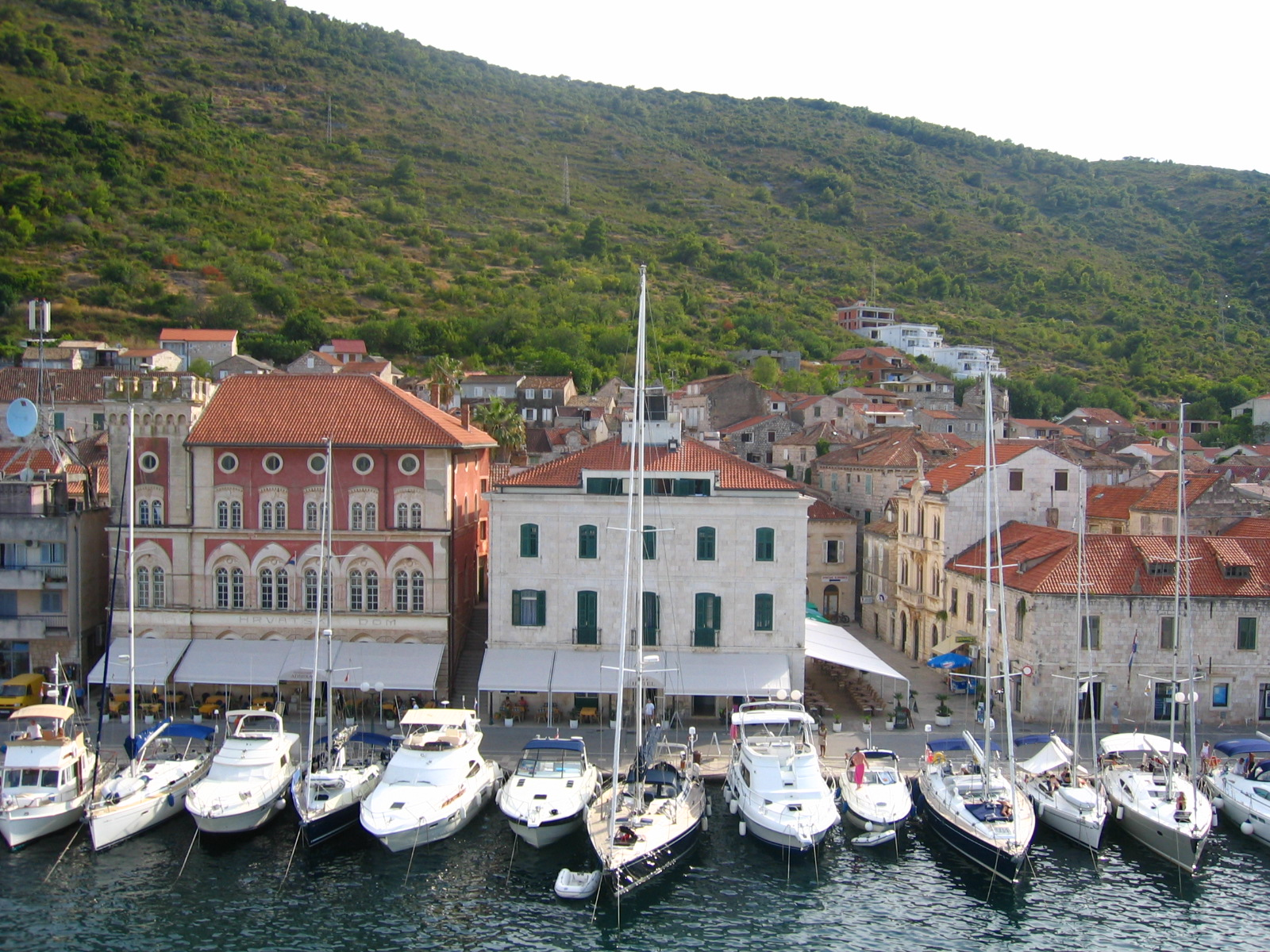
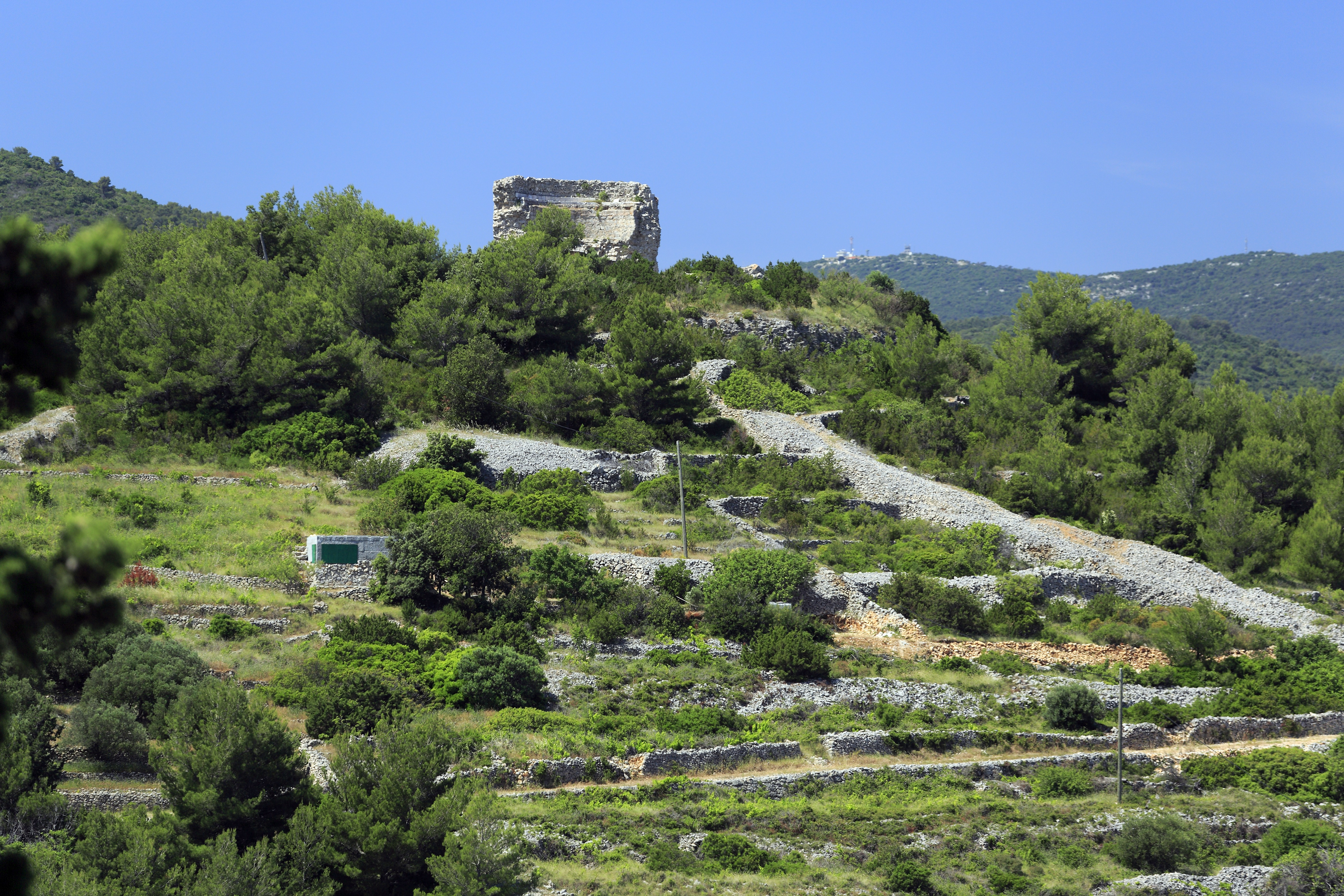
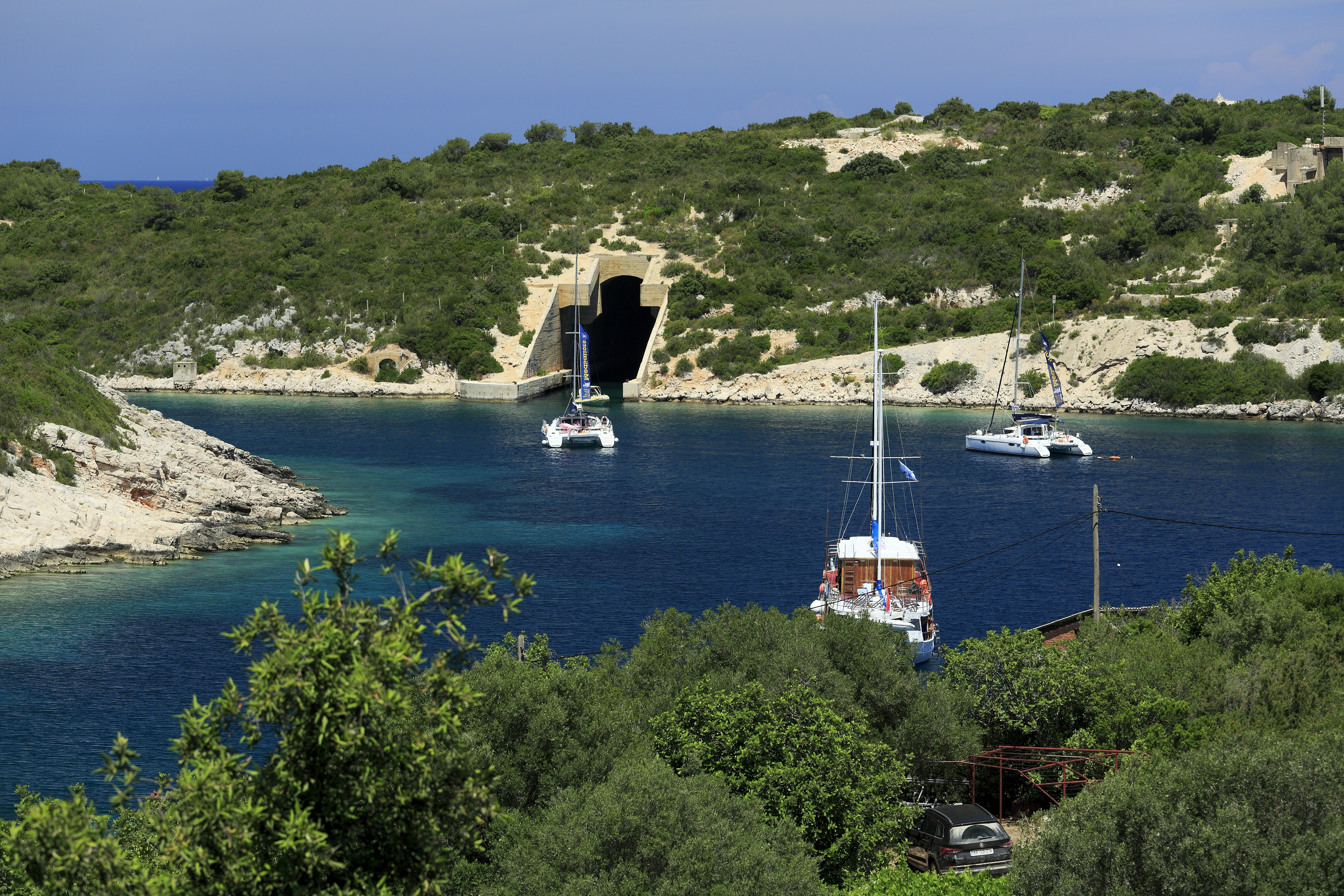
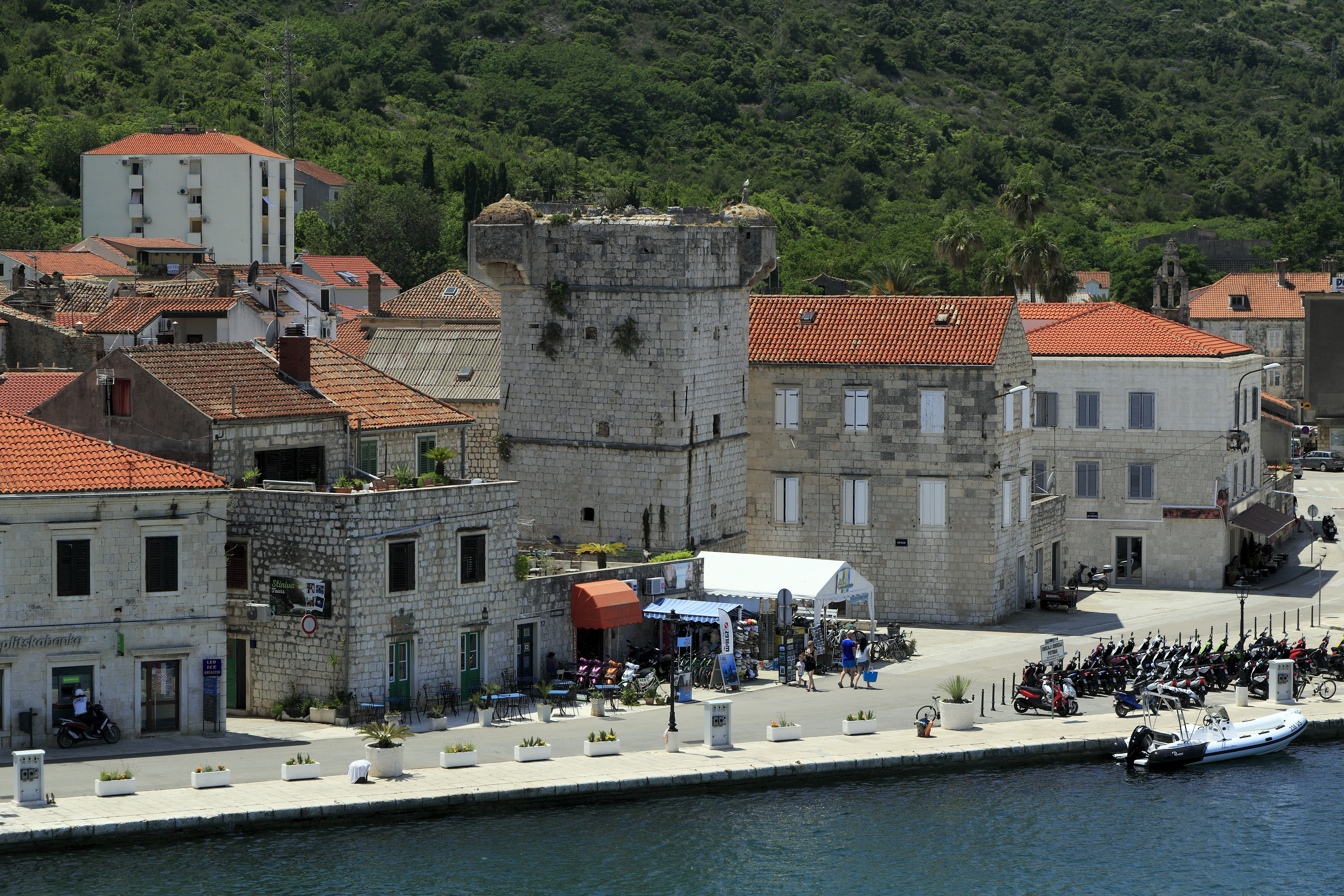
- Views of Vis

- Location of Vis in Croatia
- Coordinates: 43°03′N 16°11′E
- Country: Croatia
- Region: Dalmatia
- County: Split-Dalmatia County
- Island: Vis

Government
  - Mayor: Ivo Radica (HDZ)

Area
  - Town: 52.8 km^{2} (20.4 sq mi)
  - Urban: 27.0 km^{2} (10.4 sq mi)
- Elevation: 0 m (0 ft)

Population (2021)
  - Town: 1,918
  - Density: 36.3/km^{2} (94.1/sq mi)
  - Urban: 1,582
  - Urban density: 58.6/km^{2} (152/sq mi)
- Time zone: UTC+1 (CET)
  - Summer (DST): UTC+2 (CEST)
- Postal code: 21480
- Area code: 021
- Website: gradvis.hr

Vis is a town on the eponymous island in the Adriatic Sea in southern Croatia. Its population was 1,934 as of 2011. The town is the seat of the eponymous Vis municipality, one of the island's two municipalities (the other being Komiža). Both belong administratively to Split-Dalmatia County.

== History ==
Vis, on the Illyrian coast, was established in the 4th century BCE as an Ancient Greek polis Issa, a colony of Syracuse, Sicily (which in turn was a colony of Corinth). Dionysius the Elder, the contemporary tyrant of Syracuse, founded the colony Issa to control shipping in the Adriatic Sea. Ancient Issa developed as the urban and economic center of the Dalmatian coasts, and it also served as a military base. The city established several colonies, such as Aspálathos, modern-day Split (now the largest city in Dalmatia), Epidauros (Cavtat), and Tragurion (Trogir). Issa functioned as an independent polis until the 1st century BCE, when it was conquered by the Roman Empire. Following the Roman conquest, Issa lost its significance until the late Middle Ages, when it was mentioned in several historical sources.

Until 1797, the island was under the rule of the Republic of Venice. Administratively, the island of Lissa was for centuries bound to the island of Lesina, now named Hvar. Under the Treaty of Pressburg, control of the Dalmatian coast and islands passed to the short-lived Napoleonic Kingdom of Italy, with Italian the official language on the island. From 1809 until the end of the Napoleonic Wars the town was occupied by Britain, then ceded to the Austrian Empire from 1815. It maintained its Italian name of Lissa. After the end of World War I, it was under Italian rule again in the period from 1918 to 1921, according to the provisions of the 1915 Treaty of London, before it was ceded to Kingdom of Yugoslavia as part of the 1920 Treaty of Rapallo. Vis was the site of the general headquarters of Marshal Josip Broz Tito, the leader of the Yugoslav Partisan resistance movement during World War II. After the war, the Yugoslav People's Army used the island as one of its main naval bases until abandoning the base in 1989.

== Geography ==
The town of Vis is in a relatively large and protected bay (Croatian: Uvala Svetog Jurja, English: Bay of Saint George) on the island's northeast side, facing the island of Hvar and the Dalmatian mainland. The port of Vis is in the southwest part of the bay. The port is protected from the open sea's influence by the islet Host (named after William Hoste) and the peninsula Prirovo (sometimes spelled "Prilovo"). Other, smaller ports are in Kut and Stonca, which are also parts of the town of Vis.

Vis is separated from its hinterlands (Dračevo polje and Velo polje) by 250–300 m high hills which are important for local residents as the main source of income from viticulture. Other official parts of the town are villages on the bays of the south and southeast coast, such as Milna, Rukavac, Srebrna, Stiniva, Stončica, some of which show signs of developing into new towns. Besides Vis itself, these bays and villages are the island's main source of tourist income.

== Climate ==
Vis experiences warm and temperate winters with warm to hot summers. The landward breeze makes it the most moderate climate in Croatia. The climate allows for tropical and Mediterranean vegetation, including palms, carobs, olives, grapes and lemons. The average rainfall is about 750 mm (29.5 in). The island of Vis has a number of natural sources of drinking water from natural spring water reservoirs. It is also home to 12 distinct types of island vegetation. The World Organization for Environmental Protection has named Vis one of the 10 environmentally best-preserved islands in the Mediterranean.

== Administration ==
The official area of the town of Vis is the entire eastern half of the island. The western half is under the authority of Komiža.

The town council consists of eleven councilors divided into three groups; five from the SDP - HNS - HSS coalition, three from the Independent List of Ante Acalinović and three from the HDZ - HSP coalition. Ascendancy is currently held by HDZ - HSP coalition in alliance with the Independent List. The current city major is Ivo Radica.

== Population ==
In the 2011 census, the Vis municipality was composed of the following settlements:

- Dračevo Polje, population 13
- Marinje Zemlje, population 63
- Milna, population 30
- Plisko Polje, population 19
- Podselje, population 19
- Podstražje, population 40
- Rogačić, population 12
- Rukavac, population 66
- Vis, population 1,672
Town of Vis: Population trends 1857–2021
v

population	3601	3540	4317	4822	5257	5159	4840	4186	3718	3998	3561	2628	2217	2106	1960	1934	1918
	1857	1869	1880	1890	1900	1910	1921	1931	1948	1953	1961	1971	1981	1991	2001	2011	2021

Sources: Croatian Bureau of Statistics publications

== Economy ==
Until the middle of the twentieth century, the main sources of income were vineyards and wine production. In recent times, more and more people have been working in tourism. The town is also famous for the greenery of its palms, the only example on the eastern coast of the Adriatic Sea.

== Notable residents ==
- Niko pl. Giaxa (Jakša) (1845–1905), first national major of Vis
- Ivan Farolfi (1892–1945), high-ranked official and former mayor;
- Vesna Parun (1922–2010), acclaimed Croatian poet who was born in Zlarin but spent her childhood in Vis;

== Monuments and historical sites ==
- Remains of ancient Issa (thermae in the southern part of the town that were getting their water from a spring that used to be to the west of them, necropolis, theatre, parts of the port)
- Five Roman Catholic churches (Župna crkva Gospe od Spilica, Crkva svetog Ciprijana, Crkva svetog Duha, Franciscan monastery on peninsula of Prirovo and Crkva Vele Gospe)
- Residences of Hvar and Vis noble families (Hektorović, Jakša, Gariboldi, Dojmi Delupis)
- War forts dating from various times (from the Republic of Venice to Austria-Hungary)
- British Military Cemetery (dating from the British presence during the 1810s)

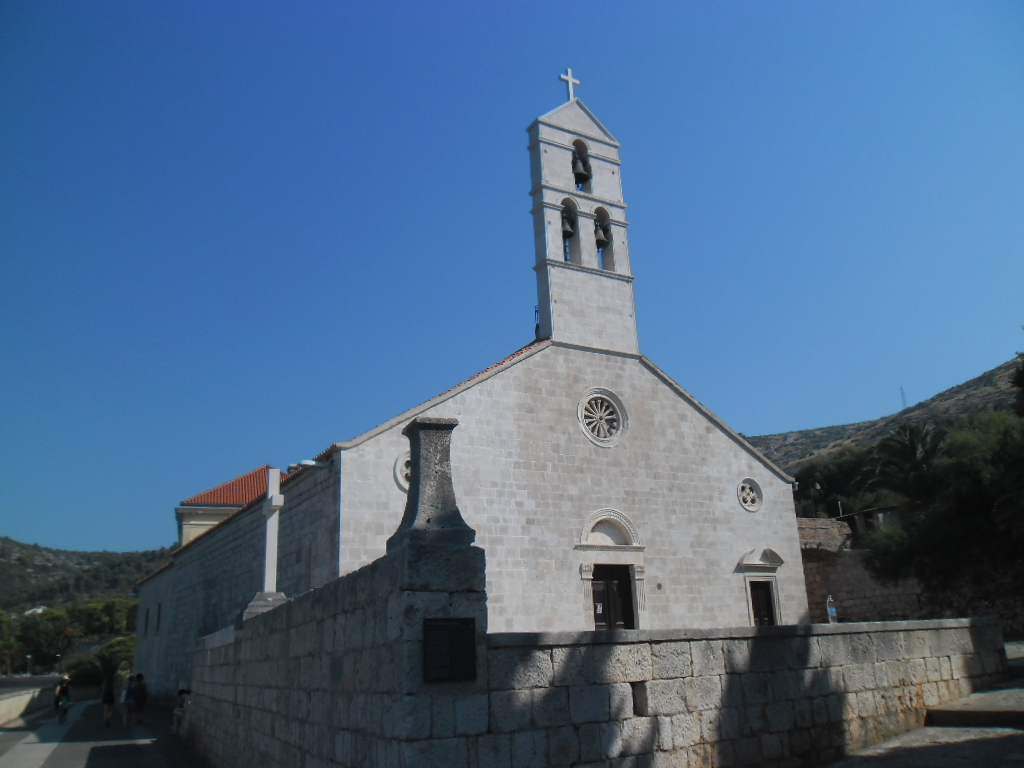
Church of Our Lady of Spilice

The Church of Our Lady of Spilice was named after smaller semi-caves that were on the site where it was built. Construction began on the land donated by Frano de Pelegrinis at the very beginning of the 16th century. According to archive documentation, the church was still unfinished in 1521, and the builders had increased its dimensions during construction, evidenced in various styles over time: Gothic, Renaissance and baroque. Its oldest part, in the central area, was built in the first half of the 16th century and shows the transition from Gothic to Renaissance style. The main door has fluted doorjambs upon which two semi-capitals support the transom. Above the door is a simple, well-defined semicircular lunette adorned with pinions. The rounded window of the façade is of the Renaissance period, whilst an attenuate distaff with three bells is the highest in Dalmatia. The church's naves are entered through two baroque doors over which are double-winged pediments and above them rounded windows. The church's interior is divided by broad semicircular arches on masonry pillars into three naves. With this, the unity of the space was achieved, illuminated by the long, narrow windows of the Gothic exterior, of which some were transferred from the old walls which dated back to the 16th century. The posterior part of the church was also enlarged with a baroque shrine, the chapel of St. Vicko and a sacristy. The altar polyptych was created by the famous Venetian painter Girolamo da Santacroce.

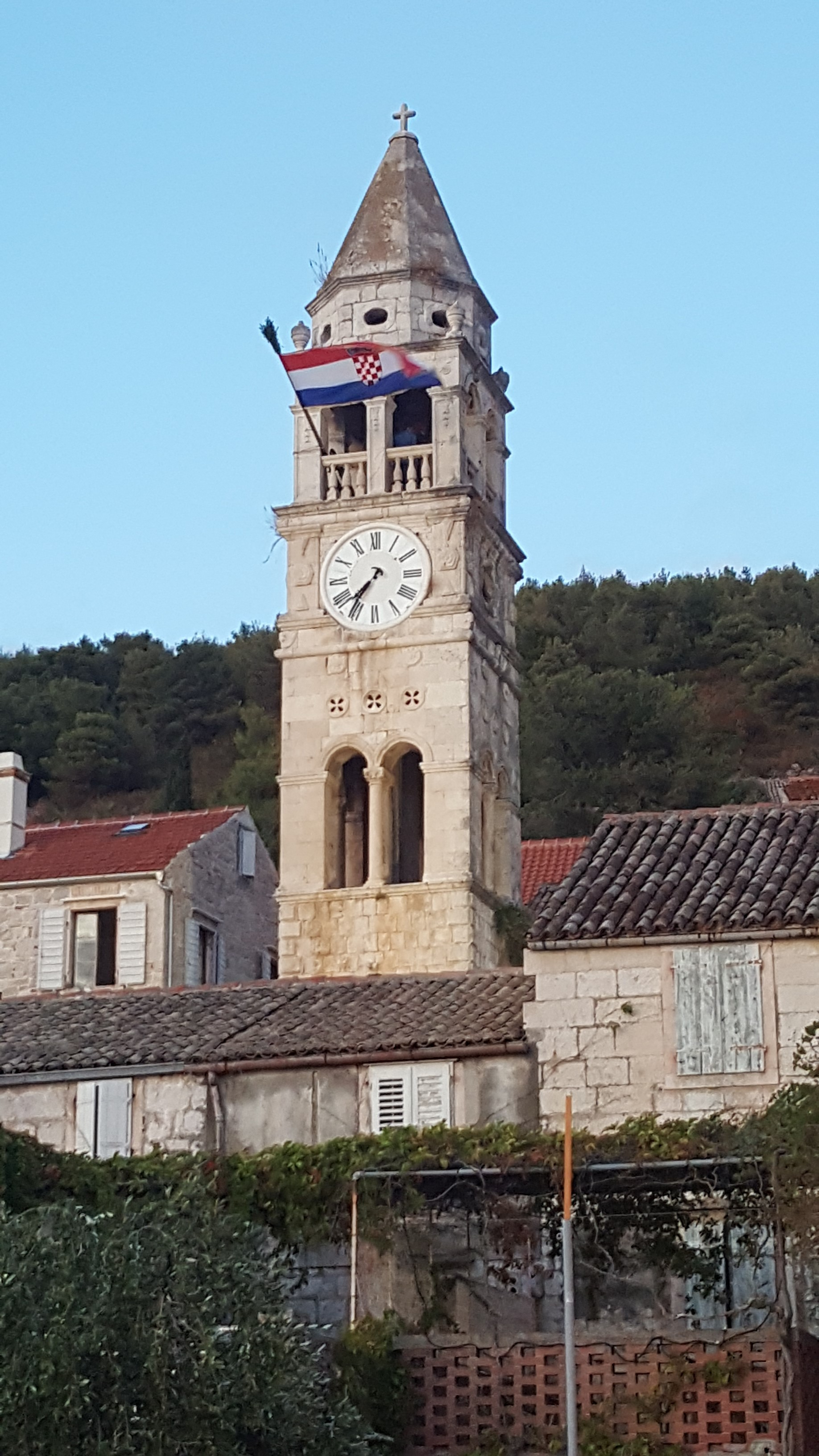
Bell tower of the Church of St. Cyprian and Justina

The late baroque Church of St. Cyprian and Justina was built in 1742 in the eastern part of Vis, in the region known as Kut. Here, there was once a church built at the beginning of the 15th century, whose remains are still visible in the rear wing of today's church, with an immured opening of a Gothic window. A flat façade of the church shows late baroque decorations weaving with a number of gothic motifs - rounded and quatrefoil windows intertwine with baroque vaults on a triangular pediment. Seven small windows together with a niche inside which was the statue of the martyr St. Cyprian constructors, adom the upper part of the façade which ends with borders that have been executed with laid and threaded vaults. In the lower part, closer to the portal, there are shallow pilasters above which are roses. The interior of the church hosts a spacious apse and two side chapels which give the church layout the form of a cross, but this is hardly noticeable thanks to the shallowness of the chapels. The church ceiling is wooden and relief coffered with decorations in the form of rhombuses with stylized flowers whilst in its centre a canvas has been inserted representing the Creator. Close to the church there is also a bell tower built at the same time. It is decorated in the same way as the church façade with horizontal belts, quatrefoil openings, relief roses, angel heads, elliptic windows and final vases. It also has loopholes oriented towards the port, thus making it is easy to see that the constructors had tried to use its dominant position to defense purpose too.

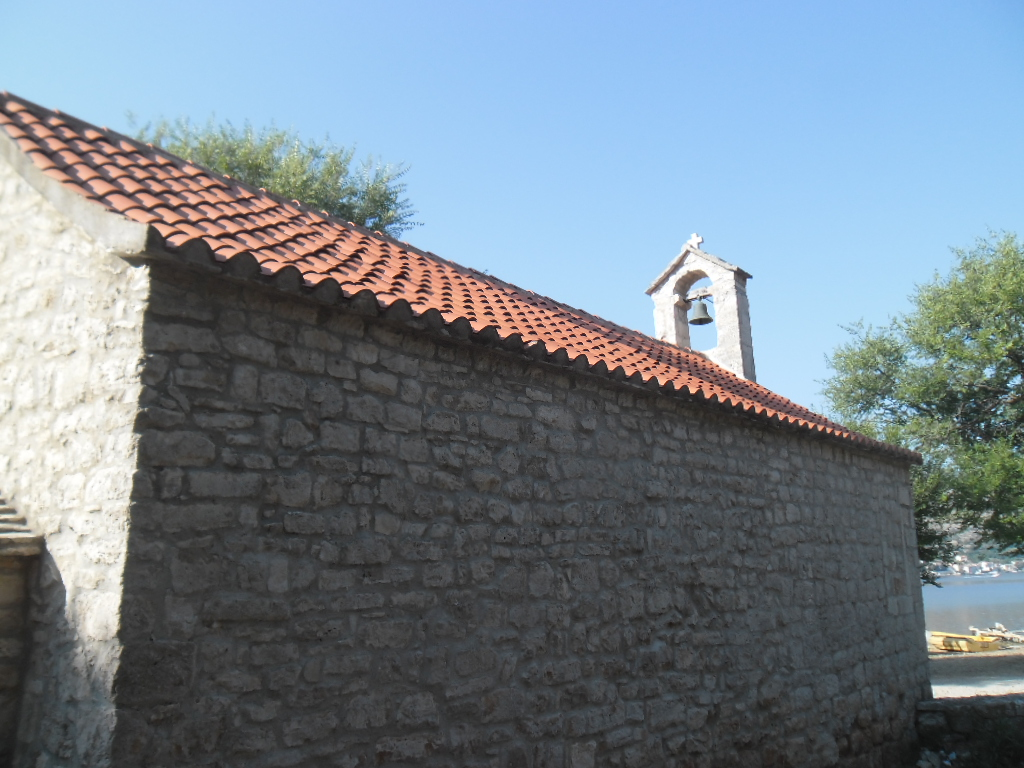
Church of St. George

The Church of St. George was built in the 9th century on a small peninsula situated at the entrance to the deep Vis bay. The Vis bay was named after it in the Middle Ages becoming the Port of St. George, there was also an islet at the entrance Škoj sv. Jurja (the cliff of St. George) as well as Jurjevo brdo (George's hill) to the east, and Saint George is the patron of the town of Vis. The church has been modified over time, so today the appearance of its façade on which the door have been enlarged and two smaller windows have been added, shows more stylistic characteristics of the 16th century than its original ones. Inside the church walls are divided with pilaster strips whilst two Byzantine amphorae have been built into the vault of the church. The Church's apse is semicircular with an altar that replaced the old one in the 17th century. Hermits lived here throughout the 15th century whose graves were found around the church.

The Church and monastery of St. Jerome was built on the small peninsula of Prirovo at the beginning of the 16th century. The church façade was made of marble taken from the adjacent ruins of ancient Issa, primarily from the Roman theatre over which the Franciscan monastery was built. The Church's door is simply profiled, adorned with swallow carved roses with a lunette above them. A little above the centre of the church façade there is a gothic renaissance window in the form of ring, surrounded by ovules. At the northern side doors there is unfinished relief of the stigmatisation.

The Gariboldi Palace was built in 1552. At the beginning of the 16th century, Frane Gariboldi moved from Milan to Hvar, becoming an inhabitant, and building a house and shop in a very crowded part of the town and a graveyard in the Franciscan church. He owned land on Vis and so built a palace there soon after on which above the portal of the outer, high façade wall he placed an inscription where he emphasized that he was a citizen of Hvar and outline his Milanese origins. LAVS DEO FRANCISCVS GARIBOLDVS MEDIOLANENSIS NVNC CIVIS LESINAE PRO SE IPSO AC FILIIS ET HEREDIBVS SIV HOC OPVS CONSTRVXIT MDLII. A paved courtyard extends behind the fenced wall that was later partitioned with divisions and shortened. There is also a well spring. The house façade was dismembered with profiled windows and bordered with the stone wreath of the roof adorned with stone acroterions in the form of a sphere. On the ground floor there is a cellar whilst stoned steps lead from the ground floor to the first floor and to the central door, above which is a Latin inscription. GLORIA LAVS ET HONOR TIBI SIT CHRISTE REDMEPTOR. Above the door a relief coat of arms stands out in which there is a fortress and four stars whilst on both sides there are the initials of Fran's name F.G.

The Gazarović Palace was built by the well-known Croatian writer, dramatist and poet Marin Gazarović, the author of Murat Gusar, Ljubica and other works-of-art. He built this palace as a place for resting and to monitor his land ownership, as did many other Dalmatian nobles on their coastal lands. The summer residence with courtyard, completed prior to the last decade of the 16th century, is surrounded by a high wall and on the Renaissance portal the following verses by Gazarović have been inscribed in Croatian. PRIN NER CHIES CA PROCIN OSTAVI HIMBE VAN CA OBECHIASC VCIN AC HOCH BIT VIROVAN VIROM XIVE OV VICH DRAGYE VIRAN SLVGA YER CA TVRDI COVICH TVRDI ZA ZLA DRVGA. Gazarović's palace was built in the late Renaissance style. On the ground floor there is a cellar illuminated by means of small rectangular windows, whilst on the outside stairs once leaned to the façade and up to the front door of the first floor. The writer's apartment of the writer was found there; the interior was completely changed by subsequent construction, whilst parts of the stone Renaissance basin which were found in many Dalmatian houses in the period from the 15th to the 18th century can still be seen in its original form. At the centre of the façade was Gazarović's coat of arms surrounded by mermaids whilst at the top there was a dragon with outstreched wings, which was carved by the writer himself.

The Renaissance and baroque one-story house of the Prdvarić family was built in the later 16th century and is situated at the part of Vis known as Kut, close to the sea. On the ground floor there was once a tavern, whilst on the first floor there is a central hall situated between side rooms which are entered through a door with profiled stone frames. In the hall covered by a wooden ceiling that relies on stone consoles, there is a profiled well's crown and a large walled in basin with two stone shelves on side consoles decorated with lilies, while at the bottom there is a grotesque mask in relief. Grotesque masks are typical decorations of Dalmatian wall basin from the 16th to the 18th century.

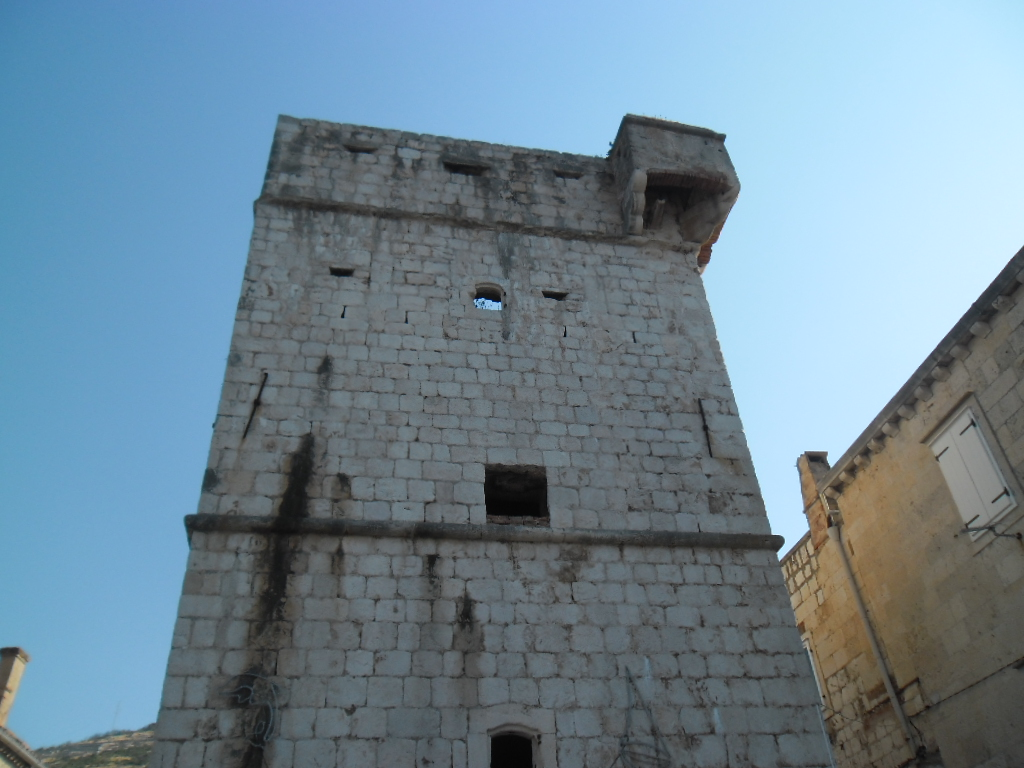
Perasti tower

The Perasti tower, kaštil, was built of Vicko of Perast in Bay of Kotor, in 1617. He requested permission to construct from the general commissioner which he received on December 16, 1616. There is not much information about Vicko of Perast, the builder of the tower. The earliest document in which he is mentioned dates back to 1587 in which his family was also mentioned. He was always given the title Sir (ser, dominus). Vicko of Perast lived in the Vis settlement of Luka, in his own house close to the tower, and died in 1622. He built the tower on his own land as defence from himself and other Vis inhabitants against possible Ottoman attacks on the town. The castle walls are divided by horizontal garlands whilst there are openings for cannons and loopholes along the walls. There are square sentry boxes standing on consoles at the corners of the tower whilst acroterions adorn their roof part. The tower was entered from a door situated on the first floor, which connected to Perasti's house by means of a wooden bridge. As this was the only in the door the tower, all equipment was brought inside along the wooden bridge and through it. The tower was armed with small bronze cannons that are mentioned in documents in the 17th in the 18th century. It was forbidden to build walls, houses and other facilities around the tower that would impede the defensive action of the cannons situated within it.

Our Lady's Battalion (Gospina batarija) is the main fortress built by the Austrians during their reign over the island. It was built in the 1830s, in the very heart of Vis Bay, in a place known as Levaman. Following the Italian occupation of Vis, this fortress was renamed Batteria della Madonna. The fortress surrounded by a 2 m deep trench whilst defence walls are inclined and made of finely worked stone. Entrance the fortress is from the eastern wing, constructed as an arch, with well worked stone protruding from a wall. The fortress itself was entered by means of a wooden drawbridge into a spacious rectangular courtyard on the bottom of which was a well to supply water to the fortress. In the southern part of the courtyard is an elevated embankment surrounded by a high inclined wall on which there were once cannons. Below the embankment is a lovely parabolic arched vault with storage spaces and a dungeon. The main building is to be found in the southern part with a single storey and floor were command of the island and a barracks for the accommodation of officers and soldiers were situated. During the remarkable Battle of Vis, which took place from July 18 to July 20, 1866, it played an important role, damaging the Italian ship, Formidabile, captained by Simone Antonio Saint-Bon.

Fort George was built by the British when Austrian Imperial authority in region was ceded to the French as a part of a humiliating peace settlement dictated by Napoleon. Fearing Napoleon would turn the Adriatic into a French lake, with free rein to launch warships from the Venetian Arsenal and expand his empire further into Europe, the Royal Navy was sent to the Adriatic with a regiment of foot and detachment of artillery to prevent Napoleon's ambitions coming to fruition. The British had used the island of Vis for its fresh water and safe anchorage for a number of years prior the committing defences to the island. In 1811 the French successfully raided the bay of Vis inflicting damage to the town and destroying numerous merchant vessels. It was hence decided that the bay of Vis needed protection from further such attacks. Initial defences were built on Host Island in the middle of the harbour, consisting of two 18 pound guns in a stone fortification. In 1812 Fort George was begun after the British Governor, Colonel Robertson, decided that the harbour needed greater protection. Fort George was to be primarily a light cannon and musketry defence and was therefore built to cooperate with three further Martello towers; towers Bentick and Robertson to the rear of the fort and Wellington across the bay. Like the defences on Host Island, these Martello towers would carry large cannon able of deterring enemy ships from approaching the bay. The defense towers and Fort George were built under the supervision of Captain Henryson using labourers recruited directly from the island and remained strictly under the jurisdiction of the army whilst the battery on Host Island remained under the control of the Royal Navy. The defences were completed by late 1813 and two years later were handed to the Austrians, who had begun reclaiming control of their Adriatic territories following decline and eventual fall of Napoleonic forces in the region.

There is no information on when and where in Issa the bronze bust of the goddess Artemis was found. It was held in a house on the island of Vis, and was probably part of the collection of the Dojmi family of Vis. In the 1950s it was brought to the Archaeological Museum in Split, where many years of conservation works and scholarly analysis commenced. It belonged to a bronze sculpture between 1.5 and 1.6 m in height. The bust depicts a young woman with an idealized appearance. Her face, with no lines, exudes the harmonious tranquility of her internal disposition. The eyes are large and lined with a light leaf (lead), which creates a powerful colourist contrast in relation to the greenish patina of the bronze. The young woman's eye sockets are nicely sculpted, and the mouth is small. The hair is wavy and quite natural, so that even individual locks are intertwined. It is parted down the middle, and combed into a bun at the back of her head, leaving her ears free. There is a diadem just above the forehead, which has on it a decoration resembling a tendril. The neck is broken off of the body in a jagged line. The facial expression and the shape of the head indicate sculptural elements based on the tradition of Praxiteles. It is an original Greek cult statue made in either the late fourth or early third century BC. There is a considerable archaeological evidence testifying to the cult of Artemis in Issa.

== Education ==
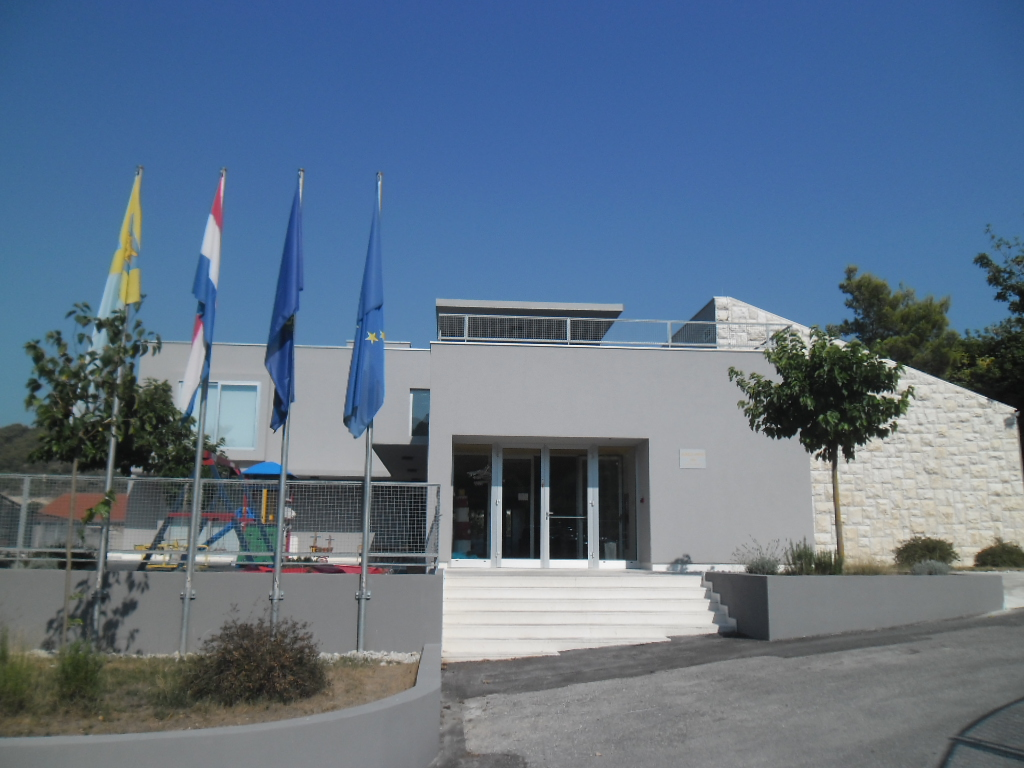
Kindergarten in Vis

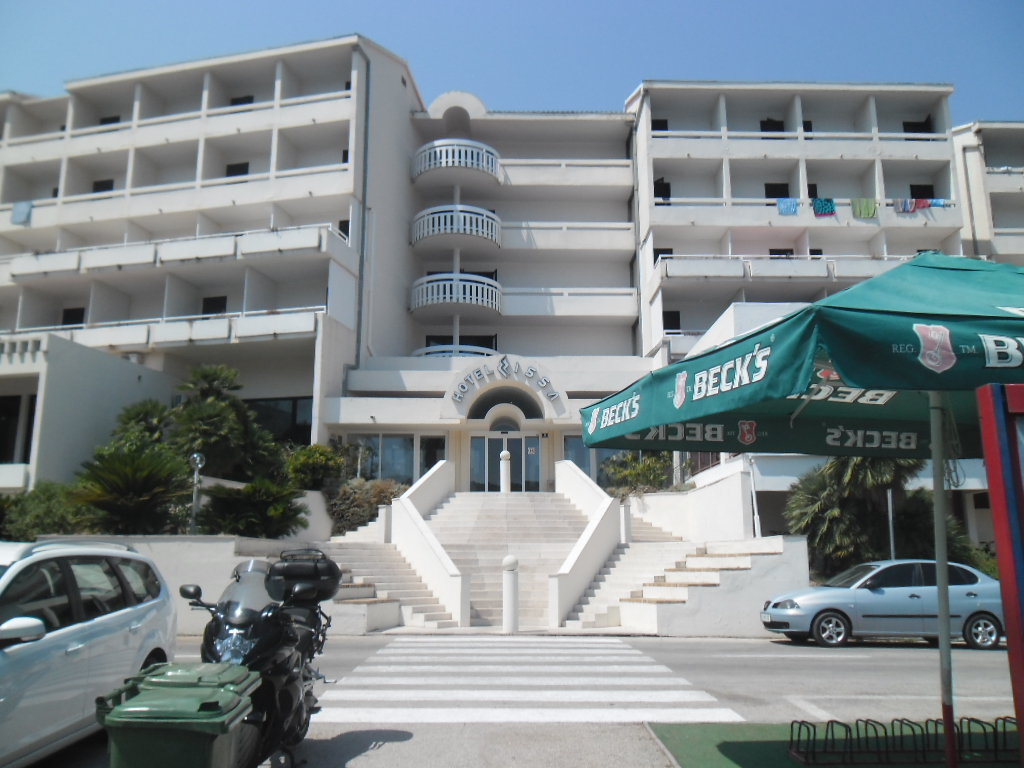
Hotel in Vis

- Vis Primary school
- Until the 1960s secondary schools existed in the villages of Podselje, Podstražje and Marine Zemlje but these were eventually closed because of the lack of students due to drastic emigration that affected the island as a whole. In 1975 a secondary school named after Antun Matijašević - Karamaneo was built. It remains the sole centre of secondary education on the island.

== Sports ==
- Cricket Club, named after Sir William Hoste, Bt.
- ŠRC Issa (sport and recreation club Issa)
- Bowling club Vis
- Football club Vis

== Acknowledgements ==
=== Honorary citizens ===
- 1995: Giullio Einaudi
- 2001: Petar Stipetić
- 2005: Stipe Mesić
- 2011: Stanislav Selak

Source: Town of Vis official website

== See also ==
- Croatia
- Vis (island)
- Dalmatia
