= D121 road =

Road in Croatia

D121 state road

Route information
- Length: 14.0 km (8.7 mi)

Major junctions
- From: Murter
- To: D8 and D59 near Pirovac

Location
- Country: Croatia
- Counties: Šibenik-Knin
- Major cities: Murter, Tisno, Pirovac

Highway system
- Highways in Croatia

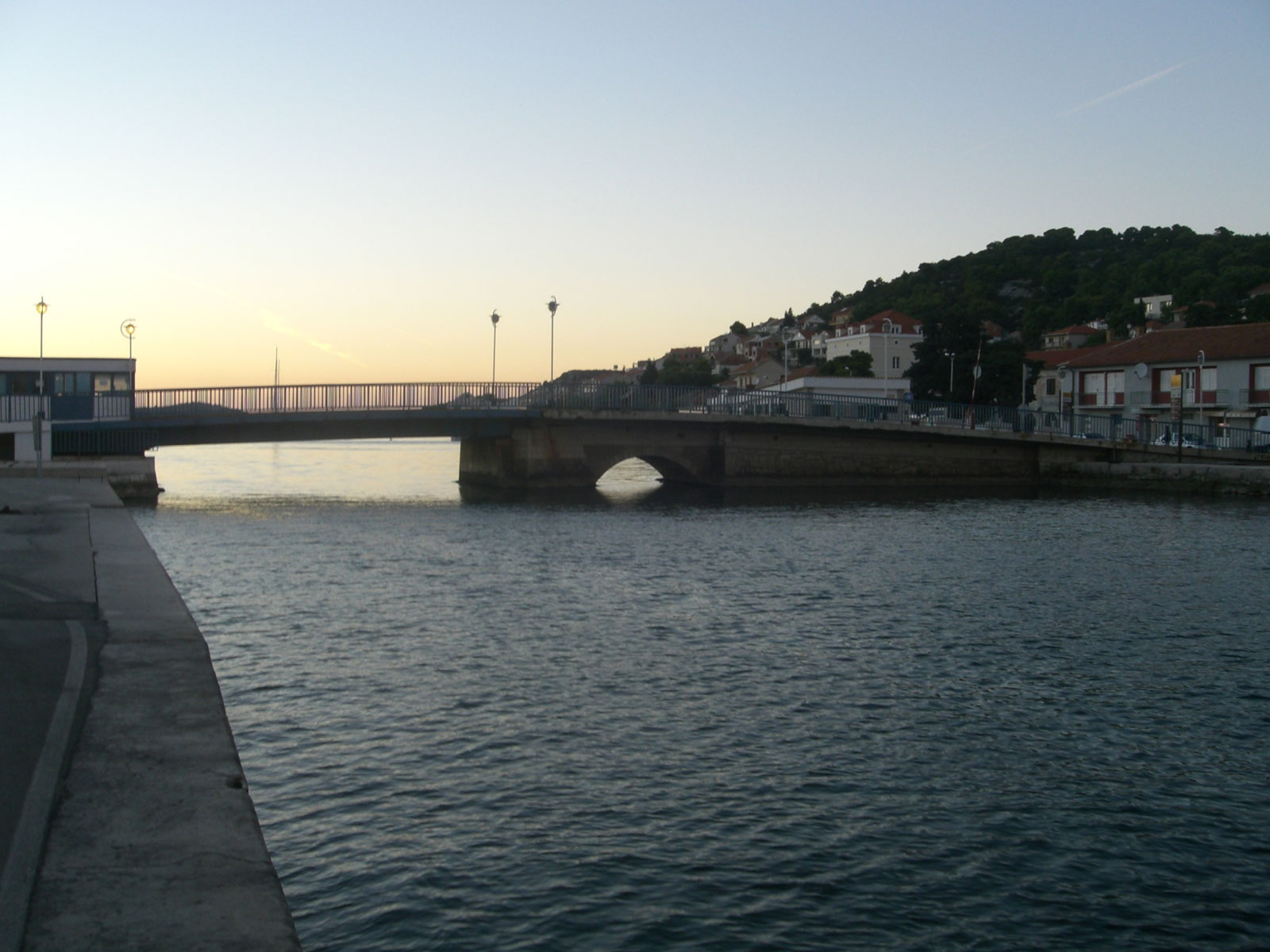
Tisno, a movable bridge carrying the D121 road

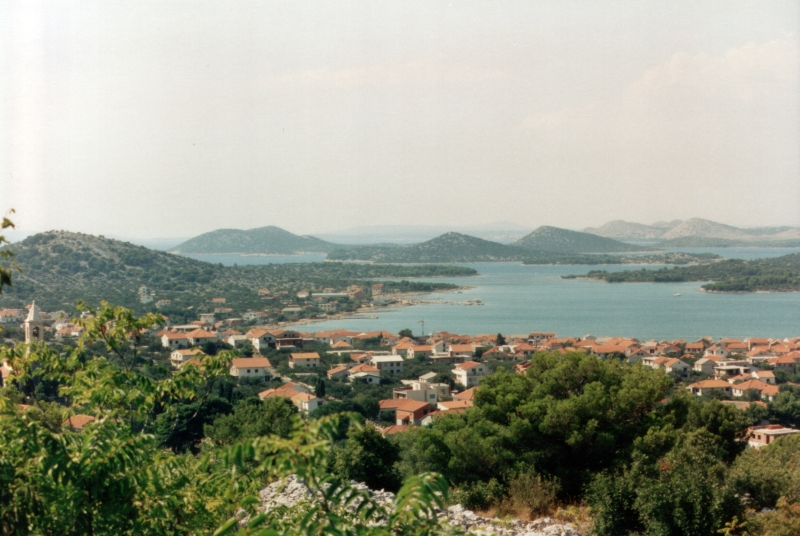
Murter, at the southern terminus of the D121 road

D121 is a state road connecting the island of Murter with D8 state road near Pirovac.

The southern terminus of the road is located in the town of Murter. The northern terminus is immediately to the south of Pirovac. The intersection with D8 state road, where D121 terminates, also represents the southern terminus of D59 state road to Knin. The road is 14.0 km (8.7 mi) long.

The road crosses from the mainland to the Murter Island in Tisno via a movable bridge. The bridge is raised twice a day for 30 minutes to allow passage of vessels through the strait.

The road, as well as all other state roads in Croatia, is managed and maintained by Hrvatske ceste, a state-owned company.

== Traffic volume ==
Traffic is regularly counted and reported by Hrvatske ceste, operator of the road. Substantial variations between annual (AADT) and summer (ASDT) traffic volumes are attributed to the fact that the road serves as an approach to a number of resorts, carrying considerable tourist traffic.

D121 traffic volume
Road	Counting site	AADT	ASDT	Notes
D121	5304 Murter	2,489	4,920	Between two Ž6250 junctions.

== Road junctions and populated areas ==
D121 junctions/populated areas
Type	Slip roads/Notes
	D8 to Pirovac (to the west) and to Vodice (to the east). D59 to Knin. The northern terminus of the road.
	Tisno
	Ž6085 to Jezera.
	Ž6250 to Betina. The road loops to the village, and back to D121 route rejoining it in the town of Murter.
	Murter; The southern terminus of the road.
