= D59 road =

Road in Croatia

D59 state road

Route information
- Length: 53.6 km (33.3 mi)

Major junctions
- From: D1 just west of Knin
- D56 in Bribirske Mostine; A1 at the Pirovac interchange D27 near Putičanje
- To: D8 and D121 near Pirovac

Location
- Country: Croatia
- Counties: Zadar, Šibenik-Knin
- Major cities: Knin, Pirovac

Highway system
- Highways in Croatia

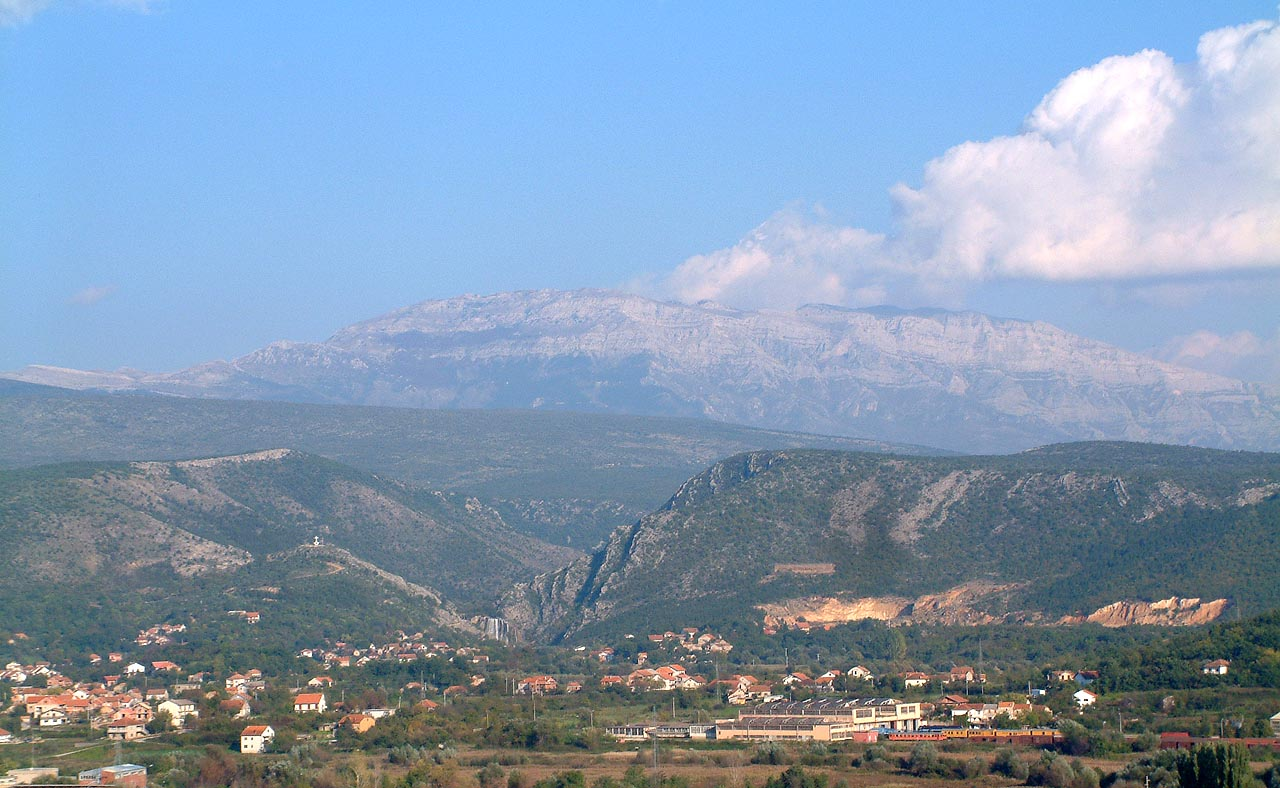
Knin, at the northern terminus of D59

D59 is a state road connecting the city of Knin with D8 state road near Pirovac.

The road also serves as a connecting road to the A1 motorway as it is connected to Pirovac interchange via a short connector road. The northern terminus of the road is located immediately to the west of Knin, and the road is normally considered to run to the city itself. Likewise, the southern terminus is immediately to the south of Pirovac. The intersection with D8 state road, where D59 terminates, also represents the northern terminus of D121 state road to Murter. The road is 53.6 km (33.3 mi) long.

The road, as well as all other state roads in Croatia, is managed and maintained by Hrvatske ceste, a state-owned company.

== Traffic volume ==
Traffic is regularly counted and reported by Hrvatske ceste, operator of the road. Substantial variations between annual (AADT) and summer (ASDT) traffic volumes are attributed to the fact that the road serves as a connection to A1 motorway and it carries substantial tourist traffic.

D59 traffic volume
| Road | Counting site | AADT | ASDT | Notes |
| D59 | 5006 Radučić east | 1,184 | 1,839 | Adjacent to Ž6054 junction. |
| D59 | 5302 Kistanje | 1,177 | 1,904 | Adjacent to Ž6074 junction. |
| D59 | 5319 Čista Mala south | 1,921 | 3,892 | Between Ž6071 and D27 junctions. |

== Road junctions and populated areas ==
D59 junctions/populated areas
| Type | Slip roads/Notes |
| | D1 to Knin (to the east) and to Gračac (to the west). |
| | L65008 to Oćestovo |
| | Radučić; Ž6054 to Mokro Polje |
| | Ž6055 to Oklaj |
| | L65005 to Ivoševci |
| | Kistanje |
| | Ž6074 to Varivode |
| | Đevrske; Ž6070 to Dobropoljci |
| | Bribirske Mostine; D56 westwards to Žažvić and Benkovac; D56 eastwards to Piramatovci and Skradin D56 and D59 form two junctions, 300 m (980 ft) apart, and on this short section they are concurrent. |
| | As of 2008, there is 3 km (1.9 mi) of gravel road between the southern intersection in Bribirske Mostine and the northern entrance to Krković; Alternate routes via L65018/L65017 Žažvić/Međare/Cicvare or via Ž6073 Piramatovci |
| | Krković |
| | Lađevci |
| | A1 in Pirovac interchange reached via a short connector road. |
| | Ž6071 to Čista Mala and Gaćelezi |
| | D27 to Grabovci (to the east) and to Stankovci (to the west). |
| | Putičanje |
| | Dazlina |
| | Dubrava kod Tisna |
| | D8 to Vodice (to the east) and to Pirovac (to the west). D121 to Tisno and Murter. |

== See also ==
- Hrvatske autoceste
