= Our Lady of the Sea =

Replica Croatia sailboat

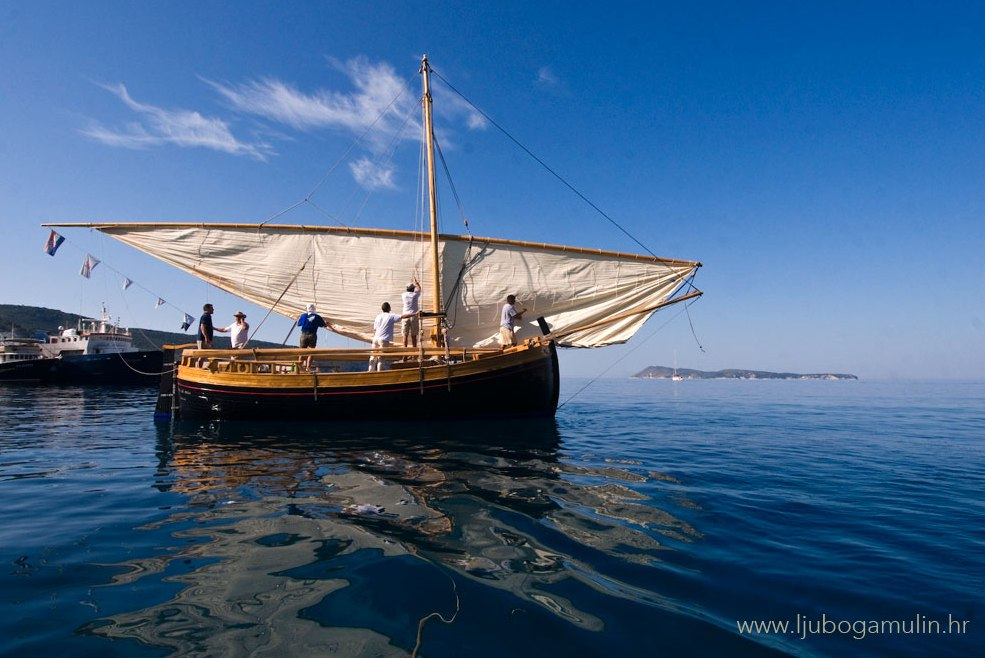
- Raising lateen sail on bracera "Our Lady of the Sea"

History

- Name: Our Lady of the Sea
- Owner: The Dolphin Dream Society
- Operator: The Dolphin Dream Society
- Ordered: December 2005
- Builder: Mile Jadrešić, Betina, Murter
- Completed: October 2010
- Maiden voyage: April 2012
- Identification: 237 DB, Dubrovnik - Croatia
- Notes: more info: Maritima ART

General characteristics
- Class & type: single masted bracera
- Displacement: 8704 kg
- Length: 9.75 m/17.6 m (31 ft/58 ft)
- Beam: 3.6 m (12 ft)
- Height: 14.8 m (48 ft 6 in)
- Draught: 0.87 m (2 ft 10 in). Max: 1.2 m (3 ft 11 in)
- Depth: 1.98 m (6 ft 6 in)
- Propulsion: Iveco, 64 kW
- Speed: Cruising: 5 kn (10 km/h, 5.75 mph). Max: 10 kn (20 km/h, 11.5 mph)
- Capacity: Passengers: 6–8 (maximum 12)
- Crew: 2–3

Bracera "Our Lady of the sea" (Croatian: Gospa od mora) is a replica of a traditional Croatian sailboat from the 18th century launched in April 2011 and operated by The Dolphin Dream Society. She was built by Mile Jadrešić, a traditional boat builder from Betina on the island of Murter, according to designs of Velimir Salamon and Nenad Bobanac. Before departing for Dubrovnik, her home port, "Our Lady of the Sea" was christened on April 19, 2012 in Supetar, Hvar with Croatian poet and novelist Vesna Krmpotić as her godmother.

As of 2013 this traditional bracera was docked in ACI Marina Dubrovnik, used for educational purposes and special excursion tours with its main aims being the promotion and preservation of the maritime heritage of the Adriatic region.

== Photo gallery ==
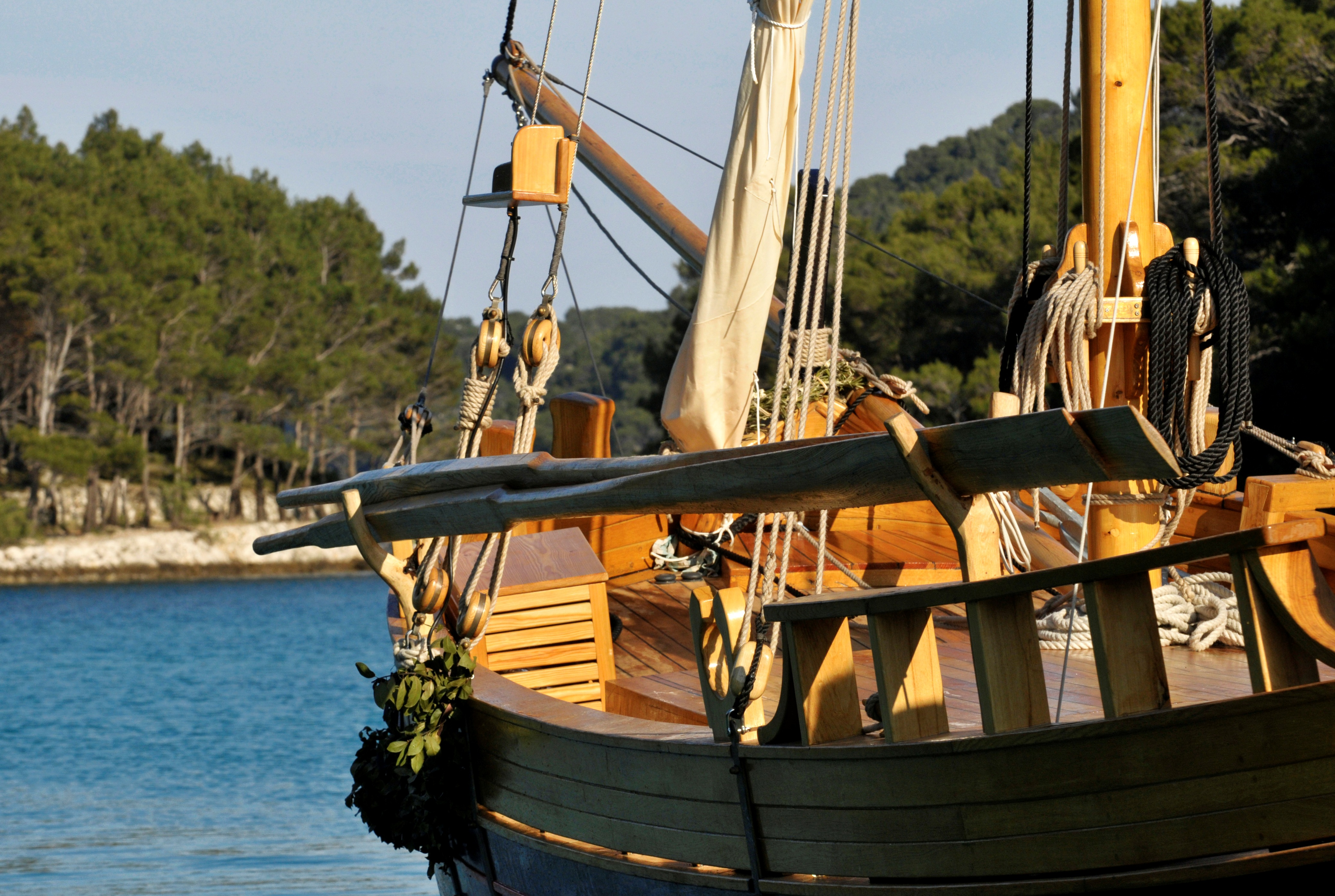
Deck details with a pair of oars

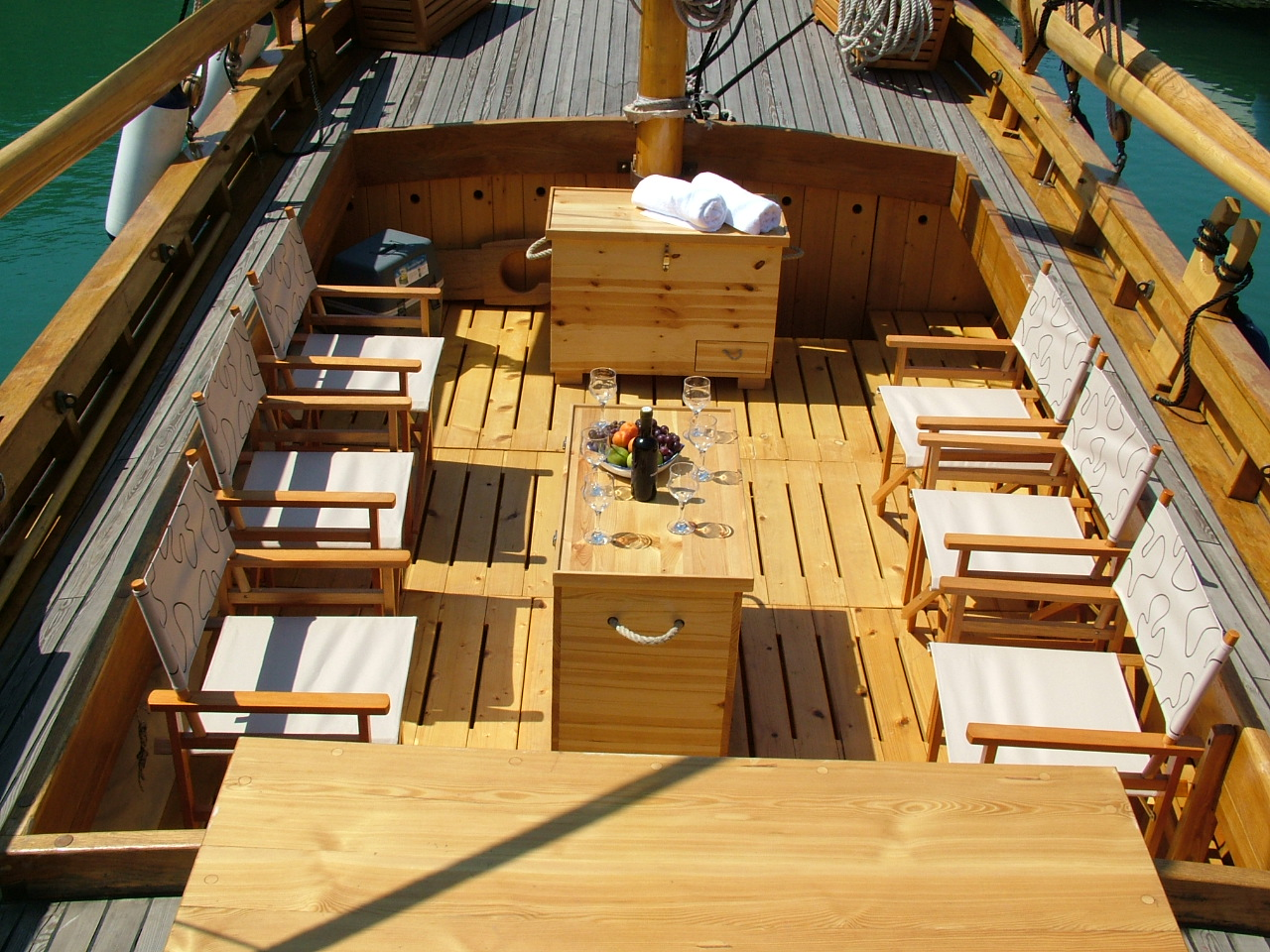
The interior of "Our Lady of the Sea"

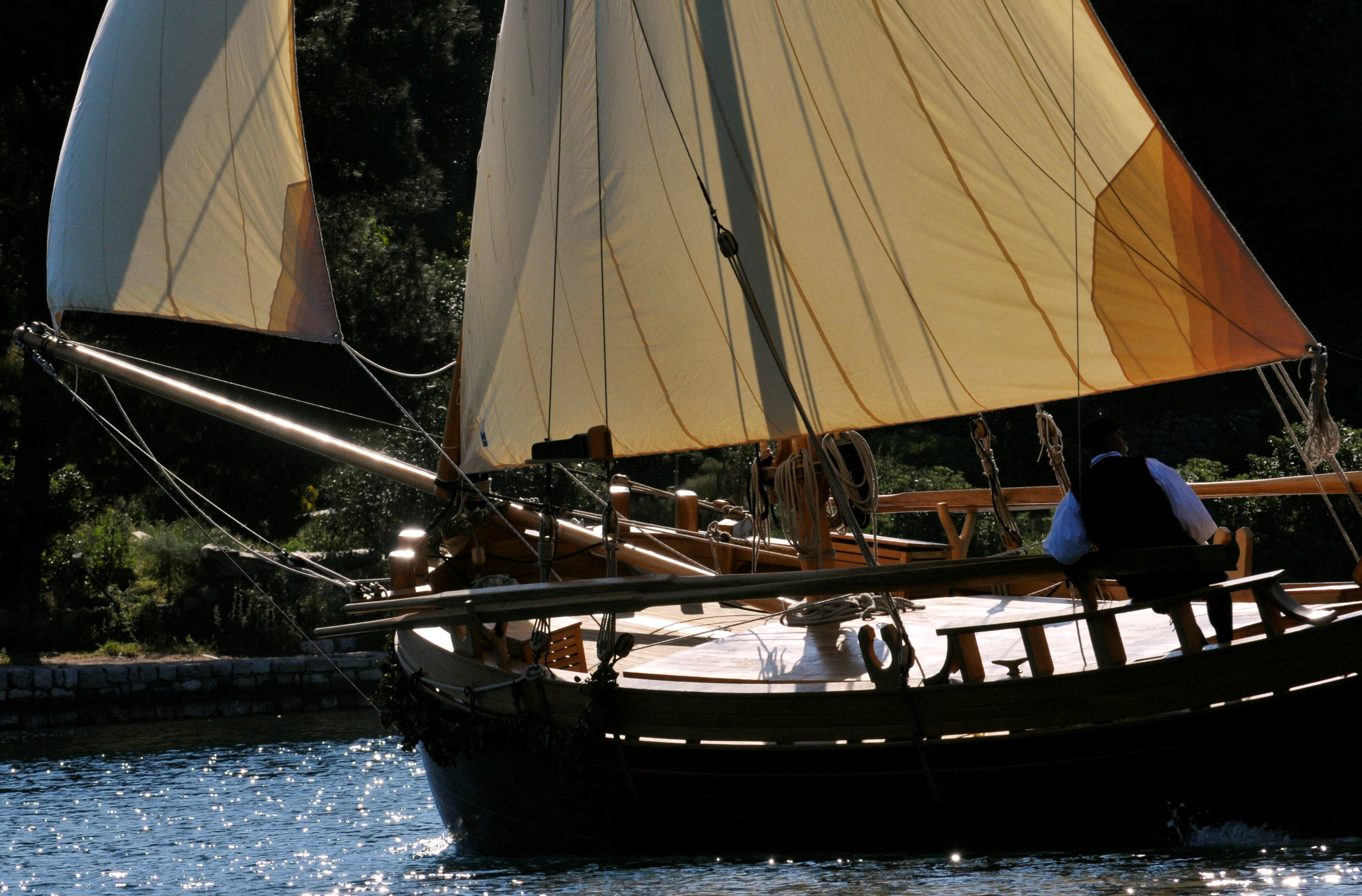
"Our Lady of the sea" sailing on Mljet lake

== See also ==
- Bracera
- Falkuša
- Dalmatia
- Boat building
- Batana
- The Dolphin Dream Society
