= Gračina Viewpoint =

Scenic viewpoint in Šibenik-Knin, Croatia

Coordinates: 43.81862°N 15.66833°E

Gračina Viewpoint is situated in Croatia, in the Municipality of Tisno, between Ivinj and Tisno. The viewpoint is 113 meters above sea level and there is a view of Tisno, Pirovac and Lake Vrana as well as the islands of Murter and Kornati. There is a television transmitter at the viewpoint.
