= Bracera =

Traditional Croatian sailing vessel

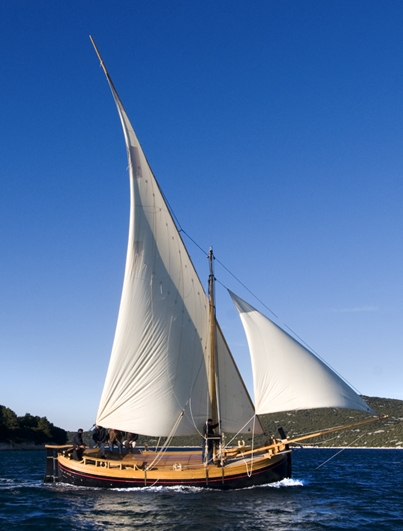
Traditional Croatian sailing boat [cro. bracera] "Our Lady of the Sea" sailing with its Lateen sail

A bracera or brazzera (pronounced [ˈbratsera]) is a traditional Adriatic coastal cargo sailing vessel originated in Dalmatia and first recorded in the 16th-century chronicles. Along with its larger sisters - trabakuls and peligs, braceras formed the backbone of the commercial fleet on the Adriatic Sea with one masted one being the most prominent and best known. This solid and very mobile boat with wide hips and blunt bow was particularly suitable for commerce and communication between the many islands of the Adriatic as well as neighboring coasts. Already in the 19th century over 800 of them were listed in the Austro-Hungarian fleet register covering vessels of the Dalmatian and Istrian coasts. Adriatic braceras distinguish from the vessels carrying same/similar names like, for example, in the Aegean Sea. Unlike there, on the Adriatic the term refers to the entire boat, the system that consists of the hull and the rig as well, and not merely the sail.

Today, The Dolphin Dream Society is operating Dubrovnik waters with a unique one masted bracera replica called "Our Lady of the Sea" aiming to promote Croatian maritime heritage through responsible tourism.

== Origin ==
Some argue that the name "bracera" and its other local variants such as "bracijera", "brazzera" or "Brasero" is derived from the fact that these sailing boats were the biggest boats that could be driven by a single oarsman. The term "brazzera" itself indicates sarcastically that you would get tired training your arms any time that there would be no wind. ("brazzo" = "arm" and "-er(a)" = "a place full of") ("andar de brazza" = "using the arms" meaning "with the power of your hands") ("darghe de brazzo" = "using your strength" rather than skill or cunningness). Thus the name of the boat is related to a specific size and weight and not to any particular shape of the hull or any single type of rigging, this explains the extreme variety of small vessels which are called "brazzera".

Others trace the etymology of the word "bracera", historically recorded first as "brazzera", from the Dalmatian island of "Brazza", modern day Brač, widely recognized as the place of birth of this type of vessel.

== Advantages and usage ==
With a vast number of small islands and many estates spread across them, it is suggested local Dalmatian population saw more advantages in building the smaller, more convenient and cheaper bracers instead of bigger and more costly trabakuls and peligs. Other professional and scientific reasoning indicate that bracera was the most convenient vessel for the narrow sea areas between the many (over a thousand) Adriatic islands, for the wavelengths on the East Adriatic coast, and was suitable for using numerous bays as hideouts from the strong and sudden squalls of the wind as well as the wavy sea.

Braceras in particular sailed as small coastal sailing ships used for transport of wood for construction and fuel wood, mostly from Senj to the south and the islands, and later for the transport of salt and sand. Braceras also transported wine, olive oil and everything else that was produced on the islands from Istria to Dubrovnik, as well as livestock. In Istria they were also used for fishing and in Dalmatia for pulling out sea sponges.

== Types of bracera ==
As a boat of hardworking practical people braceras often changed through history. The boat designers tended to question rig designs that proved less efficient and replace it with improved new solutions. Similar to the folk saying, only the best was regarded as truthful, indicates professor Velimir Salamon, Croatian expert on traditional boat building. Braceras could have been seen with the lateen sails, the lug or the gaff rig, the jib sails, and in spite of the opinion popular in Dalmatia in the 19th century, braceras could have two, and in some cases three masts.

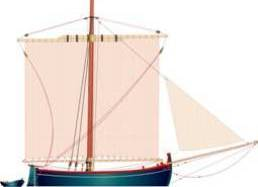
A single masted square sail bracera

=== The single mast bracera with square sail ===
In the beginning the braceras were presumably square or sprit rigged, considering these were amongst the oldest rigs known. Much like the Hansa kogge boat type (Croatian: koka, square sail braceras had a yard and a boom. The very sail was elevated by the yard (plus the tackle) and was kept in place by the yard halliards and the braces. With a new, small see and changing winds more adequate, type of sails gaining on popularity square sailed braceras became a rarity on the Adriatic.

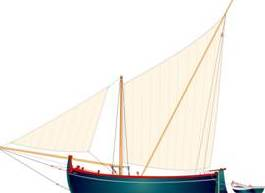
A single masted sprit sail bracera

=== The single mast bracera with the sprit sail ===
Despite the lack of a strong scientific proof, it is generally assumed that the Adriatic braceras were at first sprit rigged . This can be seen even today on the children’s sports boat today known as Optimist. In addition to having a mast braceras had a sprit sail, a pole/bar stretching from the under part of the mast up to the top of the sail and a prow-sprit to place the jib.

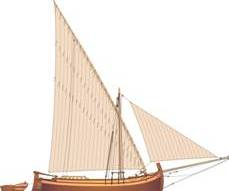
A single masted lateen sail bracera

=== The single mast bracerae with the lateen sail ===
The lateen style triangular shaped sail was used in the Mediterranean as early as the Antique time. With the weak winds frequent in the Mediterranean basin, the lateen sail quickly replaced other forms of sails as it made sailing against the wind possible. The rig was commonly consisting of the mast, the lanteen with a triangular sail attached to it, the halliard for raising the lanteen, the parrel (usually placed on the left mast side); a sequence of thin short ropes on the sail for shortening it, the tacking rig used for insuring the front lateen end, and the sheet or poža / škota for keeping in place the back sail end.

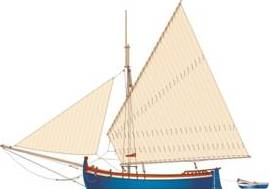
A single masted lug rigged bracera

=== The lug rigged single mast bracera from the island of Brač ===
Most sources describe the lug sail as an intermediate step towards the lateen sail, as used in the Indian Ocean. There is speculation that the lateen may have evolved back towards a balanced lug rig, as used in the Adriatic.

=== The gaff rigged single mast bracera/ Dubrovnik bracera ===
The Dubrovnik type bracera “St. Nicholas” (Croatian: Sv. Nikola) that can be seen in the Maritime Museum in Dubrovnik on an oil painting, was probably constructed in one of the shipyards on the island of Korčula and is portrayed with the gaff rigging.

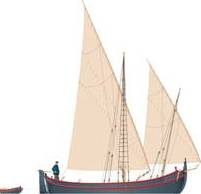
A double masted Istrian bracera

=== The two mast lateen rigged Istrian bracera ===
Even though every larger shipyard on the Adriatic was building braceras, large number of the Istrian type of braceras were constructed in shipyards of Piran (present day Slovenia). These, unlike in Dalmatia, used to be vessels with two masts and with a lateen rig known from the antiquity, at first. Although this type of rig permitted sailing in directions opposite to wind, it would be without exception replaced by other rig types proven to be more efficient. Some photographs, however, indicate that the lateen rig was used even in the 20th century - all the way until sails disappeared from the sea, and were substituted by the motor propulsion.

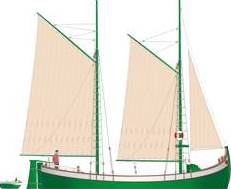
A double masted gaff rigged bracera

=== The two mast gaff rigged Istrian bracera ===
The Istrian braceras are known to have two and in some cases three masts, opposed to the 19th century braceras from Dalmatia that customarily displayed only one mast. A number of these vessels could have been seen in service throughout the Adriatic coast. The function and the usage of the vessel changed as its rig and the requirements of the time and the prevailing styles changed as well. The original authentic braceras were in most cases converted into salbunijeri, hired to dredge and transport sand from the rock bottom of the Cetina river. Many of the land buildings in Dalmatian region were built thanks to sand excavated by these wooden vessels. One of them was the bracera “Sv. Ivan”. Today, as sand digging is no longer allowed for the sake of preservation of eco-system, these vessels are nowadays often converted to meet the demands of tourism.

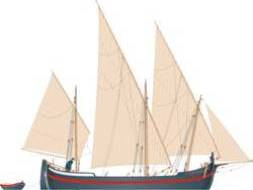
A triple masted Rovinj bracera

=== The three mast bracera from Rovinj ===
In the small Istrian fishing town Rovinj the bracera was also known as the braciera and is mentioned in variety of historic documents. The Rovinj braciera shows that the braceras could bear up to three masts (two in the front/prow part of the ship: (1) the first one inclined towards the prow and (2)a lug-rigged in the middle; the third one (3) the bowsprit side by side with the sea). In an old magazine “L’Istria” (1846) by Casamia Carer, the Rovinj brasiera is portrayed as one of the most voluble witnesses of Rovinj's history. Even though the flat bottomed batana stayed the most recognizable Rovinj and Northern Adriatic boat, the braciera was important to the extent she was portrayed in the testimonial painting displayed in the St. Maria delle Grazie church in Rovinj.

== Braceras today ==
=== The oldest surviving bracera "Roditelj" (eng. "The Parent") ===
The "Roditelj" bracera is the oldest original preserved bracera on the Adriatic and is officially protected as cultural heritage of the Republic of Croatia. "Roditelj" was built back in 1907 in Piran, today Slovenia. She was built without any machining, entirely as a handwork of old craftsmen and made of quality oak. It was originally in service as a transport ship, transferring mostly stone. In mid 20th century she was given motor propulsion and thus became an 8 knots motor sailboat. She played an important role during the WW II when used for transfer of refugees from Dalmatian islands to Bari, Italy from where they would continue to El Shatt, Egypt. After the war, "Roditelj" continued its service as a transfer ship until 1982 when it became an attractive excursion boat. She was damaged in bombardment during the '90s war while docked in Dubrovnik after which she was renewed in Korčula shipyard. Today it is owned by a local Tourist Board with its home port being Supetar, a small town on the island of Brač.

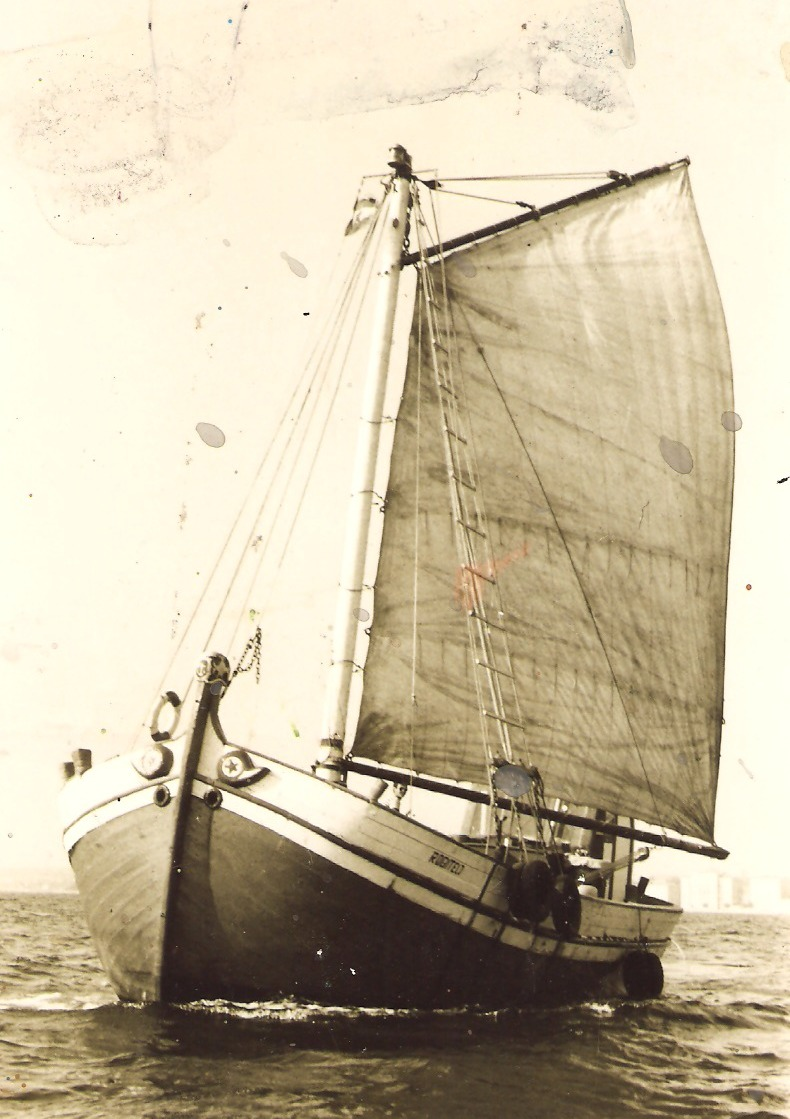
Old photo of "Roditelj" with a gaff rigging

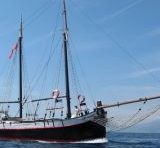
The two mast bracera "Roditelj"

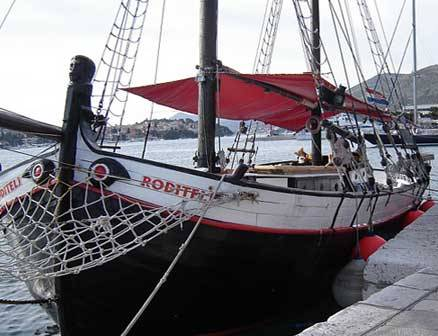
"Roditelj" docked in Gruž port, Dubrovnik

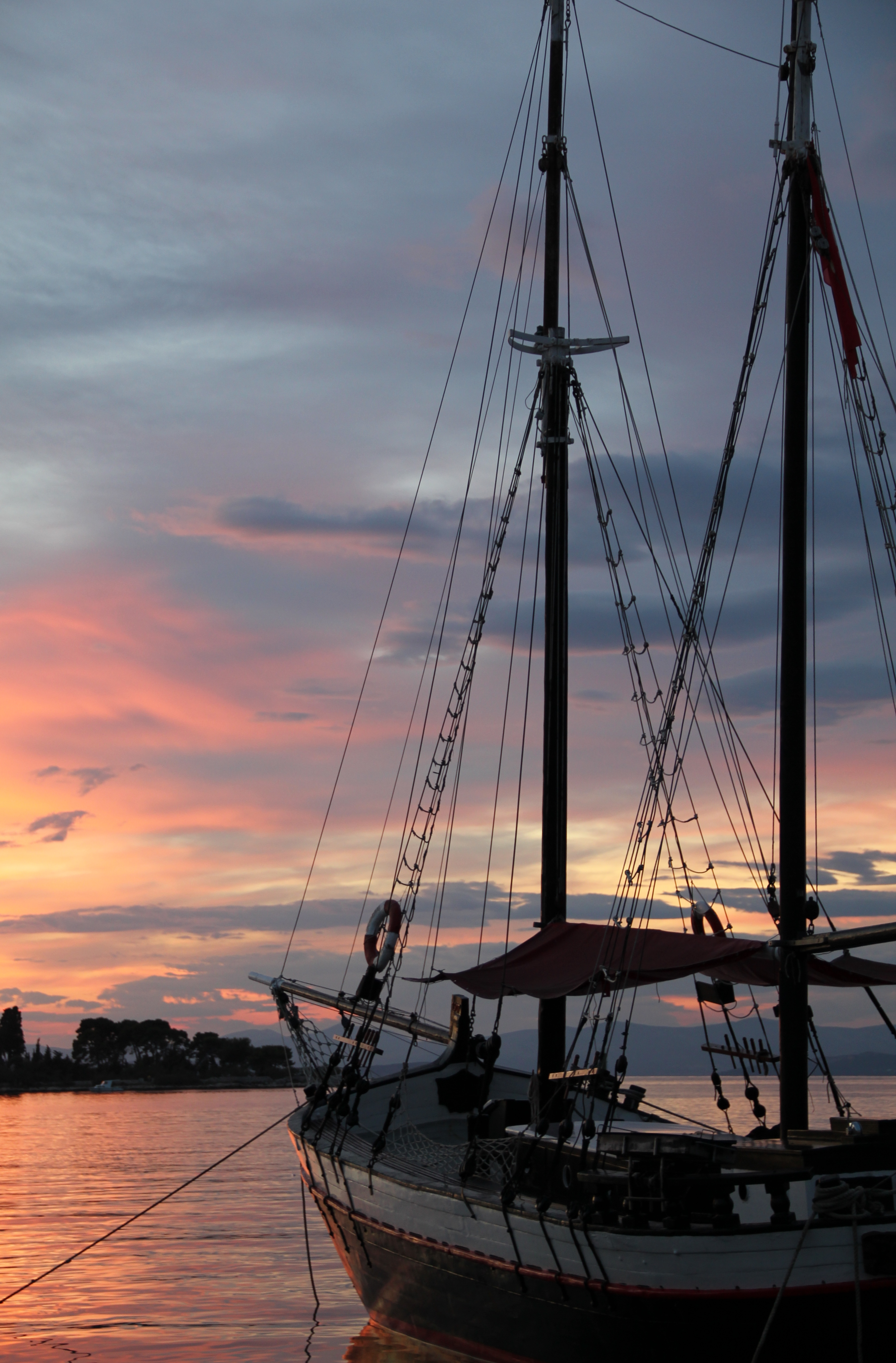
Bracera "Roditelj" anchored

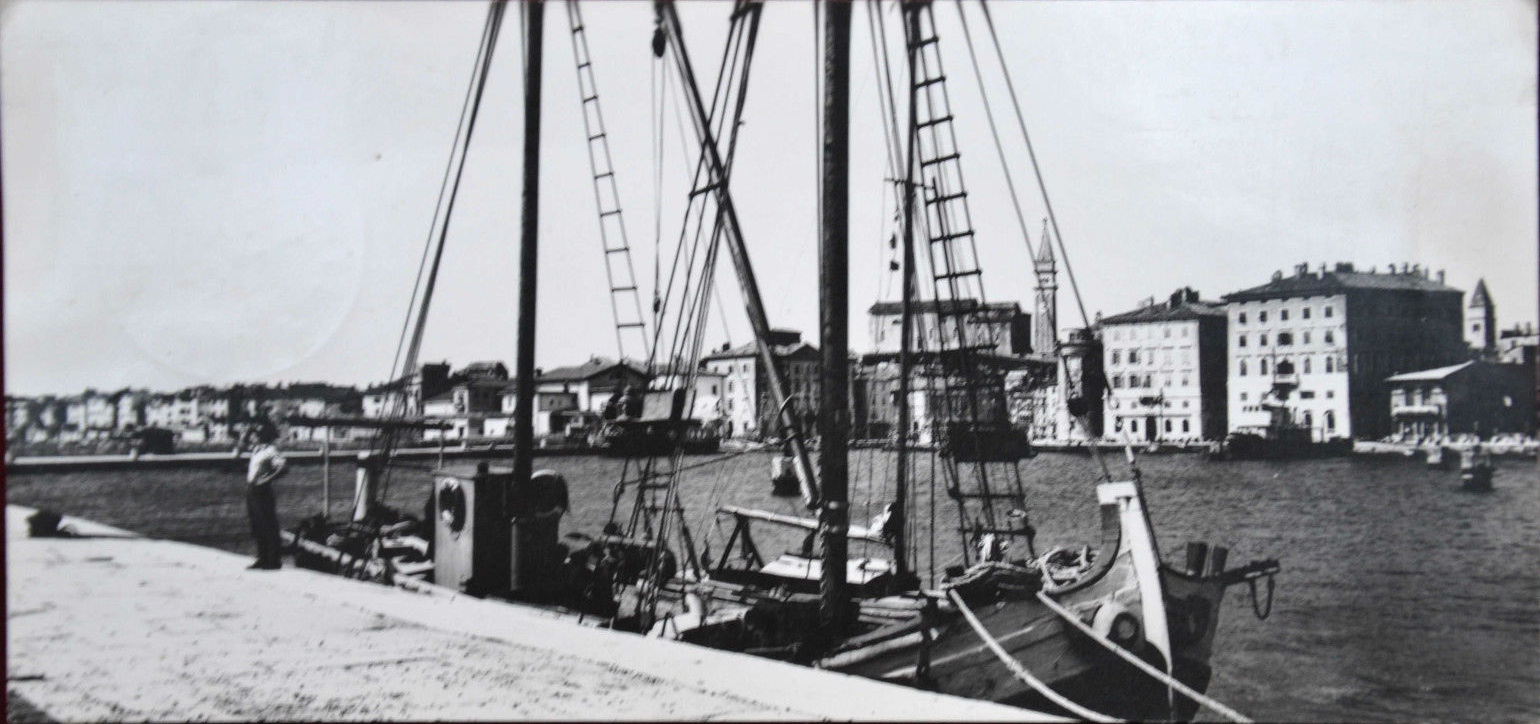
Double masted Istrian bracera in Piran harbour 1962

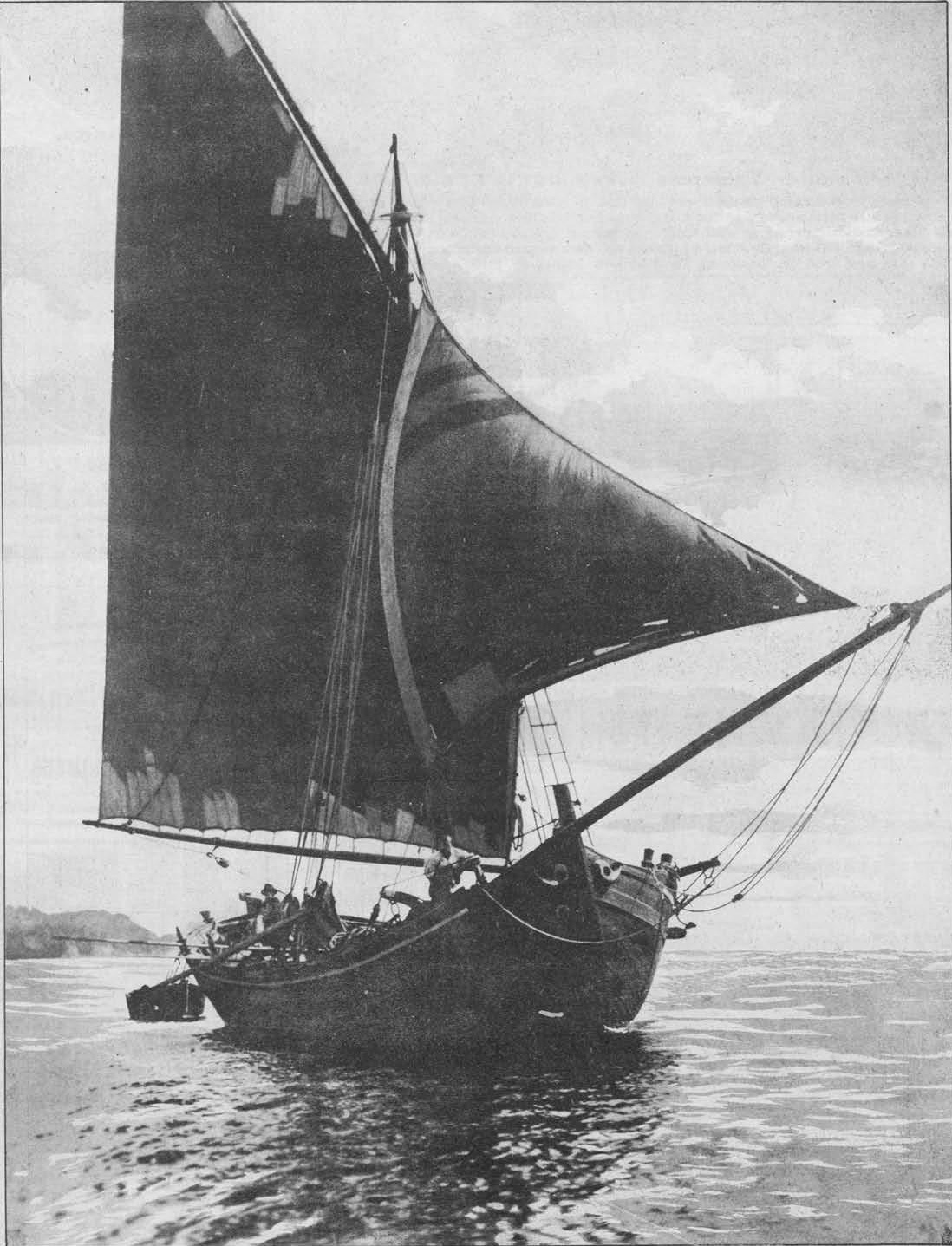
Istrian bracera in 1926

=== Replica of the single masted traditional bracera "Gospa od mora" (eng. "Our Lady of the Sea") ===
Commissioned on Christmas 2005 by The Dolphin Dream Society, bracera "Our Lady of the Sea" was launched in April 2011 and is today sailing Dubrovnik waters as an excursion and educational boat promoting Croatian maritime heritage. The replica was designed by Croatian expert on traditional boat building, professor Velimir Salamon, hand-built in Betina on the island of Murter by a traditional boat shipbuilder Mr. Mile Jadrešić. The vessel’s first captain was Mr. Jadran Gamulin, a maritime authority of some renown. "Our Lady of the Sea" is not a replica of a specific type of bracera in history. The vessel was built as an educational representative of the traditional bracera. Its accuracy is attested by the Croatian Academy of Sciences and Arts. Today, bracera "Our Lady of the Sea" continues to present and promote the maritime tradition of the Adriatic Sea to the general public while sailing Dubrovnik waters.

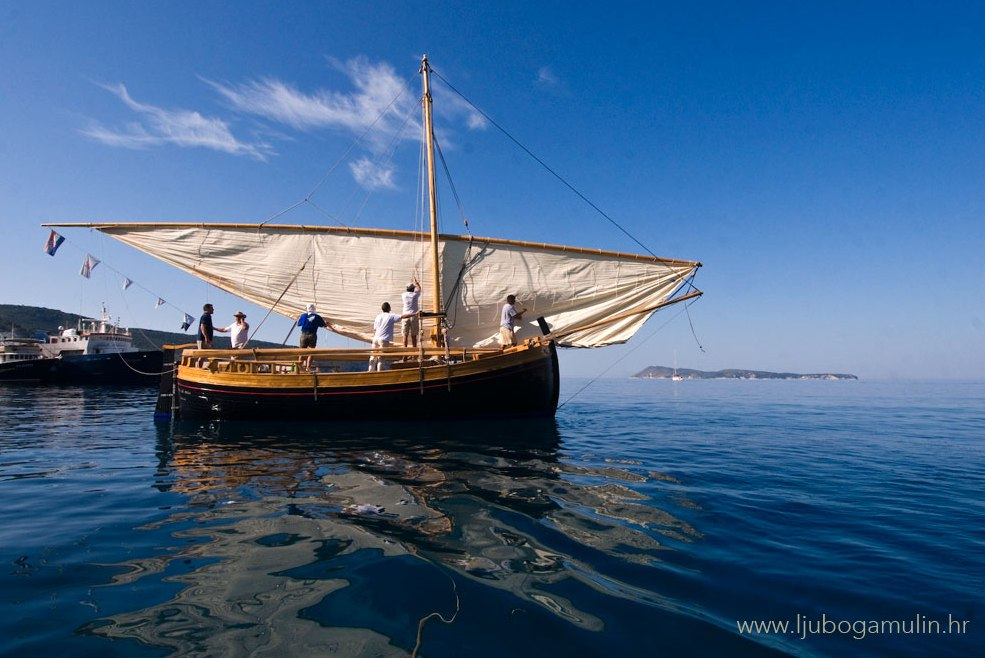
Raising lateen sail on bracera "Our Lady of the Sea"

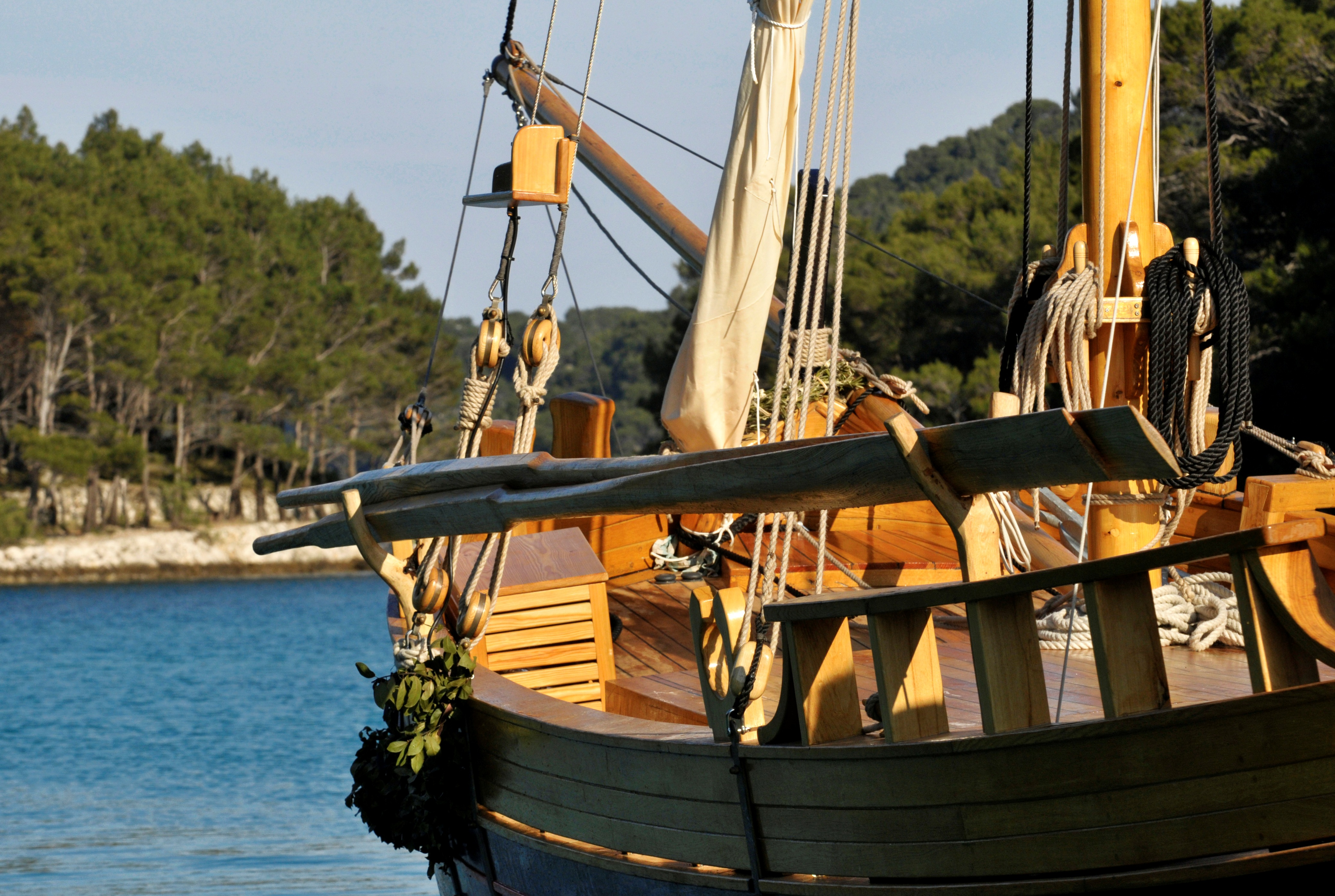
Deck details with a pair of oars

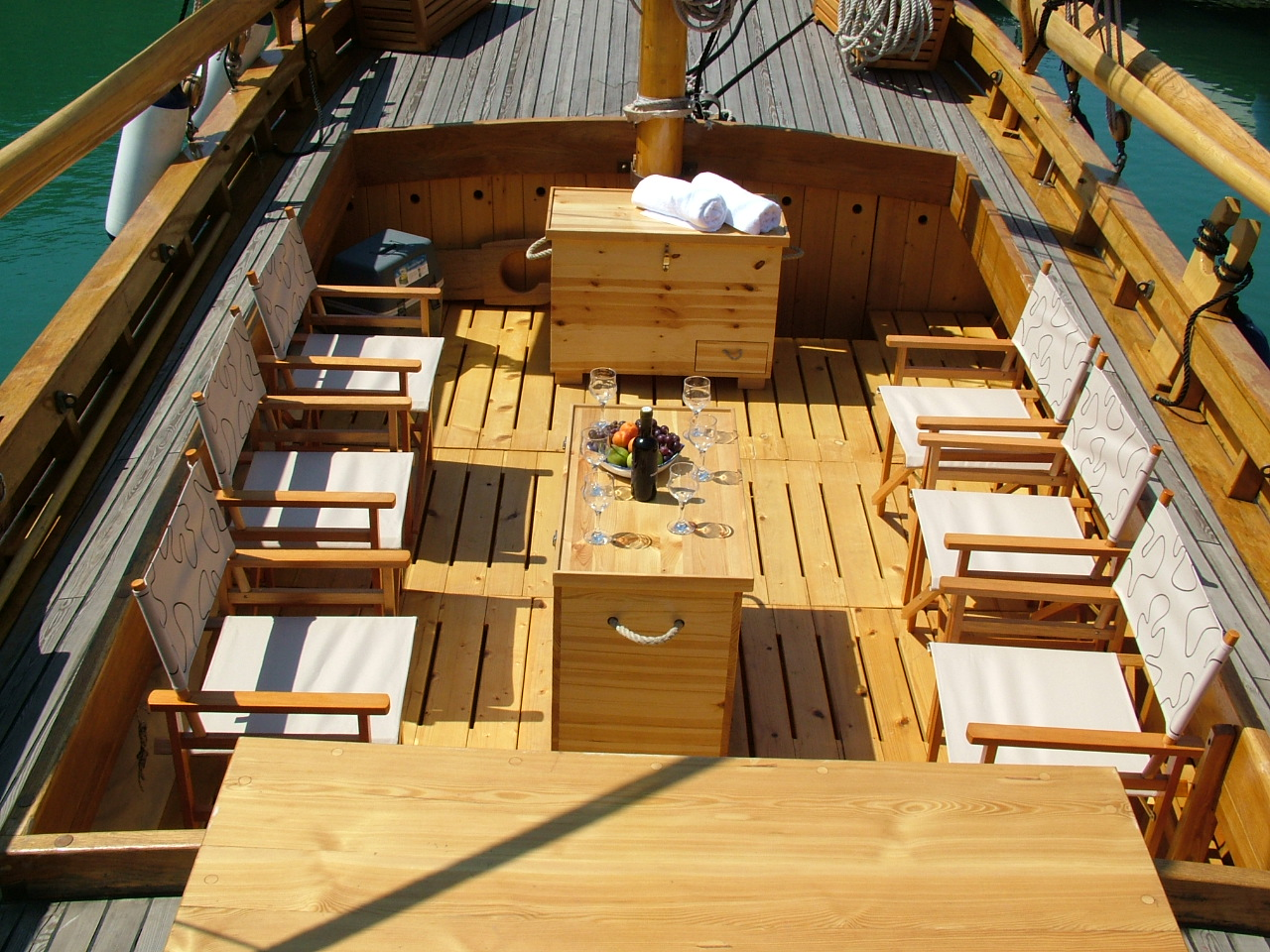
The interior of "Our Lady of the Sea"

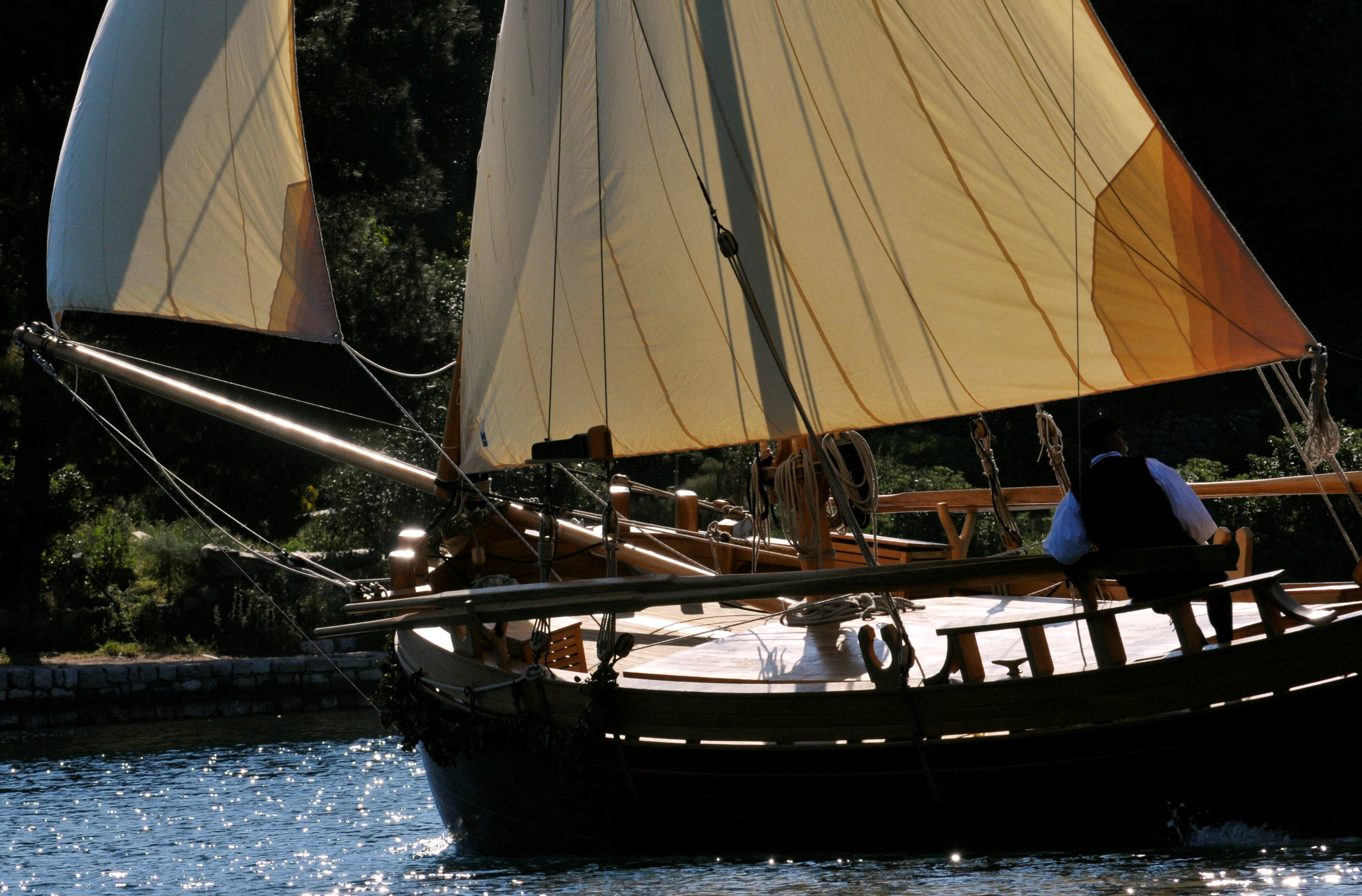
"Our Lady of the sea" sailing on Mljet lake

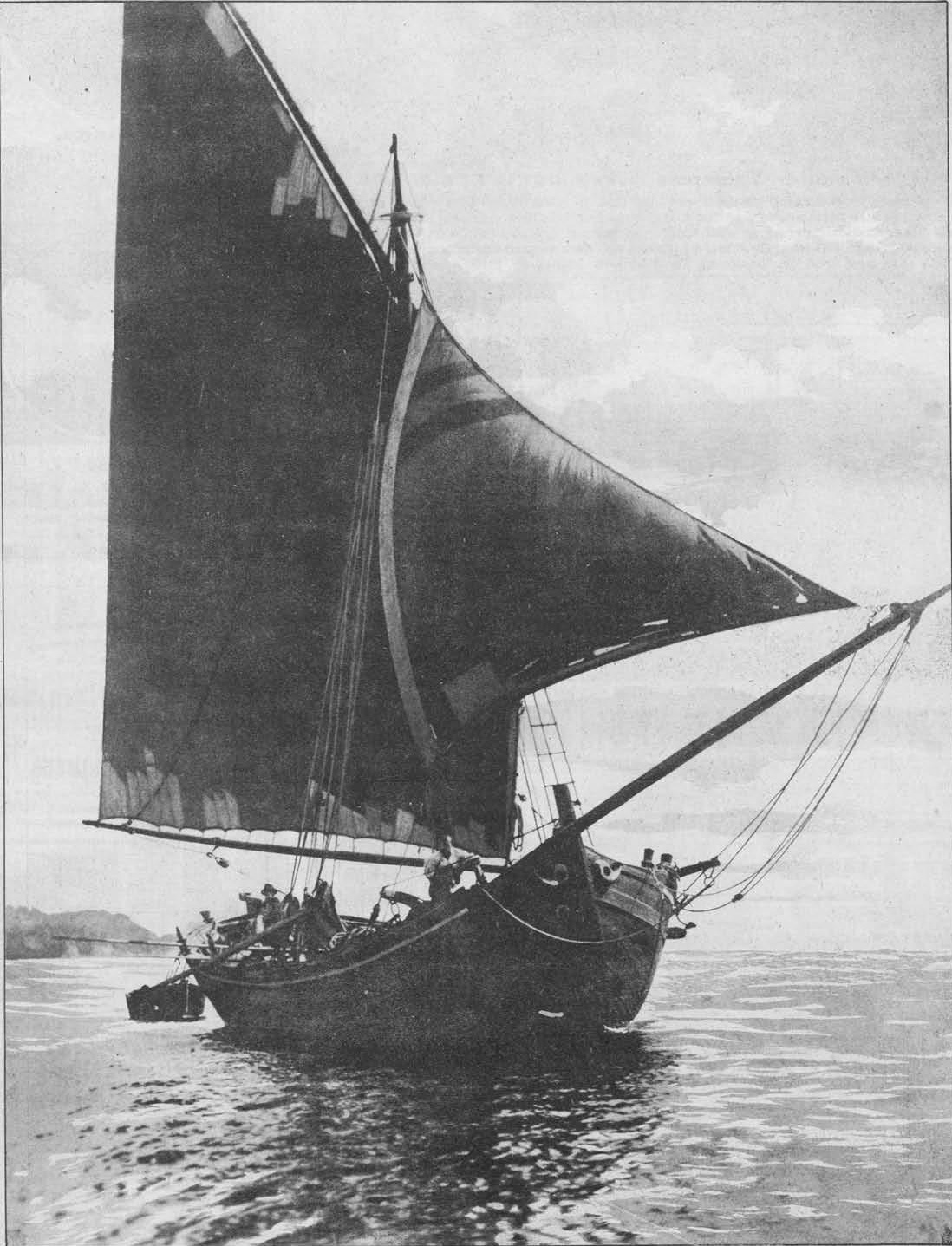
Istrian bracera in 1926

== See also ==
- Bracera "Our Lady of the Sea"
- Boat building
- Falkuša
- Batana
- Trabaccolo
- Dalmatia
- Adriatic Sea
- The Dolphin Dream Society
