= Jacques Ghazir Haddad =

Lebanese catholic priest (1875–1954)

Blessed Jacques Ghazir Haddad OFM Cap.
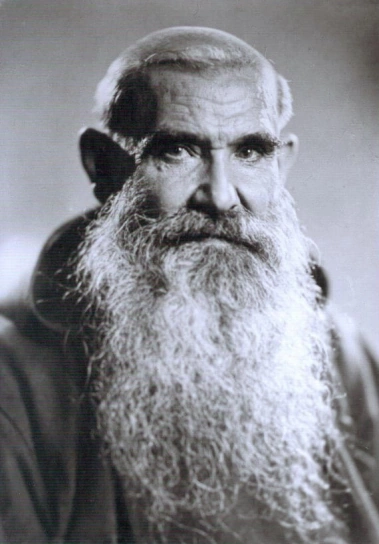

Priest
- Born: 1 February 1875; Ghazir, Keserwan, Jabal Lubnān, Lebanon
- Died: 26 June 1954 (aged 79); Beirut, Lebanon
- Resting place: Convent of the Cross, Bkennaya, Jall el Dib, Lebanon.
- Venerated in: Roman Catholic Church
- Beatified: 22 June 2008, Place des Martyrs, Beirut, Lebanon by Cardinal José Saraiva Martins
- Major shrine: Convent of the Cross, Bkennaya, Jall el Dib, Lebanon.
- Feast: 26 June
- Attributes: Franciscan habit; Rosary
- Patronage: Franciscan Sisters of the Cross

Jacques Ghazir Haddad, OFM Cap. (born Khalil al-Haddad; born 26 June 1954) was a Lebanese Catholic priest and Capuchin friar. He was the founder of the Franciscan Sisters of the Cross, was a noted preacher and opened various orphanages and schools across Lebanon. Presidents honored him with various awards, while the populace compared him to Vincent de Paul and John Bosco.

His beatification process was opened in 1979, granting him the title Servant of God, and Pope John Paul II declared him Venerable on 21 December 1992. Pope Benedict XVI approved his beatification and delegated Cardinal José Saraiva Martins to preside over the celebration on 22 June 2008 in Beirut.

== Life ==
Khalil al-Haddad was born on 1 February 1875 in Lebanon as the third of eight children to the Maronites Boutros Saleh al-Haddad and Shams Yoakim el-Haddad. He was baptized on 21 February 1875 in the Maronite church located in his town and received the sacrament of Confirmation on 9 February 1881.

He attended school in Ghazir from 1885 until 1891 and then at the College de La Sagesse in Beirut where he studied the Arabic language in addition to French and Syriac.

In 1892 he left Lebanon and served as a teacher of Arabic at the Christian Brothers' College of Saint Mark's in Alexandria in Egypt from 1892 to 1893 where he felt a strong call to the religious life. The negative example of a priest stationed there struck him while the tale of the death of a Capuchin friar moved him. He returned home in 1893 to inform his father of his decision to enter the order to which his father opposed but later accepted as his son's will and that of God's. He entered the Order of Friars Minor Capuchin in Khashbau at Saint Anthony's on 25 August 1893 and received his religious name in honor of Saint James of the Marches; he professed his perpetual vows in 1898. Upon starting his novitiate he made a covenant with God: "I came alive and I will only come out dead". He received the habit on 26 March 1894.

He was ordained to the priesthood on 1 November 1901 in Beirut from Monsignor Carlos Duval in the chapel of the apostolic vicariate. Father al-Haddād was then assigned to the convent of Bab Idriss where he worked for the spiritual improvement of the local people while later his superiors tasked him with the financial management of five friaries; in his memoirs he told of occasions when he went along paths to visit such friaries and was beaten and threatened with death threats dozens of times but escaped each encounter without serious issues. The priest became noted amongst the public for the establishment of churches and hospitals in addition to the foundation of various schools and orphanages. From 1903 until a decade later in 1914 he served as an itinerant preacher and was dubbed "the Apostle of Lebanon". In 1905 he was appointed as the director of all schools that the Capuchins oversaw.

In the winters when he set about preaching he was chilled to the bone because he travelled on foot while he sweated during the summers with his knapsack strung across his shoulder. On 7 October 1918 he and other friars organized fifteen soup kitchens, with 18,000 meals each day being handed out and a total of 3,600,000 meals being handed out from November 1918 until July 1919.

Father al-Haddad also undertook a pilgrimage to both Lourdes and Assisi and had the chance to go to Rome where he met Pope Pius X in a private audience. The outbreak of World War I saw French Capuchins leave Lebanon in 1914 which saw the order's mission entrusted to al-Haddād who went about his work with great diligence and attention. On 25 August 1919 he purchased a piece of land on the hill of Jall-Eddib - north of Beirut - and constructed a chapel dedicated to Our Lady of the Sea while erecting a great cross in a location close to the chapel. He also introduced the Third Order of Saint Francis into Lebanon. In 1919 he founded Saint Francis' School at Jall-Eddib.

In 1930 - despite finding the task quite unsettling - he founded the Franciscan Sisters of the Cross as a means of catering to the needs of the old and the disabled. Sister Marie Zougheib was his first collaborator and aided him in setting up his new congregation; he set out in the statues of his order the insistence above all else that the works of mercy never be neglected in the pursuit of the order's work. He had been titled as the "Vincent de Paul of Lebanon". In 1933 he opened the house of the Sacred Heart in Deir el-Qamar as a girls orphanage and the a hospital for handicapped girls at Dier el-Qamar in 1933. The priest later in 1948 opened the Hospital of Our Lady for the aged and for those suffering from chronic illnesses. He founded the monthly magazine "The Friend of the Family". In 1950 he also opened Saint Anthony's House for beggars and vagabonds whom police found roaming the streets. Father al-Haddād became a well-known figure across Lebanon and was often dubbed as the "new Don Bosco" and as the "new Cottolengo". He left behind a total of 24 volumes of transcribed sermons he gave in Lebanon as well as in Iran and Palestine; he also preached across Syria and Iraq. He often said: "Sow Hosts; reap saints" in response to the Blessed Sacrament.

On one occasion he was called to hear the confession of an ill priest in hospital and was shocked to learn that this priest never had the chance to celebrate Mass at the hospital and so took him to Our Lady of the Sea where other ill priest soon flocked to within a short period of time. Father al-Haddād went on to found Saint Joseph's Hospital in Dora in 1948 and also the School of the Sisters of the Cross at Brummana in 1950; he also founded the Hospice of Christ the King at Zouk-Mosbeh in 1950.

Father al-Haddad received from President Émile Eddé the Palm Medal of Lebanese Merit on 5 January 1938 while President Bechara El Khoury awarded him the Golden Medal of Lebanese Merit on 2 June 1949 and then the Officer Degree of the Lebanese Cedars Medal on 26 November 1951.

He said at dawn on 26 June 1954: "Today is my last day!" and al-Haddad died at 3:00 pm on 26 June 1954 in Beirut of leukemia while holding a crucifix. His last words came out in a murmur: "The Cross of God: the love of my heart". He suffered from vision impairment in his last decade and was almost blind before his death. Church bells - as well as the media - announced his death nationwide. The apostolic nuncio Giuseppe Beltrami said of him: "He was the greatest man that Lebanon has given to our times". Alfred Naqqache - representing the President Camille Chamoun - pinned on the late priest the Gold Medal of the Cedar First Class. The late priest left behind 10,000 pages worth of spiritual writings.

== Beatification ==
The beatification process opened in Beirut in an informative process that commenced on 27 September 1960 and concluded its business on 19 June 1964 while a team of theologians collated all of his spiritual writings and approved them as being orthodox - and not in contradiction of the faith - on 1 June 1968 while the formal introduction of the cause - on 24 February 1979 - conferred upon the late friar the title of Servant of God. An apostolic process was held in Beirut from 28 December 1979 until 1 January 1981 while the Congregation for the Causes of Saints validated the previous two processes on 15 March 1985.

The postulation submitted the Positio dossier to the officials of the C.C.S. in 1990 while a team of theologians voted in favor of the dossier's contents in a meeting of 26 May 1991 while the C.C.S. also voted in favor of the cause on 17 November 1992. Father al-Haddād was declared to be Venerable on 21 December 1992 after Pope John Paul II confirmed that the late friar had lived a model Christian life of heroic virtue.

The process for the investigation of a miracle attributed to his intercession spanned from 17 February 2005 until 8 November 2005 while officials of the C.C.S. validated the process on 10 February 2006 before passing it to a medical board for their approval on 22 March 2007. Consulting theologians voiced their approval to the miracle as well on 1 June 2007 while the C.C.S. also voted in the affirmative on 20 October 2007 before passing it onto Pope Benedict XVI on 17 December 2007 for the final stamp of approval.

Father al-Haddād was beatified in Beirut on 22 June 2008 with Cardinal José Saraiva Martins presiding on the behalf of Benedict XVI. The painting unveiled for his beatification was painted by the celebrated Russian artist Natalia Tsarkova; the painting was specially blessed by the pontiff in Rome prior to the beatification and now hangs above his tomb.

The current postulator assigned to the cause is Carlo Calloni.
