= D121 =

D121 may refer to:

- D121 road (Croatia), a state road connecting the island of Murter with D8 state road near Pirovac
- Jodel D.121, an aircraft
