= The Dolphin Dream Society =

- Formation: 2001 Zagreb, Croatia
- Type: Non-governmental organization
- Purpose: Preservation of natural and cultural heritage of the Adriatic region
- Headquarters: Dubrovnik, Croatia
- Region served: Adriatic region
- President: Goran Stojanović
- Main organ: Executive board, elected by the general gssembly of the society
- Website: www.dupinovsan.org
- Remarks: See article for more details on formation.

The Dolphin Dream Society is a Croatian non-governmental and nonprofit organization founded in Zagreb in May 2001 with the intent to promote environmental awareness, environmental protection and maritime heritage as well as sustainable development of the Adriatic Sea, coast and islands. The association was founded by a group of enthusiasts inspired by the "Dolphin Dream", a novel by Adrian Predrag Kezele who was also named association's honorary president.

== Project activities ==
In its previous work the association has implemented a number of project activities with the program "Support the Adriatic Colours" (2003 - 2011) and its three projects: The Blue, The Green and The White having a special place and importance.

As part of The Blue project 15 cleanup of the shore and seabed actions were implemented with 30 tons of waste pulled out from the Adriatic Sea. These actions were accompanied by the national campaign to promote the protection of the Adriatic Sea called "Support the color of the Adriatic - Preserve the Blue, and the systematic development of the educational study ALTEA targeting Croatian high school students.

Project The Green was designed as a national donation campaign "Plant a Life!" aiming to strengthen social consciousness and responsibility and collect donations for the restoration of (pine and cypress) forests of the Adriatic region, and planting olive trees on preselected locations along the Adriatic coast and its islands. On locations along the Adriatic coast (from Istria to Dubrovnik), in cooperation with many partners 20 00 seedlings of pines and cypresses, and 7000 seedlings of olive trees were planted.

Project The White aimed at conserving Croatia traditional shipbuilding and promoting environmental awareness and sustainable development. The national campaign from 2006 "Loving means conserving! warned the public of the need to preserve the natural and cultural heritage of the Adriatic region, its shoreline and islands as a protected entity with preserved biodiversity. As part of the project, in Spring 2011 in Betina on the island of Murter, The Dolphin Dream Society launched a replica of traditional bracera from the 18th century with a white lateen sail named "Our Lady of the Sea" (Croatian: Gospa od mora).

Today, following The White project, The Dolphin Dream Society is running the Maritima Art program - maritime heritage in responsible tourism. The program formed a comprehensive tourist offer based on a traditional boat, as well as an educational program in order to preserve skills of traditional sailing with the lateen sail.

== See also ==
- Bracera
- Bracera "Our Lady of the Sea"
- Croatia
- Adriatic Sea
