= Tunnels on Raduč =

Complex of military underground tunnels in Murter, Croatia

The Tunnels on Raduč are a complex of World War Two military underground tunnels dug deep in the hill Raduč, Murter.

Tunnels on Raduč.

== Use ==
During World War II, the tunnels were used as a military hiding spot. The bunker had three cannons that were supposed to defend Murter and that part of the Croatian coast) from Italian warships.

== Today ==
The tunnels are a popular tourist destination. They are not lighted, so tourists need to bring flashlights. Around 20% of them are inaccessible, since the deepest parts were accessible only by ladders that have collapsed.
