= Falkuša =

Traditional Croatian fishing boat

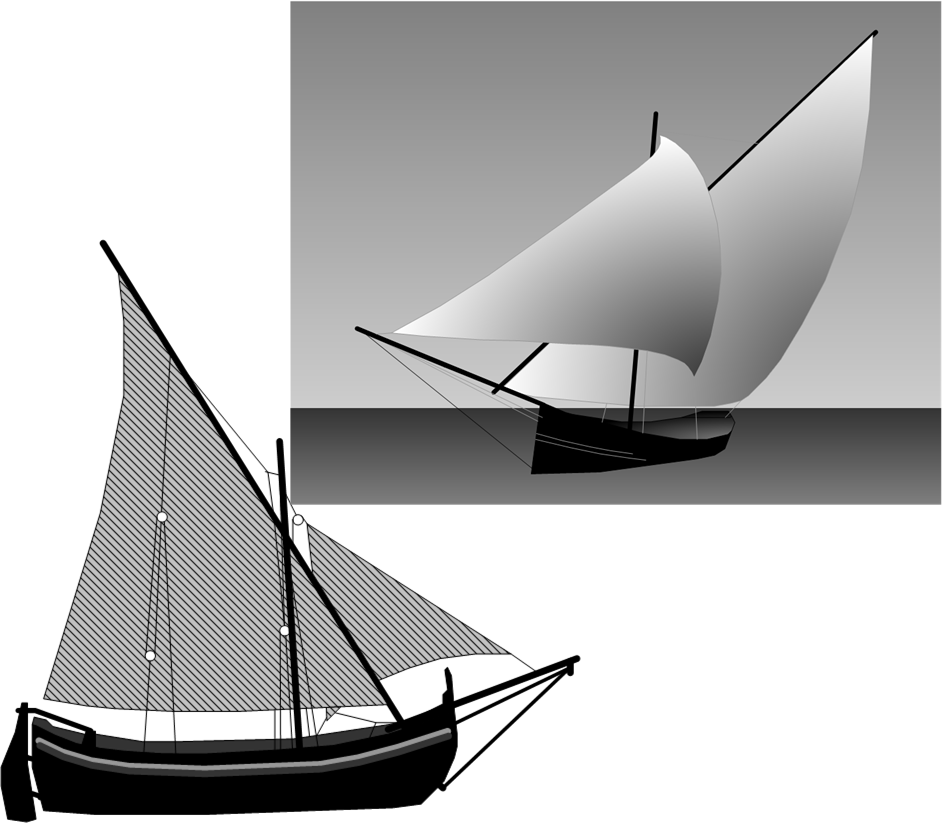
Falkuša

A falkusa (Croatian: falkuša; Croatian pronunciation: [ˈfalkuʃa]) is a traditional fishing boat used by fishermen from the town of Komiža on the Adriatic island of Vis, Croatia. Falkuša is a subtype of gajeta, a traditional Dalmatian fishing sailboat, and is sometimes called gajeta falkuša (Croatian pronunciation: [ˈɡajeta ˈfalkuʃa]). Its design was adapted to the specific needs of Komiža fishermen, who went to long fishing expeditions in the open seas, a unique practice in the Adriatic and Mediterranean.

== Design and construction ==
The lateen sail was used on the Falkuša

The Falkuša is a unique wooden boat, tapered narrowly on both sides, and is about seven to eight metres in length by 3 metres wide. It had a low draft under a large (120 m^{2} or 1,300 sq ft) lateen sail made from flax, mounted on a mast which was typically as high as the ship was long. It was very fast both under sail and with oar, able to achieve speeds between 8 and 12 knots. Its distinctive feature were two removable wooden side strakes called falke, after which falkuša got its name. The strakes raised the rim of the boat by about half a metre, protecting it from high waves in the open seas. To ease the hauling of the nets, the strakes were removed during fishing. The vessel could carry up to eight tonnes of salted fish barrels.

For its characteristics of toughness and strength, the traditional gajeta falkuša was made only with cypress wood from the volcanic island of Svetac. The keel was made of oak and the shell of larch.

A typical falkuša carried a crew of six men. There were five oars for standing oarsmen which were 7 to 9 meters in length. The fishermen used nets and a feral, a gas or petroleum lamp for attracting fish. Fishing trips lasted 20 to 25 days, to make them financially viable. Duties such as cooking, washing, repairing, sailing between fishing posts and dealing with bad weather left only 10 to 12 days for actual fishing in a typical journey.

== Fishermen's regatta ==
The main fishing ground exploited by Komiža's fishermen was the island of Palagruža, approximately 42 nautical miles (78 km; 48 mi) to the south-southwest of Vis, which at times was used by fifty or more vessels. On the island there were provisional houses, which they used to store barrels of salted sardines and fishing equipment.

Fishermen of Komiža would hold an annual regatta between Komiža and Palagruža, known as Rota Palagruzona ("Palagruža Route"), a trip which would take about 5 hours of sailing with a good wind, or 13 to 16 hours of rowing when wind conditions were poor. The outcome of the regatta was very important, because top finishers won the rights to the best fishing areas around Palagruža for the season, and the other places were taken in the order of arrival.

The first known regatta to Palagruža was held as far back as 1593 making it the oldest fishermen's regatta in Europe. Komiža's fishermen met in May 1593 in the Lodge in the town of Hvar. There it was agreed that the race of 74 falkuša boats would start on June 12. To signal the start of the race a cannon shot would be fired from the newly built town fortress. The fishermen were accompanied by Venetian war galleys in order to protect them from pirates.

With the advent of ship engines, the regatta lost its purpose, and its last edition was held in 1936. Falkuša was used well into the first half of the 20th century. The last gajeta falkuša of the island of Komiža, named Cicibela, was destroyed and sunk by a storm in the Bay of Porat (Biševo island) in 1986. Today its remains are preserved in the Fishing Museum in Komiža.

== Replicas ==
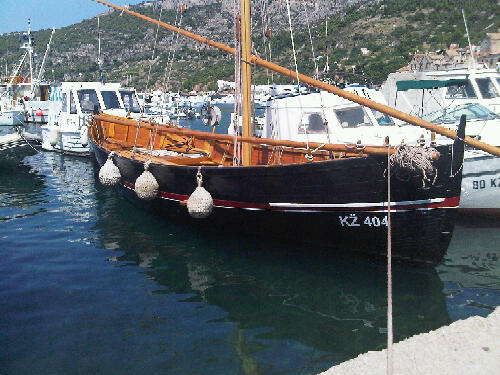
Mikula, the second full-scale replica, was finished in 2005.

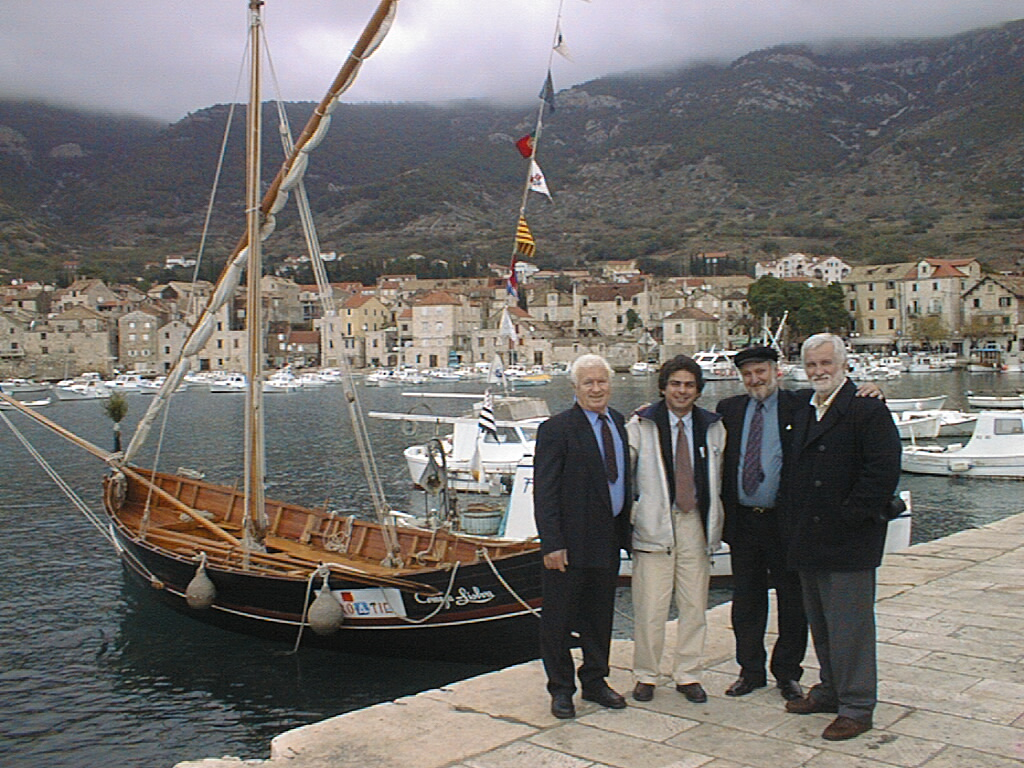
Falkuša Comeza-Lisboa with its crew and owners in Komiža, December 7, 2003

A replica of a falkuša named Comeza-Lisboa ("Komiža-Lisbon") was built in 1997 and exhibited at the 1998 World’s Fair in Lisbon, Portugal. The revival of the falkuša attracted significant interest, and the boat became the subject of five documentary films and an award-winning radio drama. In 1998 the falkuša was put on the UNESCO World Heritage List.

In 1999 under UNESCO and with shipwright's documentation supplied by Velimir Salamon, a five-metre reduced-scale replica of the legendary falkuša was built. It was named Molo. It was built in Komiža and launched into the sea on Saint Nicholas Day (December 6). The secretary of the European Maritime Heritage, Thedo Fruithof from Amsterdam, was present at the launch. A second full-scale replica, named Mikula, was finished in 2005. A third full-scale replica, named Palagruža, was finished in 2015.

== See also ==
- Boat building
- Traditional fishing boats
- Komiža
- Palagruža
- Bracera
