= Kašić =

Kašić (pronounced [kǎʃitɕ]) is a surname. Notable people with the surname include:

- Bartol Kašić (1575–1650), Croatian Jesuit clergyman and grammarian
- Mladen Kašić (born 1958), Croatian volleyball player
