= Murter-Kornati =

- Municipality
- Općina Murter-Kornati; Municipality of Murter-Kornati
- Interactive map of Murter-Kornati
- Location of Murter-Kornati within Croatia
- Coordinates: 43.82°N 15.592°E
- Country: Croatia
- Region: Dalmatia
- County: Šibenik-Knin County

Government
  - Mayor: Šime Ježina

Area
  - Total: 78.7 km^{2} (30.4 sq mi)

Population (2021)
  - Total: 1,934
  - Density: 24.6/km^{2} (63.6/sq mi)
- Time zone: UTC+1
  - Summer (DST): UTC+2
- Postal code: 22243 Murter
- Vehicle registration: ŠI
- Website: murter.hr

Murter-Kornati is a municipality in central Dalmatia, Croatia. It is named after the two settlements that it consists of: Murter, located on the eponymous island, which it shares with Tisno, and Kornati which consists of the eponymous archipelago.

== Population ==
In the 2011 census, the population of the municipality was 2,044, the overwhelming majority (97.65%) of them being ethnic Croats.

In 2021, the municipality consisted of the following two settlements:

- Kornati, population 14
- Murter, population 1920
Municipality of Murter-Kornati: Population trends 1857–2021
v

population	1084		1307	1452	1681	1986	2150	2502	2213	2295	2061	2164	1846	2013	2075	2044	1934
	1857	1869	1880	1890	1900	1910	1921	1931	1948	1953	1961	1971	1981	1991	2001	2011	2021

Sources: Croatian Bureau of Statistics publications

== Geography ==
The settlement of Murter spans the following areas:

- Hramina cove, where a marina has been built, protected from all winds, making it a safe shelter for yachts.
- Slanica cove, which features a sandy beach, as well as an auto camp and a hotel ("Colentum")
- The old part of the Murter, called "Selo" (the Village), located near the Raduč hill and closer to the island's interior.

Due to Murter residents' growing concentration on the sea, the newer part of Murter was built on the coast of Hramina.
