= Jezera, Tisno =

Coordinates: 43°47′09″N 15°38′37″E

Jezera
- Settlement
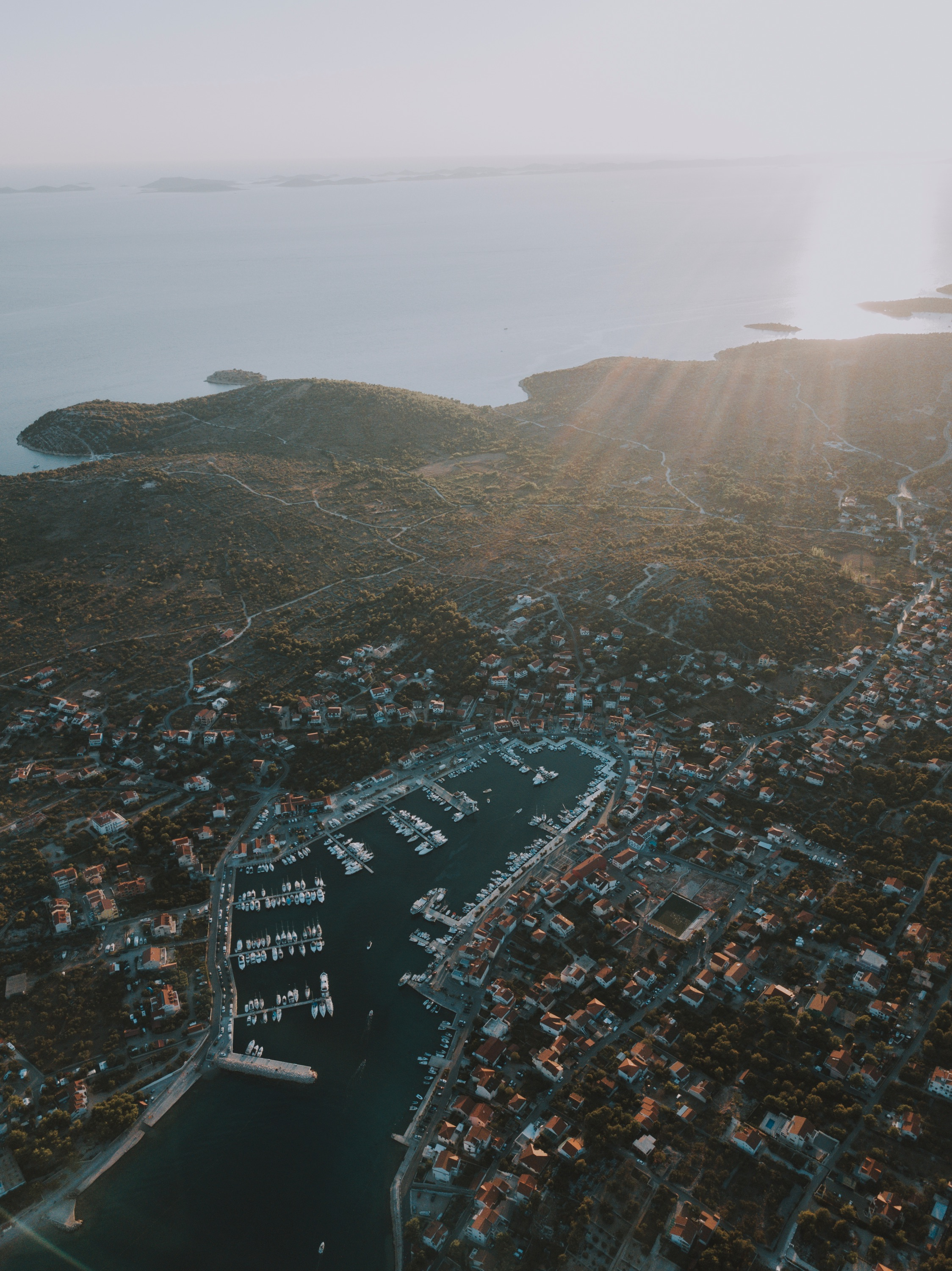
- aerial view of Jezera (2017)
- Interactive map of Jezera
- Country: Croatia
- County: Šibenik-Knin County
- Municipality: Tisno

Area
  - Total: 8.9 km^{2} (3.4 sq mi)

Population (2021)
  - Total: 798
  - Density: 90/km^{2} (230/sq mi)
- Time zone: UTC+1 (CET)
  - Summer (DST): UTC+2 (CEST)

Jezera is a settlement in Croatia located on the island of Murter. Situated in the northern Dalmatia region along the central Adriatic coast, it forms part of Tisno municipality.

It is the second-largest settlement in the municipality after Tisno, and a major tourist destination in summer, known for its stunning coastline and vibrant local culture. The town attracts visitors interested in both leisure and cultural activities, and experiences a significant population surge during the summer months.

The name Jezera translates to 'lakes' in English, reflecting the area's natural landscape and proximity to bodies of water.

Jezera has a natural harbour protected from frequent Adriatic winds such as jugo or bora.
