= Ivinj archeological site =

Archaeological site with Roman ruins, Croatia

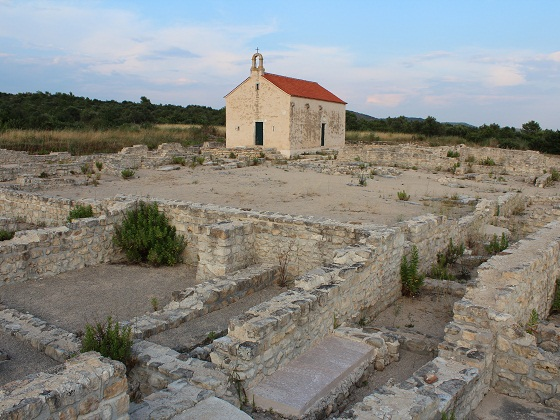
- The Ivinj archeological site, with Saint Martin's Church
- Interactive map of Ivinj archeological site
- 43.80076°N 15.68386°E
- Type: Archeological site
- Periods: 1st Century AD
- Location: Pirovac
- Region: Dalmatia

Designations
- Designation: Protected cultural monument

The Ivinj archeological site is an archeological site near Pirovac, Dalmatia. The site was recognized as a cultural heritage site on 20 July 2012. It was awarded the status of a protected cultural monument by the Ministry of Culture of Croatia.

The site encompasses a Roman Villa, Basilica, a baptistery, and the Church of Saint Martin.

== Roman villa ==
The remnants of a Roman villa in Ivinj date back to the first century AD. The villa was built by an unknown immigrant who moved to Ivinj after the Batonian uprising had ended. At the beginning of the 1st century, they constructed a building that had both residential and economic functions. Through later modifications, this building grew into a large rustic villa.

It featured its own inner courtyard, oil production areas, storage rooms and quarters for the workers. A separate, luxuriously furnished section of the villa was used by the owner. Remnants of a mosaic found in the villa support the appraisal of a luxurious lifestyle. The artifacts are on permanent exhibit in the Katunarić Palace in Tisno.

== Basilica and baptistery ==
In the 5th century, a basilica was added to the villa. A baptistery was added in the 6th century.

== Church of Saint Martin ==
In the Middle Ages, the Church of Saint Martin was built by Croats on the land of the Villa Rustica. This church has been preserved through the centuries, and Holy Mass is held there every year on 11 November. The Church of Saint Martin in Ivinj provides evidence of the cult of Saint Martin in Dalmatia for the period of the 6th to the 11th century.

From the 12th century onwards, people were buried at the Church of Saint Martin along with the jewelry that they had worn during their lives.
