= Tisno =

- Municipality
- Općina Tisno; Municipality of Tisno
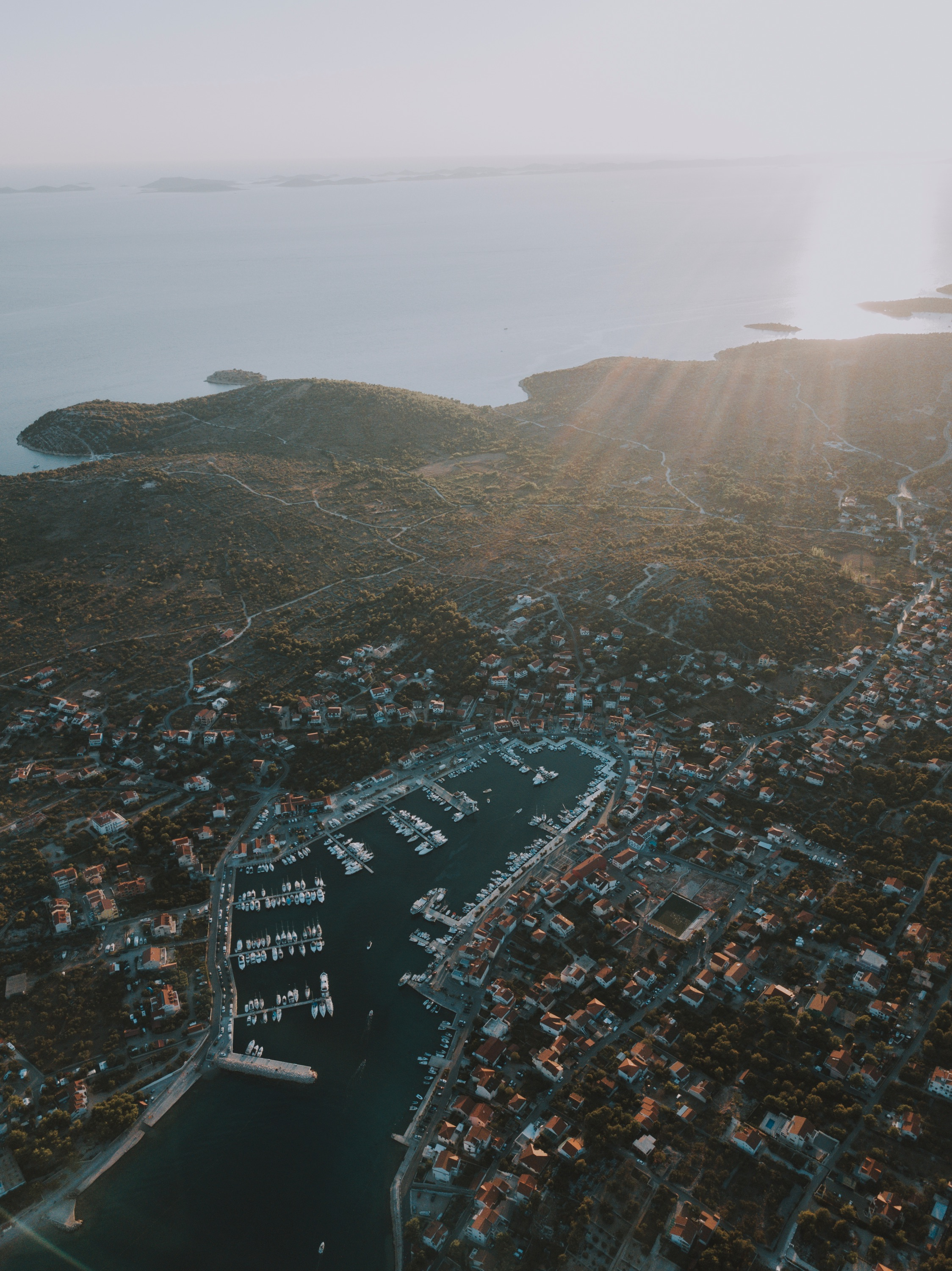
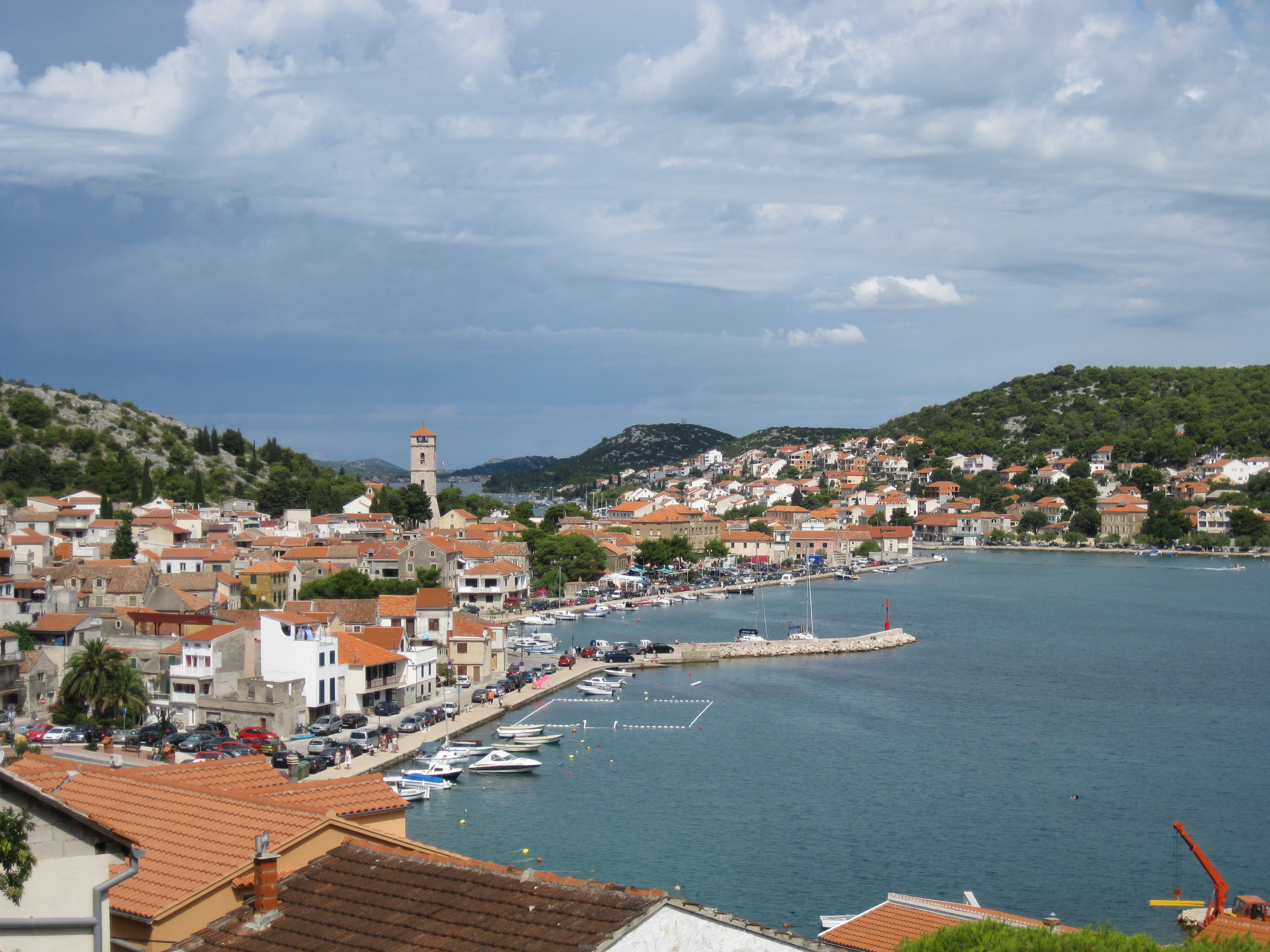
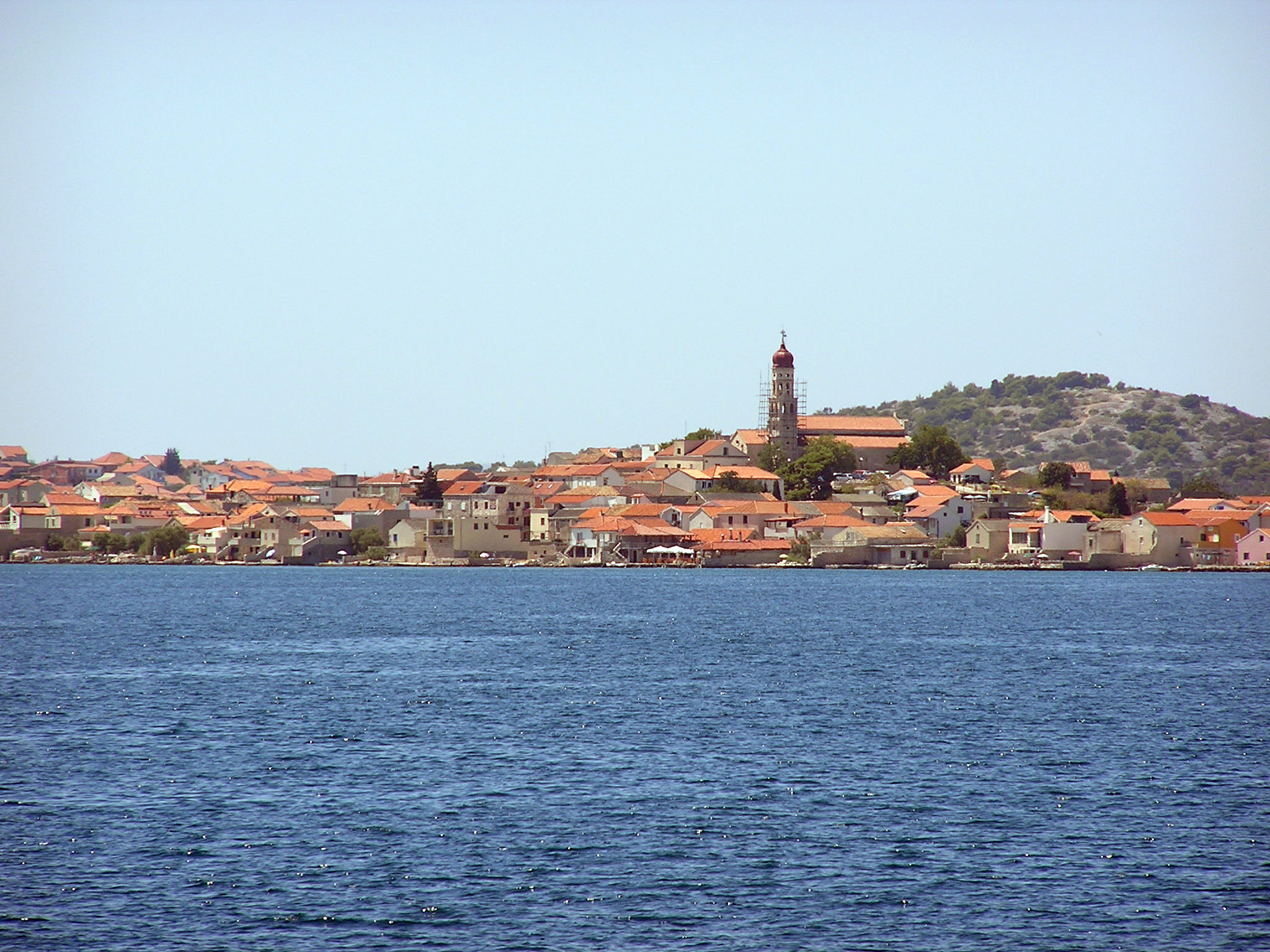
- Three settlements of which the municipality consists: Jezera, Tisno and Betina.
- Interactive map of Tisno
- Location within Croatia
- Coordinates: 43°48′N 15°39′E
- Country: Croatia
- Region: Dalmatia
- County: Šibenik-Knin County

Government
  - Mayor: Antonio Štrkalj (SDP)

Area
  - Municipality: 66.7 km^{2} (25.8 sq mi)
  - Urban: 19.2 km^{2} (7.4 sq mi)

Population (2021)
  - Municipality: 2,908
  - Density: 43.6/km^{2} (113/sq mi)
  - Urban: 1,192
  - Urban density: 62.1/km^{2} (161/sq mi)
- Time zone: UTC+1 (CET)
  - Summer (DST): UTC+2 (CEST)
- Postal code: 22240 Tisno
- Website: tisno.hr

Tisno is a settlement and a municipality in Šibenik-Knin County, in southern Croatia.

== Etymology ==
Tisno was named after the Croatian ikavian word tisno which means strait, which describes its location at the narrow strait separating the island of Murter from the mainland.

The municipality extends both to several other villages on the island as well as several nearby villages inland.

== Demographics ==
In 2021, the municipality had 2,908 residents in the following settlements:

- Betina, population 718
- Dazlina, population 46
- Dubrava kod Tisna, population 154
- Jezera, population 798
- Tisno, population 1,192
Tisno: Population trends 1857–2021
v

| population | 2539 | 4055 | 3007 | 3412 | 3739 | 3999 | 4229 | 4345 | 4187 | 4120 | 3825 | 3808 | 3030 | 3374 | 3239 | 3094 | 2908 |
| | 1857 | 1869 | 1880 | 1890 | 1900 | 1910 | 1921 | 1931 | 1948 | 1953 | 1961 | 1971 | 1981 | 1991 | 2001 | 2011 | 2021 |

Sources: Croatian Bureau of Statistics publications

95.98% of the population are Croats.

== History ==
Tisno was first mentioned in 1474 during the Turkish invasion and during the war against the Venetians when numerous refugees fled to Tisno to seek shelter.

Tisno has a memorial-site dedicated to the several hundred Croatian civilians killed and dropped into a local pit in the aftermath of World War II by the communist Yugoslav regime.

Tisno was referred to as Tijesno up to the census of 1981.

== Geography ==
- Gračina Viewpoint

== Heritage ==
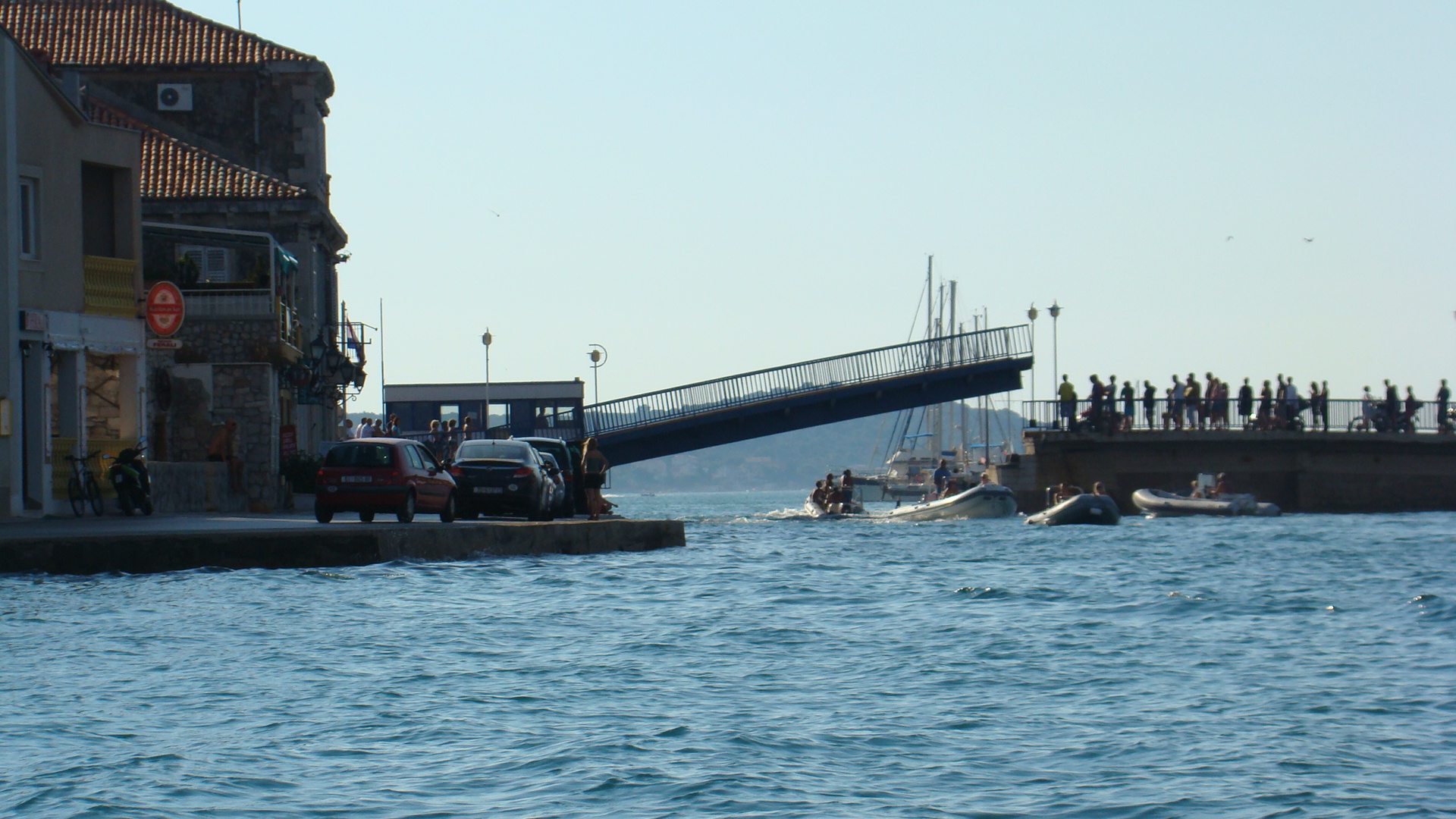
Opening the bridge in Tisno.

Many historical sites tell us about the settlement of this area. The remnants of a Roman villa in Ivinj date back to the 1st AD. The site was awarded the status of a protected cultural monument.

The parish church of St.Spirit's from 1548 was renewed in baroque style in 1640 and enlarged in 1840. The church tower was built in 1684 by the local architects. The church of Our Lady of Caravaggio is a votive church of the Italian family of Gelpis built at the beginning of the 18th century. Each year on 26 May, thousands of pilgrims come from all over the world.

== Culture ==
The nearby area known as The Garden is host to a number of yearly electronic music festivals- such as Love International, Electric Elephant, Stopmakingsense, Defected in the House Croatia, Soundwave and Dekmantel Selectors - featuring an array of established House and Techno DJs .

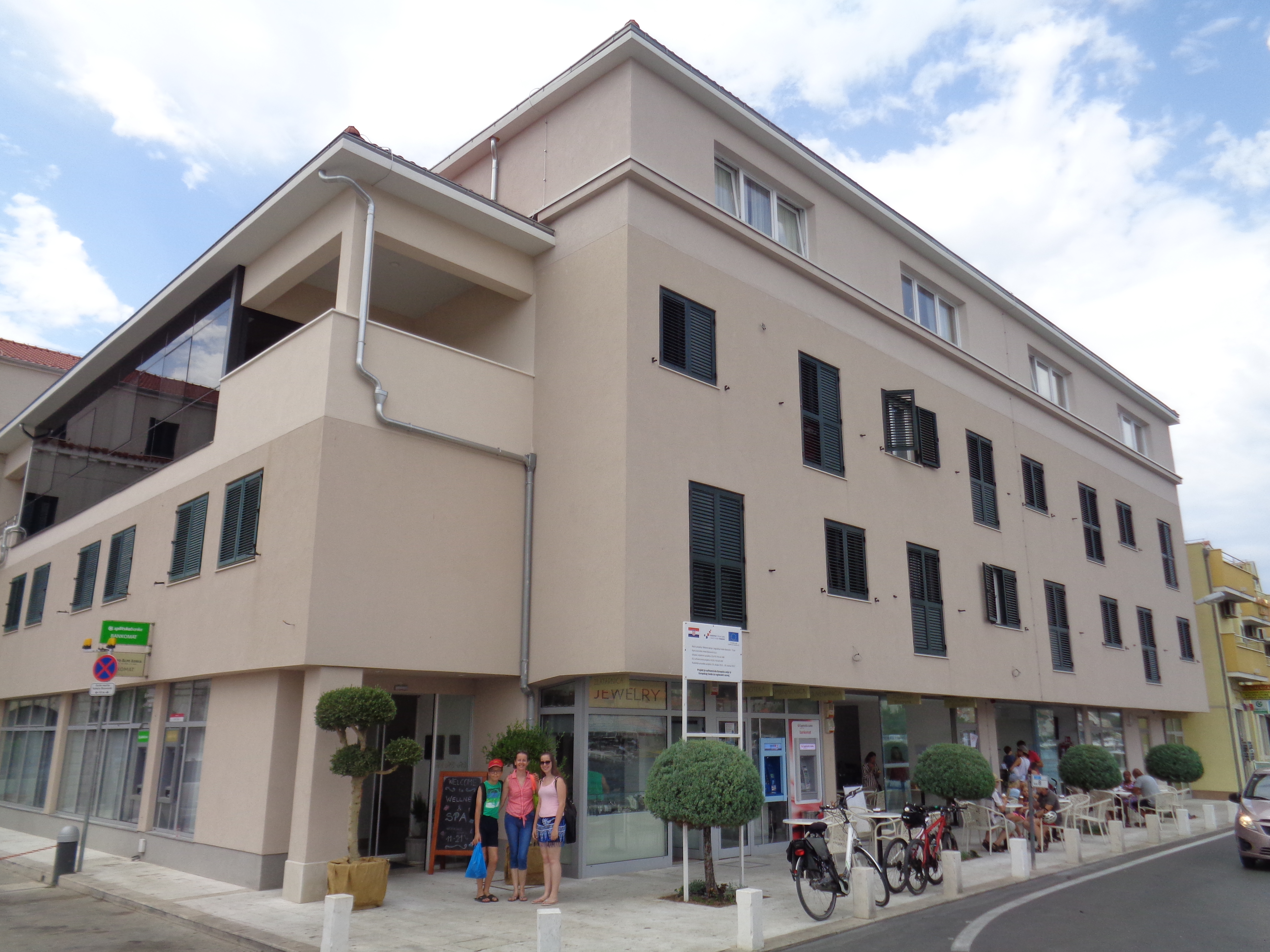
"Borovik" Hotel in Tisno
