= Pirovac =

- Municipality
- Općina Pirovac; Municipality of Pirovac
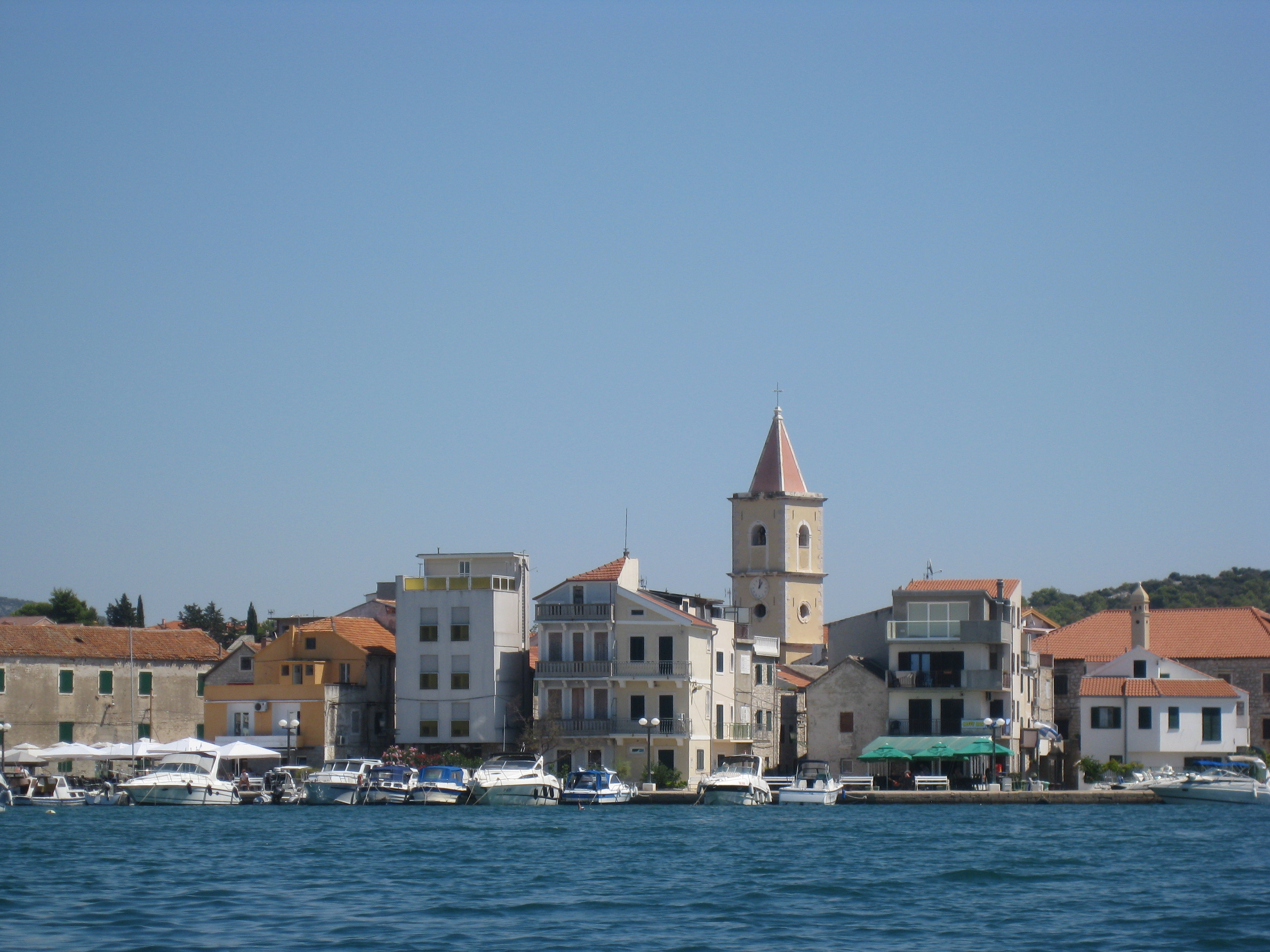
- Interactive map of Pirovac
- Location within Croatia
- Coordinates: 43°49′N 15°40′E
- Country: Croatia
- Region: Dalmatia
- County: Šibenik-Knin County

Government
  - Mayor: Ivan Gulam (Fokus)

Area
  - Municipality: 39.1 km^{2} (15.1 sq mi)
  - Urban: 25.1 km^{2} (9.7 sq mi)

Population (2021)
  - Municipality: 1,606
  - Density: 41.1/km^{2} (106/sq mi)
  - Urban: 1,434
  - Urban density: 57.1/km^{2} (148/sq mi)
- Time zone: UTC+1 (CET)
  - Summer (DST): UTC+2 (CEST)
- Postal code: 22213 Pirovac
- Website: pirovac.hr

Pirovac is a coastal municipality and a settlement in Croatia, 26 km away from the city of Šibenik.

== Demographics ==
In 2021, the municipality had 1,606 residents in the following settlements:

- Kašić, population 104
- Pirovac, population 1,434
- Putičanje, population 68
Pirovac: Population trends 1857–2021
v

population	784	823	986	1207	1391	1646	1615	2120	1994	2049	1991	1936	1807	1785	1846	1930	1606
	1857	1869	1880	1890	1900	1910	1921	1931	1948	1953	1961	1971	1981	1991	2001	2011	2021

Sources: Croatian Bureau of Statistics publications

In 2011, 93% of the population were Croats.

== History ==
The first historical mention of Pirovac was in 1298, under the name "Zlosela". At that time, the village belonged to noblemen from Bribir — the Šubić family, and later it became the property of the Šibenik Diocese and noblemen from Šibenik.

The settlement itself was founded in the 15th century by refugees who fled from the Turks. Nevertheless, this area was inhabited many centuries earlier, as shown by remnants of Roman settlements found on the islet of Sveti Stjepan (St. Stephen). Many other historical monuments tell us about the gradual settlement and development of this place. The remnants of a Roman villa in Ivinj date back to the 1st AD. The site was proclaimed a cultural good in 2012 and awarded the status of a protected cultural monument.

The defence wall, erected around 1505 by Petar Draganić, has been partly preserved in the village. The 1506 parish church of St. George was restored in Baroque style in the 18th century. The graveyard chapel of the Draganić-Vrančić family features a Gothic sarcophagus with a relief made in 1447 by Andrija Budčić from Šibenik and Lorenzo Pincino from Venice, according to the sketches by Giorgio da Sebenico (George the Dalmatian). Roman artifacts have been found on the islet of Sveti Stjepan in front of the village; here also are the ruins of a Franciscan monastery (from 1511), which was abandoned in 1807.

By the mid-17th century, there were 25 houses in the village. The number of inhabitants rose from 273 in 1709 to 1970 in 1931. The first school was opened in 1885. The settlement's name was changed from Zlosela to Pirovac in 1921.

The village of Kašić Banjevački in the municipality was home to a Partisan monument, which was destroyed during the Croatian War of Independence. In 2008, the village replaced the previous monument with a memorial chapel to the dead from both the Second World War and the War of Independence.

== Bibliography ==
- Polić, Maja; Spicijarić Paškvan, Nina (2011). "Zloseljani (Pirovčani) i "Sjećanja na Zloseljane" Ljubomira Draganića Vrančića" (PDF). Radovi Zavoda za povijesne znanosti HAZU u Zadru (in Croatian) (53): 201–222.
