= Betina =

- Settlement
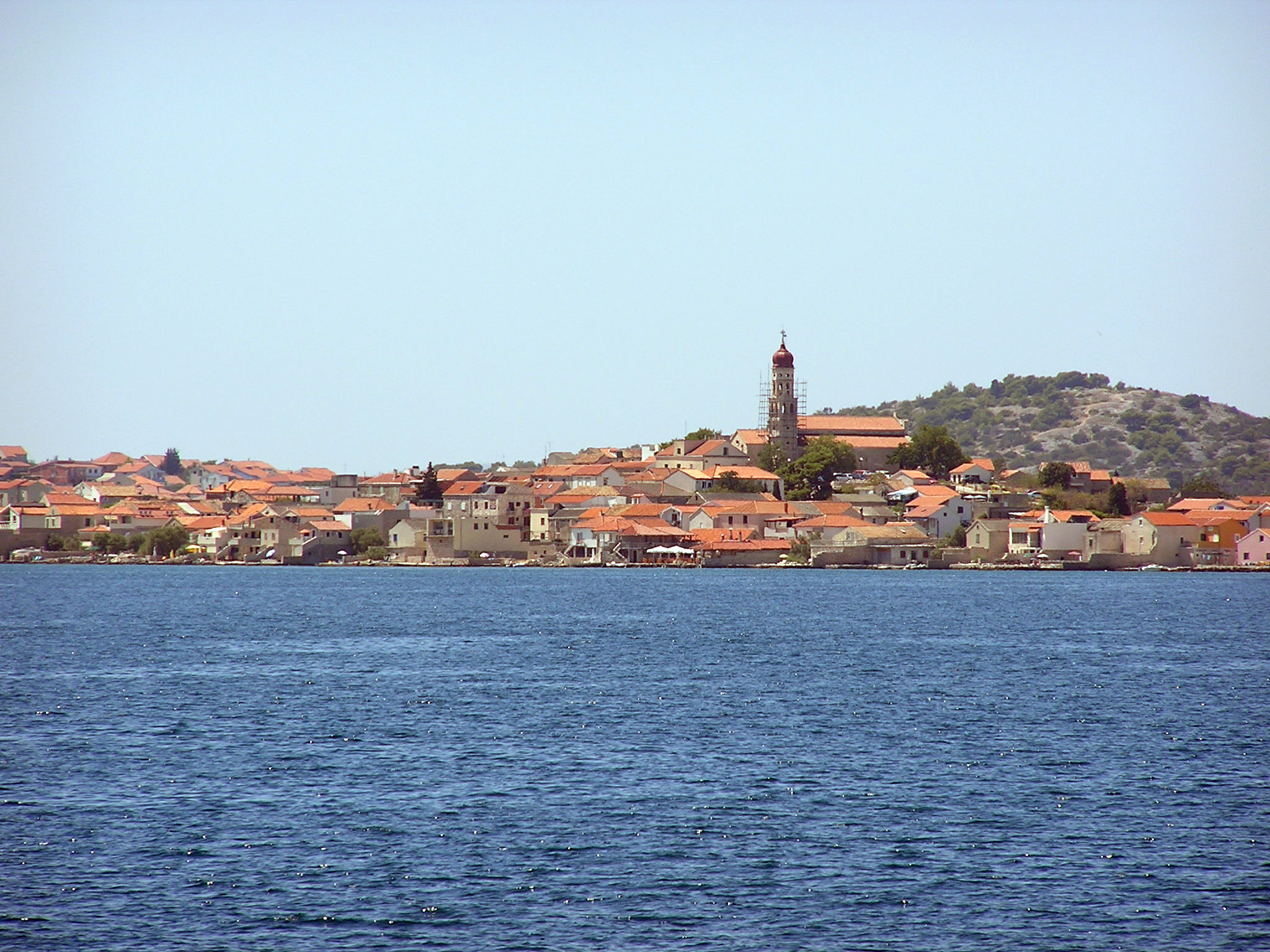

- Location within Croatia
- Coordinates: 43.822793°N 15.60465°E
- State: Croatia
- County: Šibenik-Knin County
- Municipality: Tisno

Area
  - Total: 17.8 km^{2} (6.9 sq mi)

Population (2021)
  - Total: 718
  - Density: 40.3/km^{2} (104/sq mi)
- Time zone: UTC+1 (Central European Time)

Betina is a village located on the Croatian island of Murter, seven kilometers from Tisno, where a drawbridge connects the island and the mainland. The largest of the Šibenik archipelago islands, and the closest to the mainland, it has been populated since the time of the Illyrians (tribe of Liburns). Remains of the Roman settlement of Colentum as well as many ruins of Roman villas, murals, and mosaics testify to its occupation during the period of the Roman Empire.

== History ==
The island of Murter encompasses 17.9 km^{2} (with nearby islands 25.6 km^{2}.) The island was first mentioned by Scardon in memorials of Ptolemy. It was probably first named Srimač in 1251. When King Bela arrived in Dalmatia and in Klobučac near Trogir, he issued a deed of donation which details the borders of Šibenik. The island of Srimač was mentioned as a part of Šibenik.

The Croatian name Srimač was used until 1740, but since 1443, the name Murter is also mentioned (Insula mortari, from the words Mor, sea and tar, tower). In Roman times, there had been a town called Collentum on the island in the area of today's Gradina, which was also mentioned by Ptolemy. A significant colonisation did not occur before the first half of the 16th century, during the Turkish incursion in Ravni Kotari and the Šibenik coast, and Venetian-Turkish conflicts during the second half of the 16th and the first half of the 17th century. Older villages are Murter and Betina, younger ones are Tisno and Jezera. Betina was mentioned for the first time in 1423. at which time the population was 15 persons in 8 houses, which points to an earlier origin of the village. In 1597, there were 16 houses in Betina, and in 1678, 350 persons lived there, belonging to 52 families. Since the middle of the 16th century, Betina has been inhabited by refugees from Vrana, especially since 1573, when Vrana fell under Turkish occupation. The church was built in the 16th Century. On the nearby island of Sustipanac, there was a monastery of the Franciscan friars.

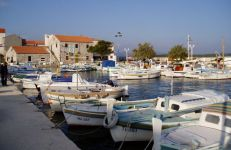
Betina from the sea.

== Population ==
According to the latest census of 2011, there are 697 people living in Betina, 344 of which are male and 353 are female. This is a drop of 77 people since the last census of 2001. 214 people are less than 30 years old, while 212 are older than 60.

== Culture and sport ==
In Betina there is an active folklore and cultural association, "Zora" which preserves the cultural customs of the village. A folklore festival is held every summer. Other associations are the Boccia club "Betina", the men's futsal club "Kalafat", the water polo club "Brodograditelj" and the women's futsal club "Betina"

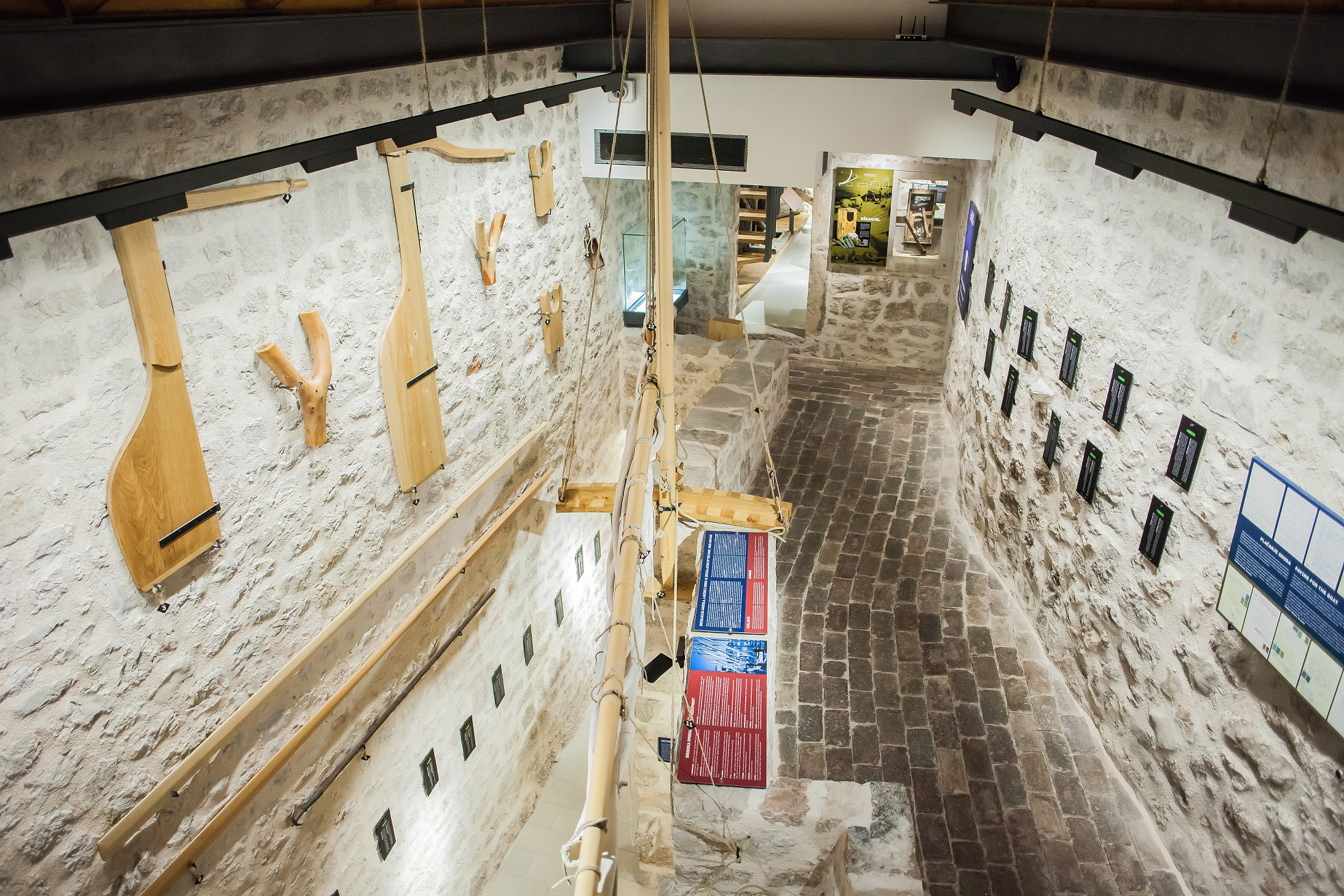
Museum of wooden shipbuilding

"Betina museum of wooden shipbuilding" was officially opened on 14 August 2015. Museum preserves traditional knowledges of small wooden shipbuilding, which takes place in Betina, island Murter, from the middle od 18th century. Betina has a long continuing tradition of shipbuilding, and today is one of a few remaining centers of small wooden shipbuilding in Croatian Adriatic coast. There are many types of ships that were built in Betina, from small boat kaić (4m long) to cargo ships (27m long). Highlight of shipbuilding skills of Betina's shipbuilders is Betina gajeta, five to eight meters long boat, two to 2,6 m wide, with the sail as the elementary navigation asset. The shipbuilding art of this wooden boat is protected as intangible cultural heritage, and is registered in the Register of Cultural Goods of the Republic of Croatia. Museum is located in protected cultural and historical whole of Betina, in the building of cultural, historical and architectural importance. Today the Museum building combines elements of modern and traditional. Permanent exhibition is located inside habitat of the stone architectural complex, linked with old brick terrace, paved the same way that it was done during the 19th century. There are 268 exhibits in Museum's permanent exhibition. Museum is divided in two wings. One presents techniques of wood treatment and processing, design and construction of the ships, tells the story of shipbuilding in Betina. The other wing contains exhibits from the fields od agriculture, fishery and daily life. Those ethnographic items depict the context of the old way of life in which the wooden ships of Betina shipbuilding were created. In the central part of the Museum there is a two-story gallery with marine equipment installation.
