= Murter =

Croatian island in the Adriatic Sea

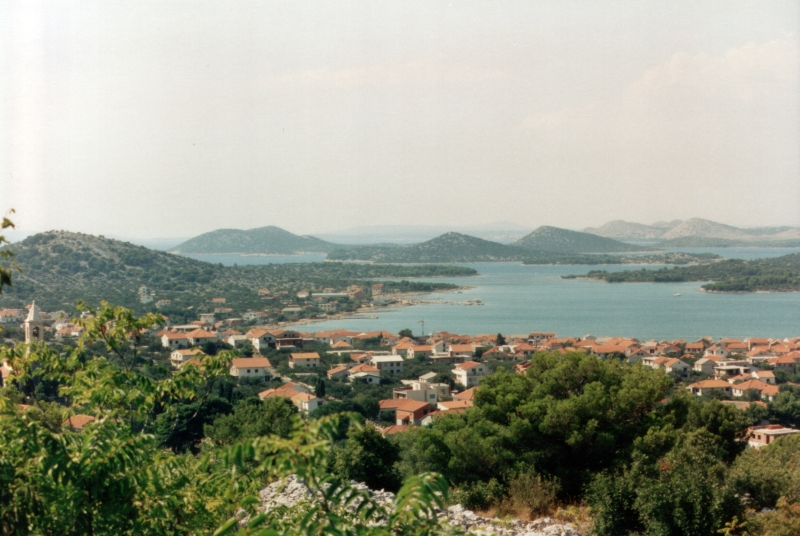
- Murter in 1995
- Interactive map of Murter

Geography
- Location: Adriatic Sea
- Coordinates: 43°48′N 15°36′E
- Archipelago: Šibenik
- Area: 18.7 km^{2} (7.2 sq mi)
- Highest elevation: 125 m (410 ft)
- Highest point: Raduč

Administration
- Croatia
- County: Šibenik-Knin County
- Municipality: Murter-Kornati and Tisno
- Largest settlement: Murter (pop. 2,025)

Demographics
- Population: 3,608 (2011)
- Pop. density: 192.94/km^{2} (499.71/sq mi)
- Ethnic groups: 97.59% Croats

Murter (pronounced [mǔrtɛːr]) is an island in the Croatian part of the Adriatic Sea.

== Population ==
The main settlements on the island are Murter, located on the north-western part of the island, and the southern part of Tisno. Other settlements on the island include the villages of Betina on the northwestern side and Jezera on the southeastern coast. In the 2011 census, the total island population is about 3,608 inhabitants.

== Geography ==
The island is in the northwest part of the Šibenik archipelago, separated from the mainland by a 20 m (66 ft) wide sea canal at Tisno which is spanned by a short draw-bridge. The island covers an area of about 18.7 km^{2} (7.2 sq mi), and the highest point is the peak of Raduč at 125 metres (410 feet) above sea level. There are old military tunnels dug deep inside the hill.

The southwestern coastline is predominantly steep slopes divided by many sandy coves. The island has many rocky beaches, as well as several sandy ones.

== History ==
The island has been populated for nearly two millennia. An Illyric-Roman settlement known as Colentum has been found near Betina. In 1293, documents show that Murter was called "Villa Magna' meaning big village. During the 13th century there were two documented settlements on the island: Jezera and Veliko Selo. Srimač (now Murter) and the island itself were mentioned in the year 1318 as Insula Mortari. Betina and Tisno were most likely built around the beginning of the 15th century, during the time of Ottoman attacks in the area. The population of the island increased as refugees fled from the Turks.

In a naval battle in June 1944, the Yugoslav torpedo boat T7 - then part of the pro-Nazi Navy of the Independent State of Croatia - was driven aground on Murter and destroyed by Royal Navy Fairmile D motor torpedo boats.

== Heritage ==
- Many Christian texts written in Glagolitic/Slavonic instead of the traditional Latin style have been found and are preserved here and in the Vatican.
- St. Michael's church, St. Rock's chapel, and the church of Our Lady of Gradina are the oldest churches on the island.
- The population of Murter traditionally are engaged in agriculture and fishing and are well-known for these skills, as well as being producers of excellent olive oil. There is a short film documentary about the touristic season; off the island, the title of the film is "Post Mortem".
- Beaches, quality accommodation, and various services make Murter an ideal tourist destination; it has been one of the most visited destinations in this region for years.
- A little-known fact is that the island had a military base built in World War Two on top of the hill, with tunnels bored deep inside it. Some locals believe the place is haunted.
