= D105 road =

Road in Croatia

D105 state road

Route information
- Length: 22.7 km (14.1 mi)

Major junctions
- From: Lopar ferry port
- To: Mišnjak ferry port

Location
- Country: Croatia
- Counties: Primorje-Gorski Kotar
- Major cities: Rab

Highway system
- Highways in Croatia

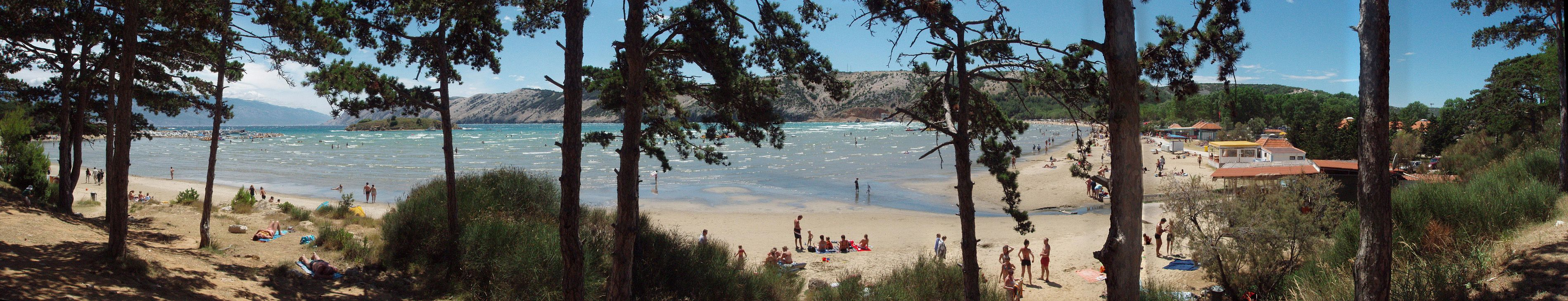
Lopar - San Marino beach, near the northern terminus of the D105

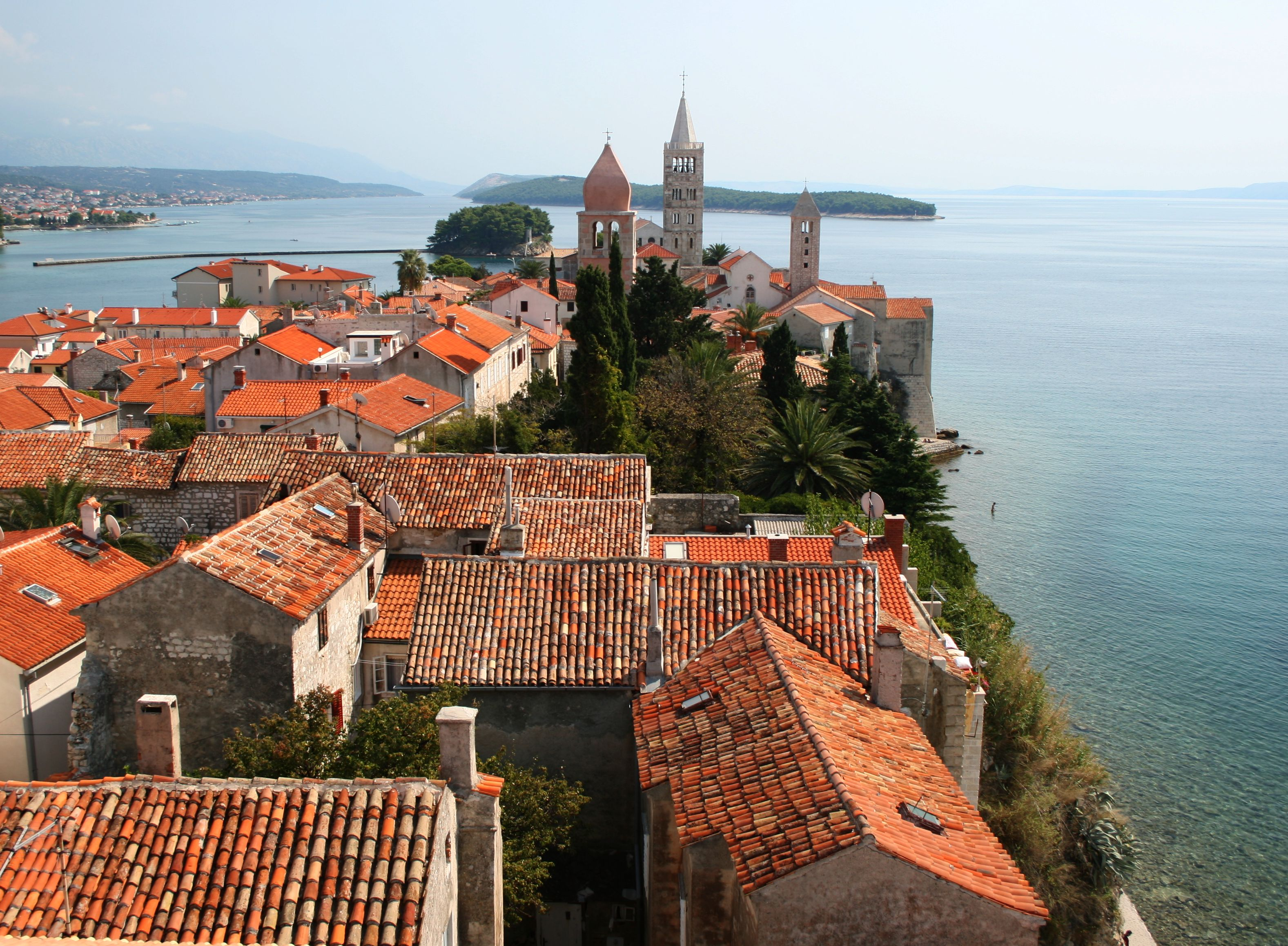
Rab, near on the D105 road route

D105 is a state road on Rab Island in Croatia connecting the town of Rab to Mišnjak ferry ports, from where Rapska Plovidba ferries fly to the mainland, docking in Jablanac and the D405 state road and to Lopar ferry port from where Jadrolinija ferries fly to Valbiska, Krk and the D104. The road is 22.7 km (14.1 mi) long.

The road, as well as all other state roads in Croatia, is managed and maintained by Hrvatske ceste, a state-owned company.

== Traffic volume ==
Traffic is regularly counted and reported by Hrvatske ceste (HC), operator of the road. Substantial variations between annual (AADT) and summer (ASDT) traffic volumes are attributed to the fact that the road connects a number of island resorts.

D105 traffic volume
Road	Counting site	AADT	ASDT	Notes
D105	4104 Rab	4,005	9,996	Adjacent to the Ž5139 junction.

== Road junctions and populated areas ==
D105 junctions/populated areas
Type	Slip roads/Notes
	Lopar ferry port – access to the island of Krk (by Jadrolinija) and the D104 to Krk, Rijeka and the A7 motorway Sveti Kuzam interchange. The northern terminus of the road.
	Lopar; Ž5138 to San Marino.
	Gornja Draga
	Supetarska Draga
	Mundanije
	Rab; Ž5139 to Kampor, Banjol and Barbat.
	Barbat; Ž5139 to Kampor, Banjol and Rab.
	Mišnjak ferry port – access to the mainland port of Jablanac (by Rapska Plovidba) and the D405 to Senj and Rijeka (to the north) and to Karlobag and Zadar to the south. The southern terminus of the road.

== See also ==
- Hrvatske ceste
