= D405 road =

Road in Croatia

D405 state road

Route information
- Length: 4.8 km (3.0 mi)

Major junctions
- From: D8 near Jablanac
- To: Stinica ferry port

Location
- Country: Croatia
- Counties: Lika-Senj

Highway system
- Highways in Croatia

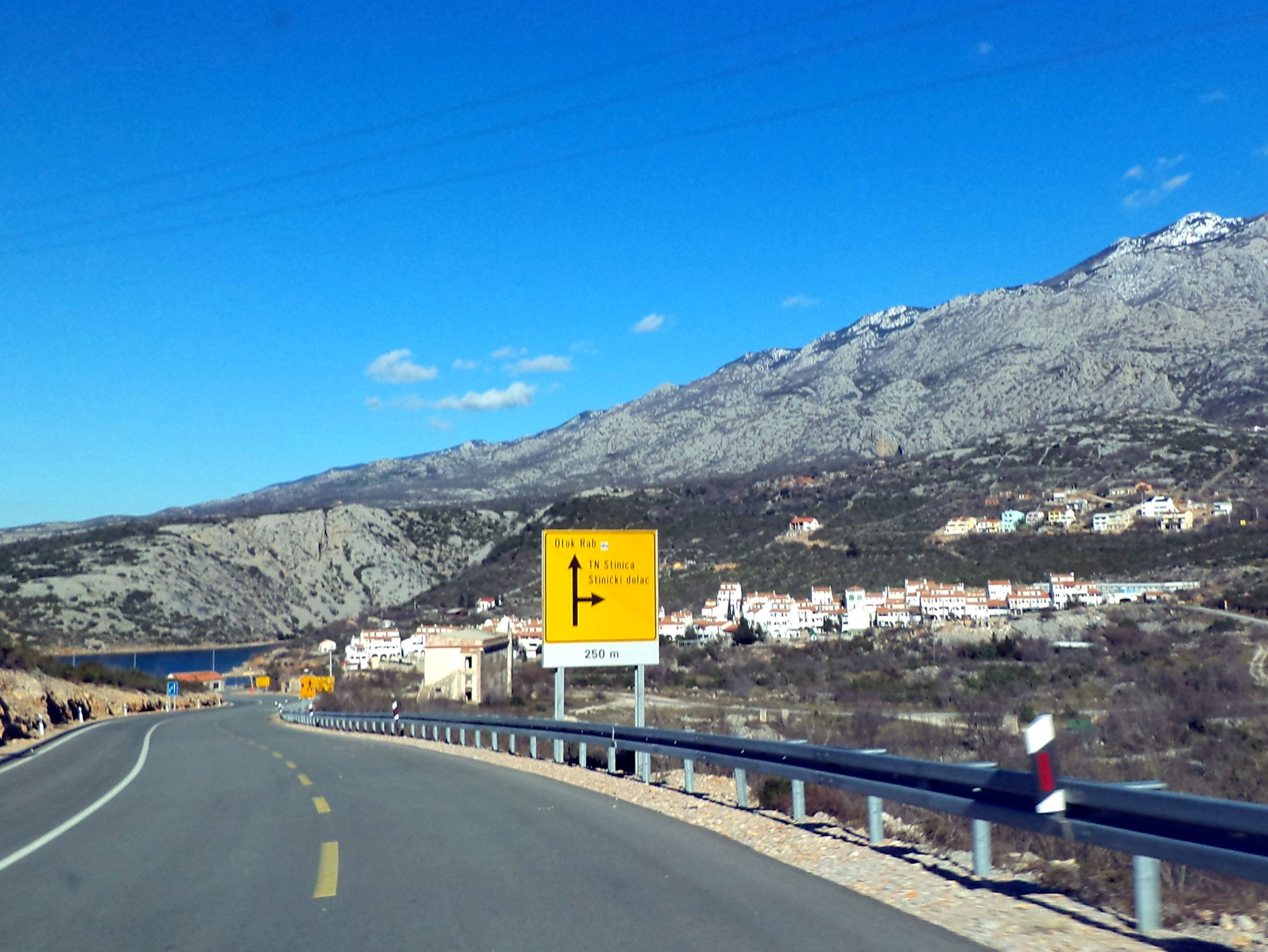
D405 road in Stinica

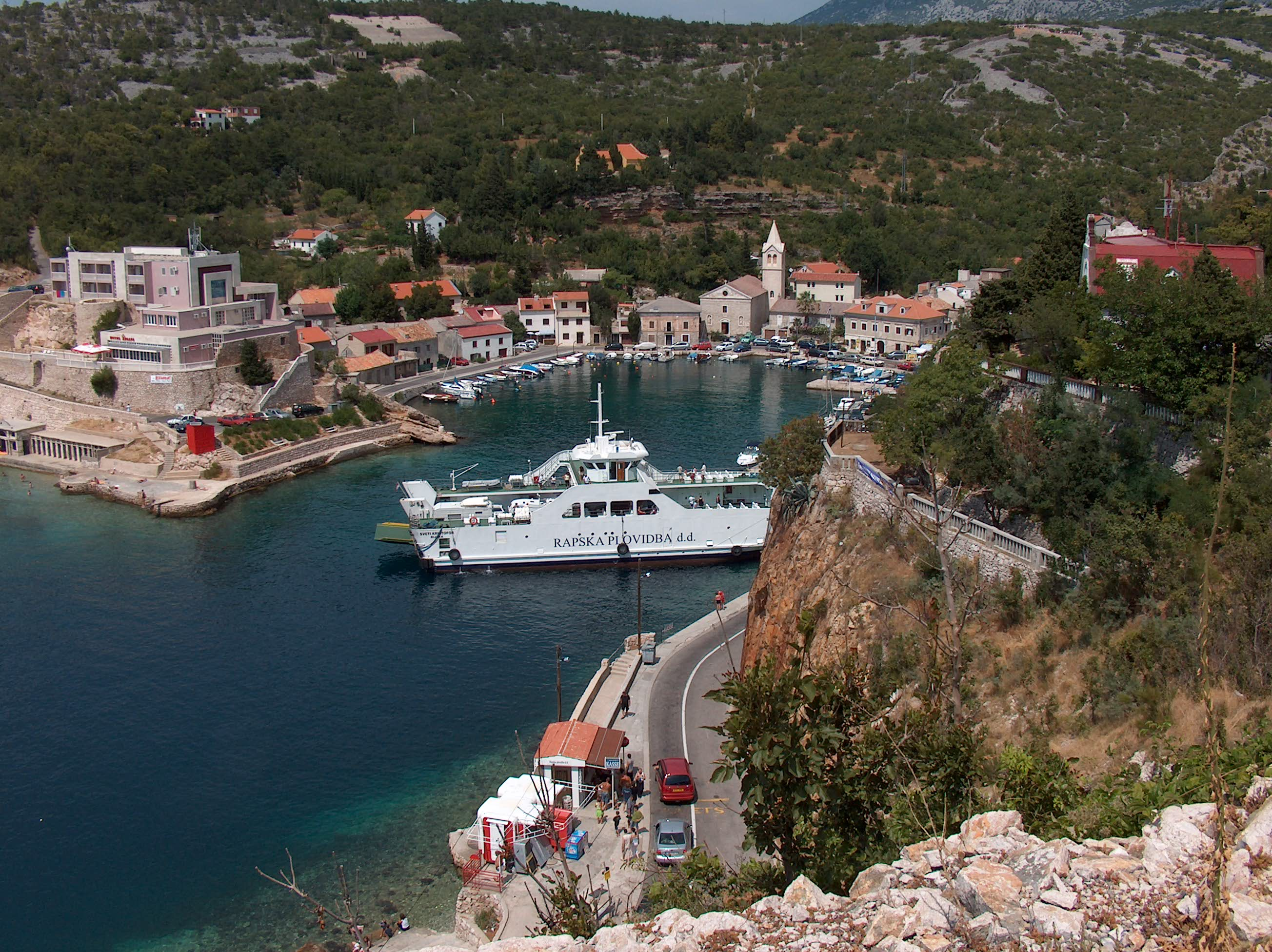
Jablanac, at the southern terminus of the D405 road

D405 branches off to the southwest from D8 near Jablanac towards Stinica ferry port - ferry access to Mišnjak, island of Rab (D105). The road is 4.8 km long.

This road, like all other state roads in Croatia, is managed and maintained by Hrvatske ceste, state owned company.

== Traffic volume ==
Traffic is not regularly counted on the road, however, Hrvatske ceste reports number of vehicles using Jablanac-Mišnjak ferry line, connecting D405 to the D105 state road. Substantial variations between annual (AADT) and summer (ASDT) traffic volumes are attributed to the fact that the road connects to a number of summer resorts.

D405 traffic volume
| Road | Counting site | AADT | ASDT | Notes |
| D405 | 337 Stinica-Mišnjak | 979 | 2,876 | Vehicles using Stinica-Mišnjak ferry line. |

== Road junctions and populated areas ==
D405 junctions/populated areas
| Type | Slip roads/Notes |
| | D8 to Rijeka (to the north) and Zadar (to the south). Northern terminus of the road. |
| | Jablanac |
| | Stinica ferry port - ferry access to Mišnjak, island of Rab (D105). Southern terminus of the road. |
