= Rab (town) =

- Town
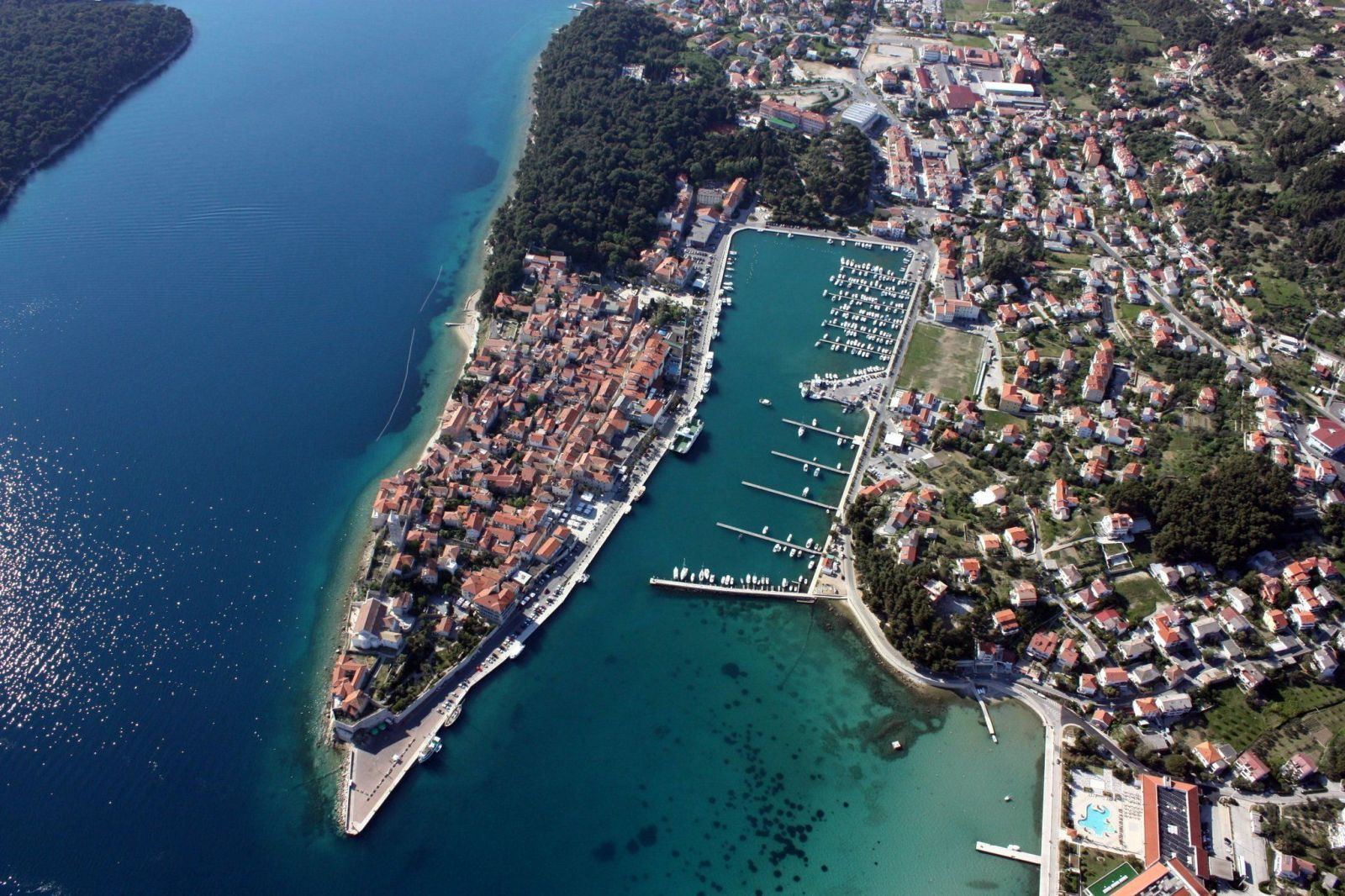
- Aerial view of historic town center of Rab
- Interactive map of Rab
- Location of Rab within Croatia
- Coordinates: 44°45′22″N 14°45′40″E
- Country: Croatia
- County: Primorje-Gorski Kotar County
- Island: Rab

Government
  - Mayor: Nikola Grgurić (HDZ)
  - City Council: 15 members: • HDZ, HSS, RPS (8); • SDP, HNS, HSU, PGS (5); • Independents (2)

Area
  - Town: 75.9 km^{2} (29.3 sq mi)
  - Urban: 0.4 km^{2} (0.15 sq mi)
- Elevation: 0 m (0 ft)

Population (2021)
  - Town: 7,161
  - Density: 94.3/km^{2} (244/sq mi)
  - Urban: 364
  - Urban density: 910/km^{2} (2,400/sq mi)
- Time zone: UTC+1 (CET)
  - Summer (DST): UTC+2 (CEST)
- Postal code: 51 280
- Area code: 051
- Website: rab.hr

Rab is a town on the island of Rab in Croatia. Rab, the settlement, is located on a small peninsula on the southwestern side of the island.

== History ==
The town has a long history that dates back to 360 BC when it was inhabited by the Illyrians. The island was the frontier between the regions of Liburnia and Dalmatia. From the third century BC to the sixth century AD Rab was part of the Roman Empire, and Emperor Augustus proclaimed it a municipium in 10 BC. It was the first town of Roman Dalmatia to be given the honorary title "felix".

Saint Marinus, the Christian founder of San Marino, was a native of Rab who is said to have fled the island under Diocletian's persecution in AD 301.

Among the signatories of the Second Council of Nicea was a bishop of Rab, namely Ursus. (“Ursus episcopus Avaritianensium ecclesiae” Ursus of Rab)

The worst disaster in the town's history was an outbreak of the plague in 1456 that decimated the city's population.

In 2019, much of the old town was evacuated for 9 days because of a gas leak. At 17:07 on 24 June, the VOC Rab received a call from a resident of the third floor of an apartment on Put Kaldanca street about the smell of gas. Already at 17:15, the presence of an explosive gas at a concentration of 9% was confirmed, and part of the old town of Rab was evacuated. All night, firefighters searched for the source of the gas leak. The next morning, the DVD Rab under commander Milivoj Ličina confirmed the presence of gas throughout the wider area, and relayed the working assumption that the gas was leaked during the filling of the gas storage for Hotel Arbiana on the evening of the 22nd. Ventillation efforts began on the 25th and lasted day and night throughout the period.

== Climate ==
Since records began in 1978, the highest temperature recorded at the local weather station at an elevation of 24 metres (79 ft) was 39.3 °C (102.7 °F), on 22 July 2015. The coldest temperature was −6.4 °C (20.5 °F), on 7 January 1985.

== Demographics ==
In the 2021 census, the total population was 8,065, in the following settlements:

- Banjol, population 1708 ▼
- Barbat na Rabu, population 1140 ▼
- Kampor, population 1030 ▼
- Mundanije, population 402 ▼
- Palit, population 1580 ▼
- Rab, population 364 ▼
- Supetarska Draga, population 937 ▼
Town of Rab: Population trends 1857–2021
v

population	3589	3952	4279	4525	4465	5099	5099	6352	7230	7757	7849	8041	8496	9205	9480	8065	7161
	1857	1869	1880	1890	1900	1910	1921	1931	1948	1953	1961	1971	1981	1991	2001	2011	2021

Sources: Croatian Bureau of Statistics publications

== Attractions ==
There are many churches in the town. The largest is St. Mary the Blessed, which was built in the 13th century. The church of St. Justine is now a museum of sacred arts, while the chapel of St. Christopher (dedicated to the patron saint of the island) is nowadays called the Lapidarium. The four church bell towers became the symbol of the town and island. The oldest dates back to the eleventh century.

== Sports ==
The local HPS chapter was called HPD "Kamenjak", but it was liquidated on 3 March 1937.

== Gallery ==
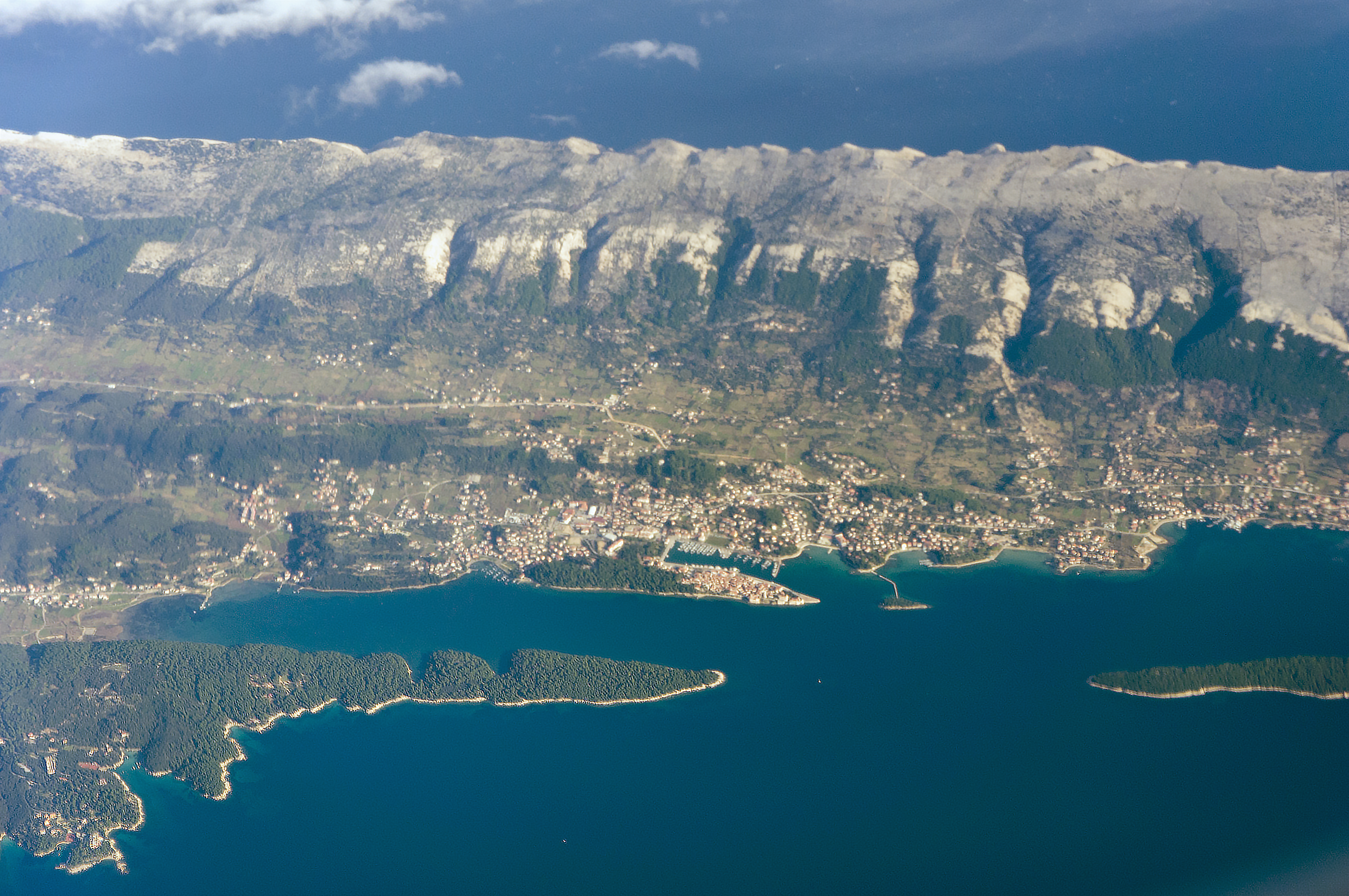
View of Rab from air

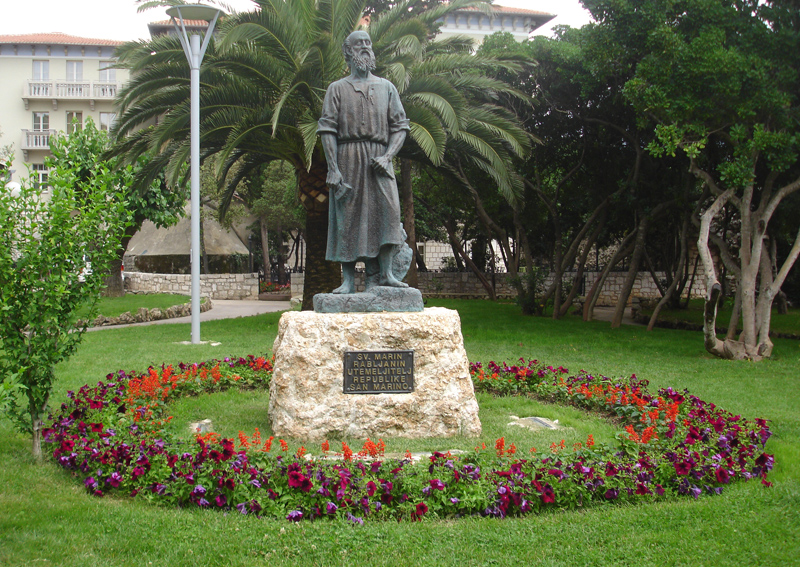
Statue of San Marino

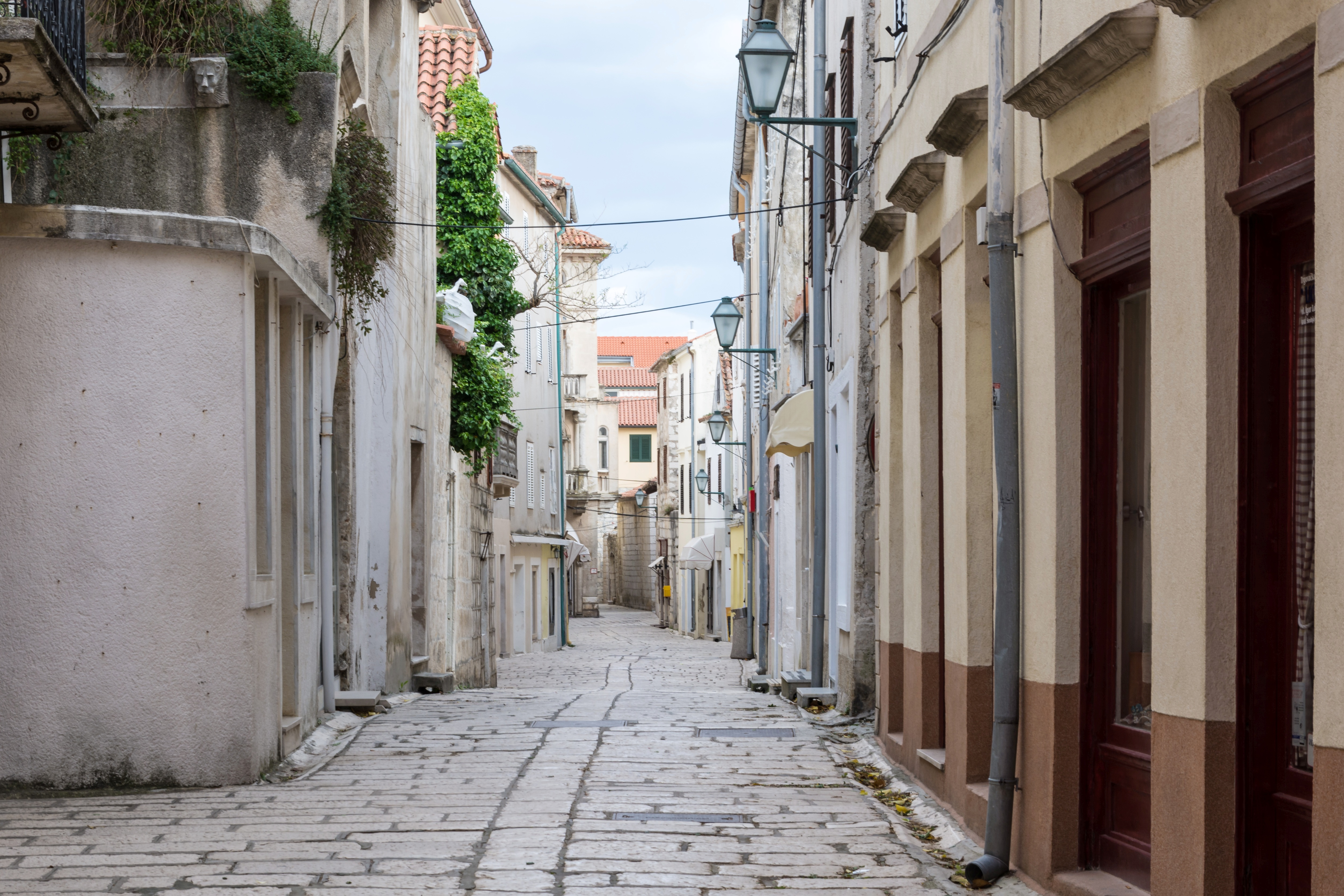
Streets of Rab

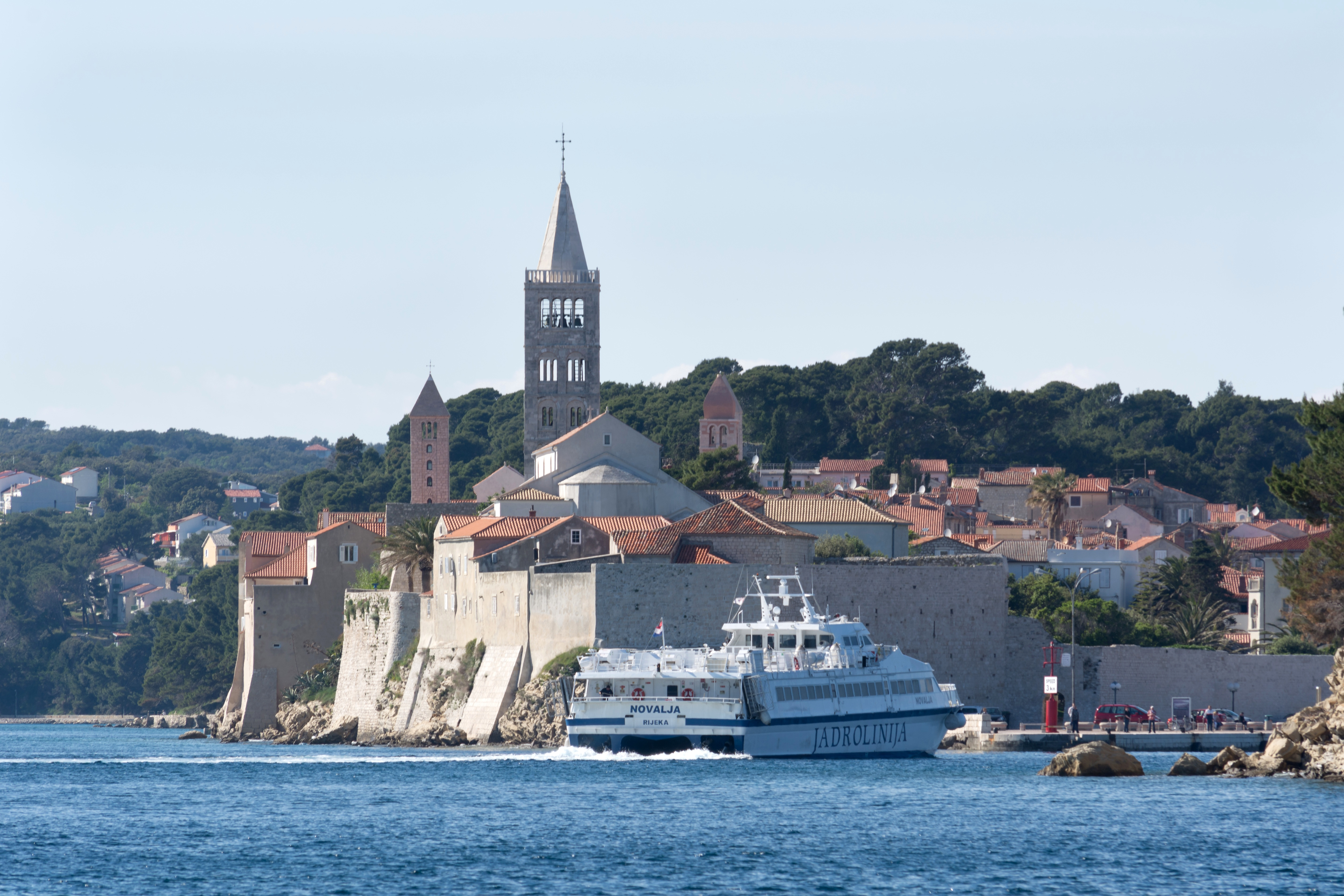
Old Town

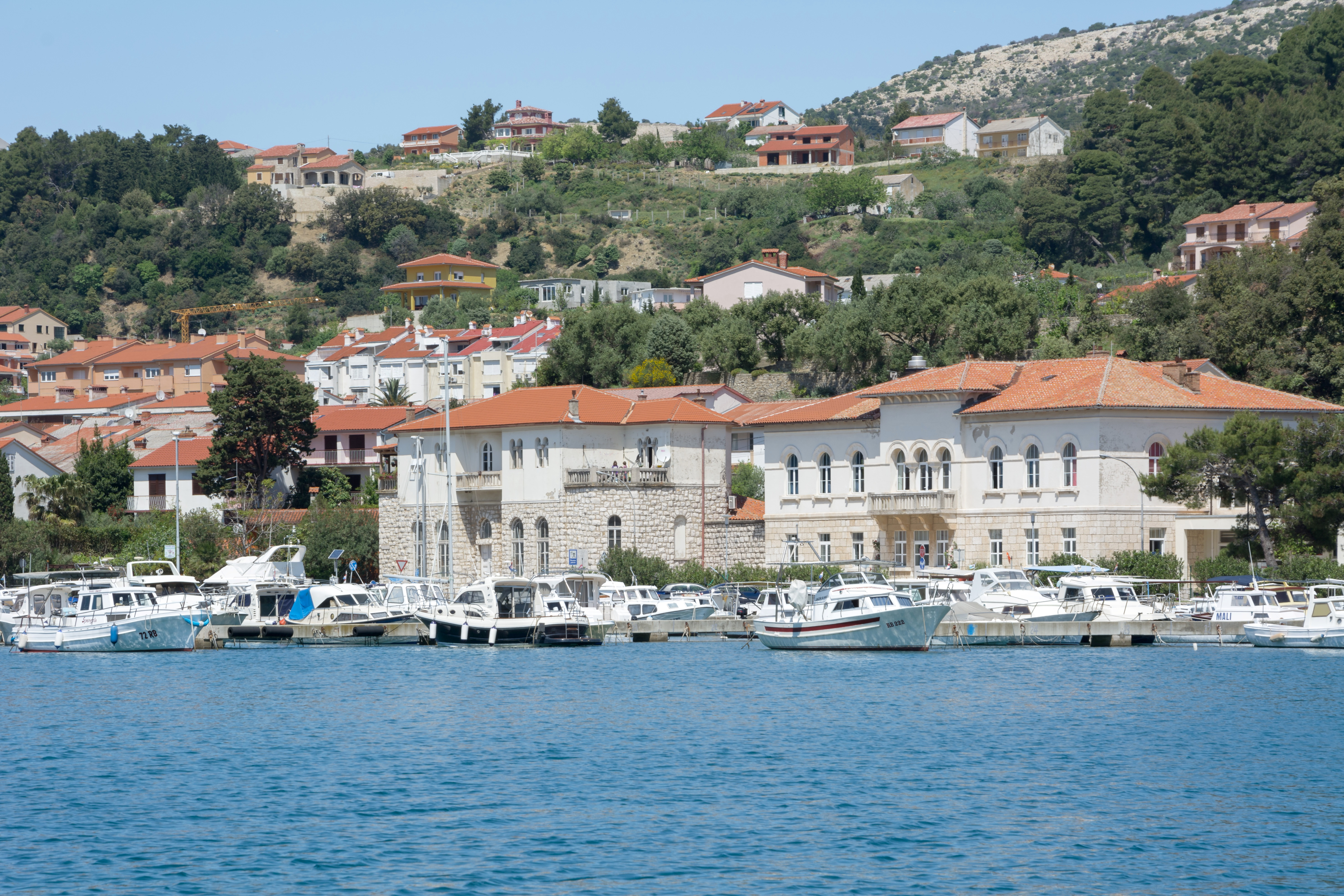
Ivan Dominis Promenade

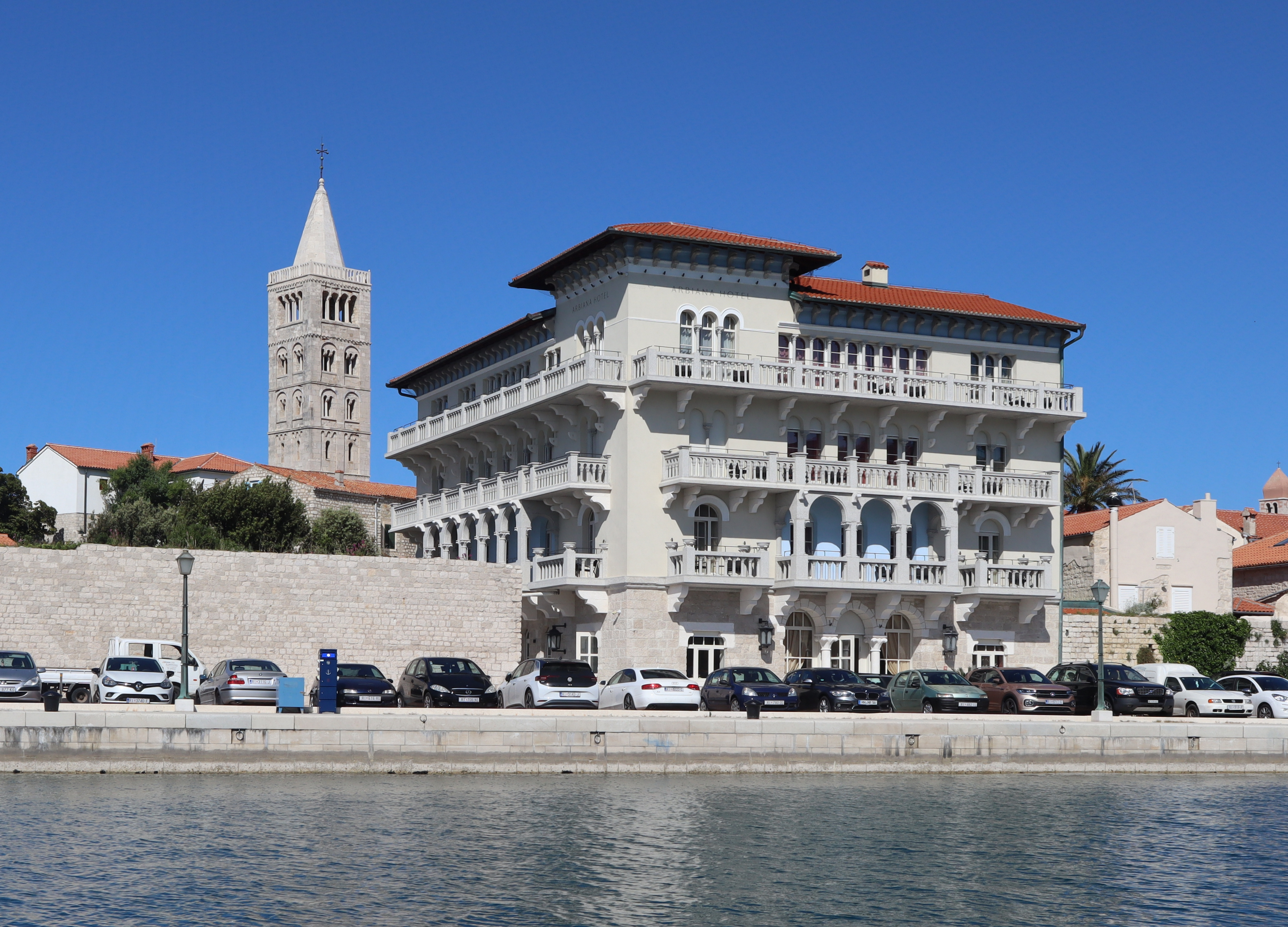
Arbiana Hotel

== International relations ==
Rab is twinned with:

- City of San Marino, San Marino(1968)

== Bibliography ==
=== Biology ===
- Šašić, Martina; Nahirnić, Ana; Tarmann, Gerhard M. (2016-12-31). "Zygaenidae (Lepidoptera) in the Lepidoptera collections of the Croatian Natural History Museum". Natura Croatica: Periodicum Musei Historiae Naturalis Croatici. 25 (2): 233–248. doi:10.20302/NC.2016.25.19. eISSN 1848-7386.

== Attribution ==
- The original version of this article was taken from the Wikipedia article Rab.
