= Northern Velebit National Park =

National park in Croatia

- IUCN category II (national park)
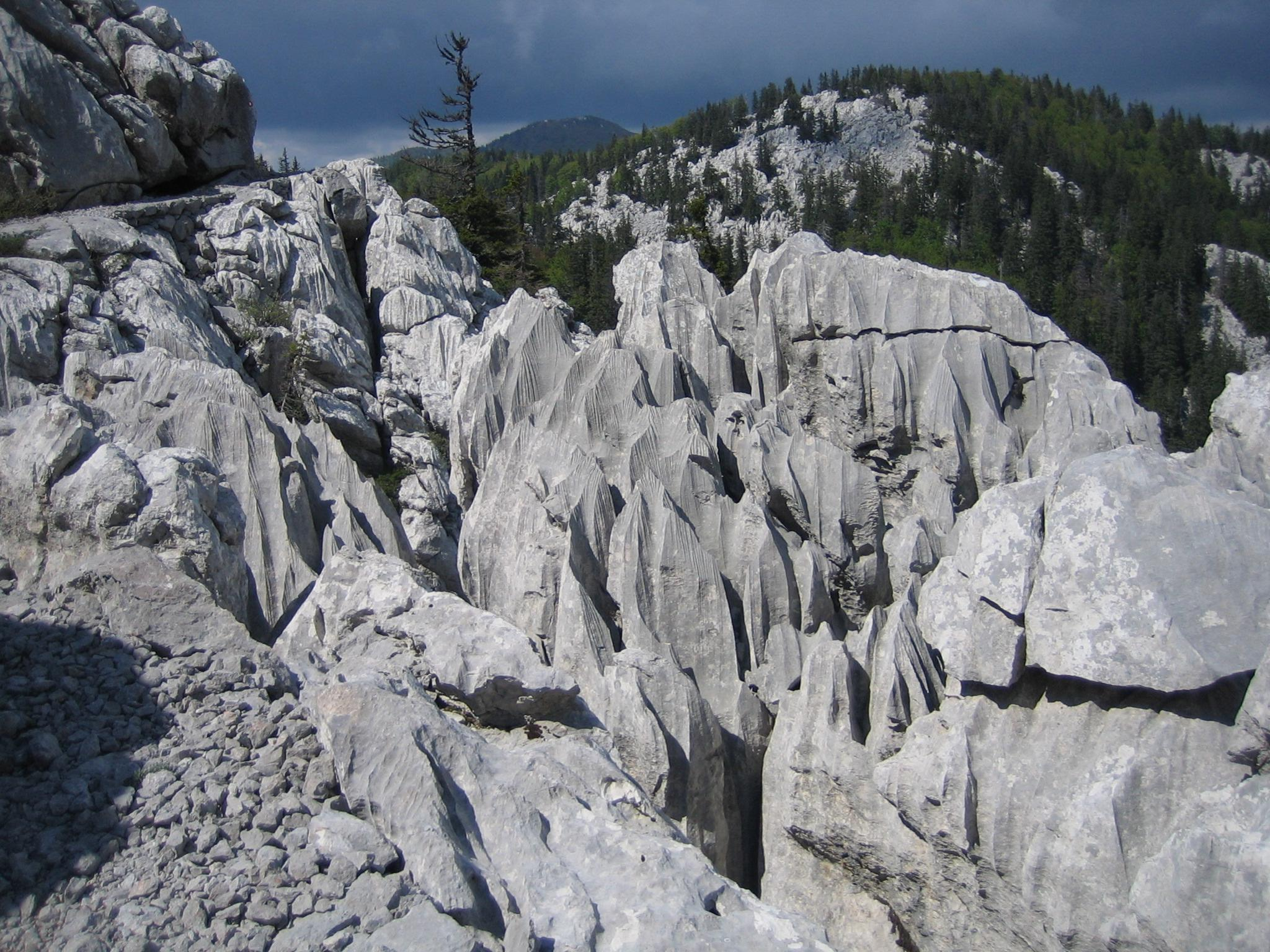

- Location within Croatia
- Interactive map of Northern Velebit National Park
- Location: Lika-Senj County, Croatia
- Nearest city: Senj
- Coordinates: 44°48′52.20″N 14°58′31.44″E
- Area: 109 km^{2} (42 sq mi)
- Established: June 17, 1999
- Visitors: 15,100 (in 2010)

The Northern Velebit National Park (Croatian: Nacionalni park Sjeverni Velebit) is a national park in Croatia that covers 109 km^{2} of the northern section of the Velebit mountains, the largest mountain range in Croatia. Because of the abundant variety of this part of the Velebit range, the area was upgraded from a nature reserve in 1999, and opened as a national park in September the same year.

The whole of the Velebit range is a "nature park", a lesser conservation category. Another national park on Velebit is the Paklenica on its southern side.

In 2017, the beech forests within the national park were added to the UNESCO World Heritage Site known as Ancient and Primeval Beech Forests of the Carpathians and Other Regions of Europe because of their testimony to the ecological history of forest dynamics within Europe since the last Ice Age.

== The park ==
The park reserve is protected and visitors are restricted to designated trails. Inside the reserve is the Visibaba (Galanthus) botanical reserve, with an abundance of the endemic Croatian subspecies of Sibiraea altaiensis, and the Zavižan–Balinovac–Velika kosa botanical reserve, famous for its outstanding collection of mountain flora species. Inside the reserve is the well-known Velebit Botany Garden, founded by pharmacology professor and botanist Fran Kušan in 1967.

The Park is criss-crossed with mountaineering trails. The best-known is Premužić's Trail, named after its constructor, the forester Ante Premužić who built it in late 1933. The path runs through the most beautiful and most interesting parts of the park. From the numerous peaks in the surroundings there are magnificent views of the Adriatic Sea and its islands (Pag, Rab, Goli Otok, Prvić and Krk) as well as of the continental side.

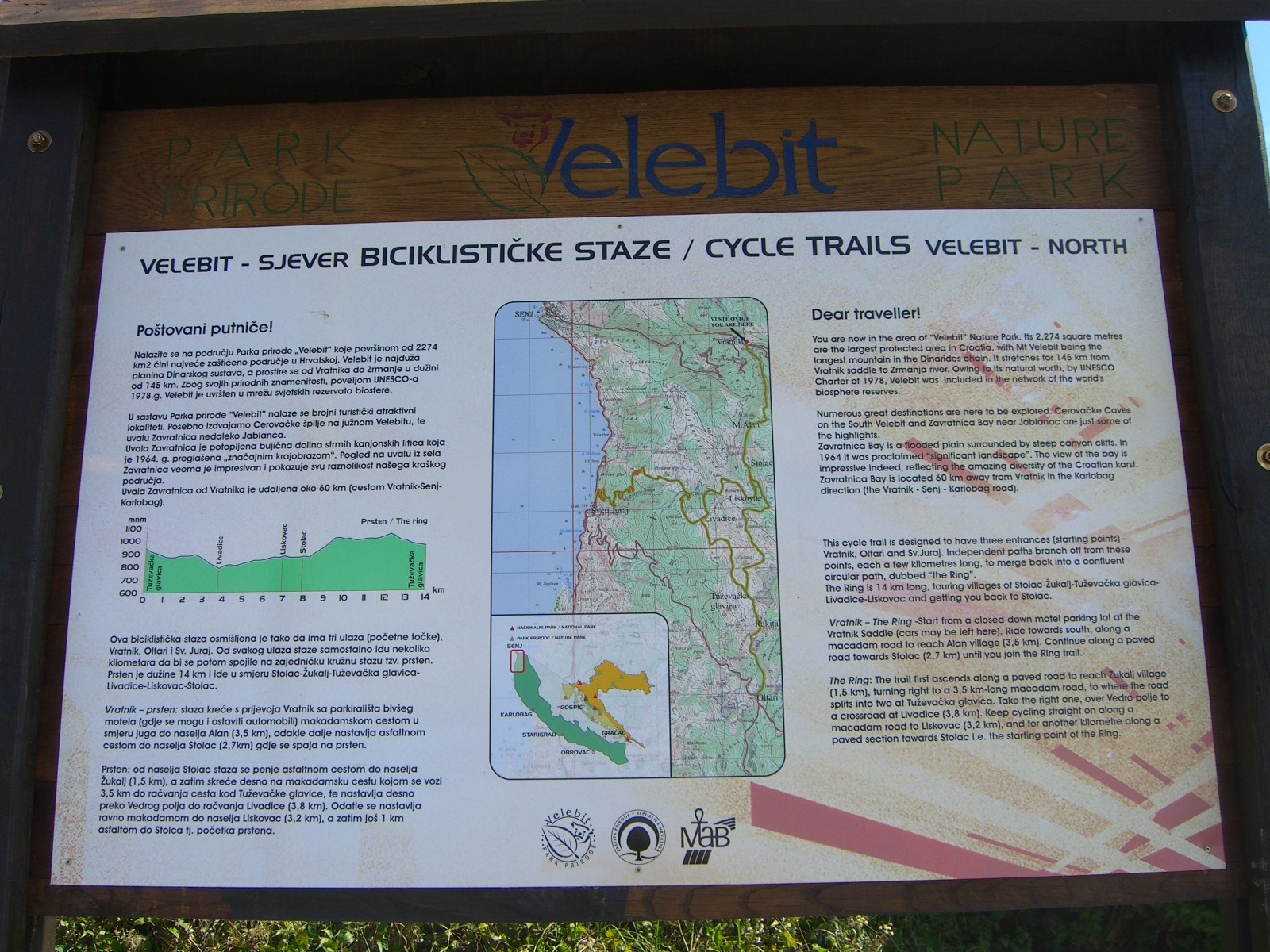
Park map

Adding to the Park's cultural value are the numerous ruins of so-called "summer lodges". These remain from when Velebit was populated by shepherds and cattle farmers. On its coastal slopes are many ruined houses, lodges and stone walls, all the remaining evidence of a lost local population.

The Zavižan (1676 m) peak is within the park, the highest meteorological station in Croatia.

== Special reservations ==
The special reservations in the park are many locales called Hajdučki kukovi, Rožanski kukovi, Lukina jama (one of the deepest caves systems in the world), botanical reserve "Visibaba", Borov vrh forest reserve, Zavižan-Balinovac-Velika kosa botanical reserve and the famous Velebit botanical garden. In the southern-end is the Štirovača special forest vegetation reserve. The names of Hajdučki kukovi and Rožanski kukovi come from a folk name given to large stone masses which rise up over the surroundings of the Velebit mountains. They are in the center of the park, but are not a regular part of it, access to them is restricted to scientific researchers and educational visitors.

=== Hajdučki kukovi ===
Hajdučki kukovi is one of the Kukovi group of peaks in the northern part of the Velebit. Together with Rožanski kukovi it forms an area of around 22 km^{2} declared as a nature reserve in 1969. It is separated from Rožanski kukovi by the Skrbina Draga and Veliki Lubenovac field.

The kukovi group has around 40 summits exceeding 1600 m. The area around Hajdučki kukovi has a complex underground drainage system. The terrain is much wilder than around Rožanski kukovi, and there are parts where even today no human foot has ever trod. Lukina jama, the deepest mountain cave in Croatia and one of the deepest in southeast Europe, with a depth of 1392 m, was discovered in 1992 by a local caving enthusiast named Ozren Lukić. Lukić joined a mountain division during the war (1991–95) as a volunteer and was killed by a sniper in 1992. Lukina jama was named after him.

=== Rožanski kukovi ===
Rossi's Cabin

The first "kuk", Gromovača (1675 m), is a two-and-a-half-hour walk from the hostel in Zavižan. The centre of the rocks begin immediately behind Rossijeva koliba (a mountain hut), also 2.5 hours' walk from the hostel. The most interesting part of this rocky region is on the path from Rossilijeva koliba to Crikvena (1641 m), half an hour's walk from the hut.

In an area of about 18 km^{2} there are more than fifty stony peaks, all over 1600 m, some with bizarre shapes of towers, spires or obelisks. Here all the phenomena of karst rock meet – chasms, dizzying heights, crevices, caves, natural gateways and passes.

The best-known and most popular sights are Novotnijev kuk, Rossilijev kuk and Premužićev kuk.

In the 1935–1936 season, the Rosijeva kuća mountain hut on Rožanski kukovi, at 1,620 metres (5,310 ft) in elevation, saw 70 visitors. The Krajačeva kuća at 1,580 metres (5,180 ft) on Zavižan saw 110. In the 1936–1937 season, Rosijeva kuća saw 81 visitors, including 2 German and 1 Czechoslovak citizens; the Krajačeva kuća (open 1 June through 30 September) saw 163 visitors, including 2 German and 1 Czechoslovak citizens. Both were under caretaker Ivan Modrić. In the 1937–1938 season, Rossijeva kuća saw 89 visitors, including 1 Italian and 1 Austrian citizen; Krajačeva kuća saw 153 visitors. Both were under caretaker Modrić.

== Climate ==
Climate data for Northern Velebit National Park (Zavižan)
Month	Jan	Feb	Mar	Apr	May	Jun	Jul	Aug	Sep	Oct	Nov	Dec	Year
Record high °C (°F)	12.5 (54.5)	13.8 (56.8)	16.5 (61.7)	19.4 (66.9)	23.1 (73.6)	24.4 (75.9)	27.6 (81.7)	28.2 (82.8)	27.2 (81.0)	20.6 (69.1)	19.2 (66.6)	14.6 (58.3)	28.2 (82.8)
Mean daily maximum °C (°F)	−0.7 (30.7)	−0.9 (30.4)	1.4 (34.5)	4.4 (39.9)	10.1 (50.2)	13.6 (56.5)	16.6 (61.9)	16.9 (62.4)	12.6 (54.7)	8.4 (47.1)	3.2 (37.8)	0.5 (32.9)	7.2 (45.0)
Daily mean °C (°F)	−3.5 (25.7)	−4.0 (24.8)	−1.7 (28.9)	1.2 (34.2)	6.5 (43.7)	9.9 (49.8)	12.5 (54.5)	12.4 (54.3)	8.9 (48.0)	5.0 (41.0)	0.2 (32.4)	−2.4 (27.7)	3.8 (38.8)
Mean daily minimum °C (°F)	−6.1 (21.0)	−6.5 (20.3)	−4.3 (24.3)	−1.2 (29.8)	3.8 (38.8)	7.0 (44.6)	9.4 (48.9)	9.5 (49.1)	6.2 (43.2)	2.4 (36.3)	−2.3 (27.9)	−5.0 (23.0)	1.1 (34.0)
Record low °C (°F)	−24.5 (−12.1)	−28.6 (−19.5)	−22.6 (−8.7)	−14.5 (5.9)	−9.8 (14.4)	−3.1 (26.4)	0.2 (32.4)	−2.0 (28.4)	−3.8 (25.2)	−11.5 (11.3)	−16.8 (1.8)	−24.2 (−11.6)	−28.6 (−19.5)
Average precipitation mm (inches)	144.7 (5.70)	147.2 (5.80)	147.0 (5.79)	179.3 (7.06)	154.7 (6.09)	156.4 (6.16)	86.5 (3.41)	121.8 (4.80)	180.4 (7.10)	215.9 (8.50)	245.6 (9.67)	204.0 (8.03)	1,983.4 (78.09)
Average precipitation days (≥ 0.1 mm)	14.7	14.1	14.4	16.1	13.6	13.6	9.6	9.4	11.7	13.7	15.0	15.4	161.3
Average snowy days (≥ 1.0 cm)	29.1	27.2	29.8	27.9	9.9	1.0	0.0	0.0	0.5	4.7	16.1	27.6	173.9
Average relative humidity (%)	80.6	79.8	80.4	81.1	78.6	77.1	72.6	73.5	77.9	80.8	82.6	81.4	78.9
Mean monthly sunshine hours	99.2	115.8	145.7	156.0	217.0	237.0	297.6	282.1	204.0	142.6	96.0	89.9	2,082.9
Percentage possible sunshine	35	40	40	41	51	55	67	68	55	42	34	34	49
Source: Croatian Meteorological and Hydrological Service

== Alan ==
In the 1935–1936 season, the mountain shelter at Mirovo, at 1,250 metres (4,100 ft) in elevation, saw 30 visitors. In the 1936–1937 season, it saw 6 visitors. The existing shelter had few amenities, so a 5-year lease was signed with Vinko Matijević, the owner of the most comfortable house in the area at the time, to use his house as a mountain hut. In the 1937–1938 season, open year-round under caretaker Matijević, the new mountain hut saw 62 visitors, including 3 German and 1 Austrian citizens. The old Mirovo hut was closed.

== See also ==
- Geography of Croatia
- Rewilding Europe
- Zavratnica
- List of protected areas of Croatia
