= Barbat na Rabu =

- Village
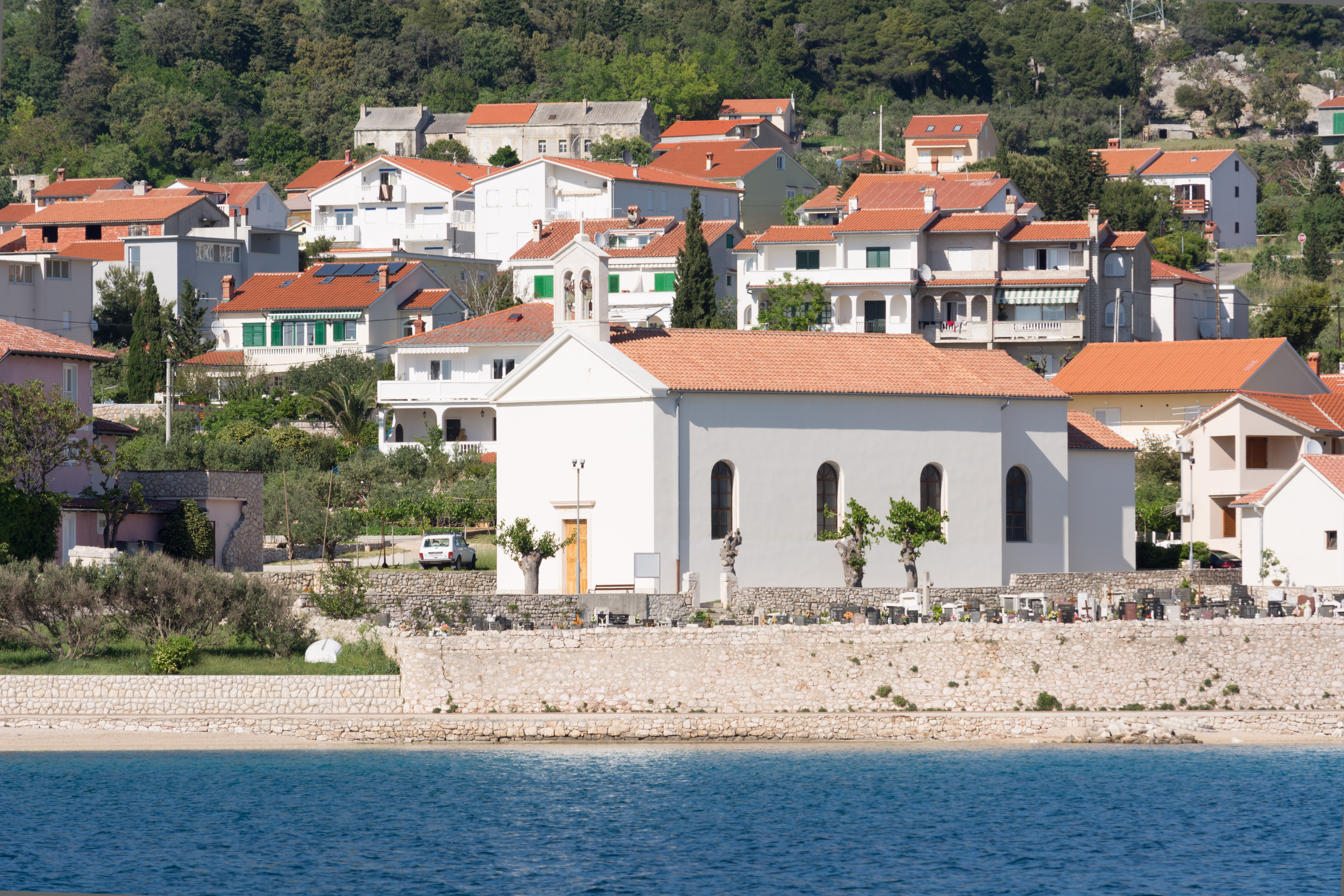

- Location within Croatia
- Coordinates: 44°44′N 14°49′E
- Country: Croatia
- County: Primorje-Gorski Kotar
- Municipality: Rab

Area
  - Total: 23.9 km^{2} (9.2 sq mi)

Population (2021)
  - Total: 1,140
  - Density: 47.7/km^{2} (124/sq mi)
- Time zone: UTC+1 (CET)
  - Summer (DST): UTC+2 (CEST)

Barbat na Rabu is a village on the island of Rab, Croatia. It is connected by the D105 highway.
