= Sahara Beach =

Beach in Croatia

Coordinates: 44°50′27″N 14°45′4″E

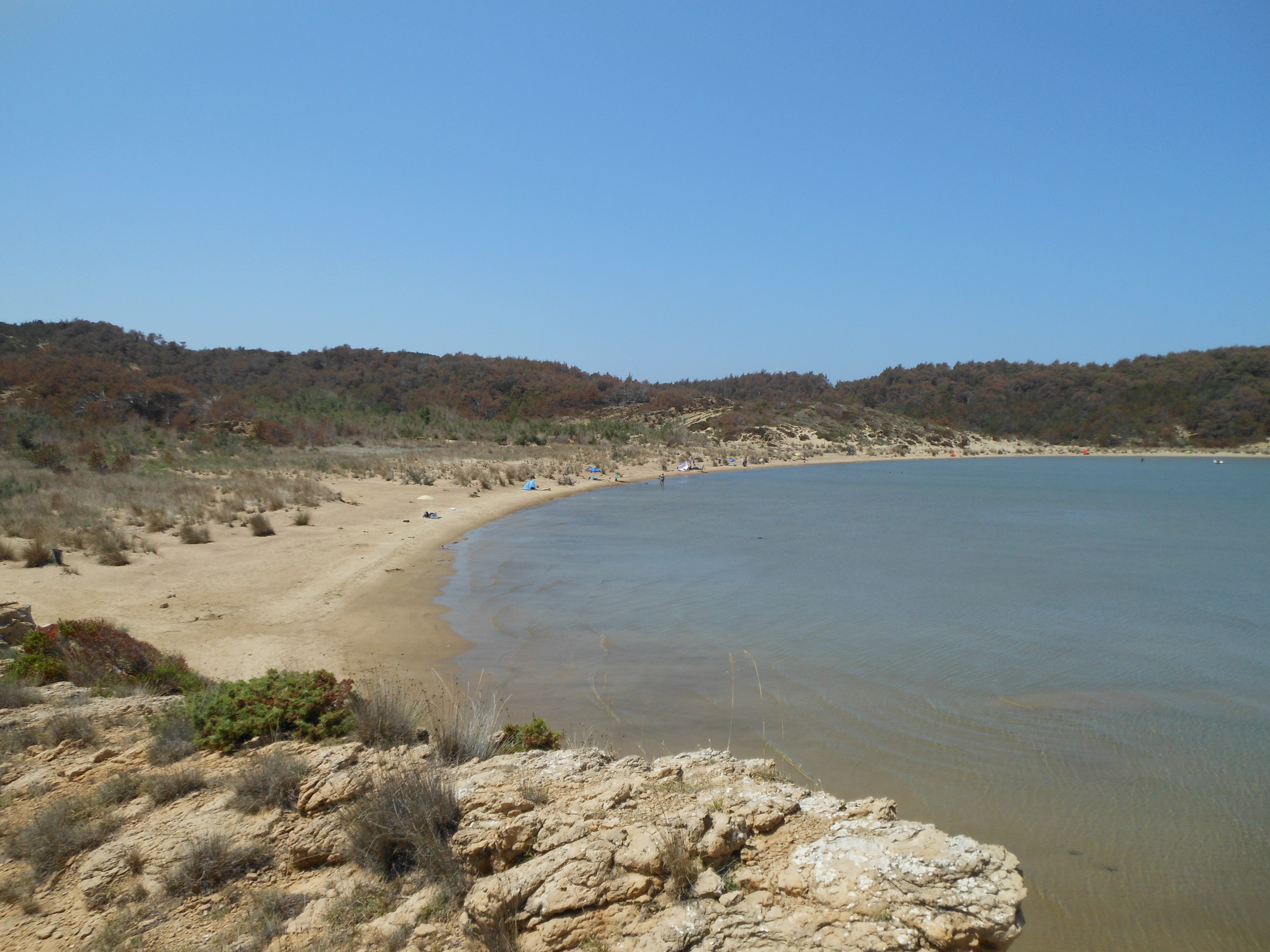
Sahara Beach near Lopar on Island Rab, Croatia

The Sahara Beach is a sandy beach located north of Lopar on the Adriatic island of Rab in the northern part of the Croatian coast.

Next to Sahara Beach are other small beaches, some of which are nude beaches too.
