= Lopar, Croatia =

Lopar
- Municipality
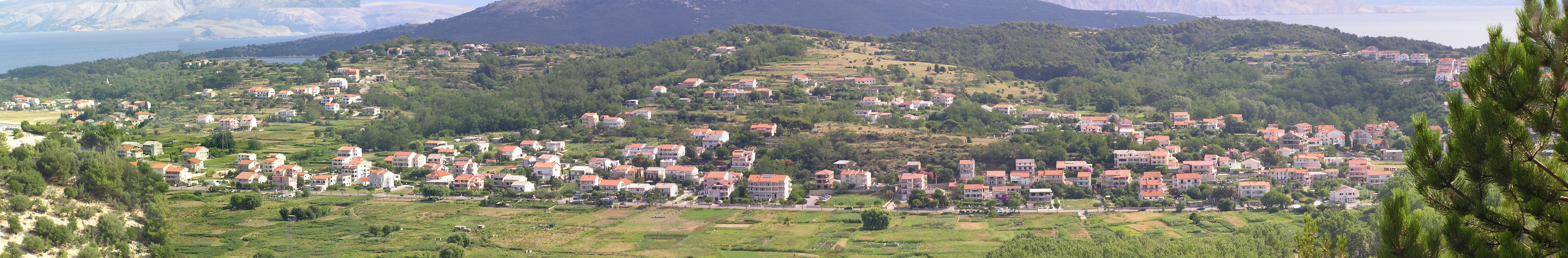
- Town panorama

- Location of Lopar within Croatia
- Coordinates: 44°49′41.63″N 14°44′9.13″E
- Country: Croatia
- County: Primorje-Gorski Kotar County

Government
  - Mayor: Zdenko Jakuc (HDZ)

Area
  - Municipality: 26.2 km^{2} (10.1 sq mi)
  - Urban: 26.2 km^{2} (10.1 sq mi)
- Elevation: 0 m (0 ft)

Population (2021)
  - Municipality: 1,107
  - Density: 42.3/km^{2} (109/sq mi)
  - Urban: 1,107
  - Urban density: 42.3/km^{2} (109/sq mi)
- Time zone: UTC+1 (CET)
  - Summer (DST): UTC+2 (CEST)
- Postal code: 51 281
- Area code: 051
- Website: opcina-lopar.hr

Lopar (Italian: Loparo) is a Croatian municipality of Primorje–Gorski Kotar County. It gained the municipality status in 2006 and its population is 1,263 as of 2011. Lopar is 12 kilometers from the town of Rab and is known for its numerous natural sandy beaches and is surrounded by many islets.

== History ==
On 25 February 2018, it took 29 firefighters from DVD Lopar and 8 from DVD Rab to put out a fire that burned down a house in Rab. A strong bura and very low temperatures complicated efforts, because the water would freeze immediately. The fire was fully put out in the early morning hours.

== Geography ==
The municipality is situated in the northeastern part of the Rab island. Close to its coast there are located the two little islands of Goli otok and Sveti Grgur.

== Notable people ==
Lopar is considered the birthplace of Saint Marinus (born in the island of Rab), the founder of the eponymous republic.

== Tourism ==
Lopar is popular for its sandy beaches like San Marino beach, Rajska ("Paradise") or Sahara Beach.

== Gallery ==
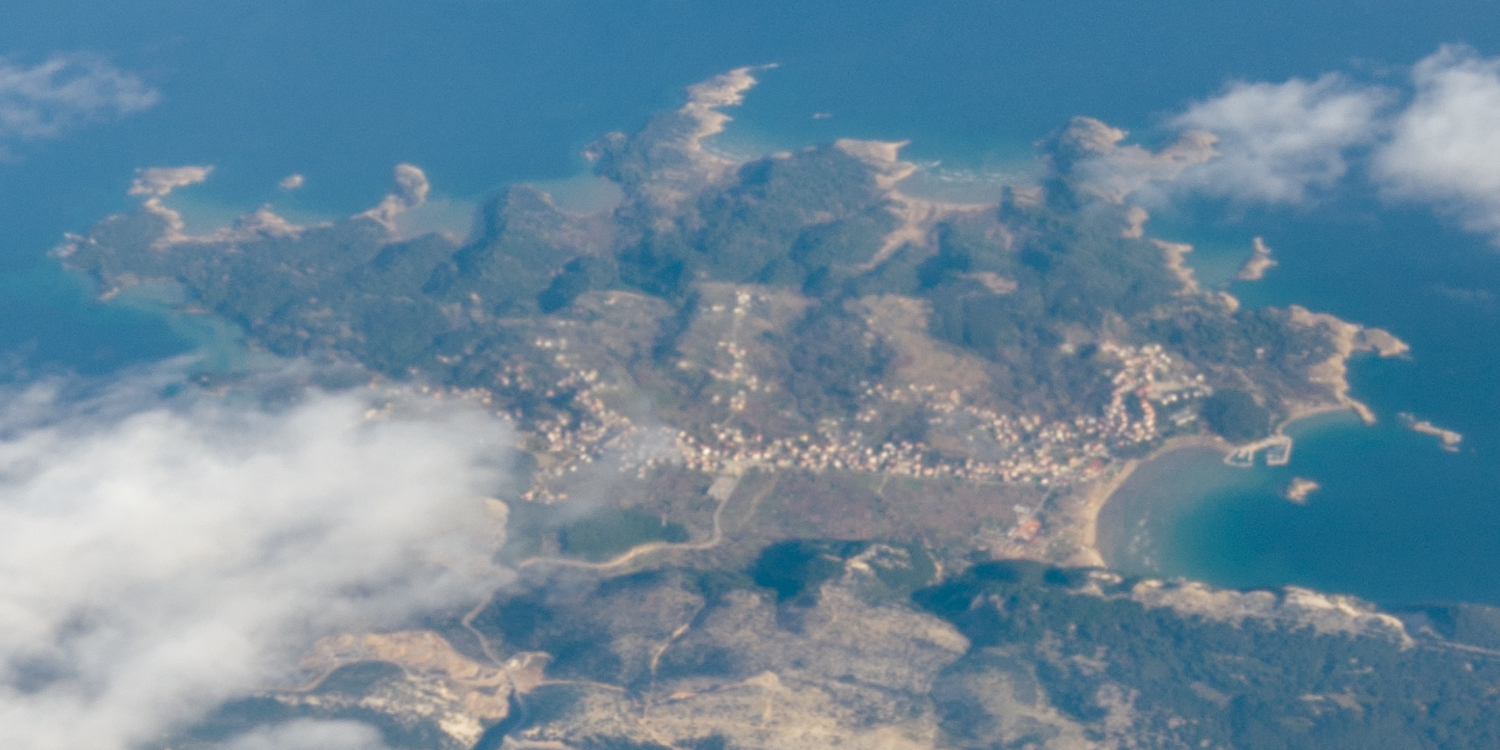
Aerial view

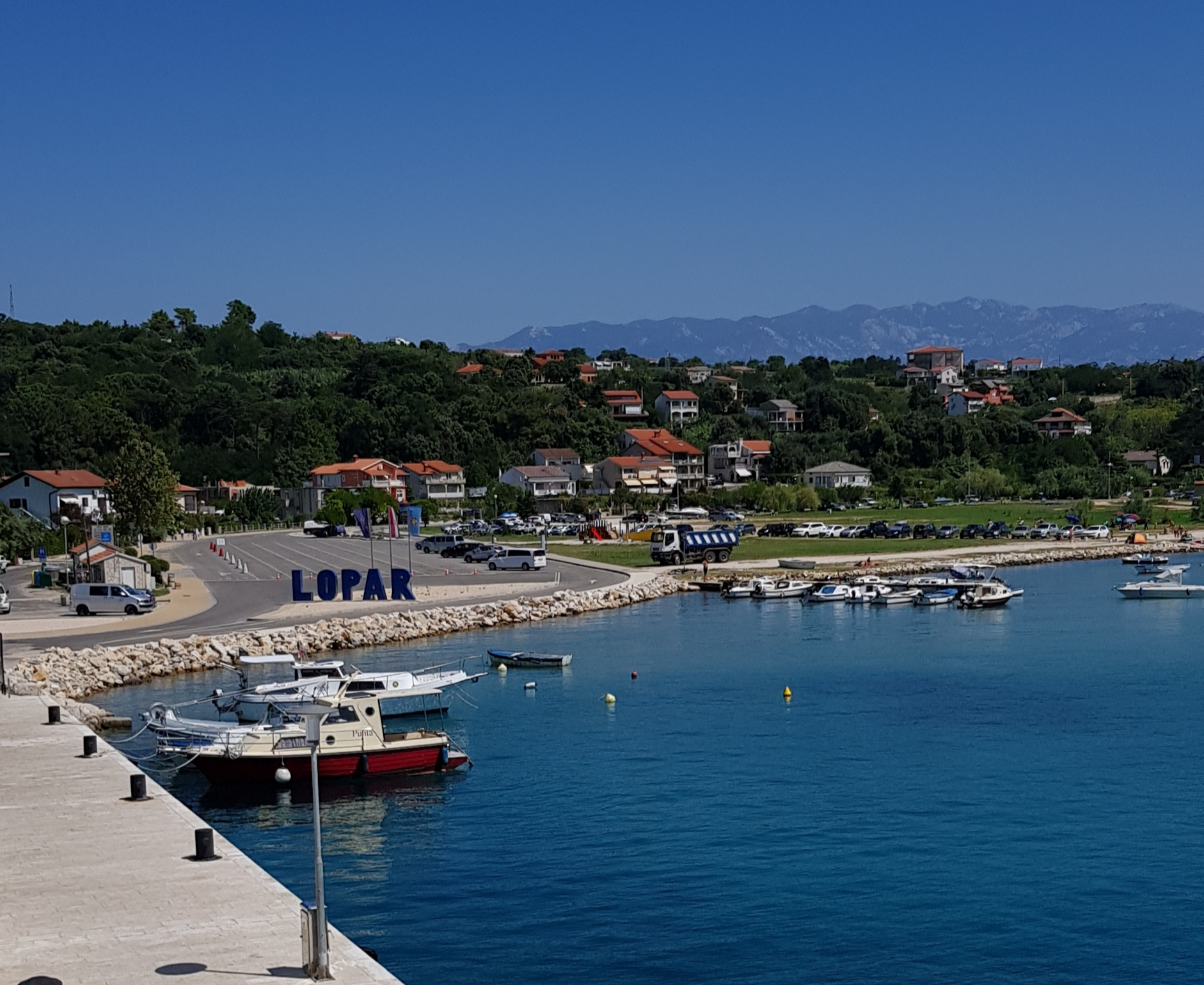
Waterfront

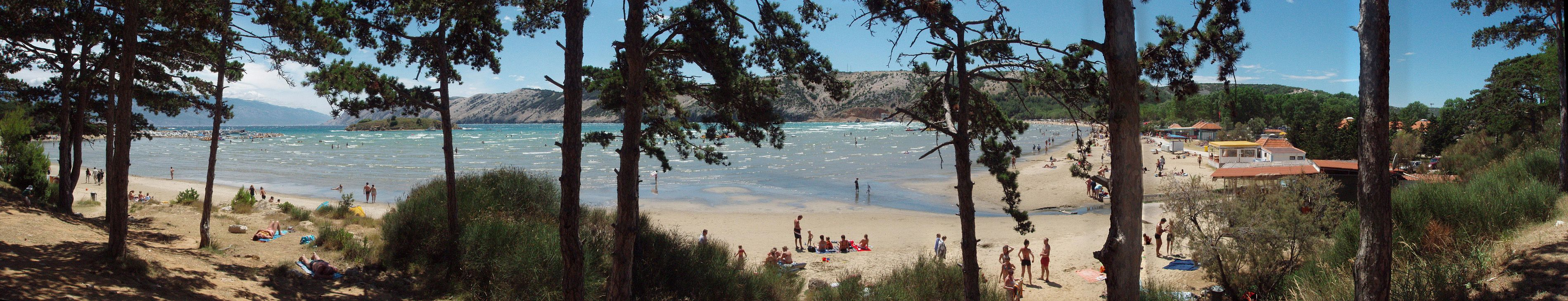
San Marino beach

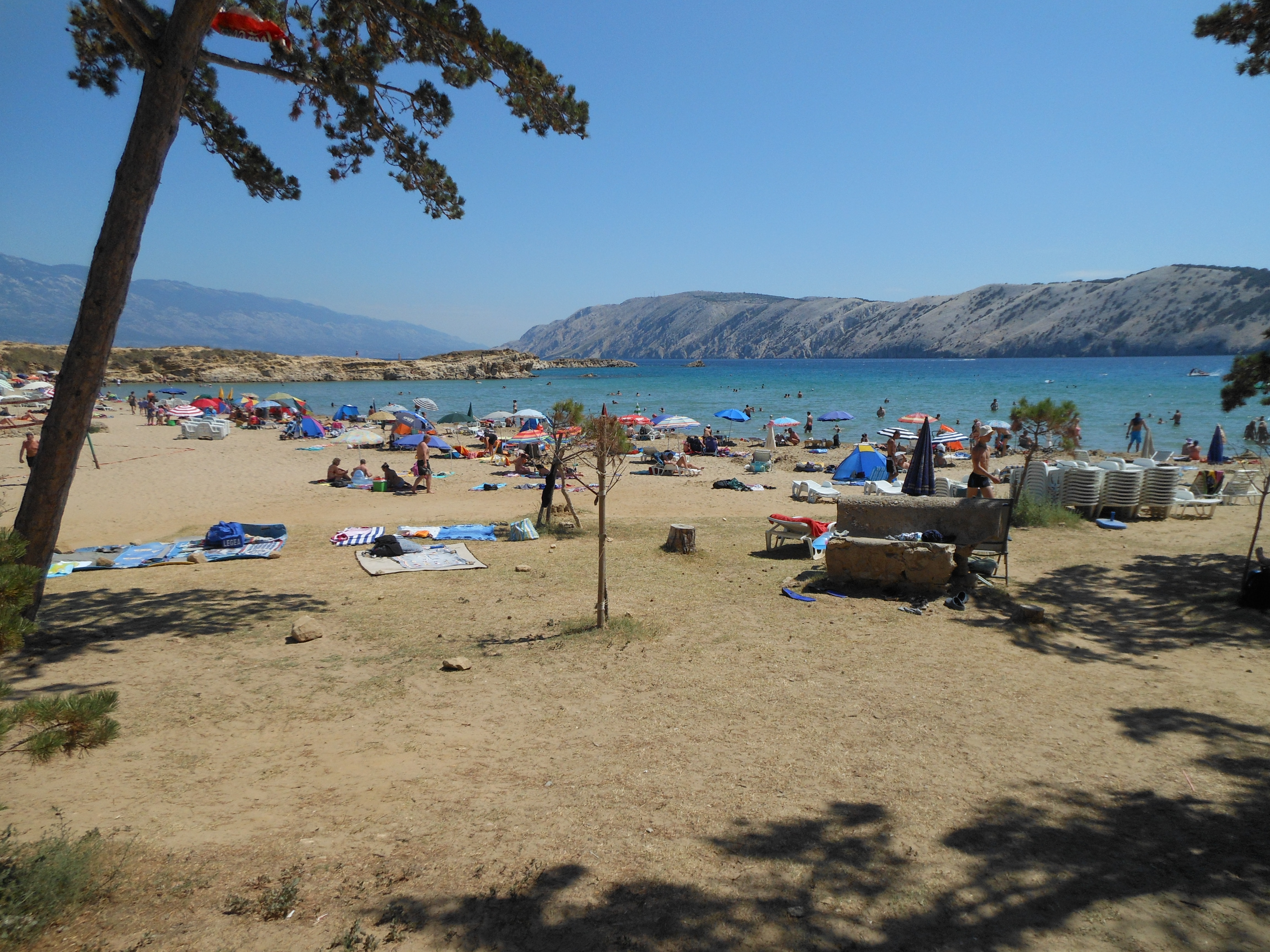
Livacina Beach

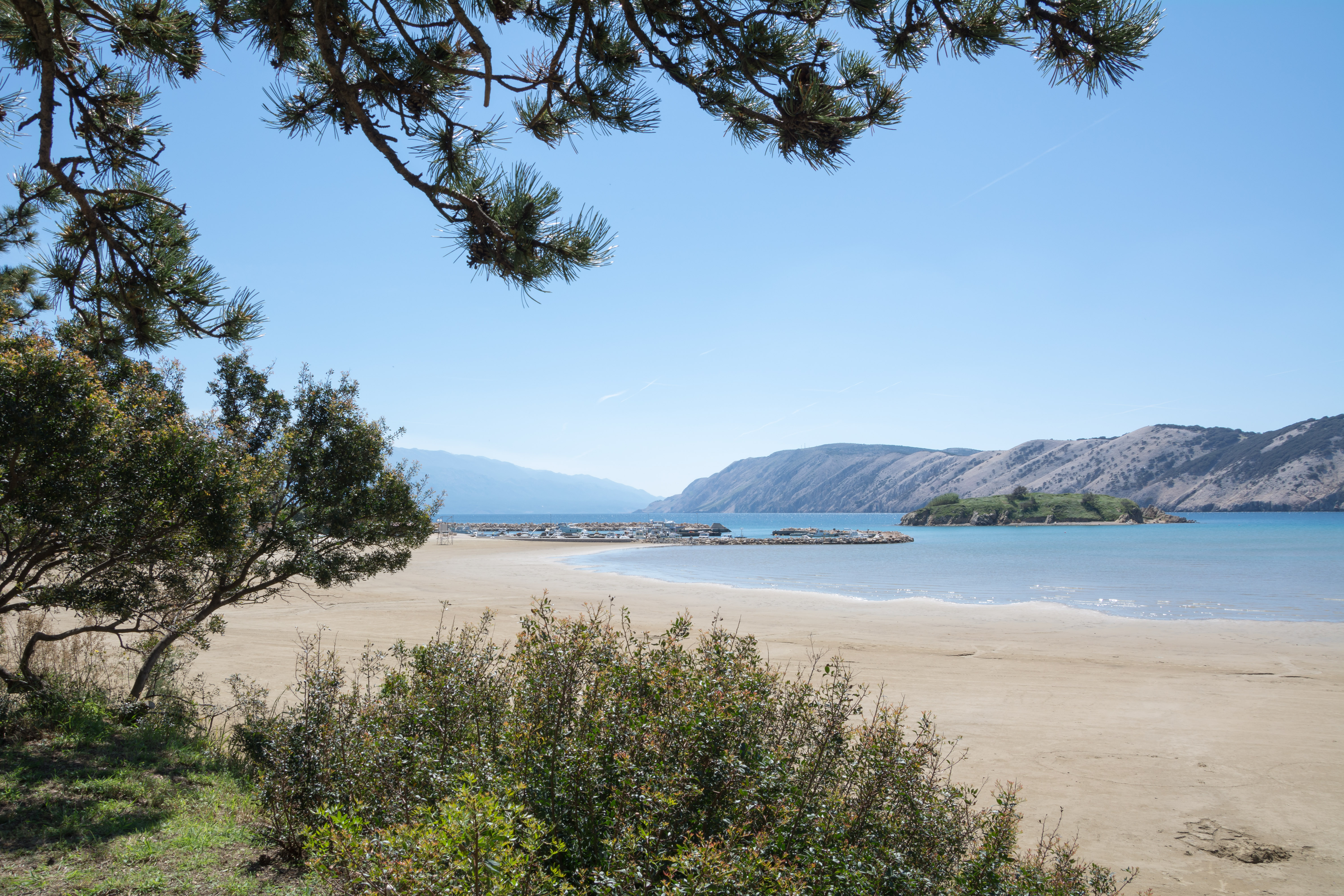
Paradise beach

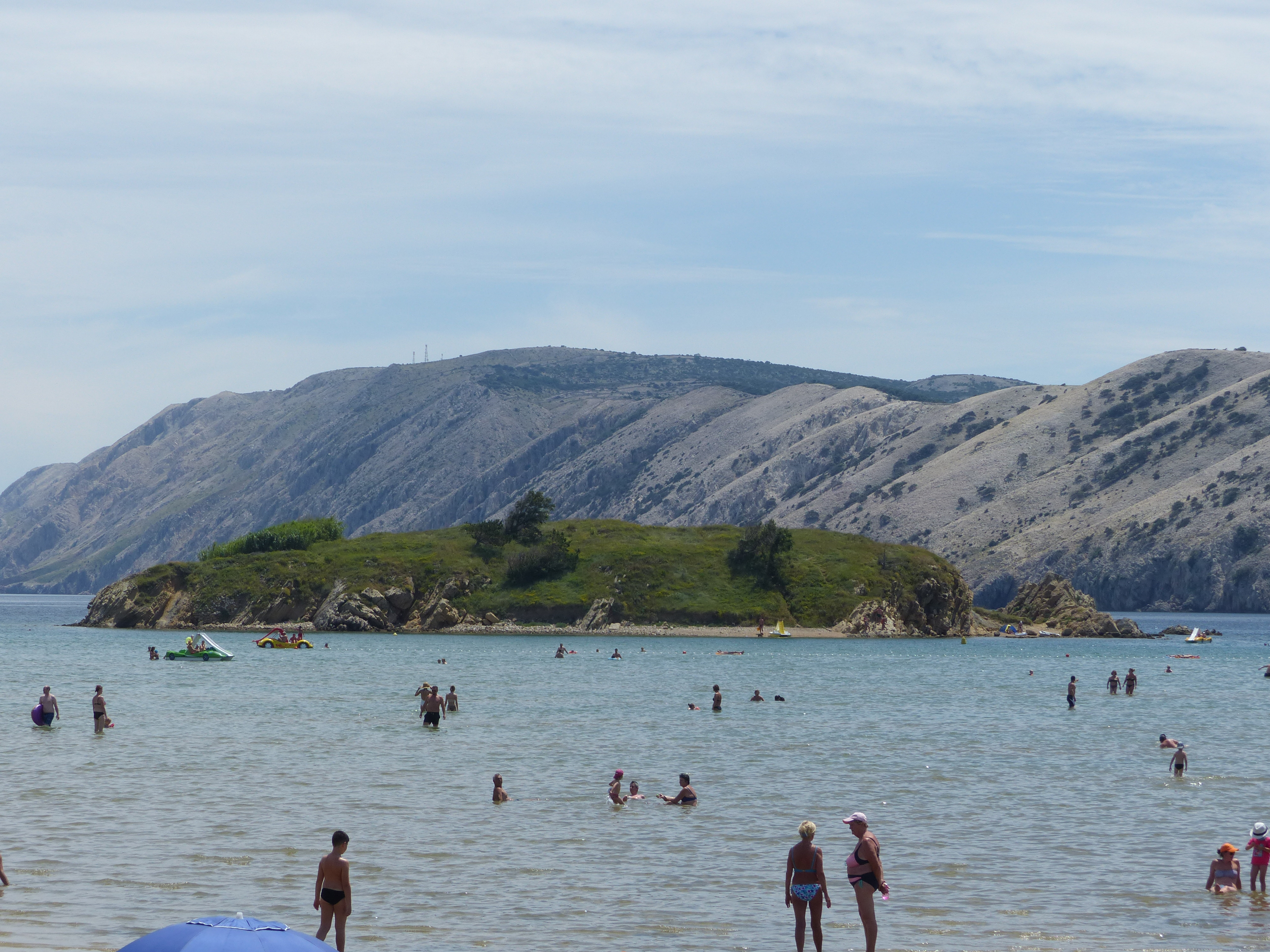
Lukovac island (Paradise side)

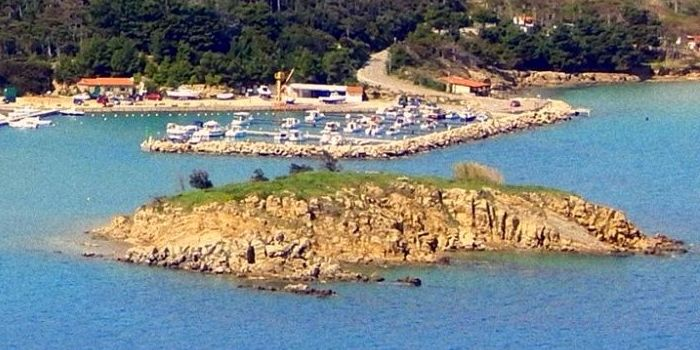
Lukovac (opposite side)

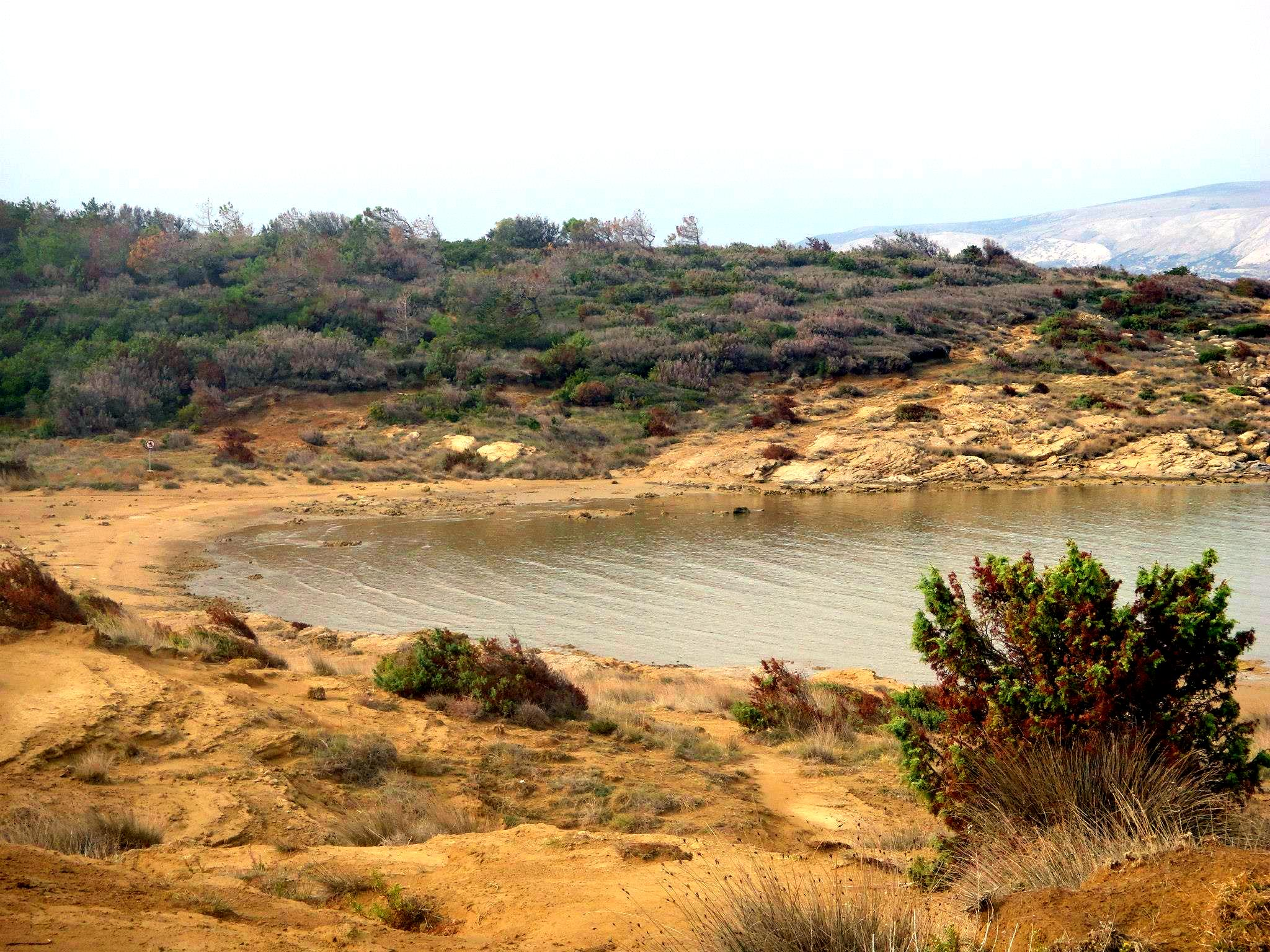
Ciganka beach (inlet)

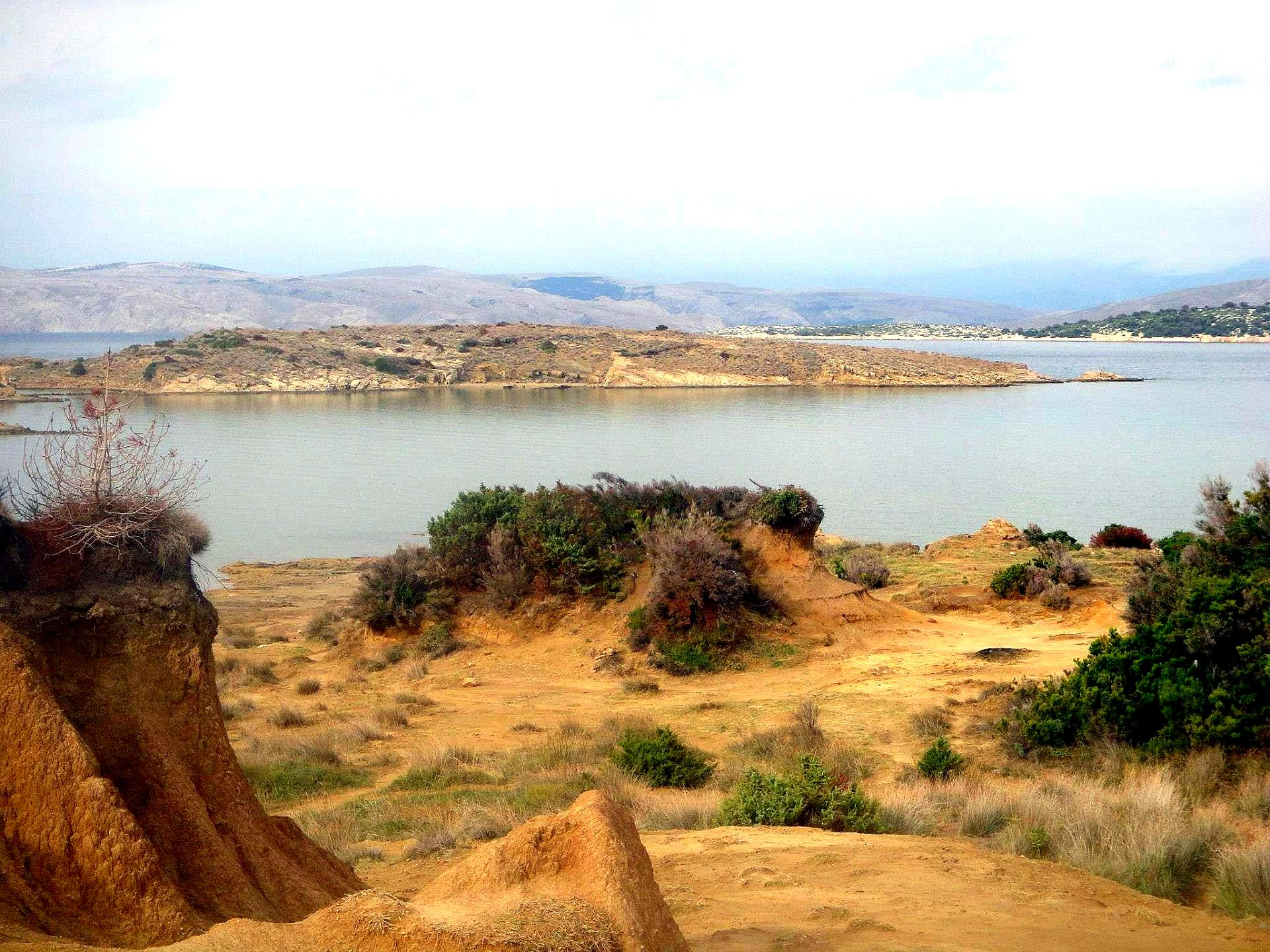
Ciganka beach (outlet)

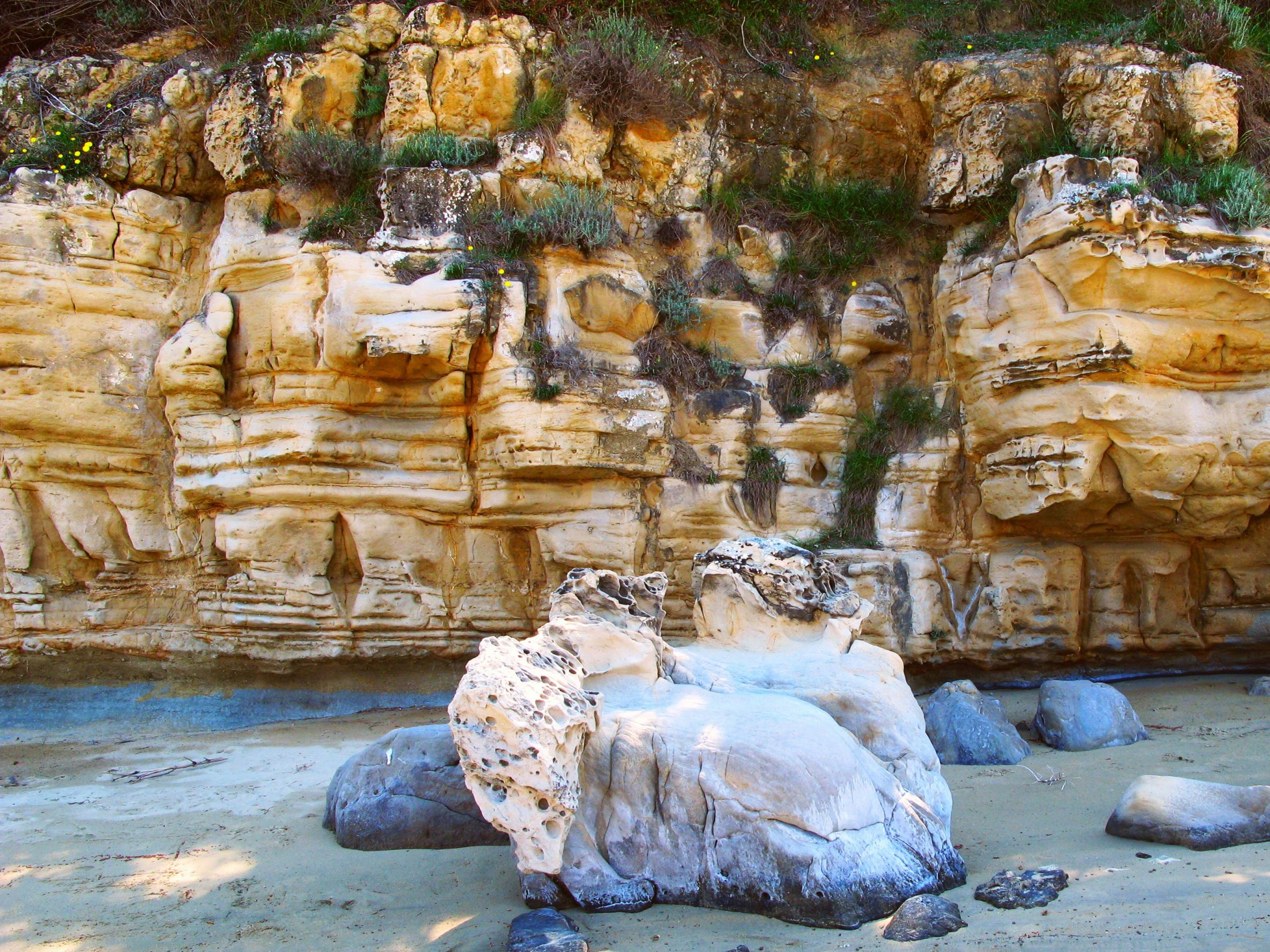
Beach cliffs

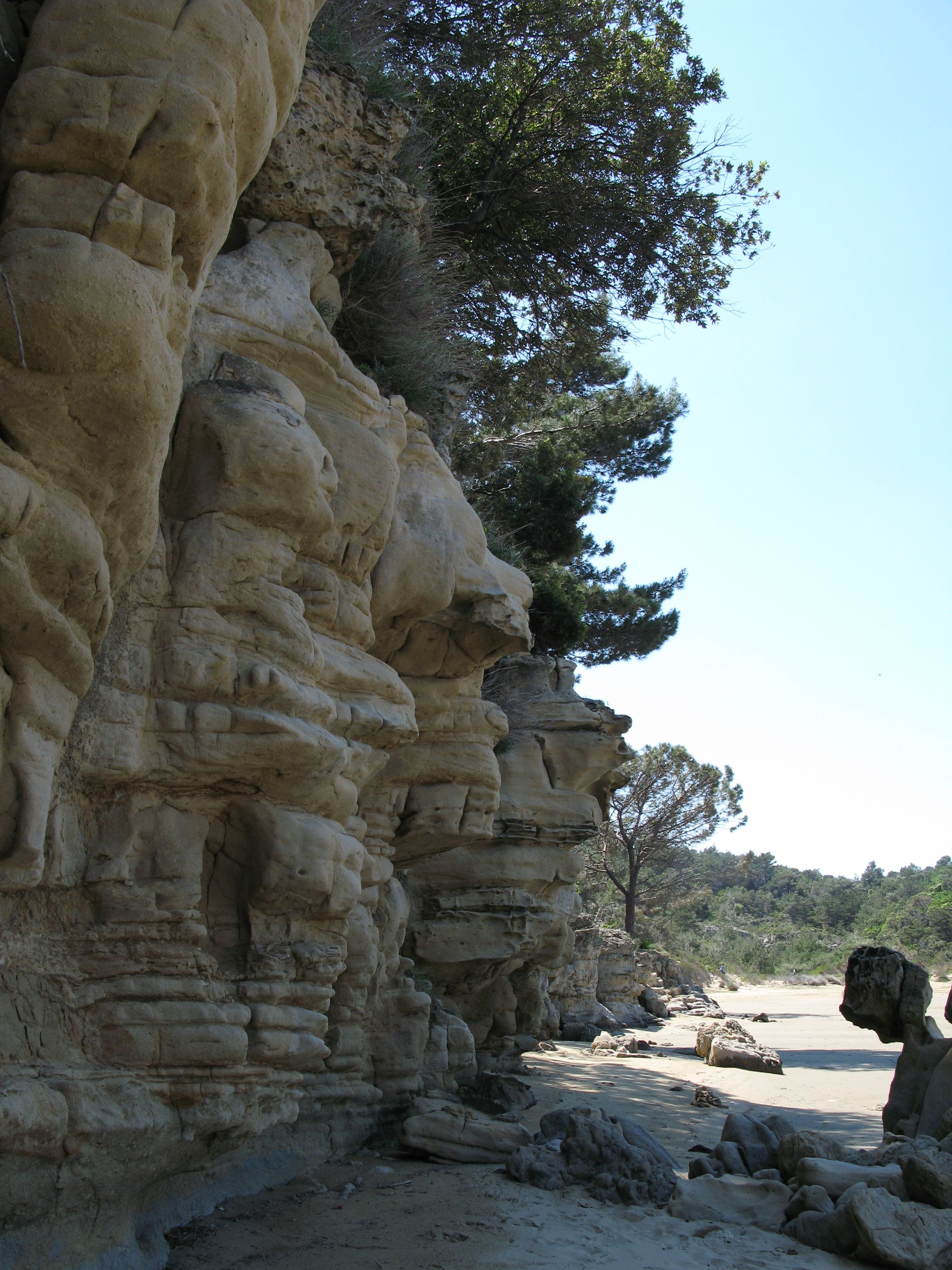
Cliffs (side view)

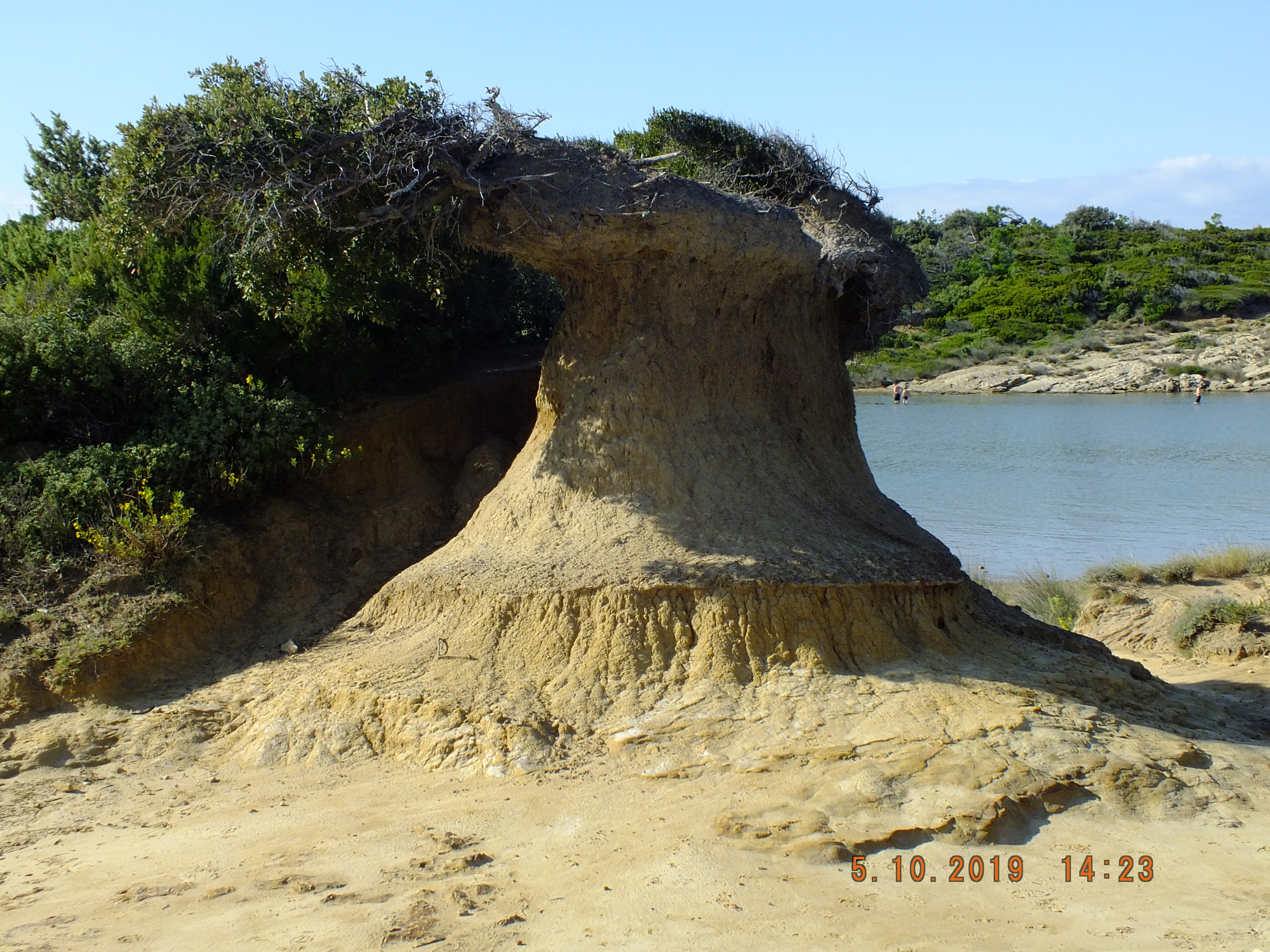
Pyramide

== See also ==
- San Marino, Croatia
