= Mišnjak (Rab) =

Island in Croatia

- Interactive map of Mišnjak

Geography
- Location: Adriatic Sea
- Coordinates: 44°42′17″N 14°51′47″E

Administration
- Croatia

Mišnjak is an islet in Croatia just off the south-eastern end of the island of Rab. The ferry that forms part of the D105 highway passes by it on the way to Stinica.

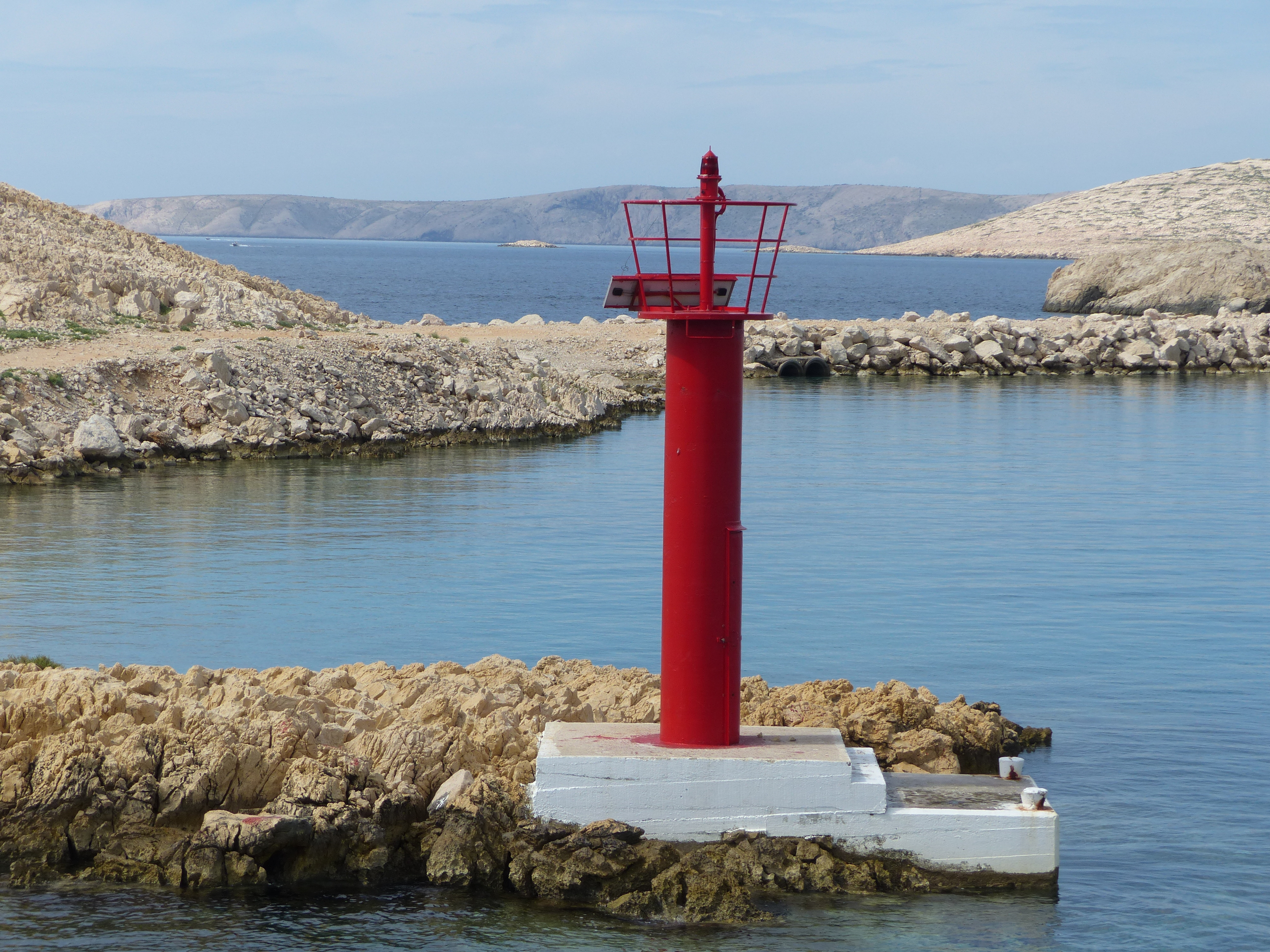
Light beacon on Mišnjak islet at the entrance to Mišnjak port of Rab island; part of the breakwater can be seen on the right, which connects the islet to the main island

The islet is connected to Rab island by a 160-meter breakwater that was built in 1989.

Misnjak is the busiest ferry port on Rab, operating year-round connecting the island to the mainland.
