= Mundanije =

Coordinates: 44°46′N 14°46′E

- Village
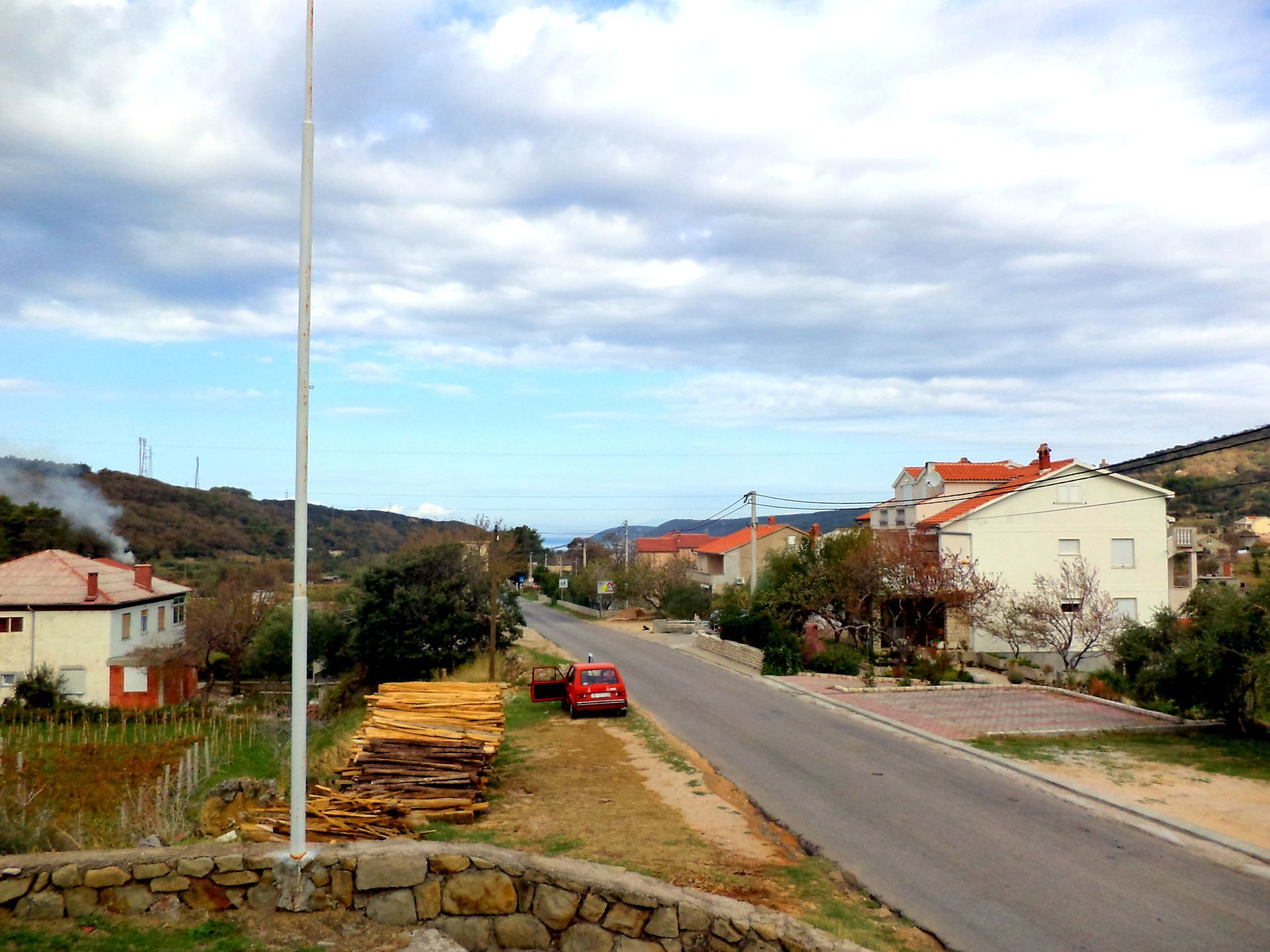
- Interactive map of Mundanije
- Country: Croatia

Area
  - Total: 7.9 km^{2} (3.1 sq mi)

Population (2021)
  - Total: 402
  - Density: 51/km^{2} (130/sq mi)
- Time zone: UTC+1 (CET)
  - Summer (DST): UTC+2 (CEST)

Mundanije is a village in Croatia. It is connected by the D105 highway. The Mundanije have the feast of St. Mathew on September 21, when many cultural and entertainment events take place.
