= Zavratnica =

Coastal inlet in Croatia

- Značajni Krajobraz (Croatian)
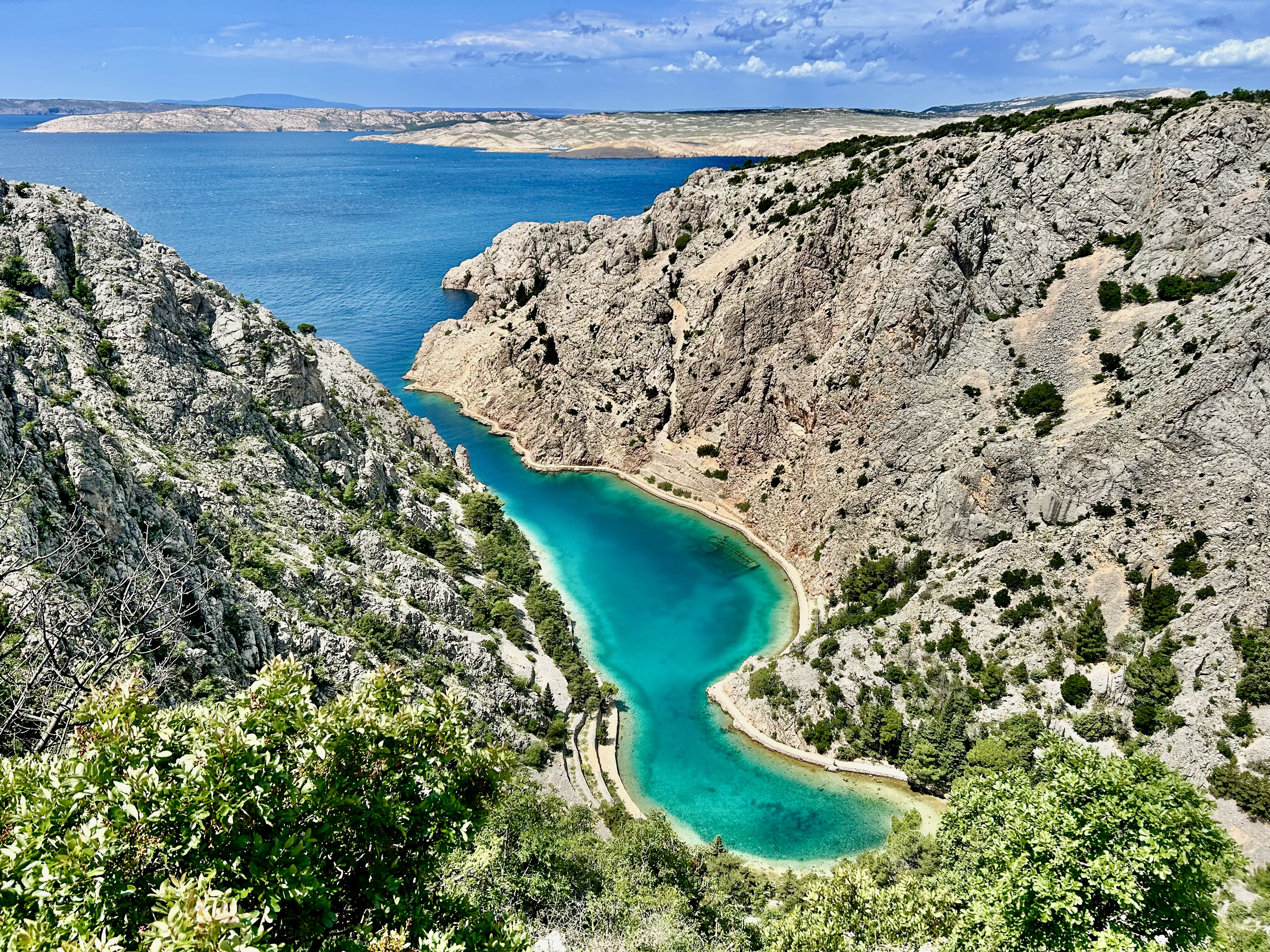
- View of Zavratnica inlet, near Jablanac, in the northern Adriatic coast of Croatia

- Location within Pula Rijeka Sibenik Location within Croatia
- Location: Velebit Nature Park; Jablanac, Lika-Senj County
- Coordinates: 44.699486°N 14.897418°E
- Type: Cove
- Ocean/sea sources: Adriatic Sea
- Basin countries: Croatia
- Max. length: 900 metres (3,000 ft)
- Max. width: 50–150 metres (160–490 ft)
- Max. depth: 5–18 metres (16–59 ft)
- Uvala Zavratnica
- IUCN category V (protected landscape/seascape)
- Area: 0.9 km^{2} (0.35 sq mi)
- Designated: 2014

Zavratnica is a 900 metres (3,000 ft) long narrow inlet located at the foot of the Velebit Mountains, in the northern part of the Adriatic Sea, 1 kilometre (0.62 mi) south of Jablanac, Croatia. Regarded as one of the major tourist attractions of the northern coastal area because of its beauty, Zavratnica was designated a protected landscape in 1964.

== Description ==
Zavratnica is 50–150 metres (160–490 ft) wide, with a narrow entrance, and up to 100 metres (330 ft) sides which are very steep. It only resembles a fjord. Its geological origin is very different from the formation of fjords. A mountain stream became flooded as the surface of the sea rose (transgression after the last ice age), and so a cove was formed quite similar in appearance to a fjord.

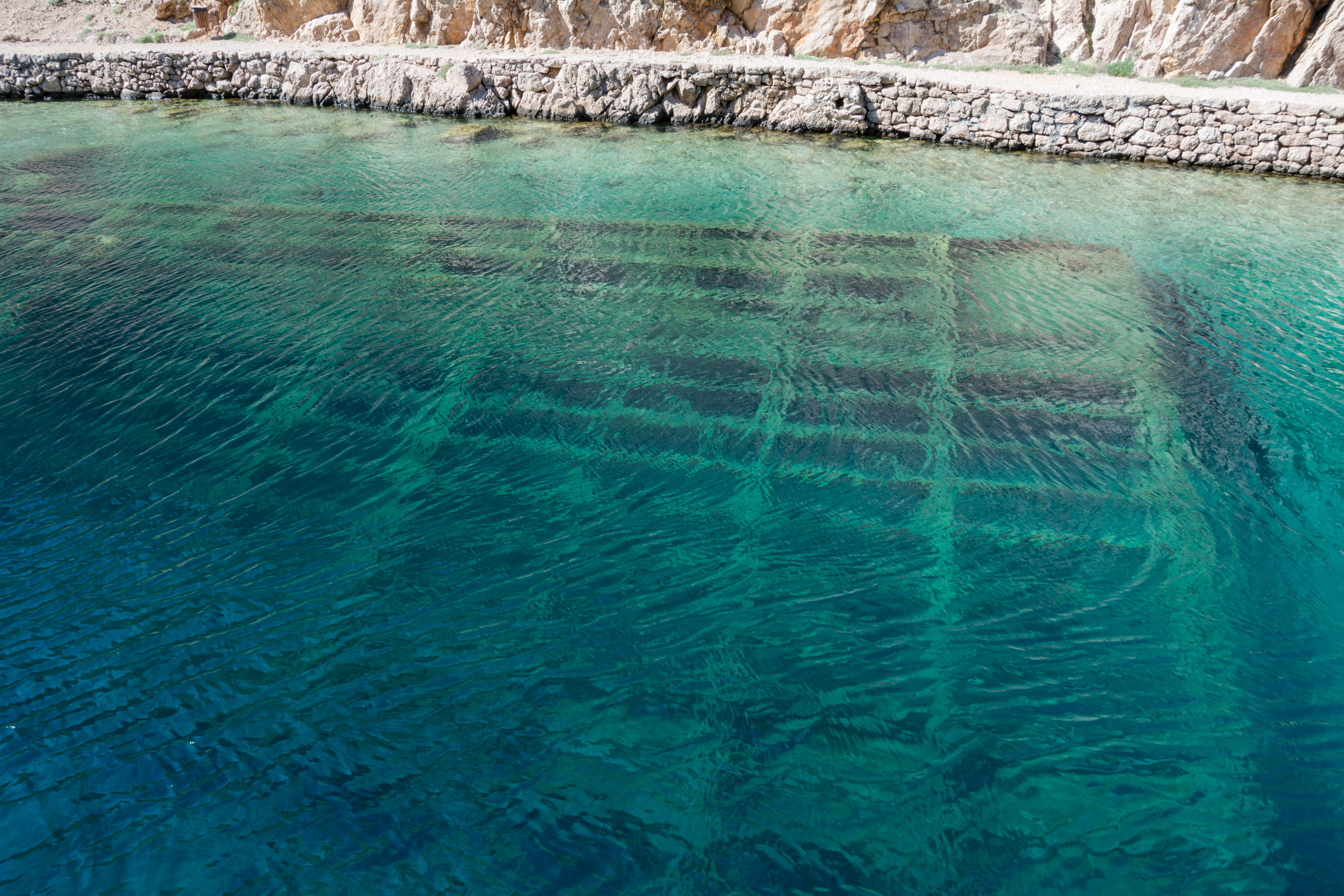
zavratnica wreck of a ship from WWII

== See also ==
- Jablanac
