= Supetarska Draga =

Coordinates: 44°48′N 14°43′E

- Village
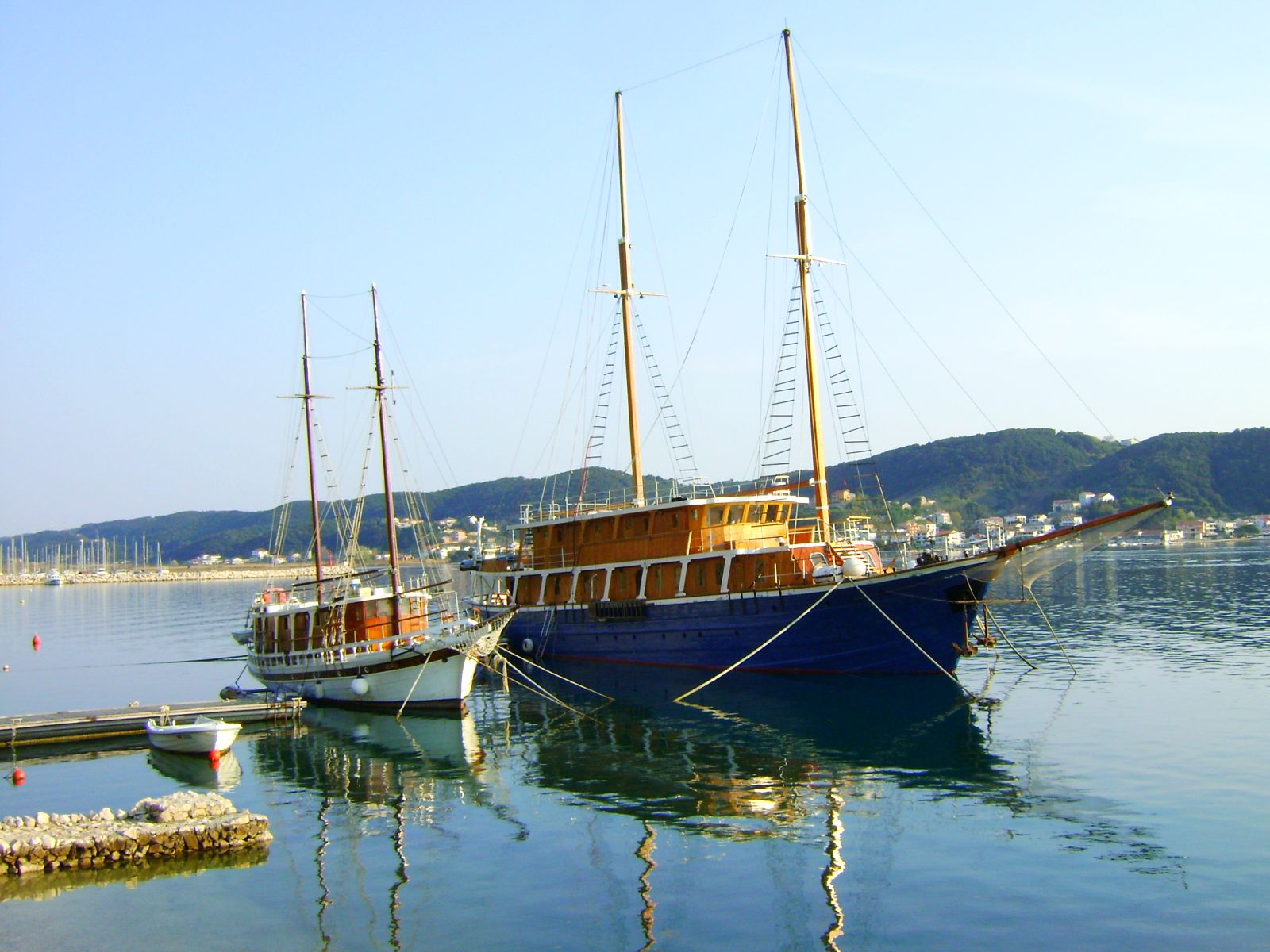
- Sailboats in Supetarska Draga, Croatia.
- Interactive map of Supetarska Draga
- Country: Croatia

Area
  - Total: 11.0 km^{2} (4.2 sq mi)

Population (2021)
  - Total: 937
  - Density: 85.2/km^{2} (221/sq mi)
- Time zone: UTC+1 (CET)
  - Summer (DST): UTC+2 (CEST)

Supetarska Draga is a village in Croatia. It is connected by the D105 highway. The oldest Benedictine abbey on the island is located in Supetarska Draga.
