= San Marino, Croatia =

San Marino
- Hamlet
- Country: Croatia
- County: Primorje-Gorski Kotar County
- Municipality: Lopar
- Time zone: UTC+1 (CET)
  - Summer (DST): UTC+2 (CEST)

San Marino is a hamlet and a ferry port near Lopar, Croatia on the island of Rab. The port (Trajektna luka San Marino) connects to Goli otok.
