= Jablanac =

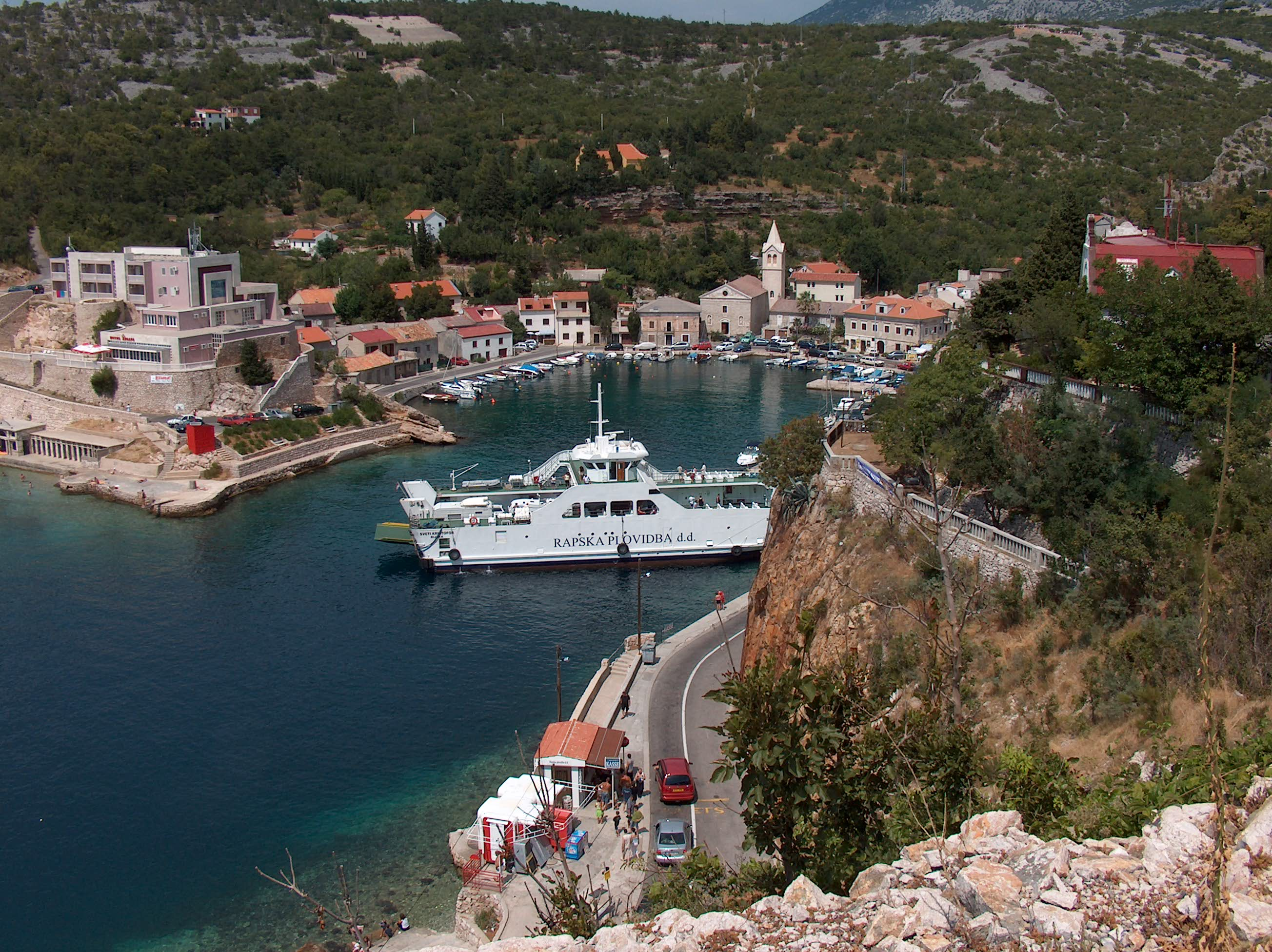
- Port of Jablanac

- Location within Croatia
- Coordinates: 44.7067°N 14.8956°E
- Country: Croatia
- County: Lika-Senj
- City: Senj

Area
  - Total: 54.0 km^{2} (20.8 sq mi)

Population (2021)
  - Total: 53
  - Density: 0.98/km^{2} (2.5/sq mi)
- Time zone: UTC+1 (CET)
  - Summer (DST): UTC+2 (CEST)

Jablanac is a village in Lika-Senj County, Croatia, located on the Adriatic Sea underneath the Velebit mountain, overlooking the island of Rab. The village used to have a ferry port that connected it to Rab, but that moved up the coast to Stinica in July 2012. The population of Jablanac is 83 (2011) and it is located in the municipality of Senj (which lies to the north).

Local attractions include Zavratnica inlet where you can see a sunken military ferry wreck from WW2 and stunning scenery. Nearby is the Velebit mountain and the Northern Velebit National Park.

== Name ==
Jablanac is also the name of the former village of Jablanac Jasenovački, as well as a canal that runs into Lake Vrana, and the northernmost cape and bay on the island of Cres. It is also a toponym near Benčani in Viškovo.
