= Stinica =

Settlement in Lika-Senj County, Croatia

- Settlement
- Interactive map of Stinica
- Location of Stinica in Croatia
- Coordinates: 44°44′24″N 14°53′56″E
- Country: Croatia
- County: Lika-Senj
- City: Senj

Area
  - Total: 89.9 km^{2} (34.7 sq mi)

Population (2021)
  - Total: 61
  - Density: 0.68/km^{2} (1.8/sq mi)
- Time zone: UTC+1 (CET)
  - Summer (DST): UTC+2 (CEST)
- Postal code: 53270 Senj
- Area code: +385 (0)53

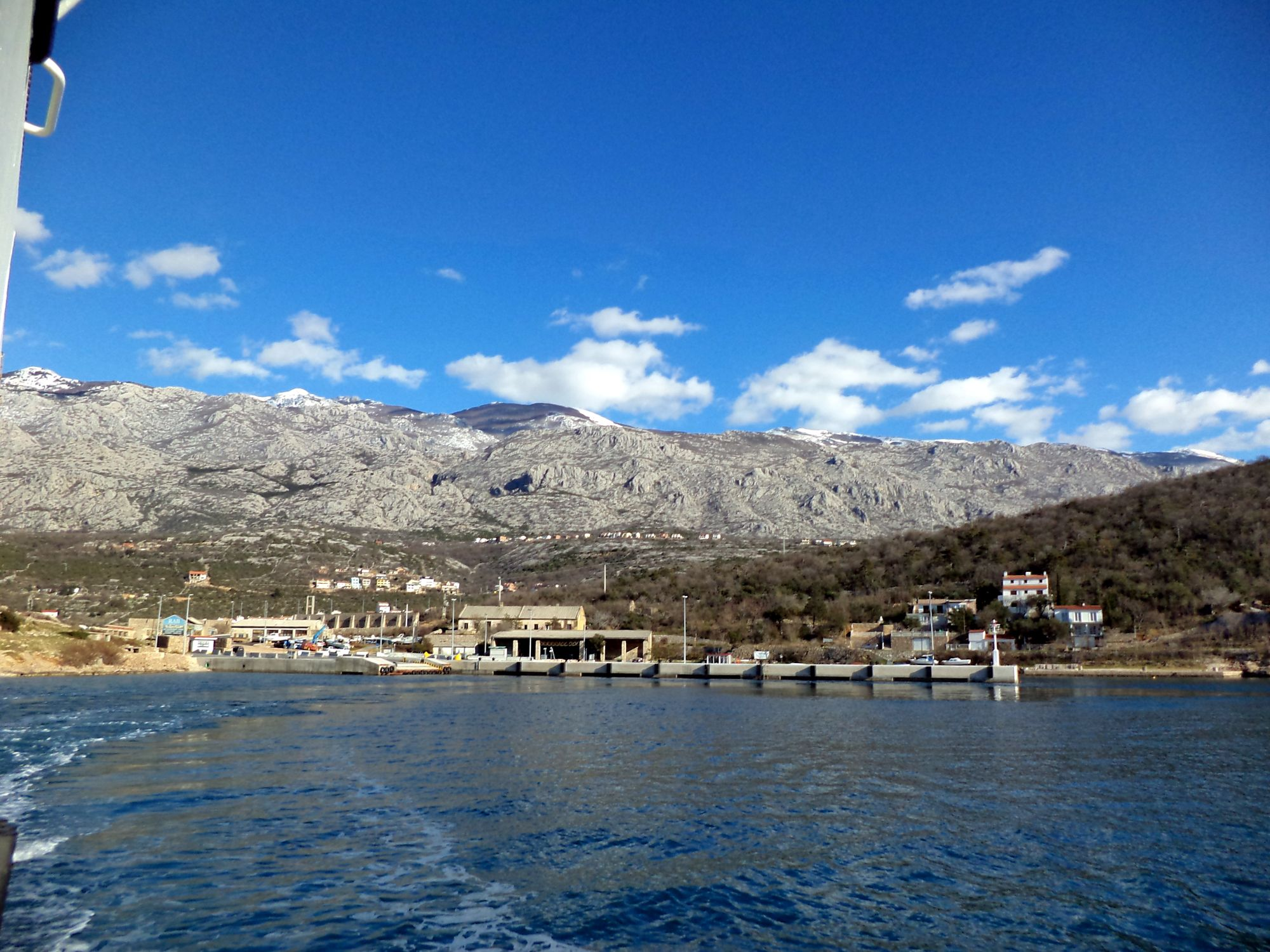
Stinica - ferry port & Velebit mountain

Stinica is a settlement in the City of Senj in Croatia. In 2021, its population was 61.

== Demographics ==
Stinica: Population trends 1857–2021
v

population	747	1106	1062	1032	1345	1335	1270	1028	922	868	652	288	229	145	105	73	61
	1857	1869	1880	1890	1900	1910	1921	1931	1948	1953	1961	1971	1981	1991	2001	2011	2021

Sources: Croatian Bureau of Statistics publications
