= Banjol =

- Village
- Interactive map of Banjol
- Location of Lopar within Croatia
- Coordinates: 44°45′11″N 14°46′27″E
- Country: Croatia
- County: Primorje-Gorski Kotar

Area
  - Total: 3.3 sq mi (8.6 km^{2})

Population (2021)
  - Total: 1,708
  - Density: 510/sq mi (200/km^{2})
- Time zone: UTC+1 (CET)
  - Summer (DST): UTC+2 (CEST)

Banjol is a village in Croatia. Banjol is known for the feast of its patron Saint Lucia, locally known as "Šištovica".
