= Kampor =

Coordinates: 44°47′24″N 14°42′37″E

- Village
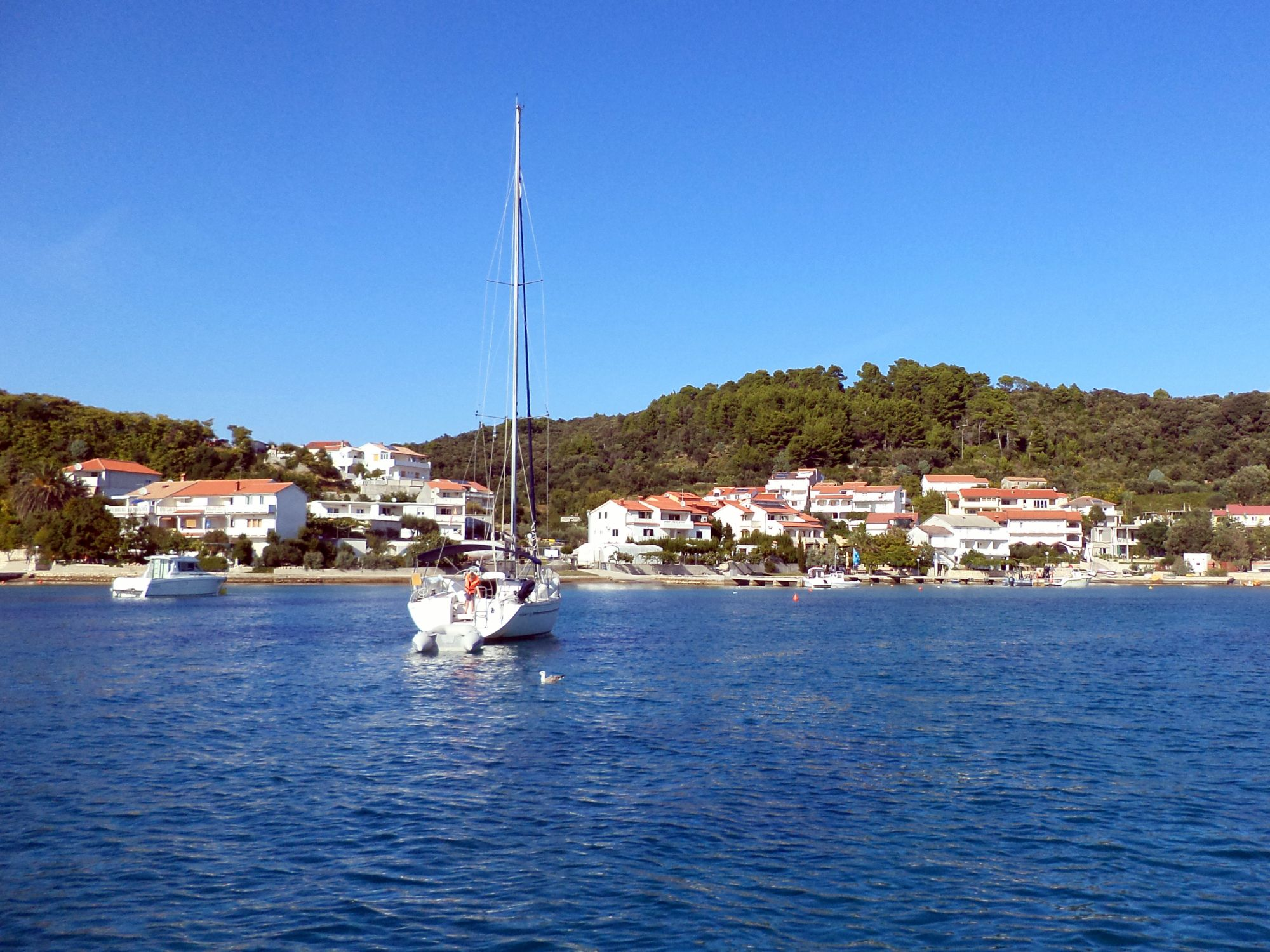
- Kampor
- Interactive map of Kampor
- Country: Croatia

Area
  - Total: 22.0 km^{2} (8.5 sq mi)

Population (2021)
  - Total: 1,030
  - Density: 46.8/km^{2} (121/sq mi)
- Time zone: UTC+1 (CET)
  - Summer (DST): UTC+2 (CEST)

Kampor is a village in Croatia. Kampor holds its local festivities on Easter Monday, as well as on the feast of St. Euphemia on September 16.

== History ==
During World War II, the Rab concentration camp was built near the village. After the war, a memorial was built at this location by the Slovenian architect Edvard Ravnikar.
