= Rab (island) =

Island in Croatia

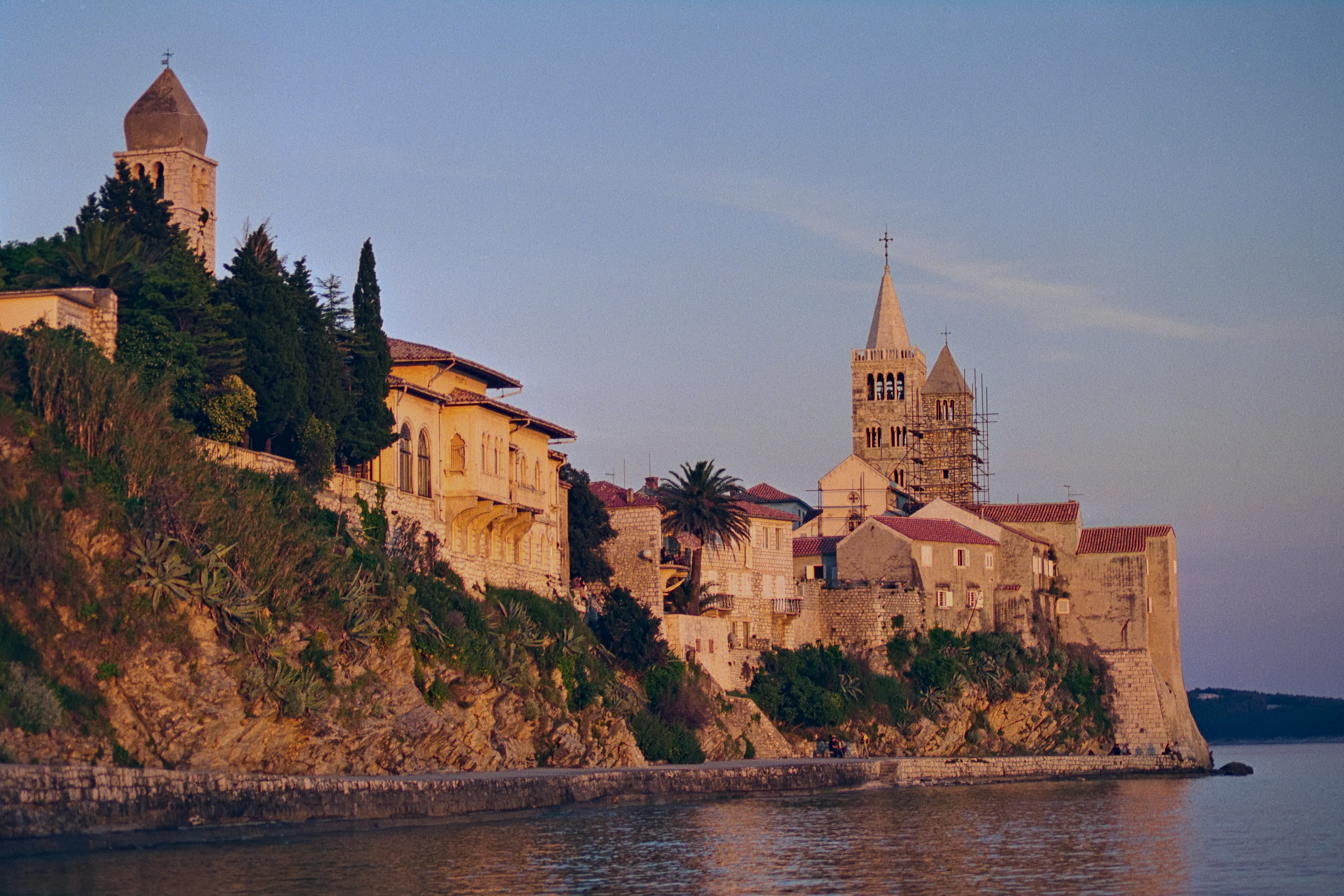
- Historic town center of Rab
- Interactive map of Rab

Geography
- Location: Adriatic Sea
- Coordinates: 44°46′59.88″N 14°45′6.84″E
- Area: 86.115 km^{2} (33.249 sq mi)
- Highest elevation: 408 m (1339 ft)
- Highest point: Kamenjak

Administration
- Croatia
- County: Primorje-Gorski Kotar County
- Largest settlement: Palit (pop. 1,580)

Demographics
- Population: 7,161 (2021)
- Pop. density: 83.156/km^{2} (215.373/sq mi)

Rab (Croatian: [ɾâːb]) is an island in the Primorje-Gorski Kotar County in Croatia, located just off the northern Croatian coast in the Adriatic Sea.

The island is 22 km (14 mi) long, has an area of 93.6 km^{2} (36 sq mi) and 7,161 inhabitants (2021). The main settlement on the island is the eponymous town of Rab, although the neighboring village of Palit has the biggest population. The highest peak is Kamenjak at 408 m. The northeastern side of the island is mostly barren, karst, while the southwestern side is covered by one of the last oak forests of the Mediterranean.

Ferries connect the island of Rab with the mainland port of Stinica and with the neighbouring islands of Krk and Pag. European Coastal Airlines offered multiple daily connections by seaplane from Rab to Zagreb and to Rijeka via Rijeka Airport in Omišalj on the neighboring island of Krk, until it ceased operations in 2016.

== Name ==
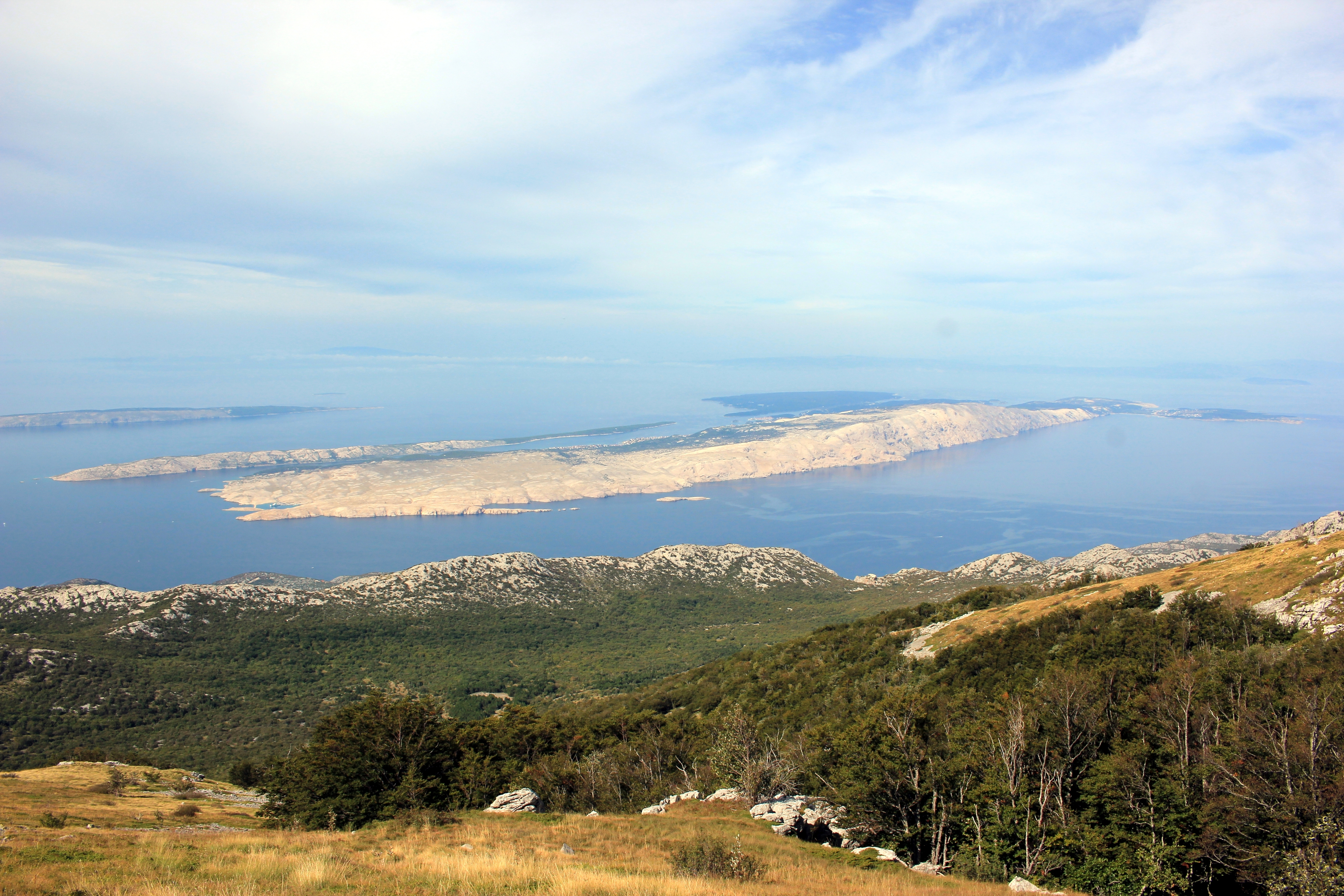
The island as seen from Velebit mountains

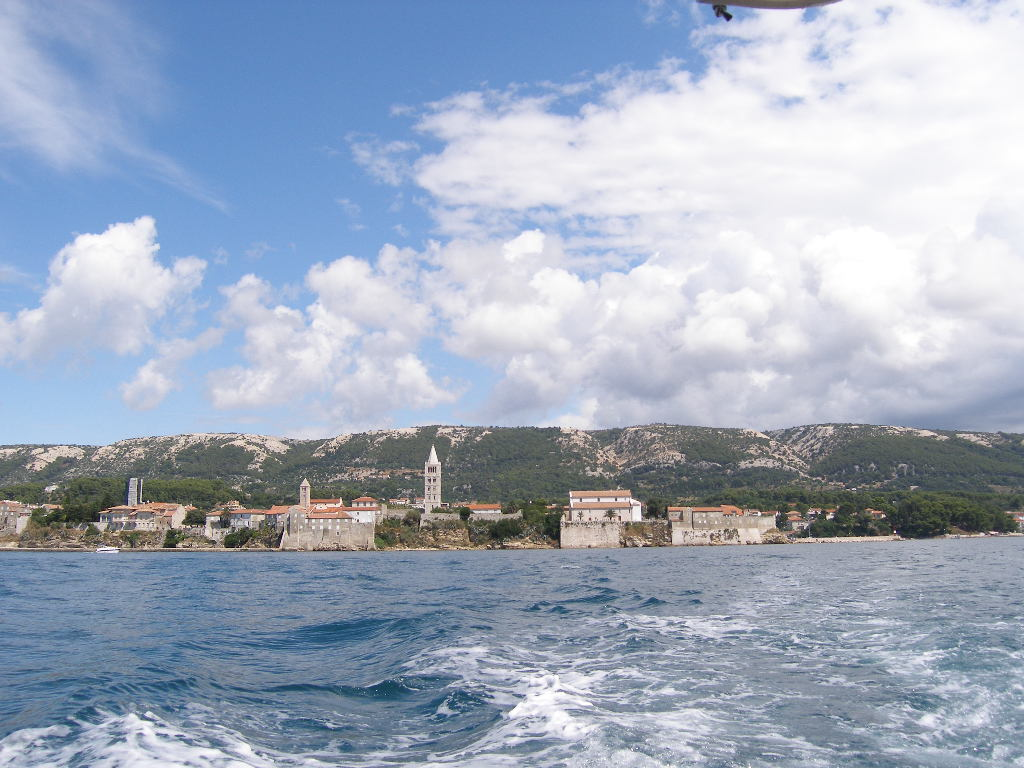
Rab (town)

The island of Rab was first mentioned in a Greek source Periplus of Pseudo-Scylax (360 BC) and then by other Greek and Roman geographists by the name Arba. That name belonged to the Liburnians, so far the oldest known inhabitants of the island. Arba was also the name of the Liburnian settlement in the modern city of Rab. It is not certain how old this name is; it may be as old as the settlement, which means from the beginning of the Iron Age since the Liburnians did not build the city walls on the island. The Illyrian-Liburnian word Arb meant 'dark, obscure, green, forested'. Therefore, name Arba should be comprehended as a toponym meaning "Black island", due to the rich pine forests that once grew on the island.

After the 1st century AD, it was recorded by many other Greek and Roman authors by the names Arba and Arva.

Its Medieval Dalmatian-speaking population used Arbe, Arbia, Arbiana, Arbitana and most frequently Arbum in the documents written in the Latin.

Arbe became also the Venetian name of the city in the 15th century when it fell under the authority of the Republic of Venice.

In Croatian it became Rab, a form which probably goes back as far as the 7th century when the Slavs began to settle on the island. However, the first record of the name Rab is preserved only in the middle of the 15th century (in a Latin document relating to the establishment of the Franciscan monastery of St. Eufemija), since the major establishment of Croatian inhabitants in the city did not occur before the 10th century, unlike the rest of the island and region.

== History ==
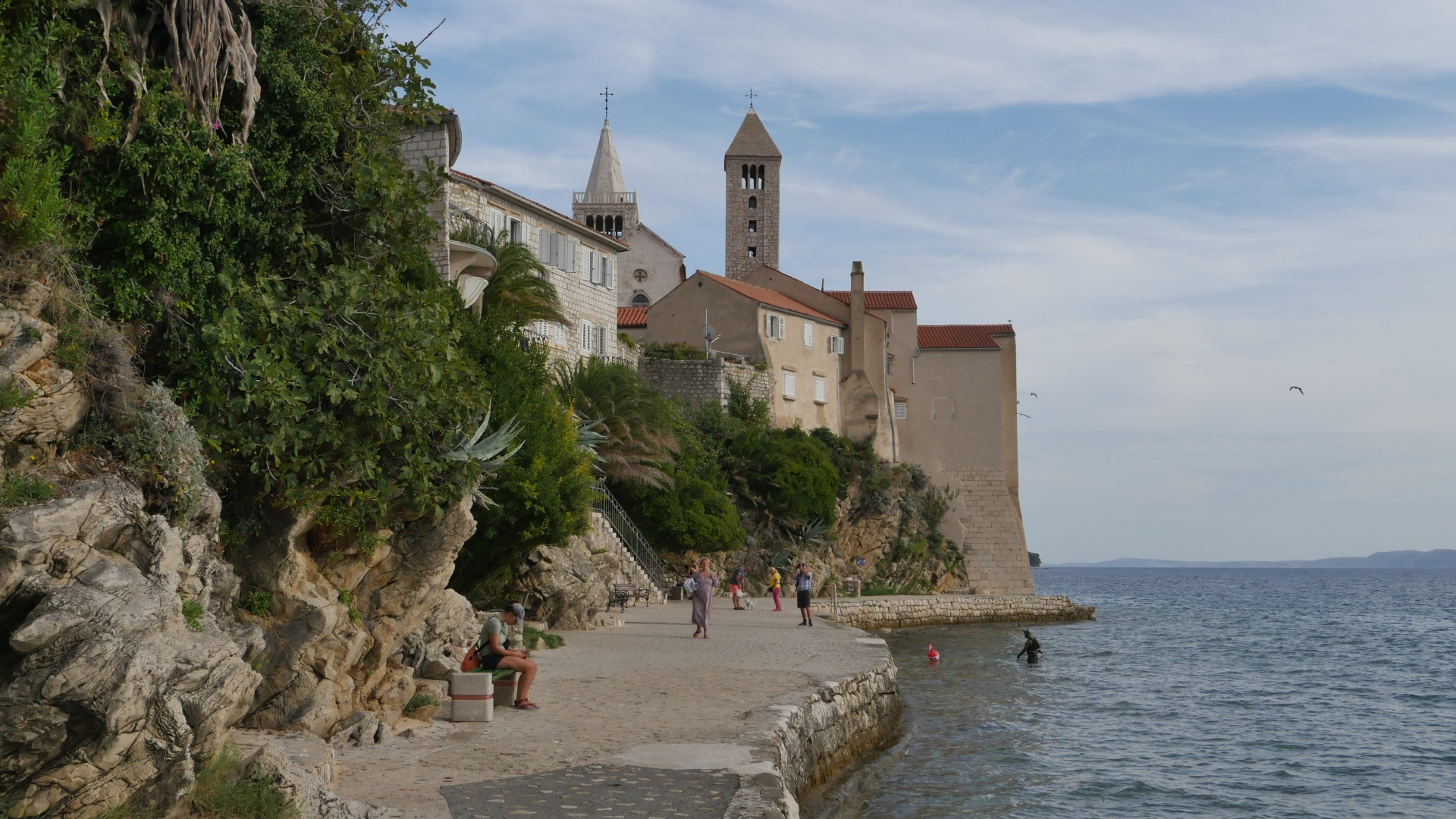
Town of Rab, and Cathedral of the Assumption of the Blessed Virgin Mary

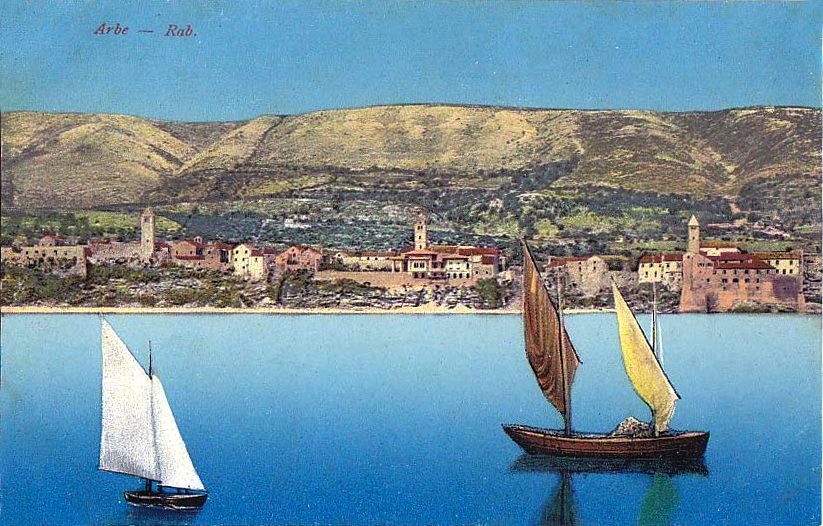
Rab on a 1905 postcard of Purger & Co

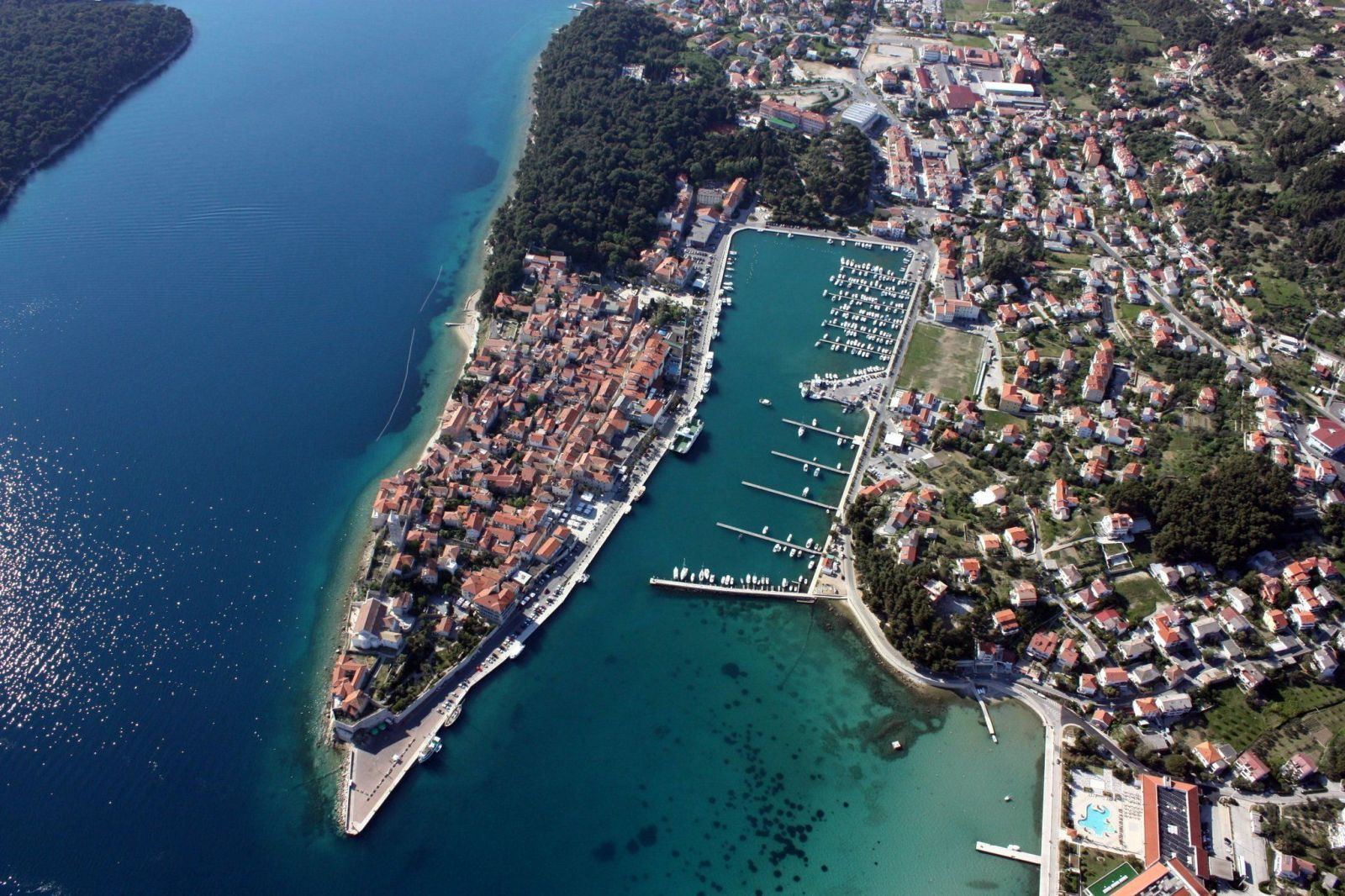
Aerial view of Rab

The island is first heard of under the Illyrians in 360 BC. It was part of Liburnia and then part of the Roman Empire. The emperor Octavian Augustus built town walls and gave Rab the title of Municipium.

Saint Marinus, the founder of the microstate of San Marino, originated on Rab, whence he fled during the religious persecutions of the Emperor Diocletian (this ancient bond is commemorated in the present twin-city agreement between Rab and San Marino).

The earliest bishop of Arba whose name is preserved in an extant document is Titianus, a participant in a council held in 532 Salona, the metropolitan see of which Arba was a suffragan. Among the signatories of the Second Council of Nicea was a bishop of Rab, namely Ursus. (“Ursus episcopus Avaritianensium ecclesiae” Ursus of Rab) On 17 October 1154, Arba was attached instead to the archdiocese of Zadar. By the papal bull Locum Beati Petri of 30 June 1828, the history of the diocese as a residential see came to an end and its territory was united with that of Krk. No longer a residential bishopric, Arba is today listed by the Catholic Church as a titular see.

During the Middle Ages, Rab was one of the Dalmatian city-states and remained part of the Byzantine Empire, with various degrees of autonomy. For a short time, it formed a part of the medieval Kingdom of Croatia. In 1000 the island, together with the many other islands and cities of Dalmatia, submitted to the Republic of Venice. In 1358 the island came under the rule of King Louis the Great, the Angevin ruler of Hungary.

During the Renaissance it was ruled by Venice from 1409 until the end of the 18th century followed by a brief interlude under Napoleon. It was eventually annexed by the Habsburgs in 1815 and remained under Austrian rule till 1918.

Since a majority of its residents were Italian speakers, the locals sought to be annexed to the Kingdom of Italy, but Italy eventually decided to cede the island to Yugoslavia in 1921, and many of its Italian-speaking residents subsequently left for Istria and the rest of Italy.

During World War II, the forces of Fascist Italy established the Rab concentration camp on the island. A memorial complex built in 1953 commemorates the site of the former camp, located in the village of Kampor.

After the Second World War, the island was part of the Socialist Federal Republic of Yugoslavia until the Croatian independence referendum in 1991.

The island of Rab is rich in cultural heritage and cultural-historical monuments that make it a popular vacation destination. Rab is also known as a pioneer of naturism after the visit of King Edward VIII and Wallis Simpson.

The island is nowadays very popular with tourists and families for its beautiful nature, beaches, heritage and many events, particularly the Rab arbalest tournament and the Rab Medieval festival called Rapska Fjera.

On 16 September 2017, after 183 millimetres (7.2 in) of rain fell by 6:00, all the lowlands of Rab were flooded.

== Twin cities ==
- Sežana, Slovenia
- Königsbrunn, Germany
- San Marino, San Marino

== Important Bird Area ==
The island forms part of the Kvarner Islands Important Bird Area (IBA), designated as such by BirdLife International because it supports significant numbers of many bird species, including breeding populations of several birds of prey.
