= Isla Air Express =

Spanish start-up regional airline

IATA	ICAO	Call sign
—	MCA	COASTAL CLIPPER
- Founded: 2019
- Fleet size: 1
- Destinations: 6 (proposed)
- Headquarters: Palma De Mallorca, Spain
- Key people: Sergio Núñez-Cacho Solans (CEO)
- Website: www.islaair.com

Isla Air Express is a start-up regional airline based in Palma de Mallorca, Spain. The airline intends to set up a network of inter-island routes within the Balearic Islands using DHC-6 Twin Otter floatplanes operated under the AOC of Mediterranean Coastal Airlines.

== History ==
The airline was established in 2019. One of the founders is Klaus Dieter Martin, who was previously the CEO of European Coastal Airlines. The airline started operating test flights between the islands in November 2024, after obtaining permits from the Balearic Port Authority and the Spanish Aviation Safety and Security Agency. The seaplanes will be operated by Maltese sister airline Mediterranean Coastal Airlines.

== Destinations ==
Initially, the airline is set to operate flights between the port areas of Palma de Mallorca and Ibiza, with flights to Formentera and Mahón (Menorca) to be added in a later stage. Flights to the Spanish mainland (Valencia and Alicante) are also planned.

== Fleet ==
=== Current fleet ===
As of July 2026, Isla Air Express operates the following aircraft:

Isla Air Express fleet
Aircraft	In service	Orders	Passengers
DHC-6-300 Twin Otter	1	1	—

=== Fleet development ===
The Isla Air Express fleet is set to consist of de Havilland Canada DHC-6-300 Twin Otter float planes. The first, registered as 9H-PALMA, was delivered in June 2023. A second Twin Otter, registered as 9H-IBIZA is set to join the fleet in late 2024.
