= Rapska fjera =

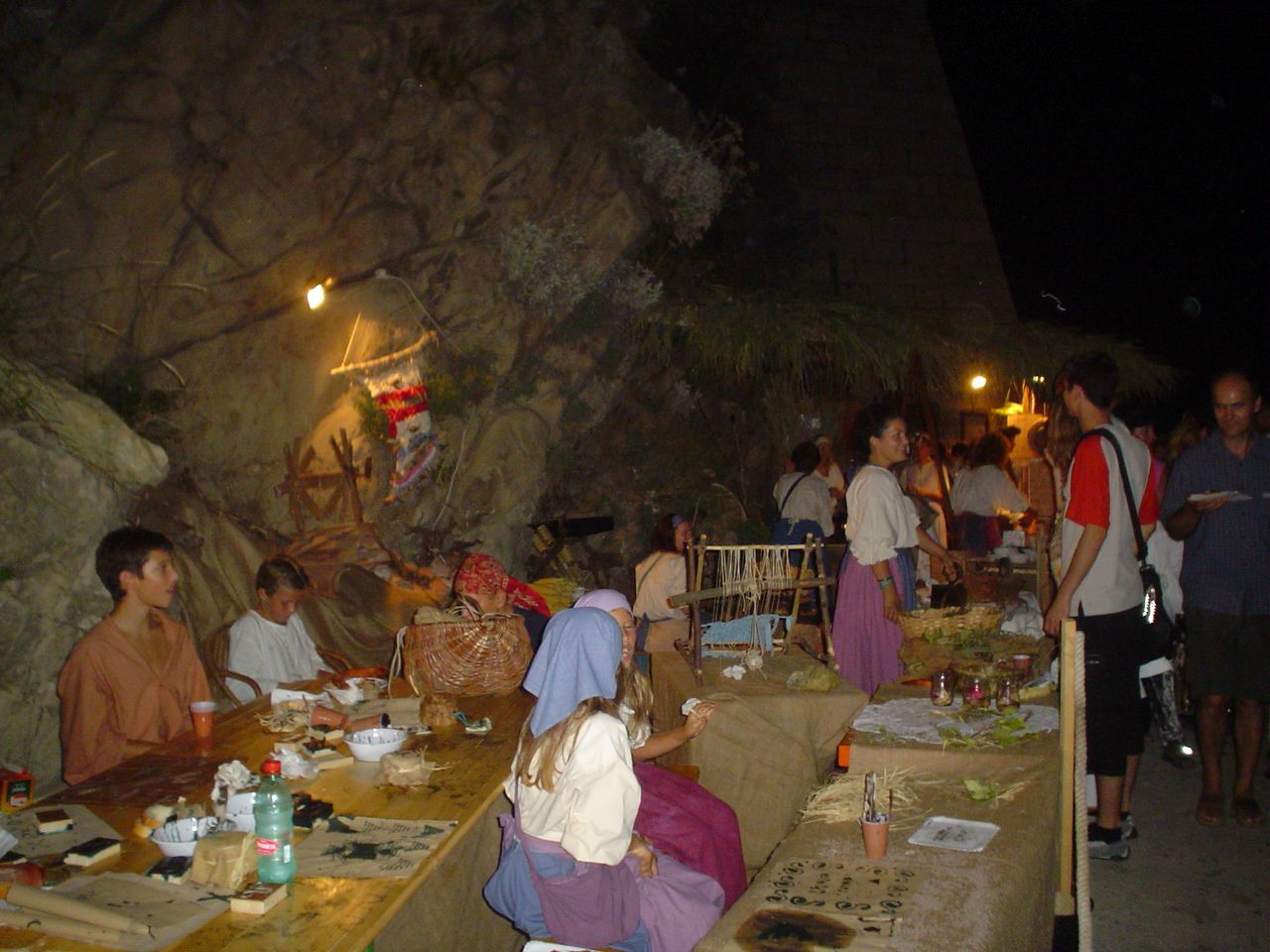

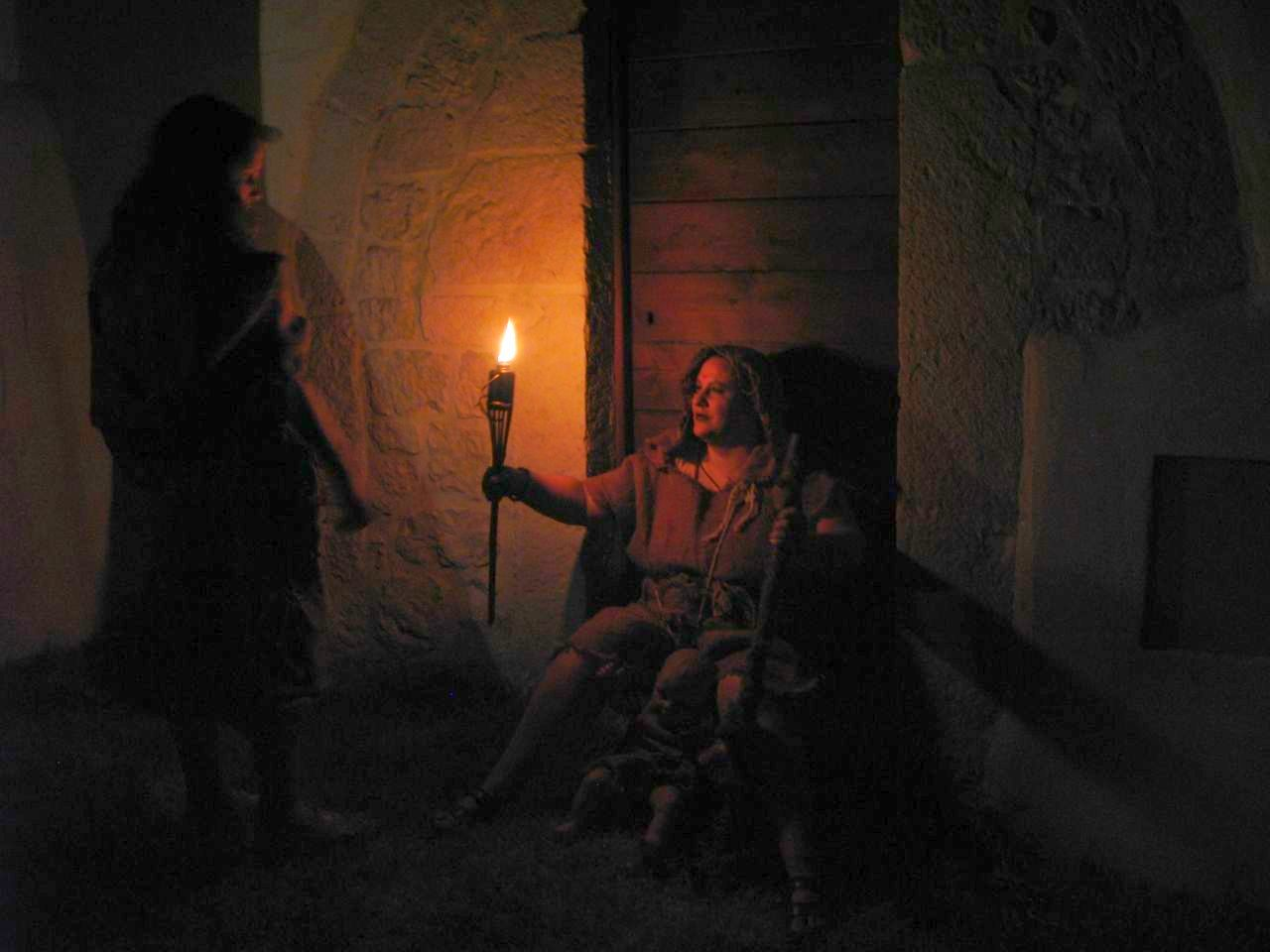
Rapska Fjera 2008 - lepers

Rapska fjera [rapska fjɛra] is a historical reenactment and festival on the island of Rab in Croatia, in which the people of the island present their history for tourists. The residents of the island try to present the life of their ancestors in three days of costumed performances and demonstrations.

This event is based on historical reenactment and celebrations lasting for three days around the feast days of St. Christopher (patron saint) in the town of Rab. The event includes a medieval festival of crafts and customs and a crossbow tournament.

It is held on the streets of the oldest part of Rab. There are displays of traditional crafts such as pottery, painting, fishing, coinage, stitching, basket weaving, carpentry, and sculpting, as well as displays by florists, honey makers, herbalists, and from crossbowmen who explain the technique and the history of the crossbow. In the gallery PIK, there is a recreation of a traditional medieval household, including women rippling wool, weaving, grain grinding, bread making and traditional song.

The celebrations were first held in 1364 in honor of King Louis the Great who defended Rab from Venice. At that time they lasted for a whole week around the feast days of St. James, St. Anne, and St. Christopher, culminating with the knights' crossbow tournament. Fjera is now held on those three days (25, 26 & 27 July). It culminates with a costumed parade, the crossbow tournament on St. Christopher's square, and cannon fireworks.

Participants:

- various Rab groups
- Castell Montegiardino group
- San Marino balestrieri
- town Königsbrunn, Germany
- Šibenik hawkers
