= Port of Split =

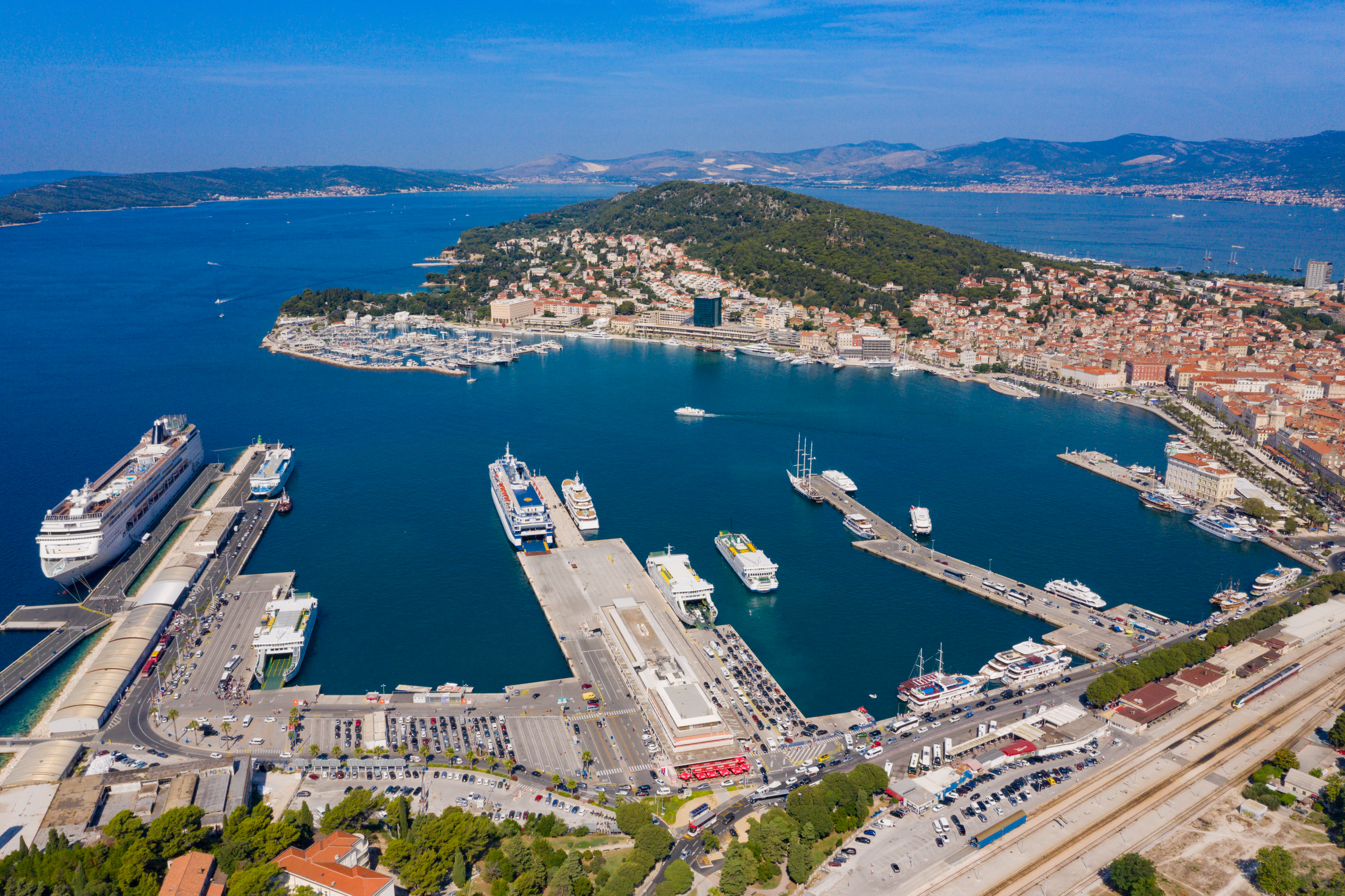
- The City Port in Split
- Interactive map of Port of Split
- Location within Croatia

Location
- Country: Croatia
- Location: Split
- Coordinates: 43.505079°N 16.442156°E
- UN/LOCODE: HRSPU

Details
- Operated by: Split Port Authority; Luka d.d. Split; Trajektna Luka Split d.d.
- Director of the Port Authority: Joško Berket Bakota
- Luka d.d. Split chairman: Dragan Žanetić
- Trajektna Luka Split d.d. chairman: Toni Medvidović

Statistics
- Vessel arrivals: 23,468 (2019)
- Annual cargo tonnage: ▲2,040,547 tonnes (2020)
- Annual container volume: ▲6,822 TEUs (2019)
- Passenger traffic: ▲5,8 million (2024)
- Website www.portsplit.hr

The Port of Split (Croatian: Luka Split) is a port in the central Dalmatian city of Split, Croatia. The port was originally a trading post originally established by Greek settlers from the island of Vis and subsequently taken over by the Romans. The port thrived through the Middle Ages, but it suffered a decline in the late 18th and early 19th centuries when the Port of Rijeka took over as the primary trading and shipping outlet of the region. The decline was also attributed to the decline of the Ottoman Empire, a traditional market for the Port of Split, and the growing domination of Austrian Empire.

As of 2017, the port ranks as the largest passenger port in Croatia, the largest passenger port in the Adriatic, and the 11th largest port in the Mediterranean, with annual passenger volume of approximately 5 million. By 2010, the Port of Split recorded 18,000 ship arrivals each year. The port is managed by the Port of Split Authority (PSA). In the late 2000s, the PSA and the port operators, Trajektna Luka Split d.d. and Luka d.d. Split, started to implement an investment plan aimed at increasing both passenger and cargo traffic volume, scheduled to be completed by 2015, which would allow the port to handle up to 7 million passengers per year.

== Business operations ==
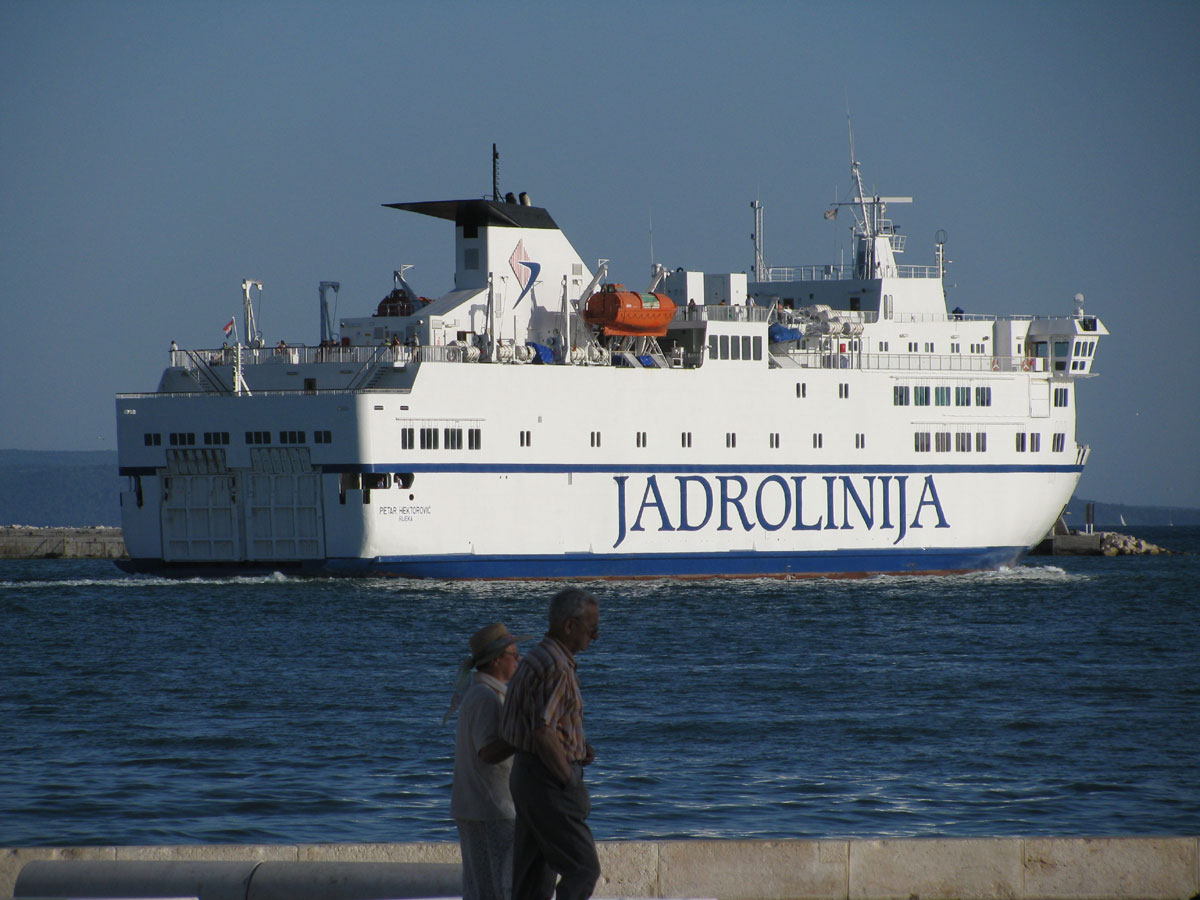
The ferry Petar Hektorović departing the Port of Split

The Port of Split is the largest passenger port in Croatia and the third largest passenger seaport in the Mediterranean. The port is administered by the Port of Split Authority, and the primary concessionaires Trajektna Luka Split and Luka d.d. Split, as well as 11 secondary concessionaires awarded concessions to use the port facilities or provide services in the port. The primary concessionaires are operating the City Port Split and Vranjic-Solin basin area, respectively, with the secondary concessionaires active in Vranjic-Solin area of the port and the terminals based in Kaštela. The latter are Dalmacijacement, PROplin, Brodomerkur, Trast, Tehnospoj, Dujmovača, Žitni Terminal, INA, Profectus, Eko Kaštelanski Zaljev and OMV companies. Passenger and vehicle transit is handled by Jadrolinija, Krilo Shipping Company, Krilo - Kapetan Luka and Split Express; however in 2009 Jadrolinija share of the passenger traffic volume reached 85%. In 2009, total passenger traffic volume reached 3,995,846 passengers, representing a 3.3% drop compared to the previous year. The port serves eight island ferry lines, and nine additional passenger shipping lines connecting nearby islands. There are such transport links to the islands of Brač and Hvar—carrying up to 2,000 and 1,000 vehicles per day during tourist seasons—as well as to islands of Vis, Lastovo, Korčula, Šolta, Drvenik Veliki, Drvenik Mali providing regular transport links for a large area. In 2009, the ferry lines carried annual average daily traffic of 1,698 vehicles. During the summer peak season, the volume increases to a total of 3,812 vehicles on average.

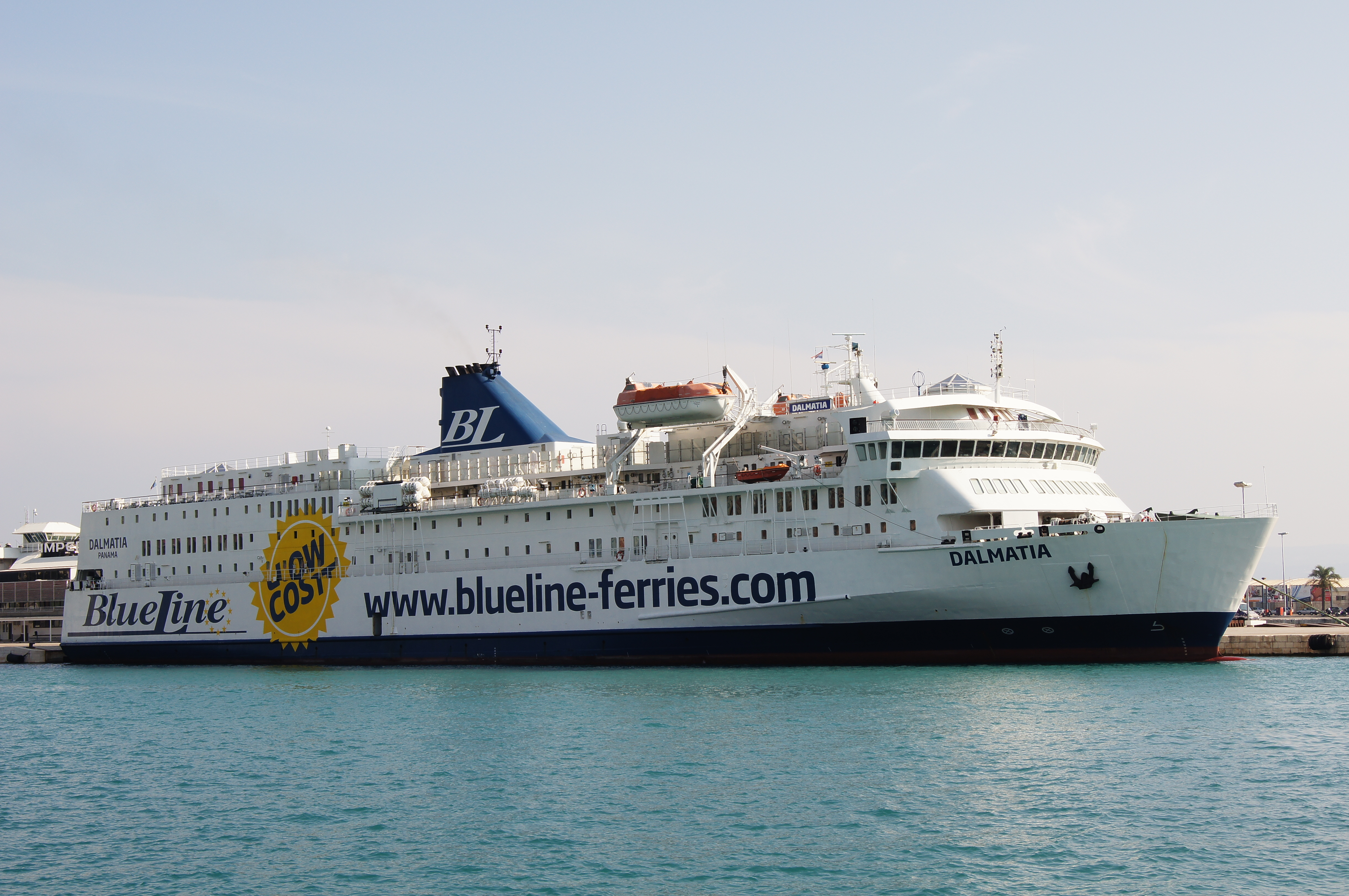
MV Dalmatia in the port of Split

In 2008, the Port of Split recorded a total of 16,527 ship arrivals, and handled 2.7 million tonnes of cargo. In 2008, Luka d.d. Split, the primary cargo concessionaire company of the Port of Split, recorded substantial growth of transshipment volume. In the first nine months of the year, the company handled 276,000 tonnes of cargo, representing a growth rate of 20% achieved by that company. The cargo volume projected for the entire year was estimated at 345,000 tonnes, including 6,170 TEUs. The growth was permitted by investments made in late 2007, and the increased volume of operation brought about profit of approximately 2.4 million kuna (325,000 euro) in the first nine months of 2008. Overall port operations continue to grow, as 18,000 arrivals were recorded by 2010. Director of the Split Port Authority is Joško Berket Bakota.

== Transport facilities ==
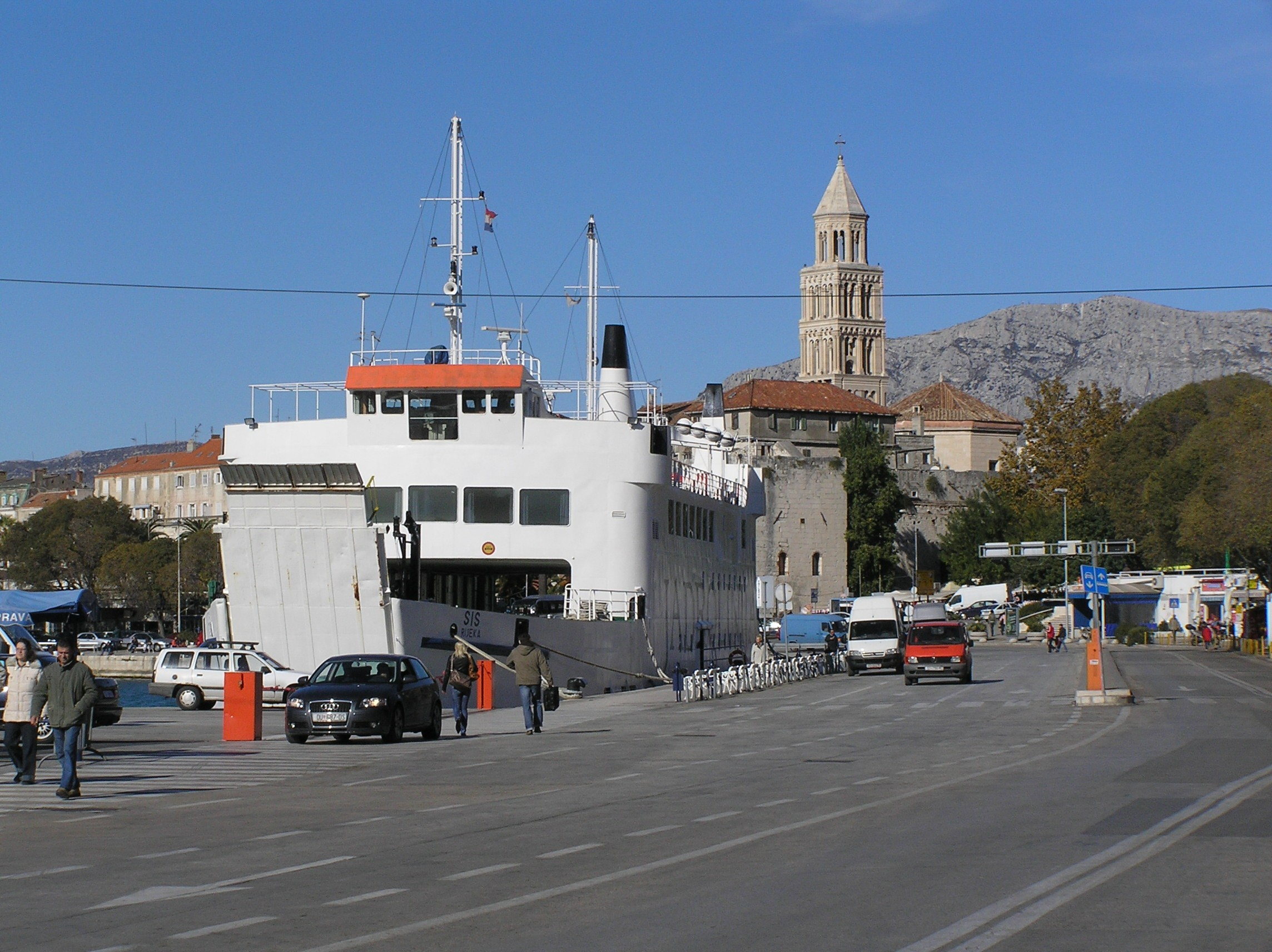
Ferry dock in the Port of Split

The Port of Split is located on the Adriatic Sea coast in a bay protected by the Split peninsula and a string of islands. Its facilities include terminals and other structures in Split, Solin and Kaštela, all located on approximately 15 kilometers (9.3 miles) of coast. The port is connected by the International E-road network routes E65 and E71 carried by the Croatian A1 motorway and the D1 state road. The port is also connected with Zagreb by an un-electrified single-track railway, which runs through Knin and Karlovac.

The port comprises several terminals:

- The Port of Split - handles yachts, fishing vessels, passenger ships, navigation safety craft, sailing ships, tugboats, seaplanes and ferries; contains a passenger terminal and a rail link, 28 berths and accommodates vessels up to 250 meters (820 feet) long with draught up to 7.9 meters (26 feet)
- Resnik-Divulje passenger terminal - designed to facilitate transfer of ship passengers to the Split Airport, located just 950 metres (3,120 feet) away; The terminal consists of a single berth accommodating craft up to 40 meters (130 feet) long with draught up to 4.5 meters (15 feet)
- Vranjic-Solin basin - used as a container cargo terminal, comprising 5 berths, a roll-on/roll-off ramp, 8 storage warehouses, including refrigerated storage and open storage area; the terminal accommodates ships up to 198 meters (650 feet) long with draught up to 10.2 meters (33 feet); The facility is located in Vranjic area north of the city of Split, connected by railway and its own truck terminal. The terminal comprises a Free Zone, allowing tax breaks for transshipment of cargo and processing of goods. The terminal encompasses a 19.8-hectare (49-acre) area.
- Kaštela basin A - reserved for mooring of ships under instructions by the port authority
- Kaštela basin B - cargo terminal used by the secondary concessionaires (other than Luka d.d. Split), generally for their own transport needs, accommodating ships with draught up to 8.2 meters (27 feet)
- Kaštela basin C - mooring for laid-up vessels, pest control, fishing boats etc.; the terminal accommodates craft with draught up to 11.6 meters (38 feet)

== Airlines and destinations ==
As of 13 August 2016, there are currently no scheduled services as the only airline here, European Coastal Airlines, has suspended operations.

== History ==
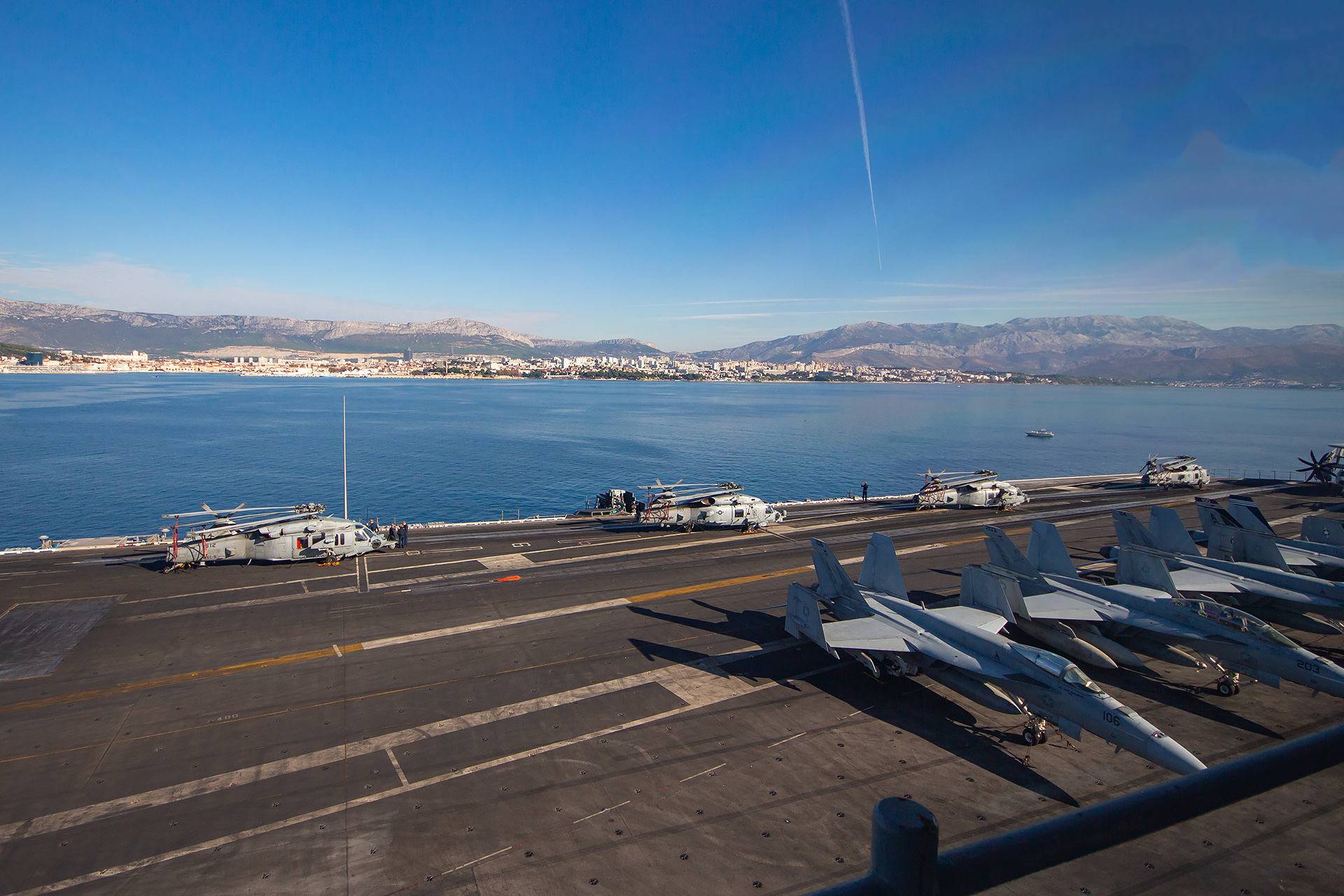
Port of Split seen from the flightdeck of the USS George H.W. Bush

The first trading post at the site of the Port of Split was Aspalathos, established by Greek settlers from the island of Vis in the 4th century BC. Position of the trading post was selected because of its location in a natural harbor and its proximity to numerous Adriatic Sea islands and extensive hinterland populated by Illyrians, most notably in Salona. The area subsequently became a part of the Roman Empire, and after its Decline of the Roman Empire, the coast was brought under rule of the Byzantine Empire, until the area was absorbed into the Kingdom of Croatia in the beginning of the 10th century. In 1102, Croatia and Kingdom of Hungary were joined in a personal union. By the 12th century, Split had developed trading routes with its hinterland and maritime trade throughout the Adriatic Sea and the Mediterranean. The Republic of Venice of gained full control of Dalmatia and the city of Split by 1428. In the 16th century, Split was the central maritime trade outlet of the Balkans, where goods were transported from the Ottoman Empire, India and Persia to the Venetian Republic and vice versa. After the fall of Venice, Split was briefly ruled by the Habsburg monarchy and Austrian Empire between 1797 and 1806, and the First French Empire until 1813 when Austrian rule was restored. In that period, trade routes shifted to other Adriatic ports, especially the Port of Rijeka, causing a downturn in the city's economy.

In the second half of the 19th century, the economy of the city of Split and its surrounding area started to recover and Split soon became hub of the central Dalmatia, connecting the hinterland and the neighboring islands. This spurred development of the city port and its transport connections, including construction of a new breakwater and the Split–Knin railway. In 1925, the railway was linked to the Rijeka–Zagreb railway via Gospić, allowing development of a modern port. Since 1957, cargo terminals of the Port of Split were relocated from the city centre to industrial zones in Solin and Kaštela areas, while passenger traffic still uses the centrally positioned harbor.

=== Future expansion ===
As of 2011, the Port of Split facilities are intended to be modernized to specialize in domestic and international passenger traffic. Consequently, St. Nicholas pier is planned to be extended and summer seasonal berths are scheduled to be added by 2015. The Resnik-Divulje passenger terminal is planned to be expanded within the framework of the second construction stage entailing two additional berths by the end of 2014. The expansions of the two passenger terminals are aimed at achieving passenger transport capacity of 7 million passengers per year. Two new berths capable of accommodating 300-metre (980 ft) long cruise ships are also planned, and is expected to cost 100 million kuna (13.3 million euro) to construct. The container terminal in Vranjic-Solin basin is also expected to be modernized and its infrastructure is planned to be upgraded. Other segments of the port are scheduled to undergo comparably minor repairs as well.

== See also ==
- Transport in Croatia
