= Mercateum =

Coordinates: 48°16′15″N 10°53′08″E

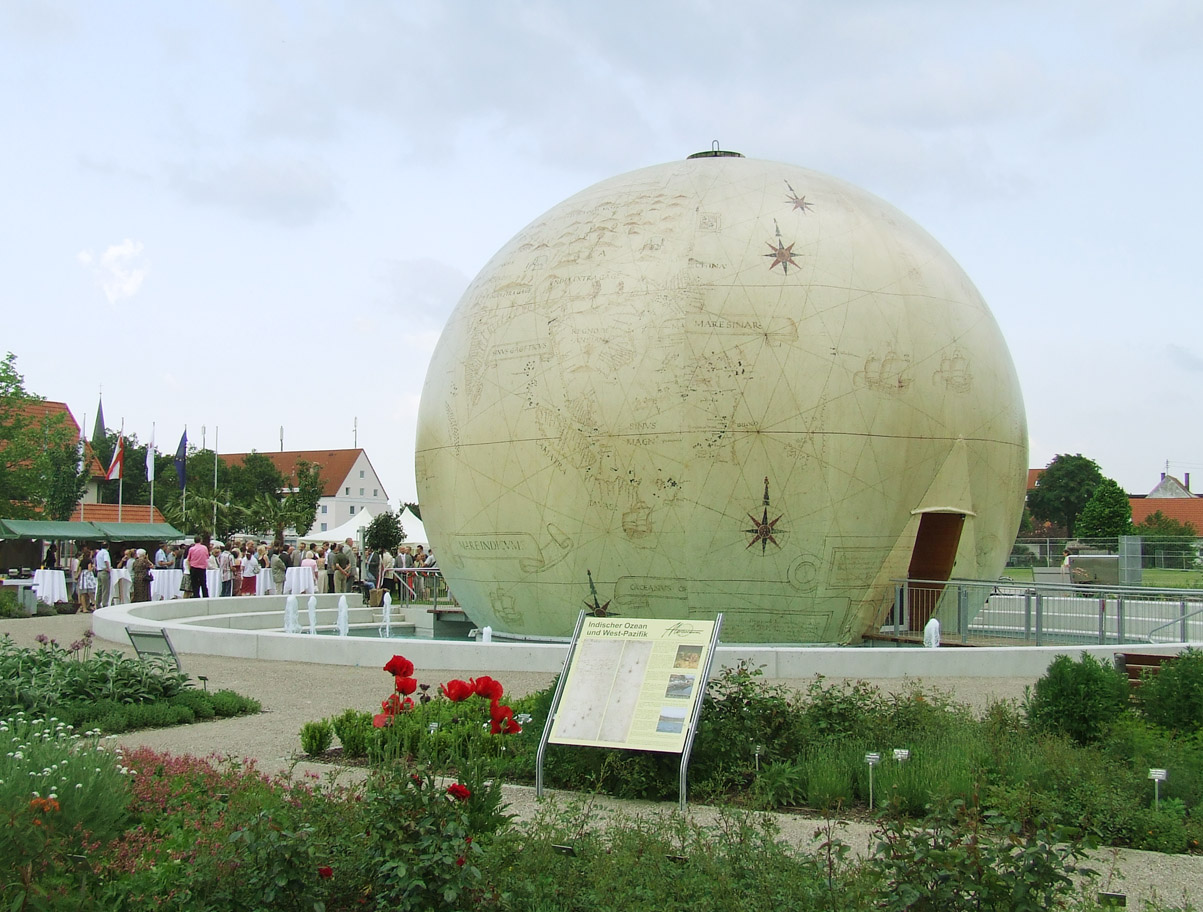

The Mercateum is the world's biggest globe based on a historical map.

It is located in the centre of Königsbrunn in the district of Augsburg, Bavaria, Germany. The globe is intended as a memorial to trade relations between the Bavarian regions of Swabia and Franconia and India. The name Mercateum is derived from the Latin word mercator, meaning 'trader', 'merchant', but also refers to the important cartographer Gerhard Mercator. Originally part of a temporary exhibition in Munich commemorating the 500th anniversary of trade relations with India (1505-2005), it was later moved to its permanent location in Königsbrunn, where it was officially opened to the public on March 30, 2008.

Inside the globe, there is a museum with an exhibition about the beginnings and the bloom of long-distance trade between India and the western world in the 16th century.

== Sources ==
- Abenteuer Welthandel dead link
