= Purger & Co. =

The logo of Purger & Co., München

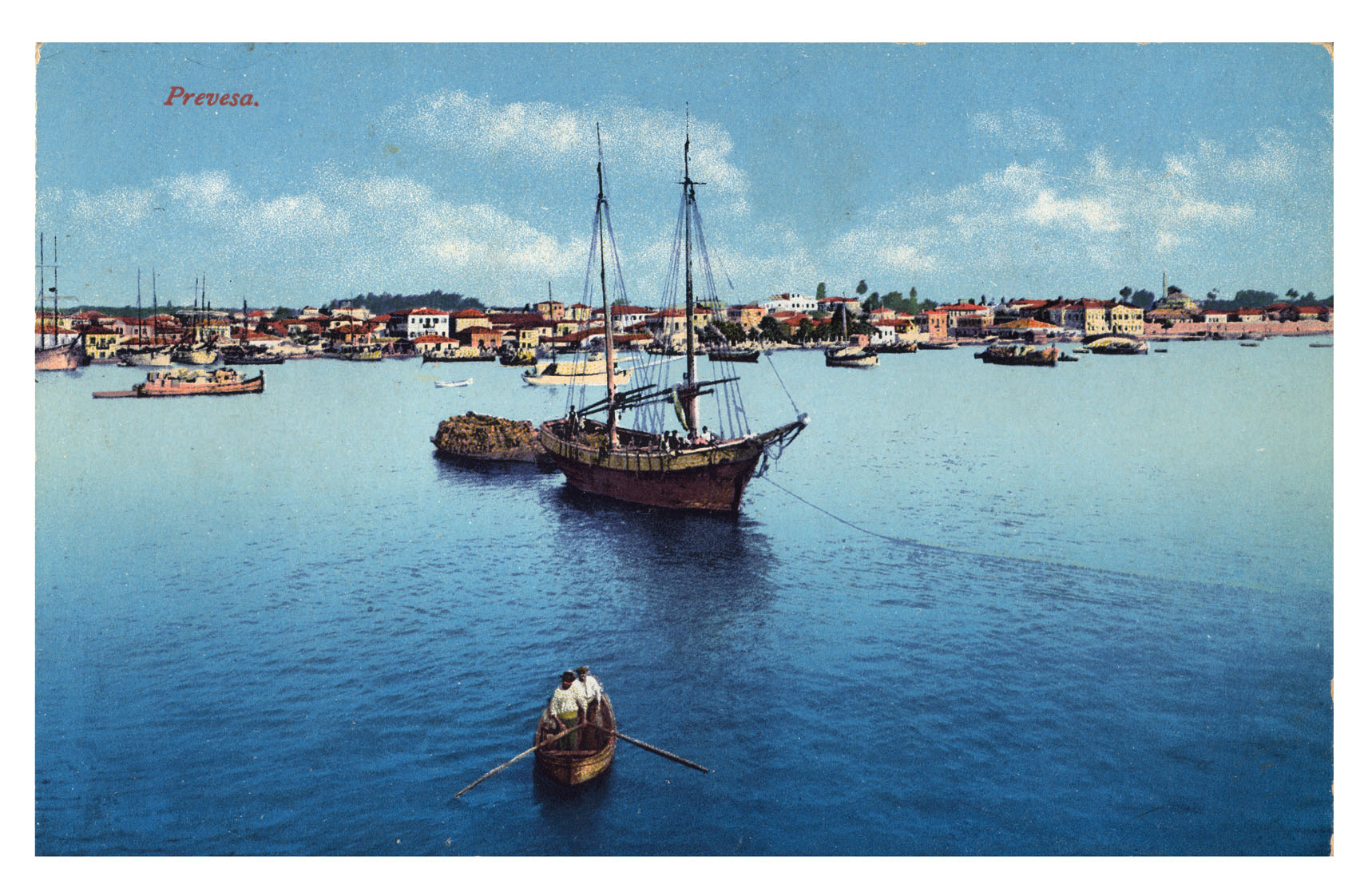
Purger & Co.'s No.13369 postcard.

Purger & Co. was a German printing house, based at Mozartstraße 13, Munich, Germany. The founder of the company was most probably named Adolf Purger. The company was known for the coloured postcards it produced mainly in the beginning of the 20th century. The early postcards of the company were printed in the last year of the 19th century. The postcards were printed in three colour chromolithography, a system called photochrome, with the indication Photochromiekarte. The company was printing not only postcards for their own account, but also for other companies, as was the case, for example, of the colour postcards of the Krikelli's series of Tinos, Greece.

Purger & Co. was active at least during the period 1899-1920 and produced postcards from all around Europe and the Mediterranean basin in photo-chromolithography.

The postcards of Purger & Co. were numbered initially at the bottom of the postcard's face, but later (possibly after 1905) on the reverse side.

Based in Munich, Purger & Co initially printed postcards with themes from the nearby regions of Bavaria, Austria and Northern Italy. Their first 1.000 numbered postcards depict images of these areas. They, afterwards, published postcards of cities in the Adriatic Sea, where the Austrian Lloyd operated several ship-lines carrying people and goods. Postcards of Morocco and Spain followed suit, as tourism started growing in these areas.

A review in 1907 mentions Purger & Co. as a specialized company for the production of cards of excellent quality and great variety and makes special note about their colours which are reproduced through such perfected process that the graduation of colour merit appreciative recognition.

Purger & Co. is mentioned as one of the influential publishers of postcards of the golden era of postcards 1901–1905, amongst the names of Raphael Tuck & Sons of London, Hauser y Menet, and Casa Laurent (both significant Spanish publishers), Künzlies (Künzli Brothers & Co. / Edition Max Künzli) of Zürich, Römmler & Jonas and Stengel & Co of Dresden, Paul Trabert of Leipzig, Brunner & Co of Como, Knackstedt & Näther of Hamburg, E. Maass of Berlin, Dr. Trenkler Co. of Leipzig, and Aspiotis of Greece. Purger & Co. is considered one of the most important producers of coloured postcards worldwide of that era.

== Gallery ==
The following images are a small sample of postcards printed in three colour lithography by Purger & Co.

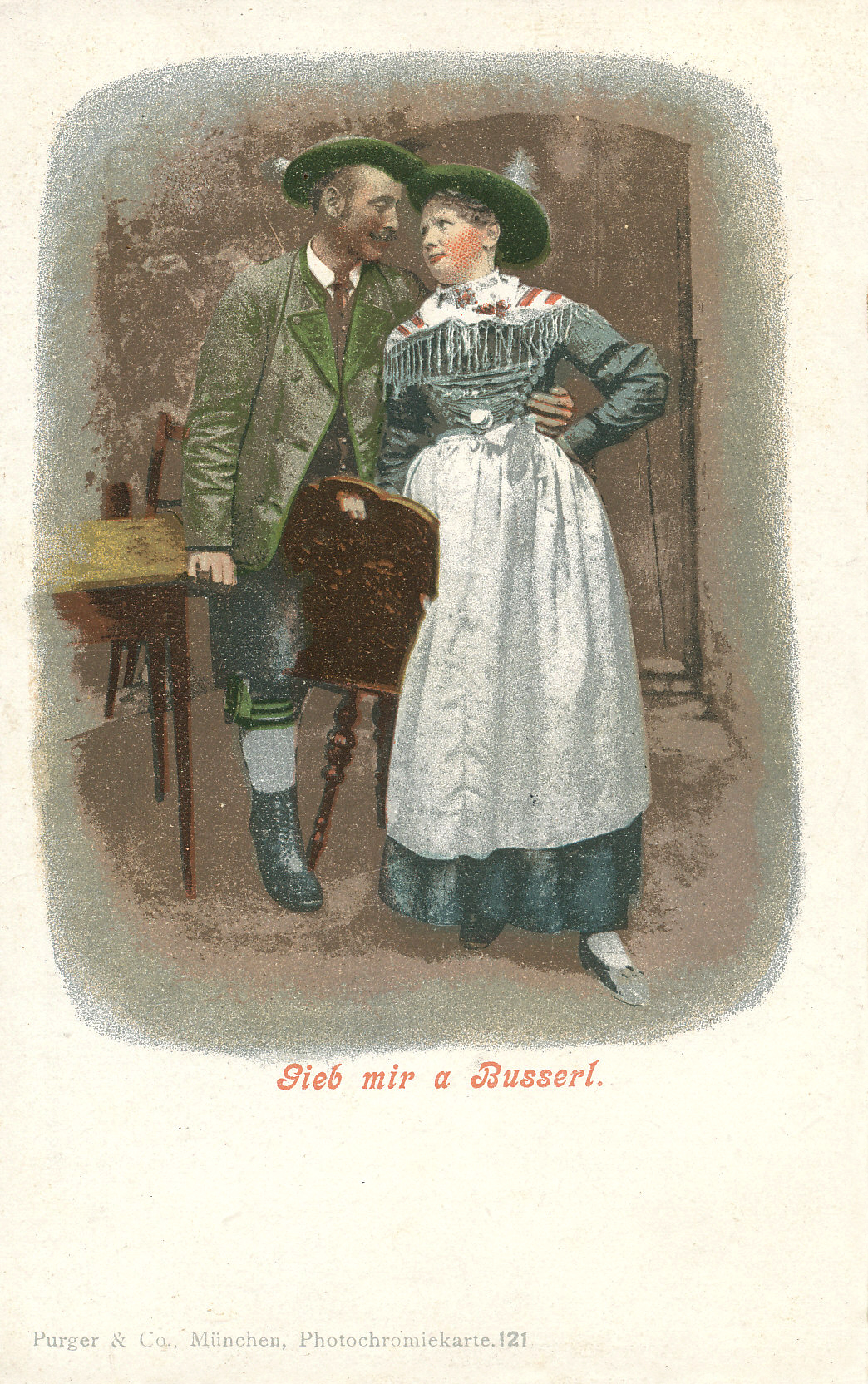
Give me a kiss (late 1890s)

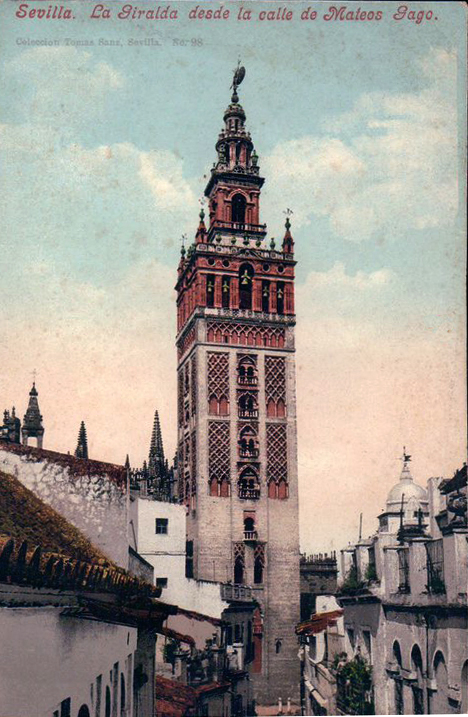
Sevilla, Spain (mid 1900s)

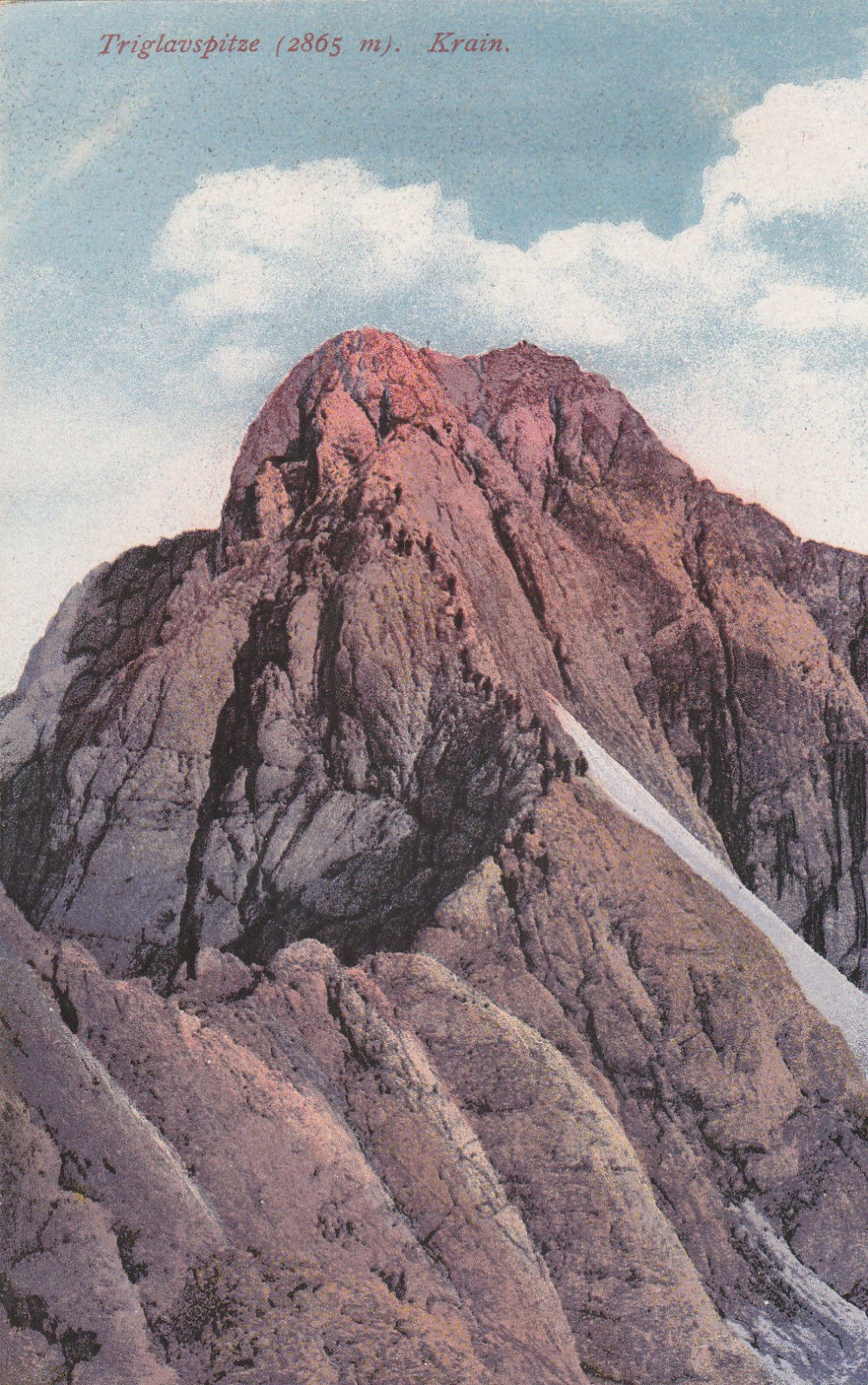
Triglav, Slovenia (1910s)

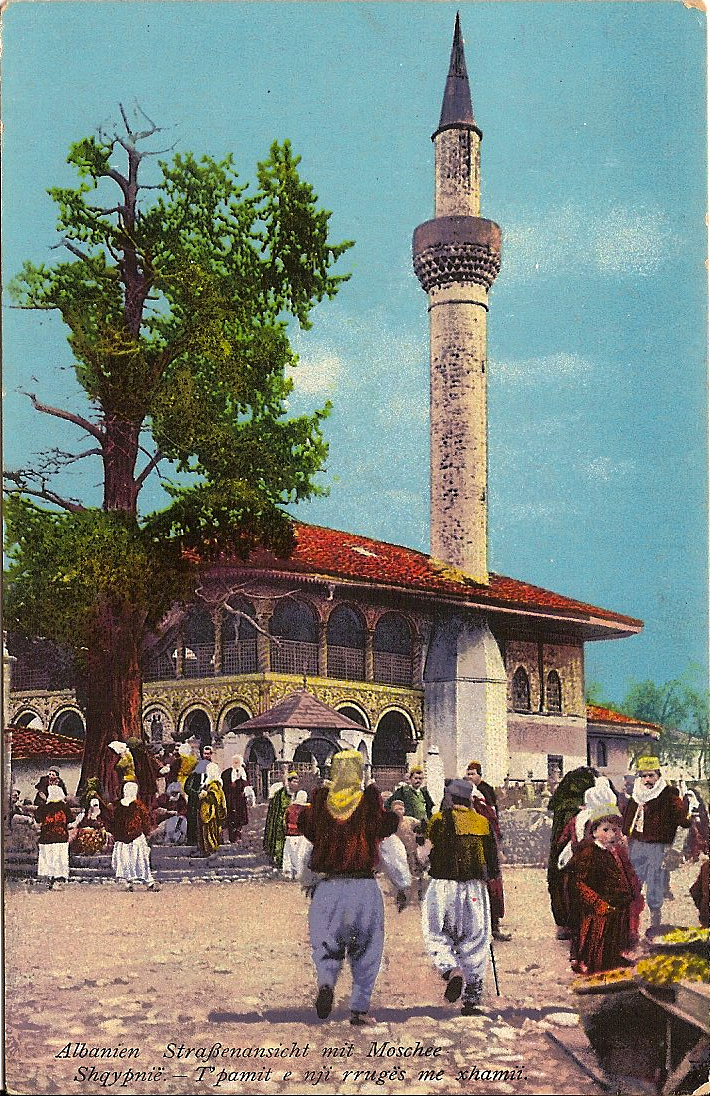
Old Mosque of Tirana (late 1900s)
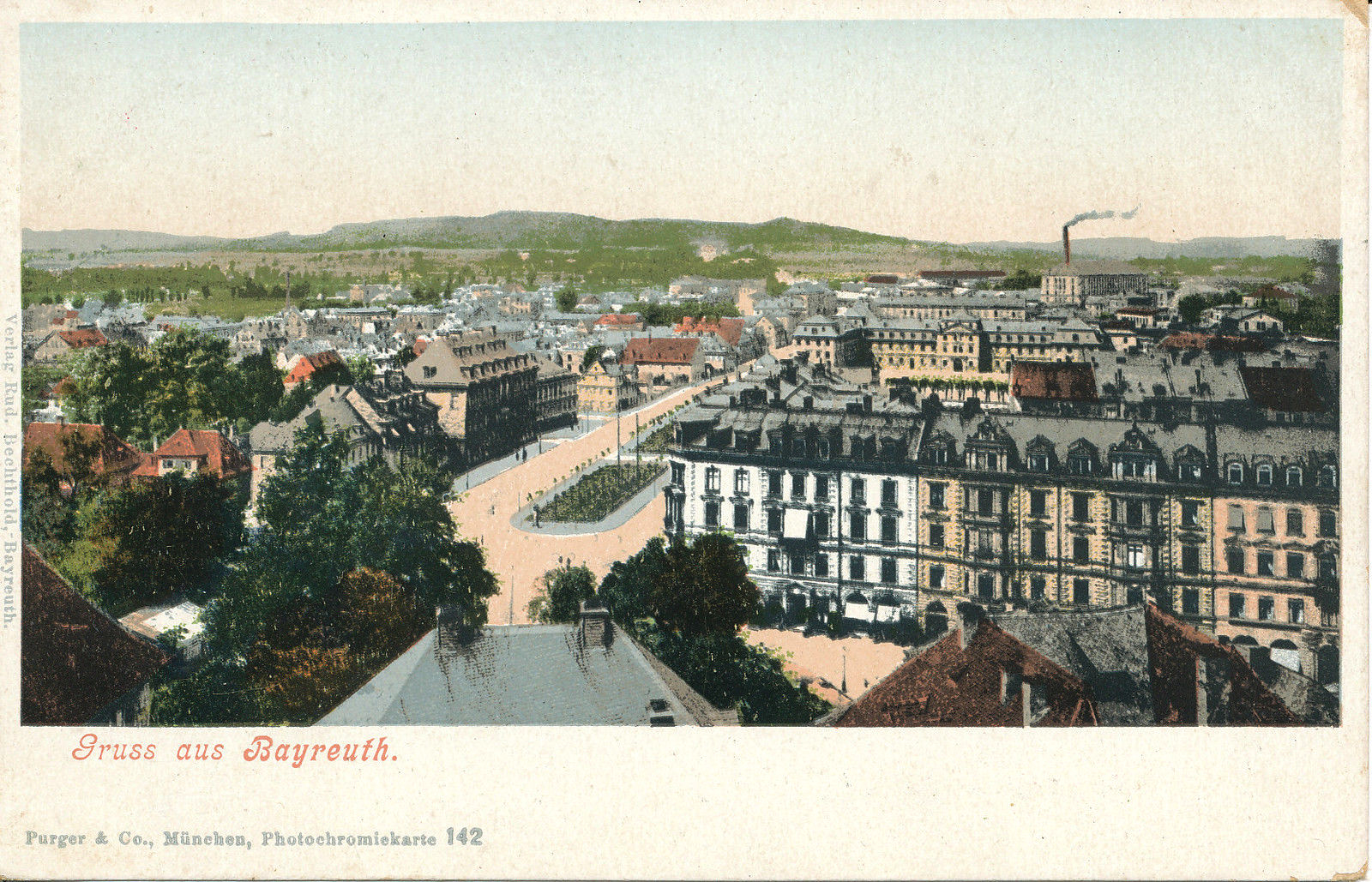
Gruss aus Bayreuth (late 1890s)

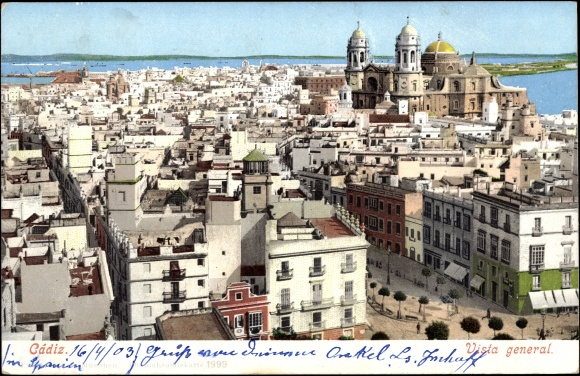
Cadiz, Spain (mid 1900s)

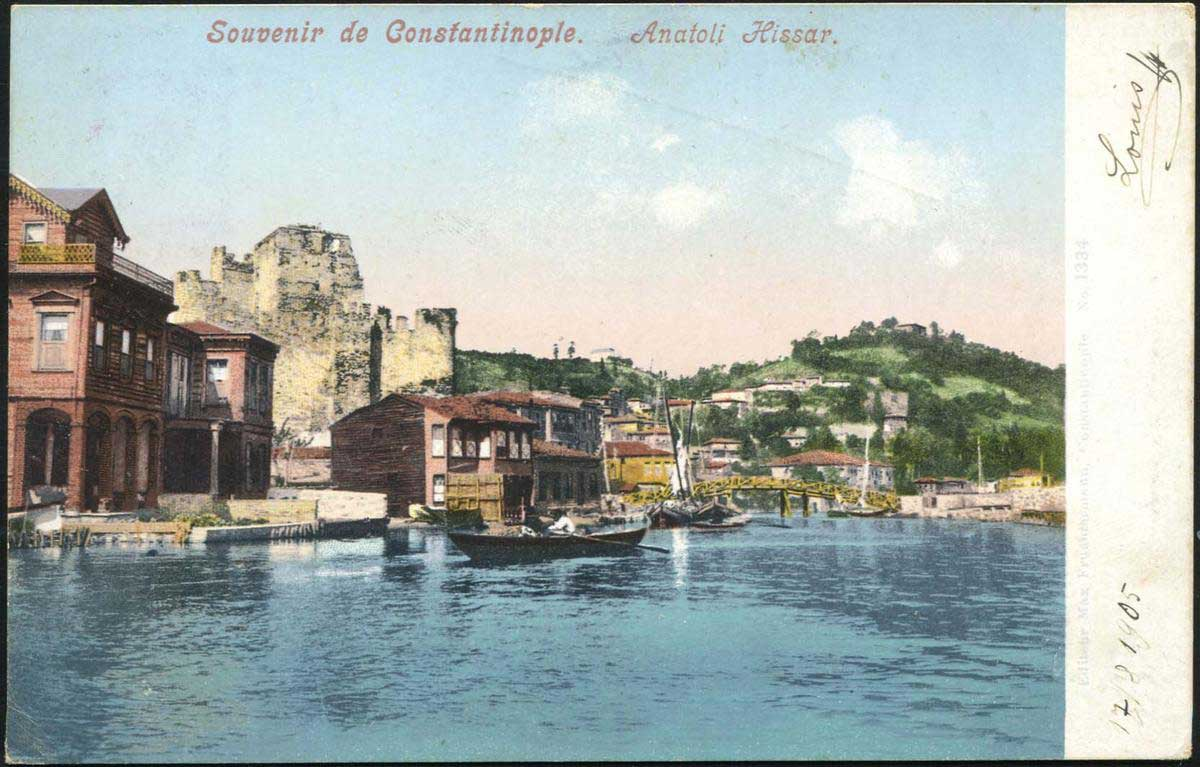
Constantinople, Turkey (mid 1900s)

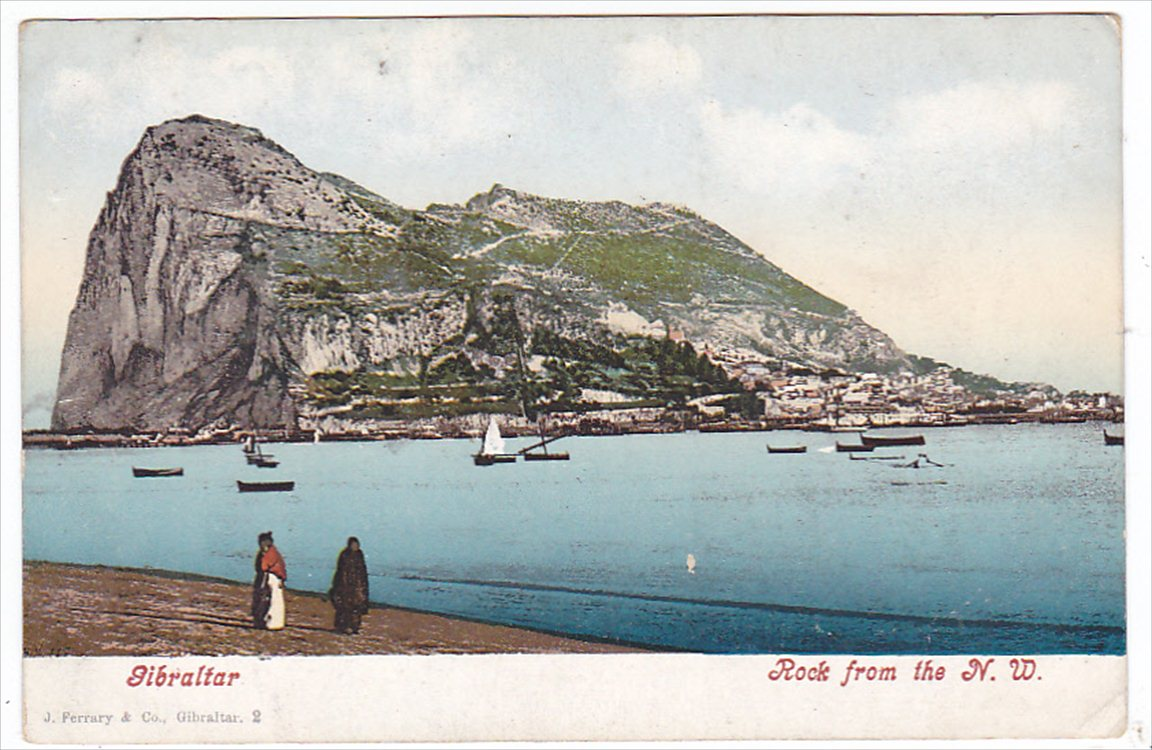
Gibraltar (mid 1900s)

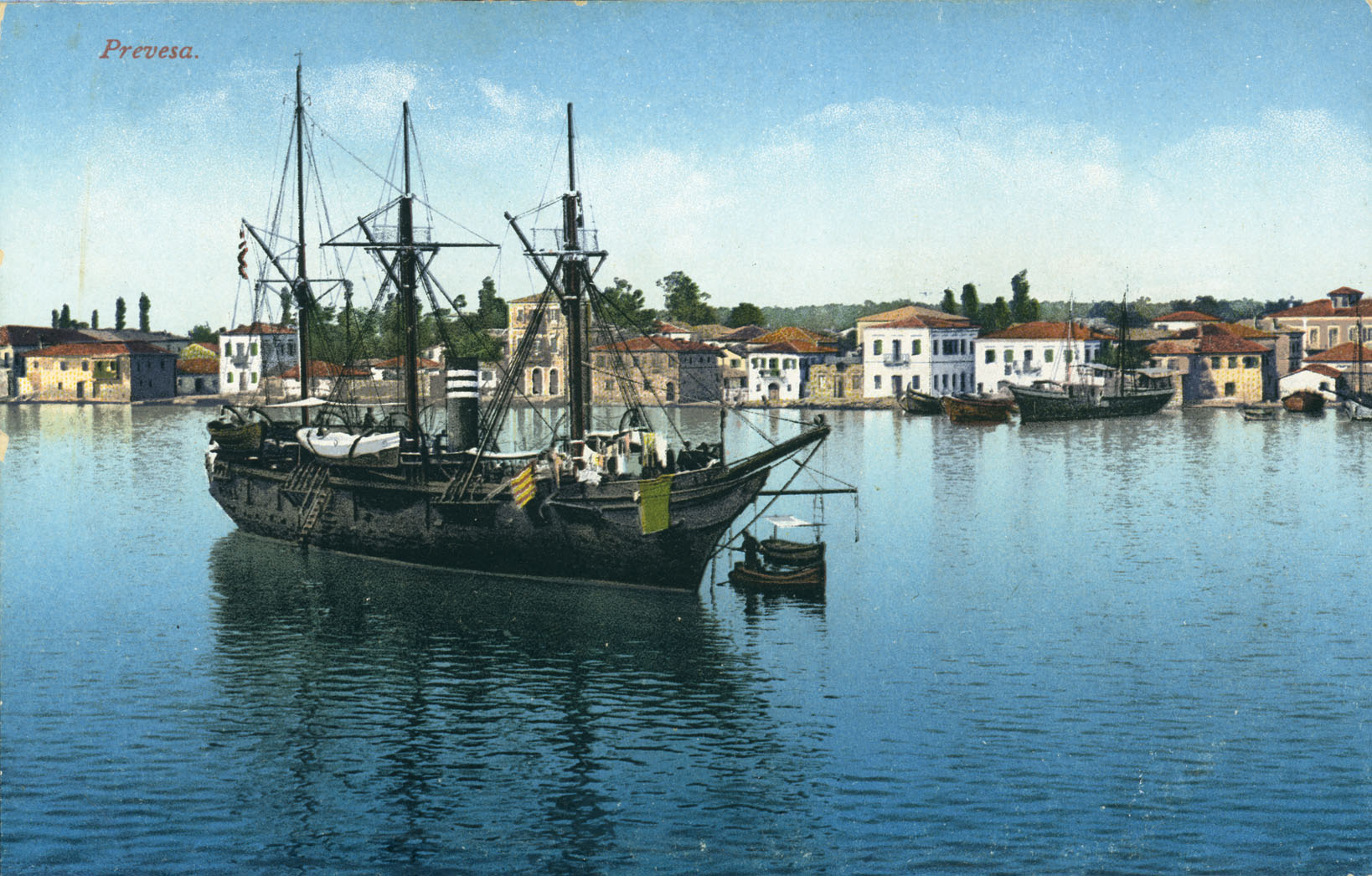
Preveza, Greece (early 1910s)

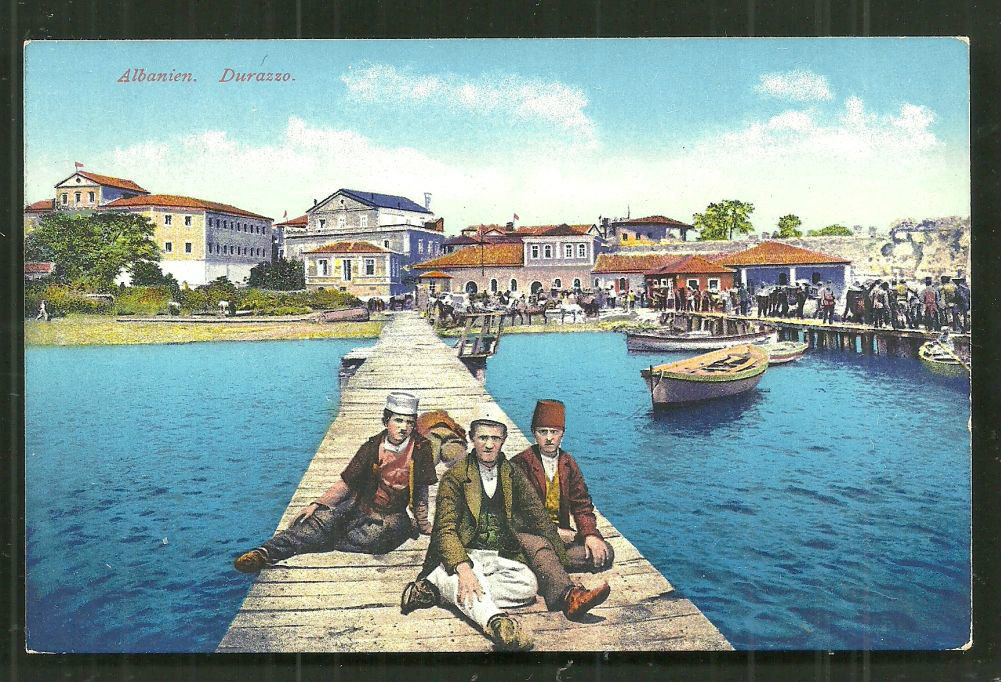
Duress, Albania (mid 1900s)

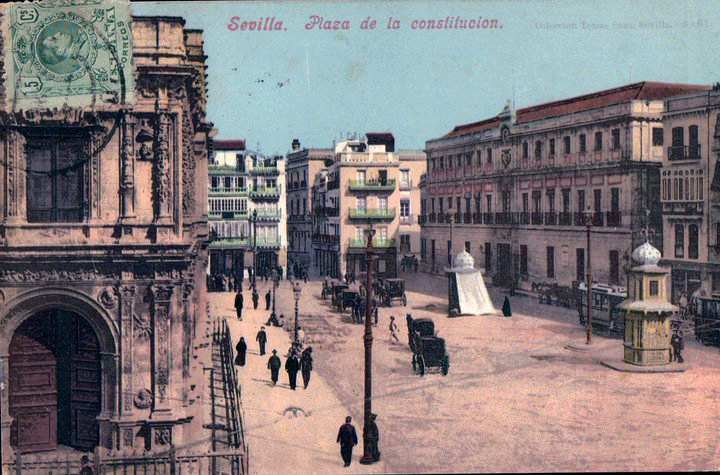
Sevilla, Spain (mid 1900s)

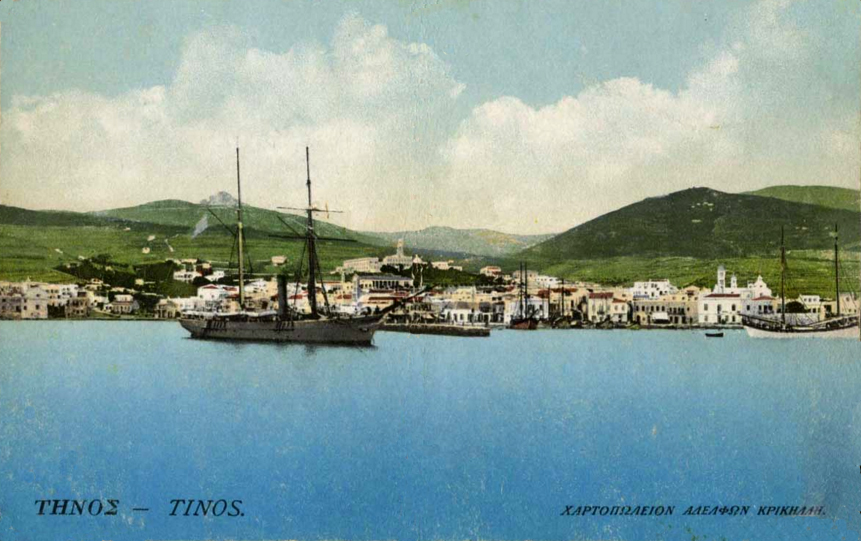
Tinos, Greece (late 1900s)

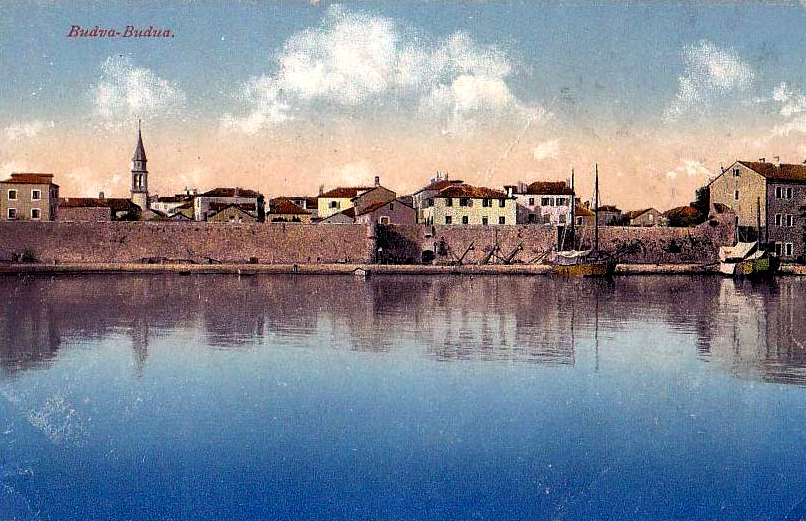
Budva, Montenegro (late 1900s)

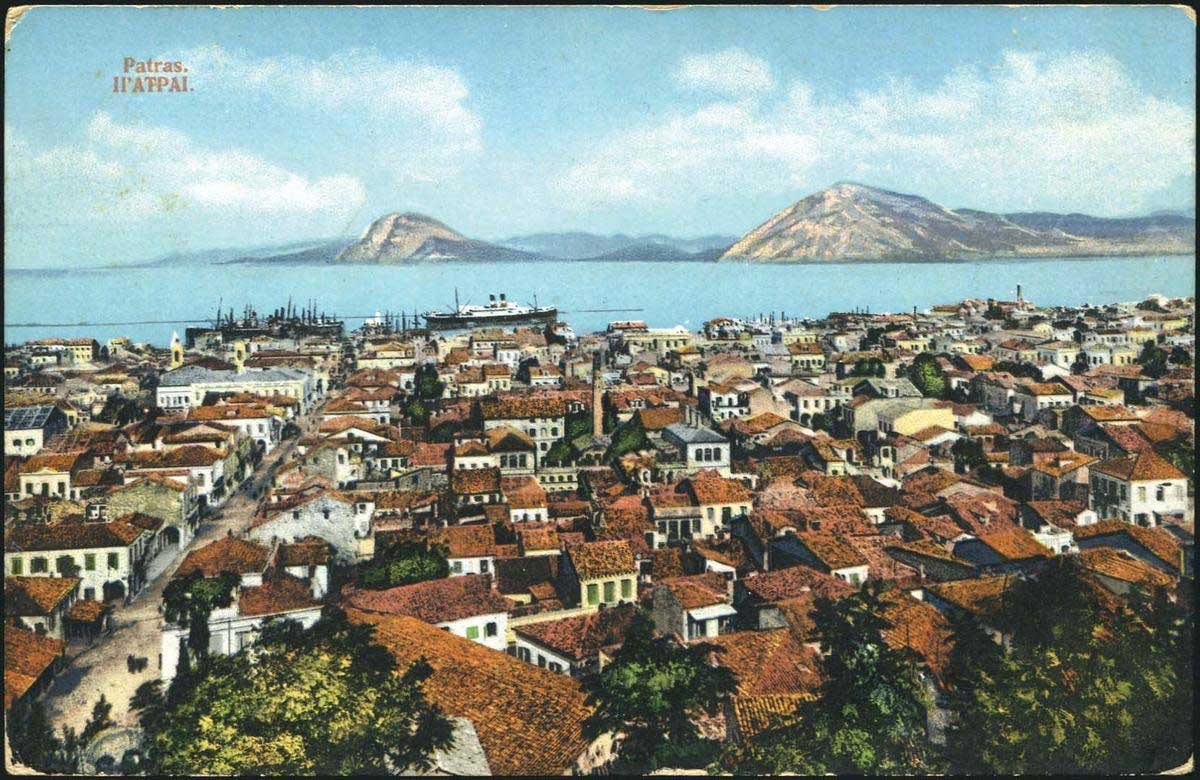
Patras, Greece (late 1900s)

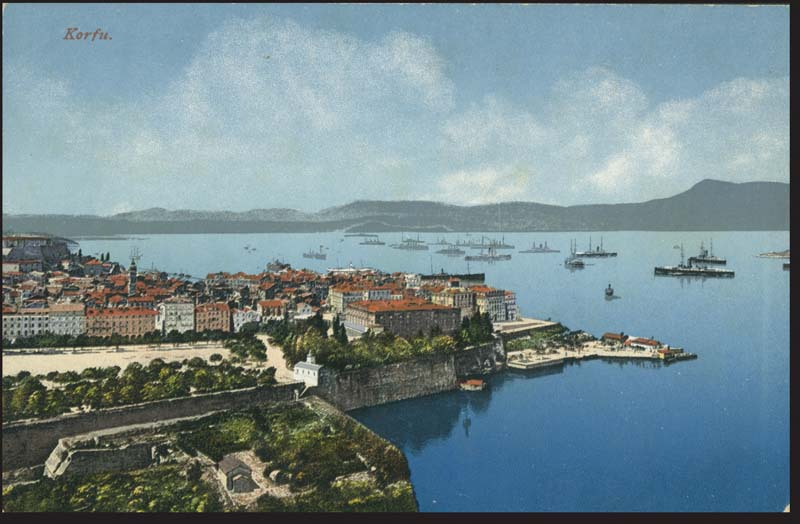
Corfu, Greece (late 1900s)

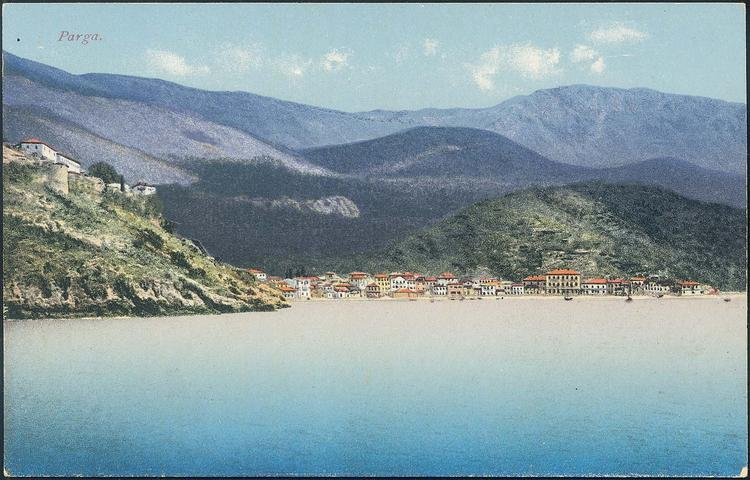
Parga, Greece (late 1900s)

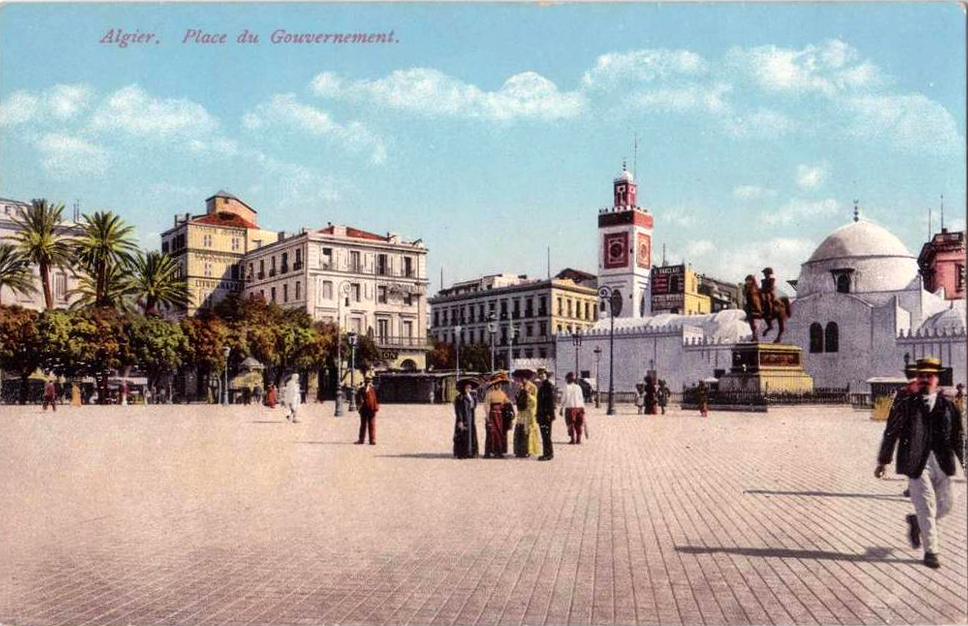
Algier, Place du Gouvernement (late 1900s)

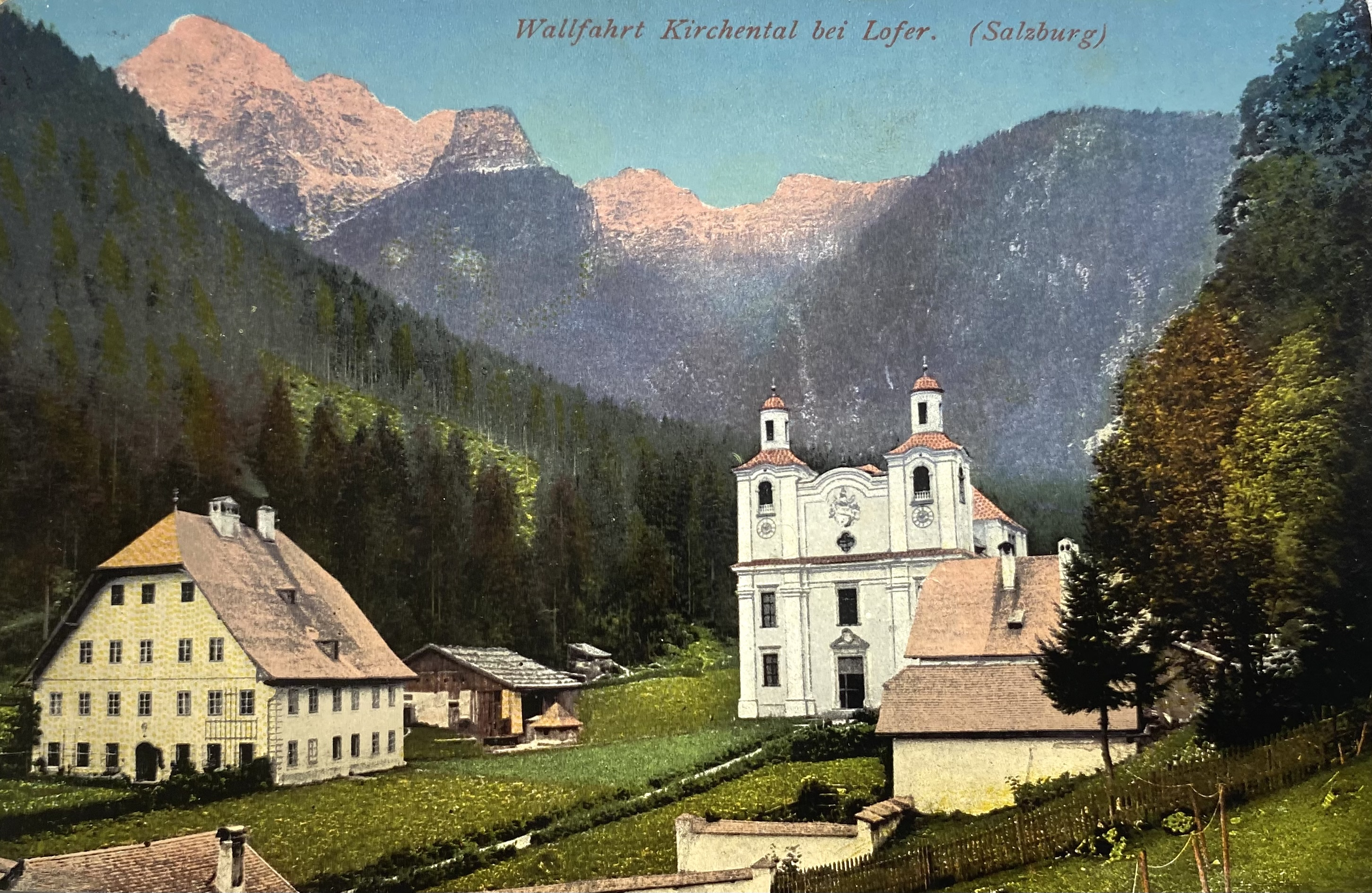
Kirchental, Austria (late 1900s)
