= Königsbrunn =

- Municipality
- Coat of arms

- Location of Königsbrunn within Augsburg district
- Interactive map of Königsbrunn
- Location within Germany Location within Bavaria
- Coordinates: 48°16′8″N 10°53′27″E
- Country: Germany
- State: Bavaria
- Admin. region: Schwaben
- District: Augsburg

Government
  - Mayor (2026–32): Franz Feigl (CSU)

Area
  - Total: 18.4 km^{2} (7.1 sq mi)
- Elevation: 516 m (1,693 ft)

Population (2025-12-31)
  - Total: 27,847
  - Density: 1,510/km^{2} (3,920/sq mi)
- Time zone: UTC+01:00 (CET)
  - Summer (DST): UTC+02:00 (CEST)
- Postal codes: 86343
- Dialling codes: 08231
- Vehicle registration: A
- Website: www.koenigsbrunn.de

Königsbrunn (German pronunciation: [køːnɪçsˈbʁʊn] or [køːnɪksˈbʁʊn]; Swabian: Kenigsbrunn) is the largest town in the district of Augsburg, in Bavaria, Germany. It is situated on the left bank of the Lech, approx. 10 km south of Augsburg. As of 2023, the population of Königsbrunn was 28,377.

== History ==
Königsbrunn is one of the youngest settlements in Bavaria. It became an independent commune in 1842 and obtained the municipal law 125 years later, in 1967. In 1688 the bishop built a custom house at the crossroad of Via Claudia, which is called the "Neuhaus" (meaning new house). It is the oldest building of the young city.

== Politics ==
The local elections of 2020 produced the following result:

- CSU: 12 seats (=)
- Alliance 90/The Greens: 5 seats (+2)
- Free Voters: 5 seats (-1)
- SPD: 3 seats (-3)
- FDP/Bürgerforum: 2 seats (+1)
- AfD: 2 seats (+2)
- Bürgerbewegung Königsbrunn e. V.: 1 seat (+1)

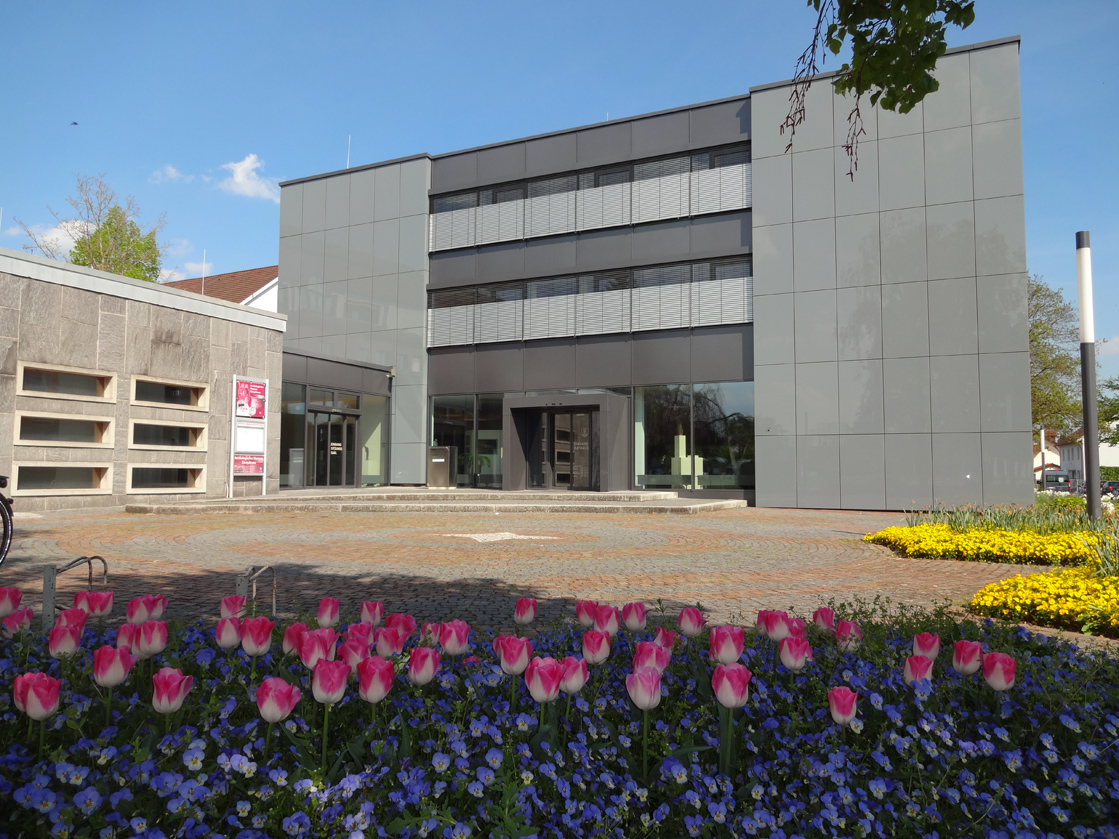
Town hall

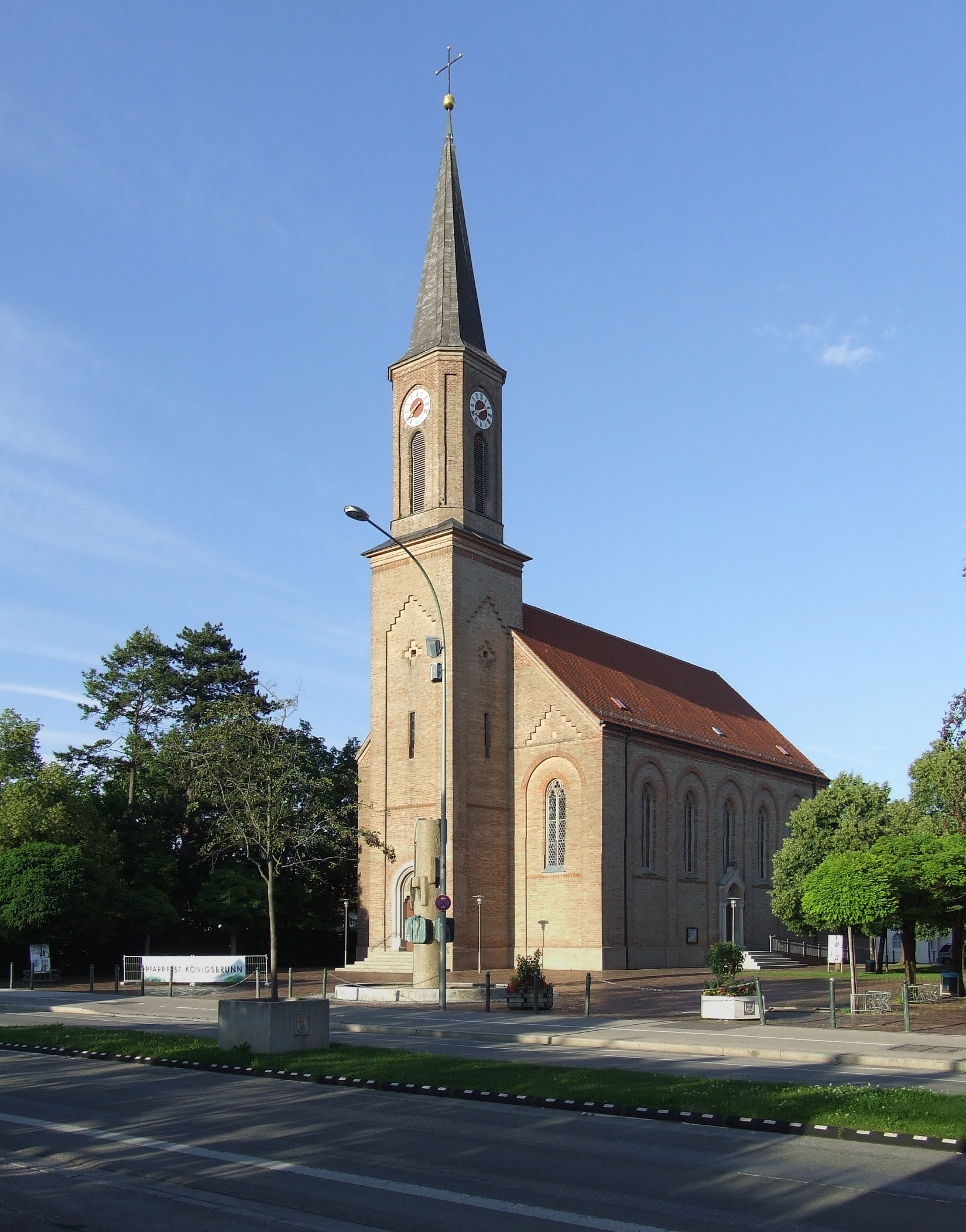
Church of St. Ulrich

== Mayors since 1900 ==
1900–1911: Johannes Wahl
1912–1924: Jakob Pfitzenmaier
1935–1945: Jakob Schreijak
1945: Hermann Herget
1945–1948: Xaver Salvamoser
1948–1984: Fritz Wohlfarth
1984–1996: Adam Metzner (CSU)
1996–2014: Ludwig Fröhlich
since 2014: Franz Feigl (born 1970) (CSU)

== Public safety ==
=== Police ===
The responsible police station for Königsbrunn is the police station of Bobingen.

=== Rescue service ===
To Königsbrunn the ambulance comes from Bobingen, Haunstetten or Mering, normally.

=== Fire brigade ===
The fire station of the volunteer fire brigade of Königsbrunn is located at St.-Johannes-Straße 42 in Königsbrunn. Here a Löschzug (platoon for fire fighting) and a Rüstzug (platoon for technical help, e.g. road accidents) are stationed. There is no fixed area of responsibility. The public-safety answering point (PSAP) of Augsburg is responsible for alerting the fire brigade. The PSAP is always alerting the closest rescue vehicle to an emergency. Administrative borders like counties etc. do not matter here. The area of operation is about Königbrunn itself including the 4 lane B17 and for support the towns around.

== Attractions ==
- Mercateum, the world's biggest globe to rely on a historical map

== Twin towns – sister cities ==
Königsbrunn is twinned with:

- Rab, Croatia

== Notable people ==
- Wolfgang Knabe (born 1950), cultural scientist and expedition leader
- Darius Kampa (born 1977), football player and manager
- Markus Thorandt (born 1981), footballer
- Steffen Tölzer (born 1985), ice hockey player
