= Stengel & Co =

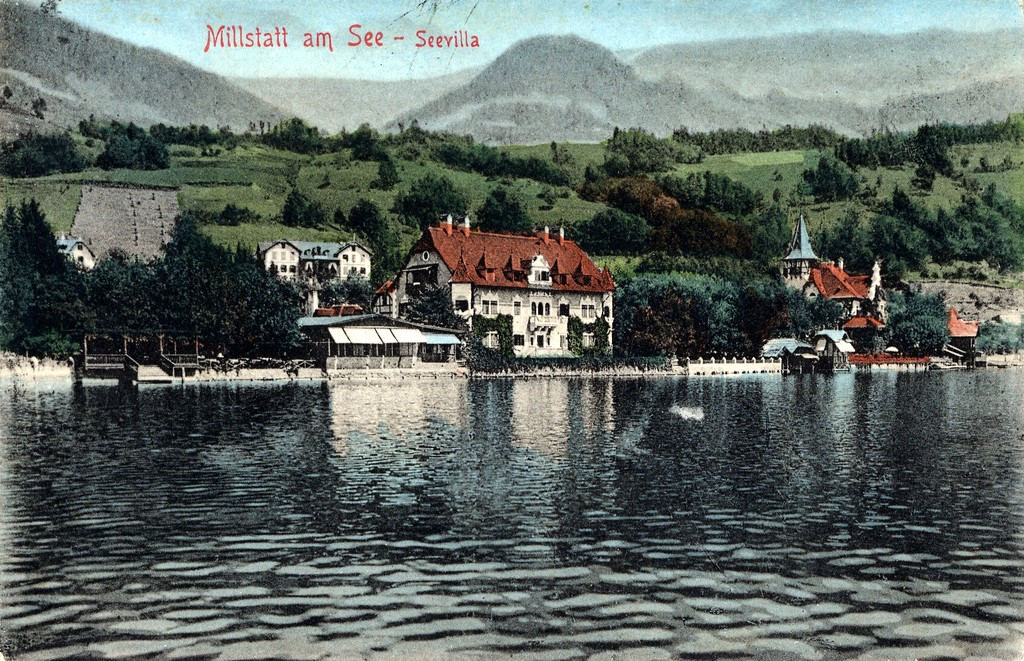
Millstatt am See, Austria, 1907 Stengel & Co postcard

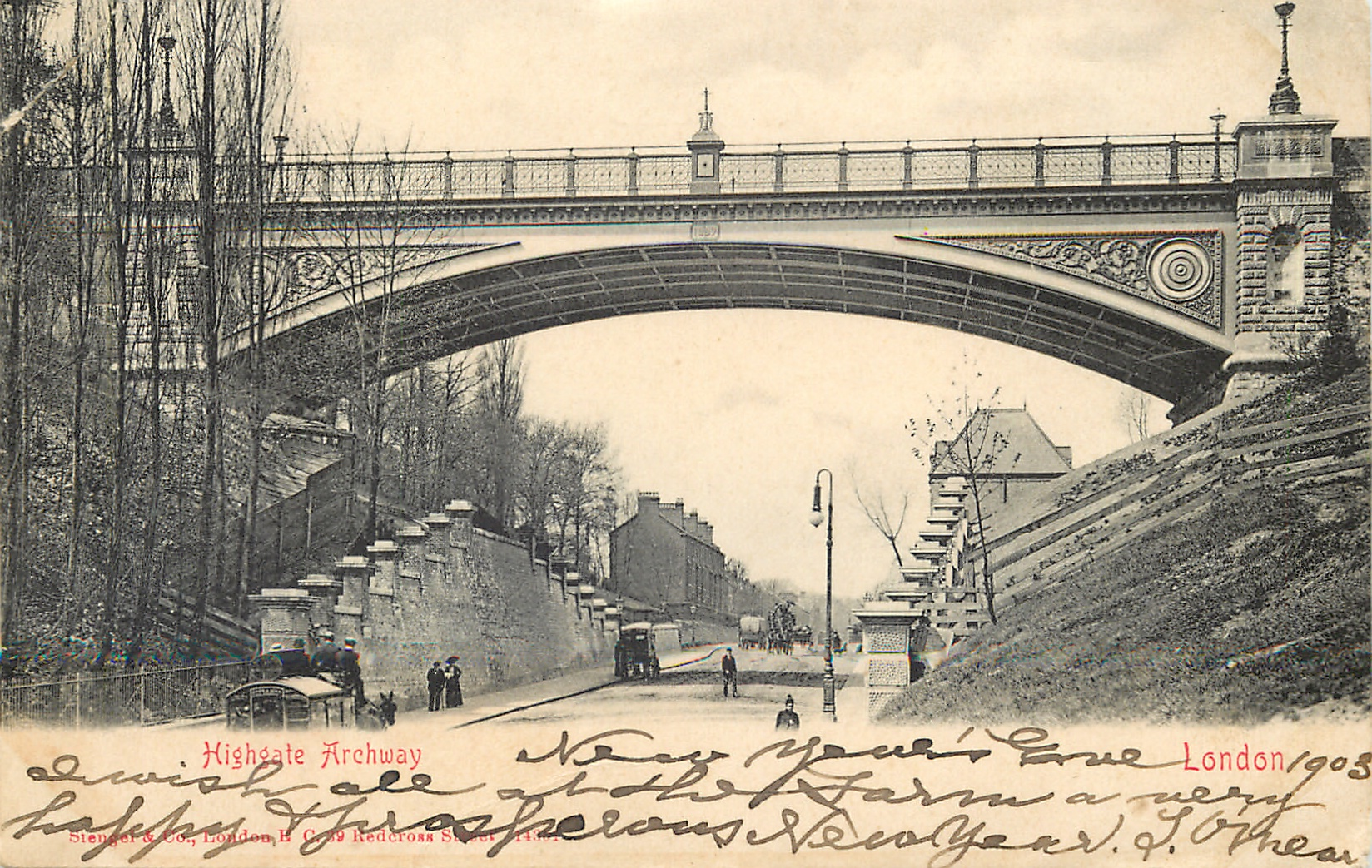
Archway, London, Stengel & Co postcard, sent 1903/04

Stengel & Co was a Dresden-based German printing company, that in the first decade of the 20th century became the largest postcard manufacturer in the world.

Stengel & Markert was founded in 1885 by Emil Stengel and Heinrich Markert after they bought the collotype printer, Scherer & Engler. In about 1889, Markert left to start his own printing business, and the company became Stengel & Co.
