= European Coastal Airlines =

Croatian seaplane operator from 2014 to 2016

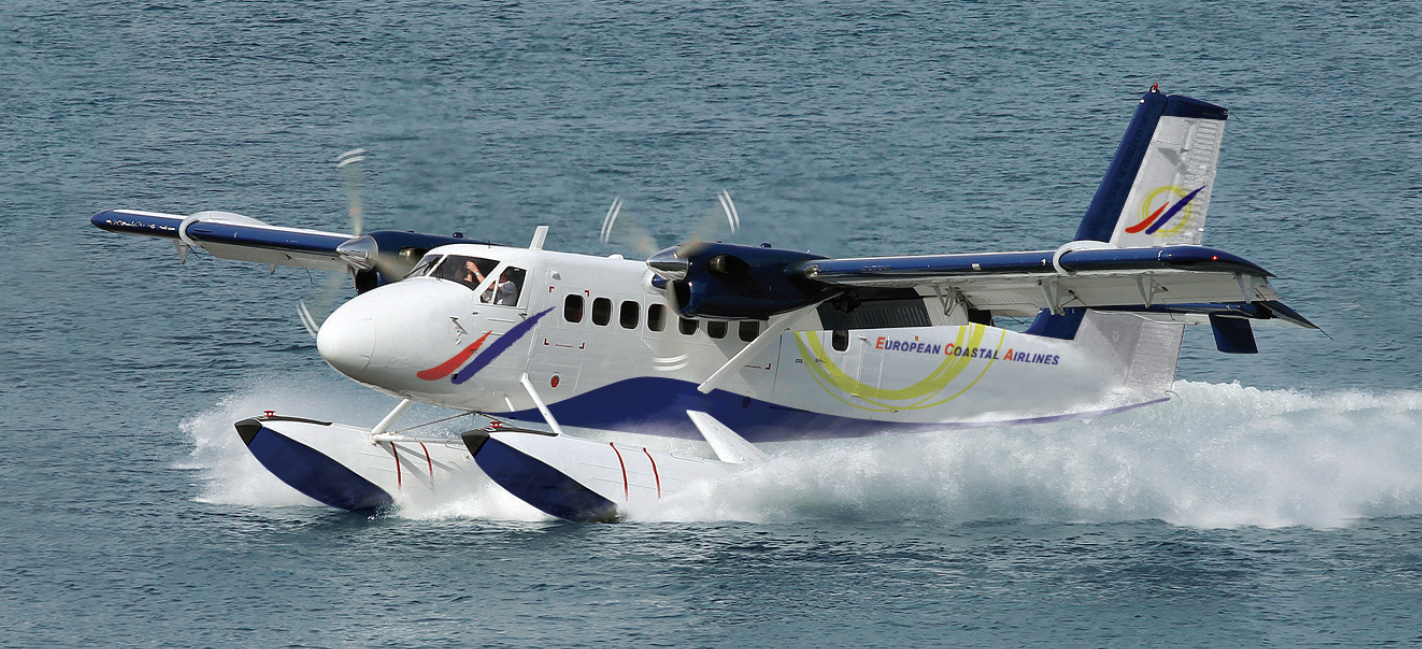
- De Havilland Canada DHC-6 Twin Otter
IATA	ICAO	Call sign
WL	ECB	COASTAL CLIPPER
- Founded: 2000
- Commenced operations: 27 August 2014
- Ceased operations: October 2016
- Fleet size: 4
- Destinations: 11
- Headquarters: Split, Croatia
- Key people: Klaus-Dieter Martin (CEO)
- Website: ec-air.eu

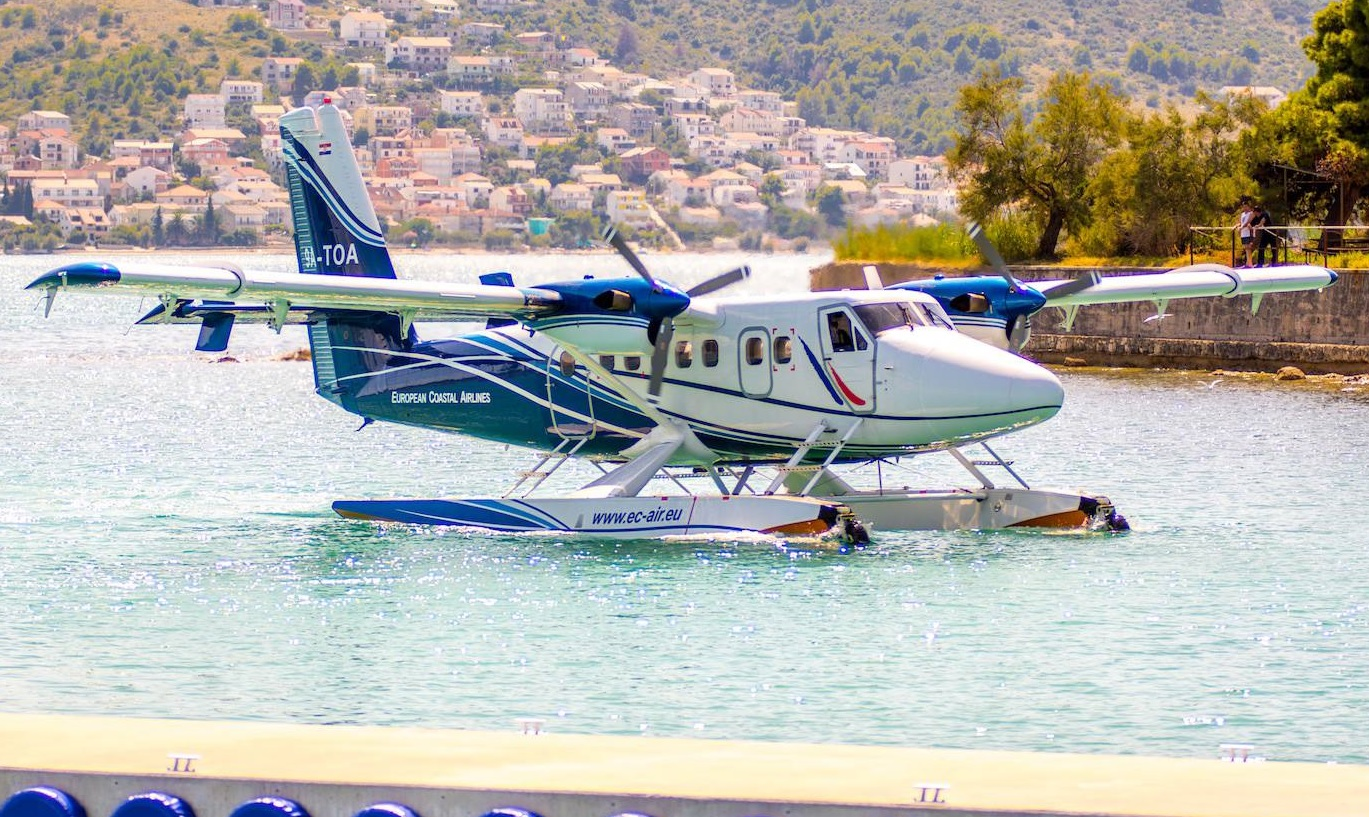
De Havilland Canada DHC-6 Twin Otter near the water terminal of Split Airport

European Coastal Airlines was a Croatian seaplane operator headquartered in Split. Founded in 2000, the company launched scheduled services in August 2014 and served domestic flights within Croatia as well as services to nearby Italy. The company slogan was We connect Croatia! The airline ceased all operations in 2016.

== History ==
The company was established in September 2000, by the Croatian company Obalna Kapitalna Ulaganja d.o.o. from Zagreb, Croatia, and European SeaPlane Service (ESPS) GmbH, from Landsberied, Germany. The airline flew promotional flights using a restored vintage Grumman Goose in 2000. The Slobodna Dalmacija daily reported in August 2002 that the company had acquired licences to land at 25 destinations around the Croatian Adriatic, including the Zadar harbour. According to Croatian law, seaplane operations must obtain licences from both the local civil aviation and maritime authorities, along with concessions normally required for all businesses along the coast, in addition to special permits issued by the Harbormasters’ offices for each harbour they wish to use.

In the early 2000s, the project was put on hold, but was re-launched in 2007 when they were joined by a Croatian investor.

In August 2014, the company won the necessary permits to launch scheduled services connecting Split and Jelsa on the island of Hvar on 27 August 2014. On 6 October 2014, the company started scheduled flights between Zagreb and the island of Rab, but the service was suspended through the winter and resumed in April 2015.

In July 2015, European Coastal Airlines signed a 10-year concession contract for building and operating water terminal in Port of Split after intervention from Croatian Minister of Maritime Affairs Transport and Infrastructure Siniša Hajdaš Dončić. Scheduled services started from the downtown terminal on 10 August 2015.

The first trans-Adriatic routes between Croatia and Italy began in November 2015 with four weekly flights between Split downtown and Ancona and also between Rijeka Airport and Ancona.

The airline was grounded in August 2016 when its AOC was temporarily withdrawn by the Croatian Civil Aviation Agency, apparently due to safety concerns. As a result of ongoing legal discussions, the airline suspended all operations and cancelled 130 jobs. In December 2016, the CEO announced that operations would resume in 2017. As of February 2017, the company's website and Facebook page hasn't been updated with any new information and no flights were resumed by the end of July.

On 2 May 2017, the Commercial Court in Split initiated a pre-bankruptcy procedure at the request of the company filed on 18 April 2017.

== Destinations ==
European Coastal Airlines operated services to the following scheduled destinations (as of November 2015):

Ground terminals

- Croatia
  - Mali Lošinj – Lošinj Airport
  - Rijeka – Rijeka Airport
  - Zadar – Zadar Airport
- Italy
  - Ancona – Marche Airport
  - Pescara – Abruzzo Airport

Water terminals

- Split Airport (Water terminal) base
- Split Seaport
- Jelsa
- Lastovo
- Lumbarda
- Pula
- Rab
- Vela Luka

== Fleet ==
The European Coastal Airlines fleet included the following aircraft (as of June 2016):

- 4 De Havilland Canada DHC-6 Twin Otter

The aircraft are fitted with Wipline 13000 floats; Two are capable for water and ground landing (amphibian): 9A-TOA and 9A-TOB, the other two only of water landing (floats): 9A-TOC and 9A-TOE.

== See also ==
- List of seaplane operators
