= Palit, Croatia =

Settlement in Primorje-Gorski Kotar County, Croatia

Palit
- Settlement
- Interactive map of Palit
- Location of Palit in Croatia
- Coordinates: 44°45′54″N 14°45′07″E
- Country: Croatia
- County: Primorje-Gorski Kotar
- City: Rab

Area
  - Total: 2.0 km^{2} (0.77 sq mi)

Population (2021)
  - Total: 1,580
  - Density: 790/km^{2} (2,000/sq mi)
- Time zone: UTC+1 (CET)
  - Summer (DST): UTC+2 (CEST)
- Postal code: 51280 Rab
- Area code: +385 (0)51

Palit is a settlement in the City of Rab in Croatia. In 2021, its population was 1580.

== Demographics ==
Palit: Population trends 1857–2021
v

population	117		150	153	29	192	192		158	446	507	754	1348	1567	1593	1687	1580
	1857	1869	1880	1890	1900	1910	1921	1931	1948	1953	1961	1971	1981	1991	2001	2011	2021

Sources: Croatian Bureau of Statistics publications
