= List of political office-holders in Vojvodina =

These are lists of political office-holders in Vojvodina. The lists also include local rulers of Banat, Bačka and Srem, including parts of mentioned regions, which are not part of present-day Vojvodina, as well as other rulers of larger political units that had specific local ties to territory of present-day Vojvodina.

== Ancient period ==
=== Roman emperors ===
- Maximinus, emperor (235–238), ruled from residence in Sirmium
- Decius Traian, emperor (249–251), born in village Budalia near Sirmium
- Ingenuus, emperor (260), proclaimed himself emperor in Sirmium
- Regalianus, emperor (260), proclaimed himself emperor in Sirmium
- Claudius II, emperor (268–270), spent most of his life in Sirmium
- Aurelian, emperor (270–275), born in Sirmium
- Probus, emperor (276–282), born in Sirmium
- Maximianus Herculius, emperor (285–310), born near Sirmium
- Galerius, emperor (305–311), ruled as caesar during the Tetrarchy from residence in Sirmium (293–296)
- Crispus, caesar of the empire, proclaimed caesar in Sirmium in 317
- Constantine II, caesar of the empire, proclaimed caesar in Sirmium in 317
- Vetranion, emperor, proclaimed himself emperor in Sirmium in 350
- Constantius II, emperor (337–361), born in Sirmium
- Gratian, emperor (367–383), born in Sirmium
- Theodosius I the Great, emperor (378–395), proclaimed himself emperor in Sirmium in 378

=== Roman prefects ===
- Valerius Licinius, prefect of the Diocese of Pannonia with residence in Sirmium (308–314)
- Apricanus, prefect of the Pannonia Secunda province with residence in Sirmium (355)
- Aurelius Victor, prefect of the Pannonia Secunda province (in the time of the emperor Julijan)
- Messala, prefect of the Pannonia Secunda province (373)
- Petronius Probus, prefect in Sirmium (374)
- Leontius, prefect of the Prefecture of Illyricum with residence in Sirmium (426)
- Apraemis, prefect of the Prefecture of Illyricum with residence in Sirmium (before 441)

=== Other ===
- Illyrian rulers
  - Baton, one of three leaders of Illyrian uprising against Romans in Pannonia and Dalmatia in 6 AD.
  - Pinnes, one of three leaders of Illyrian uprising against Romans in Pannonia and Dalmatia in 6 AD.
- Iazyge rulers
  - Bakadaspes, ruler of Iazyges (before 180)
  - Zanticus, king of Iazyges (2nd century)
  - Beuca or Beukan, king of Iazyges (470/472)
  - Babay or Babai, king of Iazyges (470/472)
- Hun rulers
  - Uldin, khan of the Western Huns, ruler of Banat (390–411)
  - Charaton
  - Octar (together with Rua)
  - Rua
  - Bleda (together with Attila)
  - Attila
  - Ellak
- Gepid rulers
  - Ardaric king of Gepidia (Banat, Eastern Syrmia, Western Oltenia)
  - Giesmus
  - Thraustila, king of the Gepids with residence in Sirmium (473)
  - Trasseric
  - Gunderith (together with Trasseric)
  - Mundus (together with Elemund)
  - Elemund
  - Thurisind
  - Cunimund, king of the Gepids with residence in Sirmium
- Longobard ruler (Gausian)
  - Alboin

== Middle Ages ==
- Avar administration
  - Kuber, ruler of Syrmia (7th century)
  - Buta-ul, Avar noble, ruler of Banat and Bačka (796)
- Bulgarian dukes
  - Salan, Bulgarian duke, ruler of Bačka (9th century)
  - Glad, Bulgarian duke, ruler of Banat (9th century)
  - Ahtum, Bulgarian duke, ruler of Banat (11th century)
  - Sermon, Bulgarian duke, ruler of Syrmia (11th century)
- Byzantine local rulers
  - Constantine Diogenes, archon of Sirmium (1018–1028)
- Local rulers during administration of the Kingdom of Hungary
  - Giletus, duke of Syrmia (1231)
  - Stefan Lazarević, Serbian despot (1402–1427)
  - Đurađ Branković, Serbian despot (1427–1456)
  - Vuk Grgurević, Serbian despot (1471–1485)
  - Lovro Iločki, duke of Syrmia (1477–1524)
  - Đorđe Branković, Serbian despot (1486–1496)
  - Jovan Branković, Serbian despot (1496–1502)
  - Ivaniš Berislav, Serbian despot (1504–1514)
  - Stefan Berislav, Serbian despot (1520–1535)
  - Radič Božić, Serbian despot (1527–1528)
  - Pavle Bakić, Serbian despot (1537)
  - Stefan Štiljanović, Serbian despot (1537–1540)
- Rulers of Syrmia
  - Stefan Dragutin, king of Lower Syrmia (1282–1316)
  - Stefan Vladislav II, king of Lower Syrmia (1316–1325)
  - Ugrin Čak, ruler of Upper Syrmia (before 1311)
- Serb rulers
  - Jovan Nenad, self-proclaimed Serbian emperor (1526–1527)
  - Radoslav Čelnik, duke of Syrmia (1527–1530)

== Modern era ==
=== Ottoman Empire ===
- Eyalet of Temeşvar
  - Kazim-bey or Gazi Kasim-pasha, beylerbey of the Eyalet of Temeşvar (1552–1554)
  - Hasan-pasha, beylerbey of the Eyalet of Temeşvar (1594)
  - Sofi Sinan-pasha, beylerbey of the Eyalet of Temeşvar (1594)
  - Hasan-pasha The Younger, beylerbey of the Eyalet of Temeşvar (1594)
  - Ibrahim-pasha, beylerbey of the Eyalet of Temeşvar (1687)
  - Ibrahim-pasha, beylerbey of the Eyalet of Temeşvar (1701-)
- Sanjak of Segedin
  - Hasan Predojević, bey of the Sanjak of Segedin (1592)
- Banat uprising
  - Teodor Nestorović, leader of the Banat uprising (1594)
  - Sava Ban, leader of the Banat uprising (1594)
  - Velja Mironić, leader of the Banat uprising (1594)

=== Habsburg Empire ===
- Appointed leader of Habsburg Serbs
  - Jovan Monasterlija, vice-duke of Serbs (1691–1706)
- Banat of Temeswar
  - Claudius Mercy, governor of the Banat of Temeswar
  - Franz Leopold Engelshofen, governor of the Banat of Temeswar

=== Austrian Empire ===
- Tican's Rebellion
  - Teodor Avramović Tican, leader of the rebellion (1807)
- Serbian Vojvodina
  - Stevan Šupljikac, duke of Serbian Vojvodina (1848)
  - Josif Rajačić, administrator of Serbian Vojvodina (1848–1849)
- Great Voivodes of the Voivodeship of Serbia and Banat of Temeschwar
  - Franz Joseph I, Emperor of Austria and Great Voivod (Great Duke) of Voivodeship of Serbia and Banat of Temeschwar (1849–1867)

=== Austria-Hungary ===
- Great Voivodes of the Voivodeship of Serbia and Banat of Temeschwar
  - Franz Joseph I, Emperor of Austria and Great Voivod (Great Duke) of Voivodeship of Serbia and Banat of Temeschwar (1867–1916)
  - Karl I, Emperor of Austria and Great Voivod (Great Duke) of Voivodeship of Serbia and Banat of Temeschwar (1916–1918)
- Governors of the Voivodeship of Serbia and Banat of Temeschwar
  - Ferdinand Mayerhofer, governor (1849–1851)
  - Johann Coronini-Cronberg, governor (1851–1859)
  - Josip Šokčević, governor (1859–1860)
  - Karl August von Bigot de Saint-Quentin, governor (1860)

=== Kingdom of Serbs, Croats, and Slovenes / Kingdom of Yugoslavia ===
- Banat Republic
  - Dr. Otto Roth, commissioner-in-chief of the Banat Republic (1918–1919)
- Banat, Bačka and Baranja
  - Dr. Jovan Lalošević, president of the People's Administration of Banat, Bačka and Baranja (1918–1919)
  - Slavko Miletić, president of the Great People's Council (1918–1919)
- Bans of Danube Banovina (1929–1941):
  - Daka Popović (1929–1930)
  - Radoslav Dunjić (1930)
  - Svetomir Matić (1930–1931)
  - Milan Nikolić (1931–1933)
  - Dobrica Matković (1933–1935)
  - Milojko Vasović (1935)
  - Svetislav Paunović (1935–1936)
  - Svetislav Rajić (1936–1939)
  - Jovan Radivojević (1939–1940)
  - Branko Kijurina (1940–1941)
  - Milorad Vlaškalin (1941)

=== World War II ===
- Civilian Commissioner of Banat:
  - Joseph-Sepp Lapp (1941–1944)

== Contemporary period ==
=== Federal People's Republic of Yugoslavia / Socialist Federal Republic of Yugoslavia ===
- Presidents of the Presidency of Vojvodina (1974–1991):
  - Radovan Vlajković (1974–1981)
  - Predrag Vladisavljević (1981–1982)
  - Danilo Kekić (1982–1983)
  - Đorđe Radosavljević (1983–1984)
  - Nandor Major (1984–1985)
  - Predrag Vladisavljević (1985–1986)
  - Đorđe Radosavljević (1986–1988)
  - Nandor Major (1988–1989)
  - Jugoslav Kostić (1989–1991)
- Presidents of the Government of Vojvodina:
  - Aleksandar Šević (1945–1948)
  - Luka Mrkšić (1948–1953)
  - Stevan Doronjski (1953)
  - Geza Tikvicki (1953–1962)
  - Đurica Jojkić (1962–1963)
  - Ilija Rajačić (1963–1967)
  - Stipan Marušić (1967–1971)
  - Franjo Nađ (1971–1974)
  - Nikola Kmezić (1974–1982)
  - Živan Marelj (1982–1986)
  - Jon Srbovan (1986–1989)
  - Sredoje Erdeljan (1989)
  - Jovan Radić (1989–1991)
  - Radoman Božović (1991)
  - Jovan Radić (1991–1992)
- Presidents of the Assembly of Vojvodina:
  - Aleksandar Šević (1945–1946)
  - Mateja Matejić, Ivan Melvinger, Đorđe Marinković (1946–1947)
  - Jovan Doroški, Đurica Jojkić, Isa Jovanović (1947–1948)
  - Đurica Jojkić (1948–1950)
  - Petar Milovanović (1950–1951)
  - Danilo Kekić (1951–1953)
  - Luka Mrkšić, Stevan Doronjski (1953–1958)
  - Stevan Doronjski (1958–1963)
  - Radovan Vlajković (1963–1967)
  - Ilija Rajačić (1967–1973)
  - Sreta Kovačević (1973)
  - Vilmoš Molnar (1974–1982)
  - Đorđe Stojšić (1982–1983)
  - Ištvan Rajcan (1983–1984)
  - Dobrivoj Radić (1984–1985)
  - Rudi Sova (1985–1986)
  - Dobrivoj Radić (1986–1988)
  - Živan Marelj (1988–1989)
  - Janoš Šreder (1989)
  - Branko Kljajić (1989–1990)
  - Verona Ádám Bokros (1990–1991)
  - Damnjan Radenković (1991–1992)

=== Federal Republic of Yugoslavia / Serbia and Montenegro ===
- Presidents of the Government of Vojvodina:
  - Koviljko Lovre (1992–1993)
  - Boško Perošević (1993–2000)
  - Damnjan Radenković (2000)
  - Đorđe Đukić (2000–2004)
  - Bojan Pajtić (2004–2006)
- Presidents of the Assembly of Vojvodina:
  - Svetislav Krstić (1992–1993)
  - Milutin Stojković (1993–1997)
  - Živorad Smiljanić (1997–2000)
  - Nenad Čanak (2000–2004)
  - Bojan Kostreš (2004–2006)

=== Republic of Serbia ===
- Presidents of the Government of Vojvodina:
  - Bojan Pajtić (2006–2012)
  - Igor Mirović (2004–2012)
  - Maja Gojković (2024–)
- Presidents of the Assembly of Vojvodina:
  - Bojan Kostreš (2006–2008)
  - Sándor Egeresi (2008–2012)
  - István Pásztor (2012–2023)
  - Momo Čolaković (2023–2024)
  - Bálint Juhász (2024–)

== Gallery ==
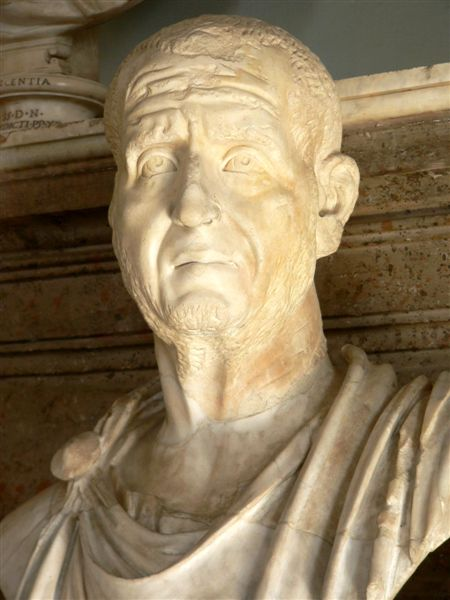
Traianus Decius, Roman Emperor (249–251)

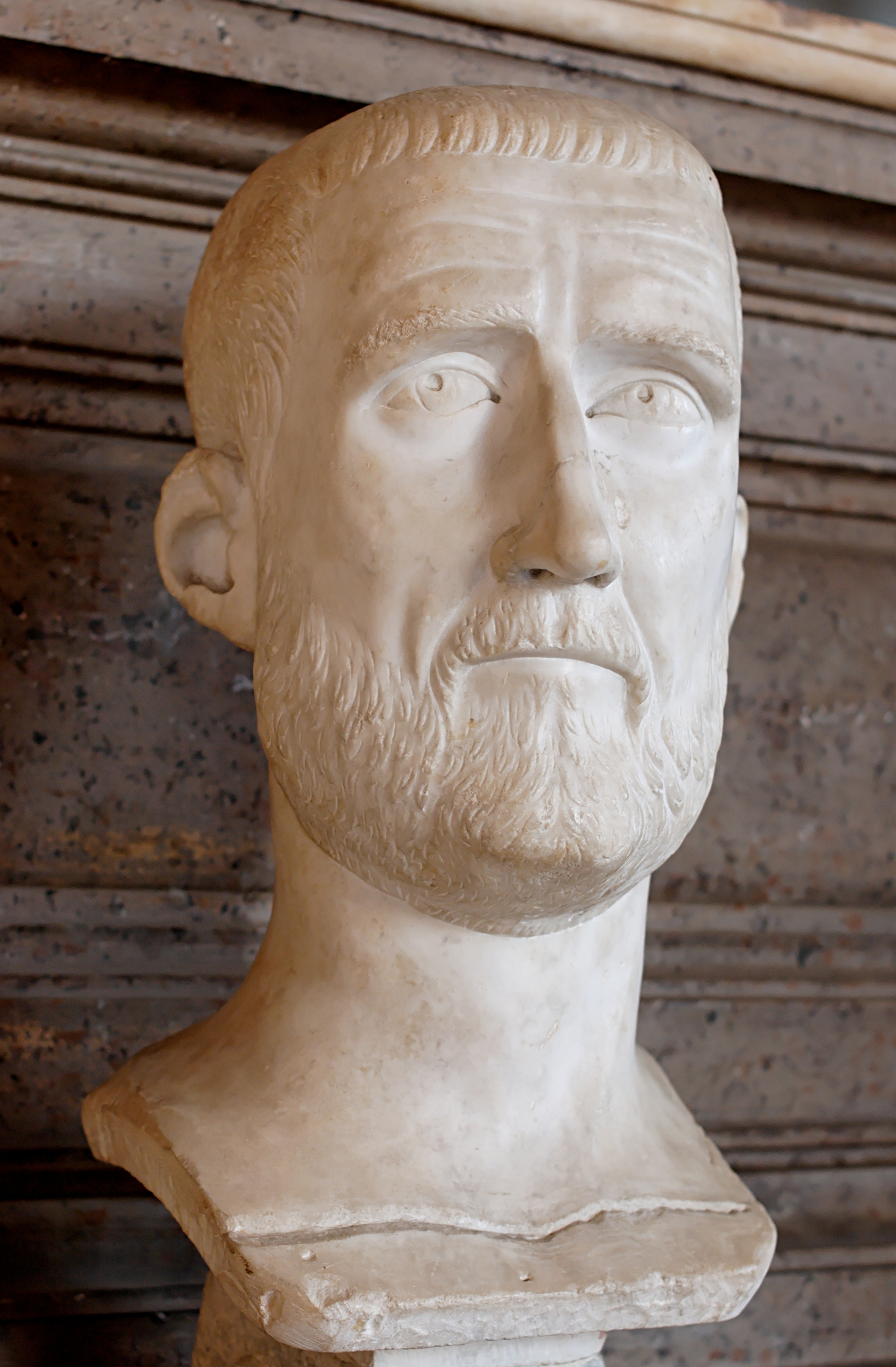
Marcus Aurelius Probus, Roman Emperor (276–282)

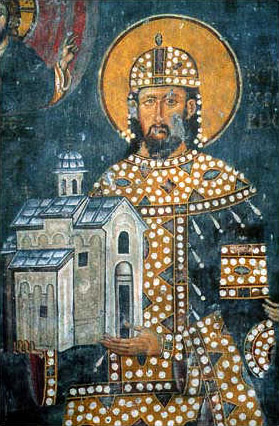
Stefan Dragutin, King of Syrmia (1282–1316)

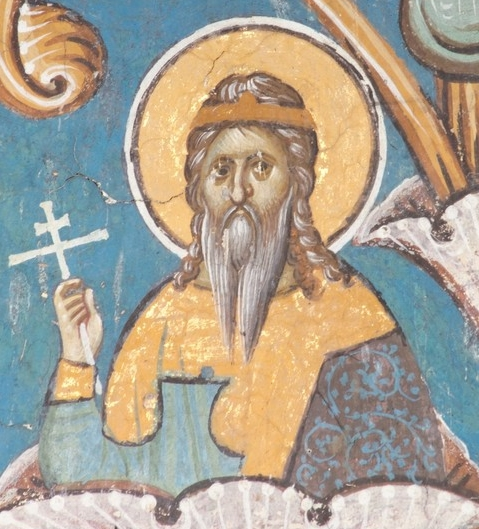
Stefan Vladislav II, King of Syrmia (1316–1325)
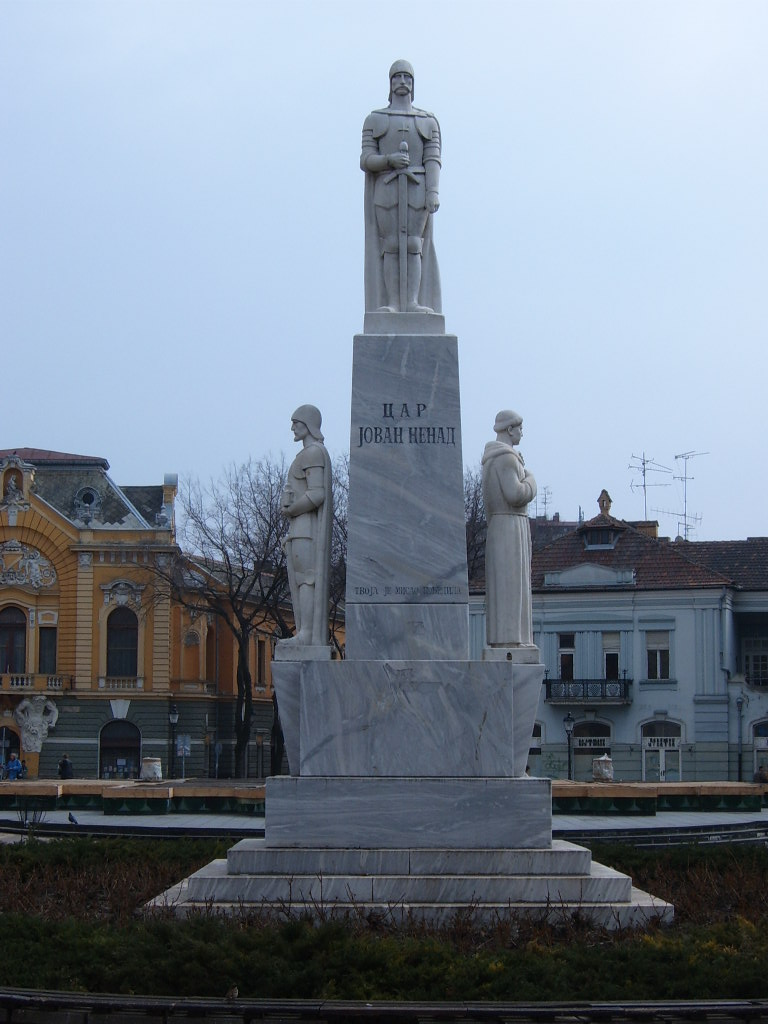
Jovan Nenad, self-proclaimed Serbian Emperor (1526–1527)

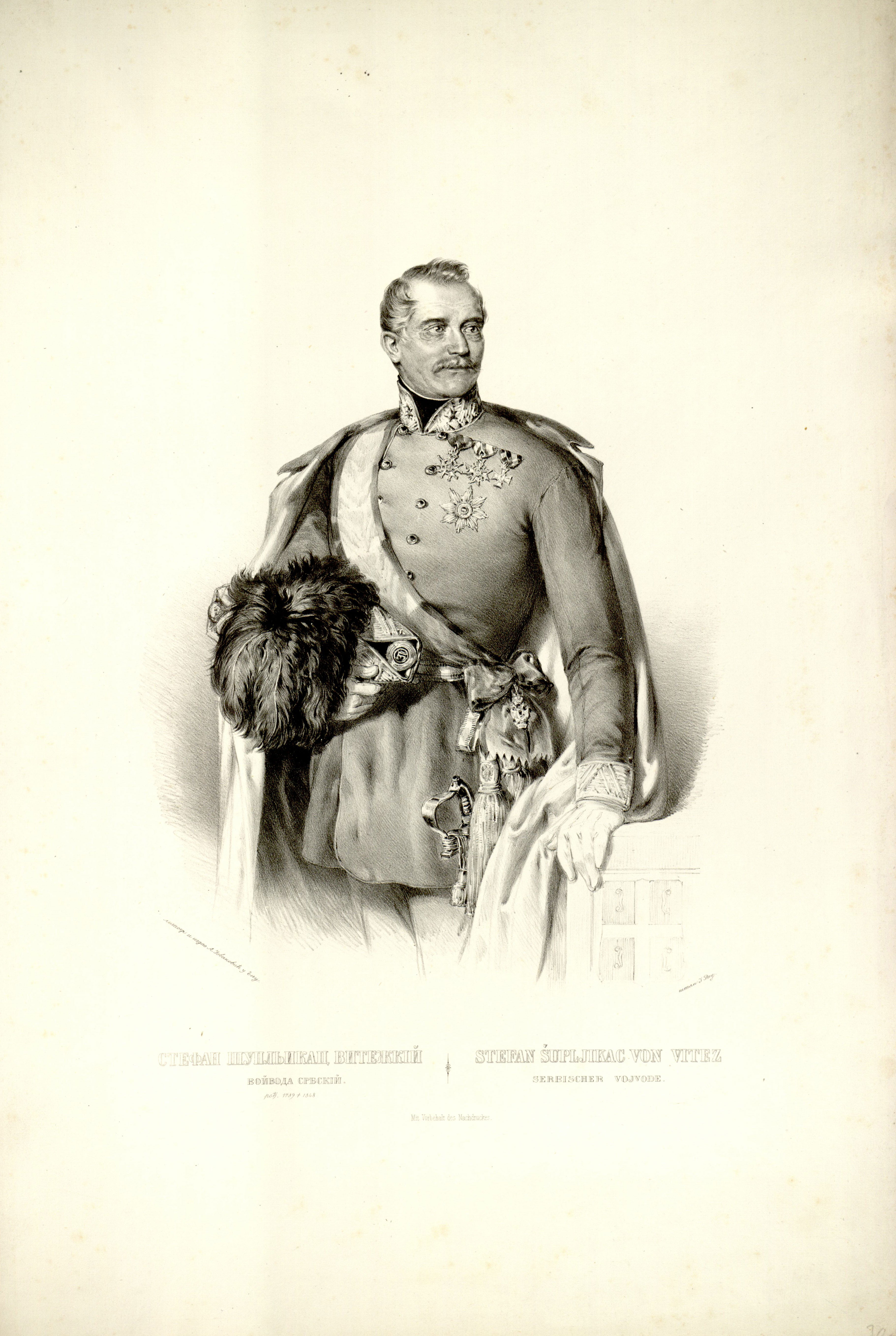
Stevan Šupljikac, voivod (duke) of Serbian Vojvodina (1848)

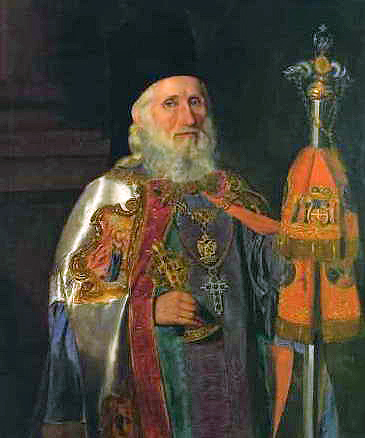
Josif Rajačić, administrator of Serbian Vojvodina (1848–1849)

== See also ==
- List of Serbian monarchs
- History of Vojvodina
- History of Serbia
