= President of the Government of Vojvodina =

Head of provincial government of Vojvodina

President of the Provincial Government of Vojvodina
- Председник Покрајинске владе Војводине; Predsednik Pokrajinske vlade Vojvodine
- Coats of arms of Vojvodina

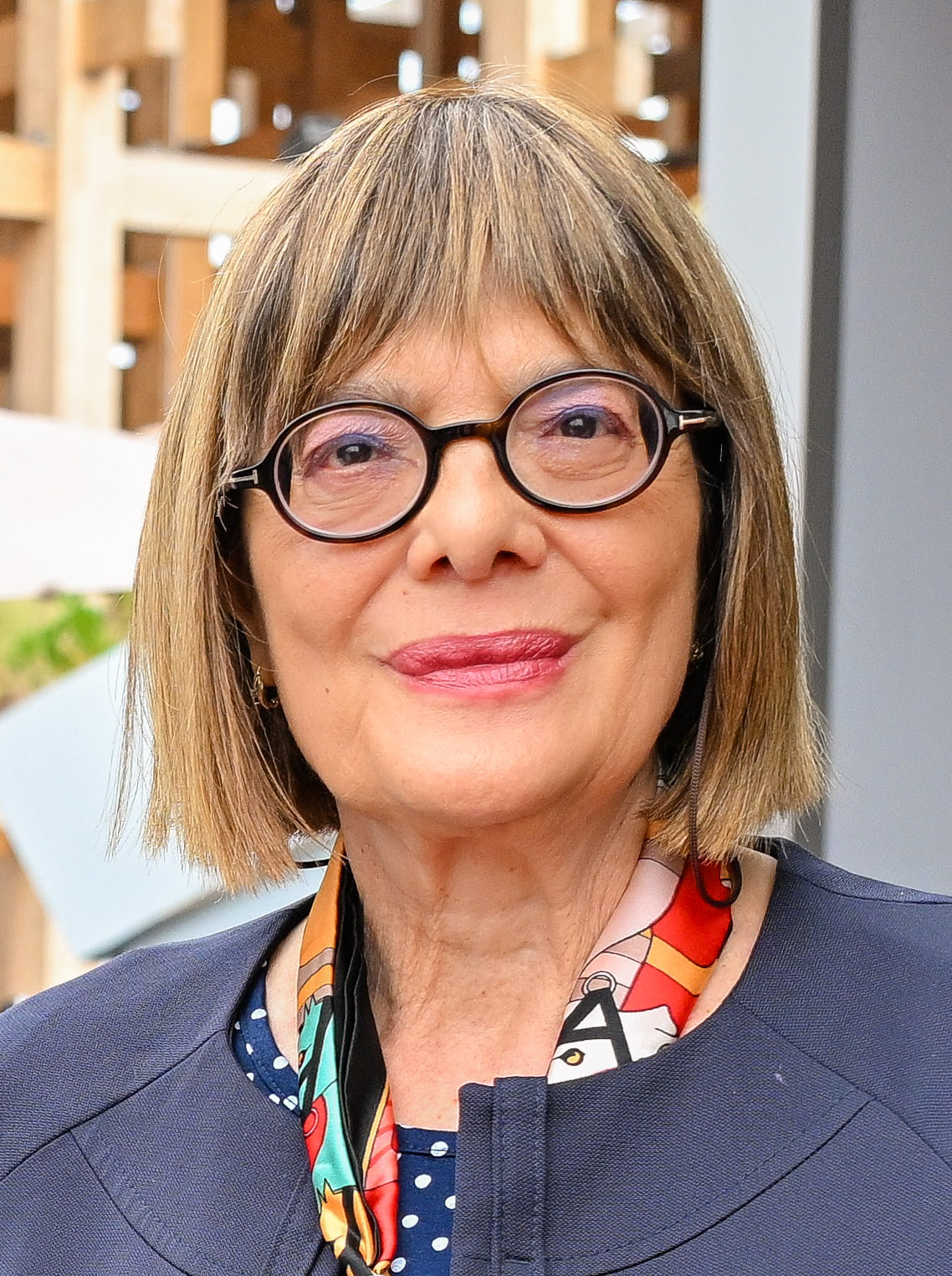
- Incumbent; Maja Gojković since 8 May 2024
- Provincial Government of Vojvodina
- Seat: Banovina Palace, Bulevar Mihajla Pupina 16, Novi Sad
- Constituting instrument: Statute
- Inaugural holder: Bojan Pajtić
- Formation: 14 December 2009; 16 years ago
- Website: vojvodina.gov.rs

The President of the Provincial Government of Vojvodina (Serbian: Председник Покрајинске владе Војводине, romanized: Predsednik Pokrajinske vlade Vojvodine) serves as the head of Provincial Government of Vojvodina, an autonomous province of Serbia.

The current president of the Provincial Government of Vojvodina is Maja Gojković, since 8 May 2024.

== List of presidents ==
=== Socialist Autonomous Province of Vojvodina ===
Parties

KPV/SKV

No.	Name (Birth–Death)	Portrait	Term of office		Political party
Prime Minister; 1945–1953
1	Aleksandar Šević (1897–1975)		9 April 1945	5 September 1948	KPV
2	Luka Mrkšić (1899–1976)		5 September 1948	20 March 1953	KPV renamed in 1952 to SKV
Chairman of the Executive Council; 1953–1990
1	Stevan Doronjski (1919–1981)		20 March 1953	December 1953	SKV
2	Géza Tikvicki (1917–1999)		December 1953	22 July 1962	SKV
3	Đurica Jojkić (1914–1981)		22 July 1962	18 July 1963	SKV
4	Ilija Rajačić (1923–2005)		18 July 1963	20 April 1967	SKV
5	Stipan Marušić (1926–1974)		20 April 1967	October 1971	SKV
6	Franjo Nađ (1923–1986)		October 1971	6 May 1974	SKV
7	Nikola Kmezić (1919–2009)		6 May 1974	5 May 1982	SKV
8	Živan Marelj (born 1938)		5 May 1982	May 1986	SKV
9	Ion Srbovan (1930–2018)		May 1986	24 October 1989	SKV
10	Sredoje Erdeljan (1939–2011)		24 October 1989	1989	SKV
11	Jovan Radić (born 1949)		1989	1990	SKV

=== Autonomous Province of Vojvodina ===
Parties

SPS DS SNS

No.	Portrait	Name (Birth–Death)	Term of office			Political party	Election
No.	Portrait	Name (Birth–Death)	Took office	Left office	Time in office	Political party	Election
Chairman of the Executive Council; 1990–2009
1	Jovan Radić	Jovan Radić (born 1949)	1990	1991	0–1 years	SPS	—
2	Radoman Božović	Radoman Božović (born 1953)	1991	23 December 1991	0 years	SPS	—
(1)	Jovan Radić	Jovan Radić (born 1949)	23 December 1991	July 1992	191 days	SPS	—
3	Koviljko Lovre	Koviljko Lovre (born 1954)	July 1992	February 1993	215 days	SPS	1992
4	Boško Perošević	Boško Perošević (1956–2000)	February 1993	13 May 2000 (Assassinated) †	7 years, 102 days	SPS	1996
5	Damnjan Radenković	Damnjan Radenković (born 1939)	13 May 2000	23 October 2000	163 days	SPS	—
6	Đorđe Đukić	Đorđe Đukić (born 1948)	23 October 2000	30 October 2004	4 years, 7 days	DS	2000
7	Bojan Pajtić	Bojan Pajtić (born 1970)	30 October 2004	14 December 2009	5 years, 45 days	DS	2004; 2008
President of the Provincial Government; 2009–present
1	Bojan Pajtić	Bojan Pajtić (born 1970)	14 December 2009	20 June 2016	6 years, 189 days	DS	2012
2	Igor Mirović	Igor Mirović (born 1968)	20 June 2016	8 May 2024	7 years, 323 days	SNS	2016; 2020
3	Maja Gojković	Maja Gojković (born 1963)	8 May 2024	Incumbent	2 years, 122 days	SNS	2023

== See also ==
- President of the Assembly of Vojvodina
- President of the Presidency of SAP Vojvodina
- Lists of political office-holders in Vojvodina
