= President of the Presidency of SAP Vojvodina =

President of the Presidency of Socialist Autonomous Province of Vojvodina
- Precursor: Office established
- Formation: November 1974
- First holder: Radovan Vlajković
- Final holder: Jugoslav Kostić
- Abolished: January 1991
- Succession: Office abolished

In the Socialist Autonomous Province of Vojvodina, which was at the time one of the two socialist autonomous provinces of the Socialist Republic of Serbia and one of the federal units of the Socialist Federal Republic of Yugoslavia, a single-party system was in place. During this time there were six heads of state, all from the ranks of the League of Communists of Yugoslavia (SKJ). The federal party was organized into six sub-organizations - the republic parties, one for each of the six federal republics. Vojvodinian politicians and presidents of the presidency of the period were members of the League of Communists of Yugoslavia through their membership in the League of Communists of Vojvodina (SKV), the Vojvodinian part of the federal party (as was respectively the case with all Yugoslav politicians).

League of Communists of Yugoslavia League of Communists of Vojvodina Socialist Party of Serbia

No.	Head of State		Lifespan	Term of office		Party	Notes
Presidents of the Presidency; 1974 - 1991
1	Radovan Vlajković	Radovan Vlajković	1922–2001	November; 1974	November; 1981	League of Communists of Yugoslavia	The first President of the Presidency of Vojvodina. Served the longest term in office.
2	Predrag Vladisavljević	Predrag Vladisavljević	1919–2000	November; 1981	May; 1982	League of Communists of Yugoslavia	First term.
3	Danilo Kekić	Danilo Kekić	1918–1999	May; 1982	May; 1983	League of Communists of Yugoslavia	
4	Đorđe Radosavljević	Đorđe Radosavljević	1921–2020	May; 1983	4 May 1984	League of Communists of Yugoslavia	First term.
5	Nándor Major	Nándor Major	1931–2022	4 May 1984	7 May 1985	League of Communists of Yugoslavia	First term.
(2)	Predrag Vladisavljević	Predrag Vladisavljević	1919–2000	7 May 1985	May; 1986	League of Communists of Yugoslavia	Second term.
(4)	Đorđe Radosavljević	Đorđe Radosavljević	1921–2020	May; 1986	May; 1988	League of Communists of Yugoslavia	Second term.
(5)	Nándor Major	Nándor Major	1931–2022	May; 1988	May; 1989	League of Communists of Yugoslavia	Second term.
6	Jugoslav Kostić	Jugoslav Kostić	1939–2025	May; 1989	January; 1991	League of Communists of Yugoslavia (until January 1990)	The last President of the Presidency of Vojvodina. Vojvodina lost most of its autonomy on September 28, 1990.
(6)	Jugoslav Kostić	Jugoslav Kostić	1939–2025	May; 1989	January; 1991	Socialist Party of Serbia (from January 1990)	The last President of the Presidency of Vojvodina. Vojvodina lost most of its autonomy on September 28, 1990.

== See also ==
- List of local rulers of Vojvodina
- President of the Government of Vojvodina
- President of the Assembly of Vojvodina
