= President of the Assembly of Vojvodina =

Head of provincial legislature of Vojvodina

- Председник Скупштине Војводине; Predsednik Skupštine Vojvodine
- Coats of arms of Vojvodina
- Incumbent; Bálint Juhász since 25 April 2024
- Seat: Banovina Palace, Vladike Platona 1, Novi Sad
- Inaugural holder: Aleksandar Šević
- Formation: 1945; 81 years ago
- Website: skupstinavojvodine.gov.rs

The President of the Assembly of Vojvodina (Serbian: Председник скупштине Војводине, romanized: Predsednik skupštine Vojvodine) is the presiding officer of the Assembly of Vojvodina, which serves as the unicameral parliament of Vojvodina, an autonomous province of Serbia.

The current president of the Assembly of Vojvodina is Bálint Juhász, since 25 April 2024.

== List of presidents ==
=== Socialist Autonomous Province of Vojvodina ===
Parties

KPV/SKV

No.	Name (Birth–Death)	Portrait	Term of office		Political party
1	Aleksandar Šević (1897–1975)		1945	1946	KPV
2	Mateja Matejić		1946	1947	KPV
	Ivan Melvinger		1946	1947	KPV
	Đorđe Marinković (1883–1957)		1946	1947	KPV
5	Jovan Doroški		1947	1948	KPV
6	Đurica Jojkić (1914–1981); 1st time		1947	1948	KPV
7	Isa Jovanović (1906–1983)		1947	1948	KPV
(6)	Đurica Jojkić (1914–1981); 2nd time		1948	1950	KPV
8	Petar Milovanović		1950	1951	KPV
9	Danilo Kekić (1918–1999)		1951	April 1953	KPV renamed in 1952 to SKV
10	Luka Mrkšić (1899–1976)		April 1953	December 1953	SKV
11	Stevan Doronjski (1919–1981)		December 1953	18 July 1963	SKV
12	Radovan Vlajković (1922–2001)		18 July 1963	20 April 1967	SKV
13	Ilija Rajačić (1923–2005)		20 April 1967	5 June 1973	SKV
14	Sreten Kovačević (1920–1995)		5 June 1973	November 1974	SKV
15	Vilmoš Molnar (1930–2011)		1974	1982	SKV
16	Đorđe Stojšić (1928–2014)		1982	1983	SKV
17	Ištvan Rajčan (?–2015)		1983	1984	SKV
18	Dobrivoj Radić; 1st time		1984	1985	SKV
19	Rudi Sova		1985	1986	SKV
(18)	Dobrivoj Radić; 2nd time		1986	1988	SKV
20	Živan Marelj (born 1938)		1988	1989	SKV
21	Janoš Šreder		1989	1989	SKV
22	Branko Kljajić		1989	1991	SKV
22	Verona Ádám Bokros (born 1948)		1989	1991	SKV

=== Autonomous Province of Vojvodina ===
SPS LSV VMSZ/SVM PUPS

No.	Portrait	Name (Birth–Death)	Term of office			Political party	Election
No.	Portrait	Name (Birth–Death)	Took office	Left office	Time in office	Political party	Election
1	Damnjan Radenković	Damnjan Radenković (born 1939)	1991	1992	0–1 years	SPS	—
2	Svetislav Krstić	Svetislav Krstić (born 1955)	1992	1993	0–1 years	SPS	1992
3	Milutin Stojković	Milutin Stojković (born 1942)	1993	9 January 1997	3–4 years	SPS	1996
4	Živorad Smiljanić	Živorad Smiljanić (1942–2018)	9 January 1997	23 October 2000	3 years, 288 days	SPS	—
5	Nenad Čanak	Nenad Čanak (born 1959)	23 October 2000	30 October 2004	4 years, 7 days	LSV	2000
6	Bojan Kostreš	Bojan Kostreš (born 1974)	30 October 2004	16 July 2008	3 years, 260 days	LSV	2004
7	Sándor Egeresi	Sándor Egeresi (1964–2021)	16 July 2008	22 June 2012	3 years, 342 days	VMSZ	2008
8	István Pásztor	István Pásztor (1956–2023)	22 June 2012	30 October 2023 †	11 years, 130 days	VMSZ	2012; 2016; 2020
9	Momo Čolaković	Momo Čolaković (born 1940)	6 November 2023	25 April 2024	171 days	PUPS	—
10	Bálint Juhász	Bálint Juhász (born 1982)	25 April 2024	Incumbent	2 years, 135 days	VMSZ	2023

== See also ==
- President of the Government of Vojvodina
- President of the Presidency of SAP Vojvodina
- Lists of political office-holders in Vojvodina
