= Presidency of Yugoslavia =

Collective head of state of the Socialist Federal Republic of Yugoslavia

- Serbo-Croatian: Predsjedništvo SFRJ; Председништво СФРЈ; Slovene: Predsedstvo SFRJ; Macedonian: Председателство на СФРЈ
- Standard of a Member of the Presidency of Yugoslavia

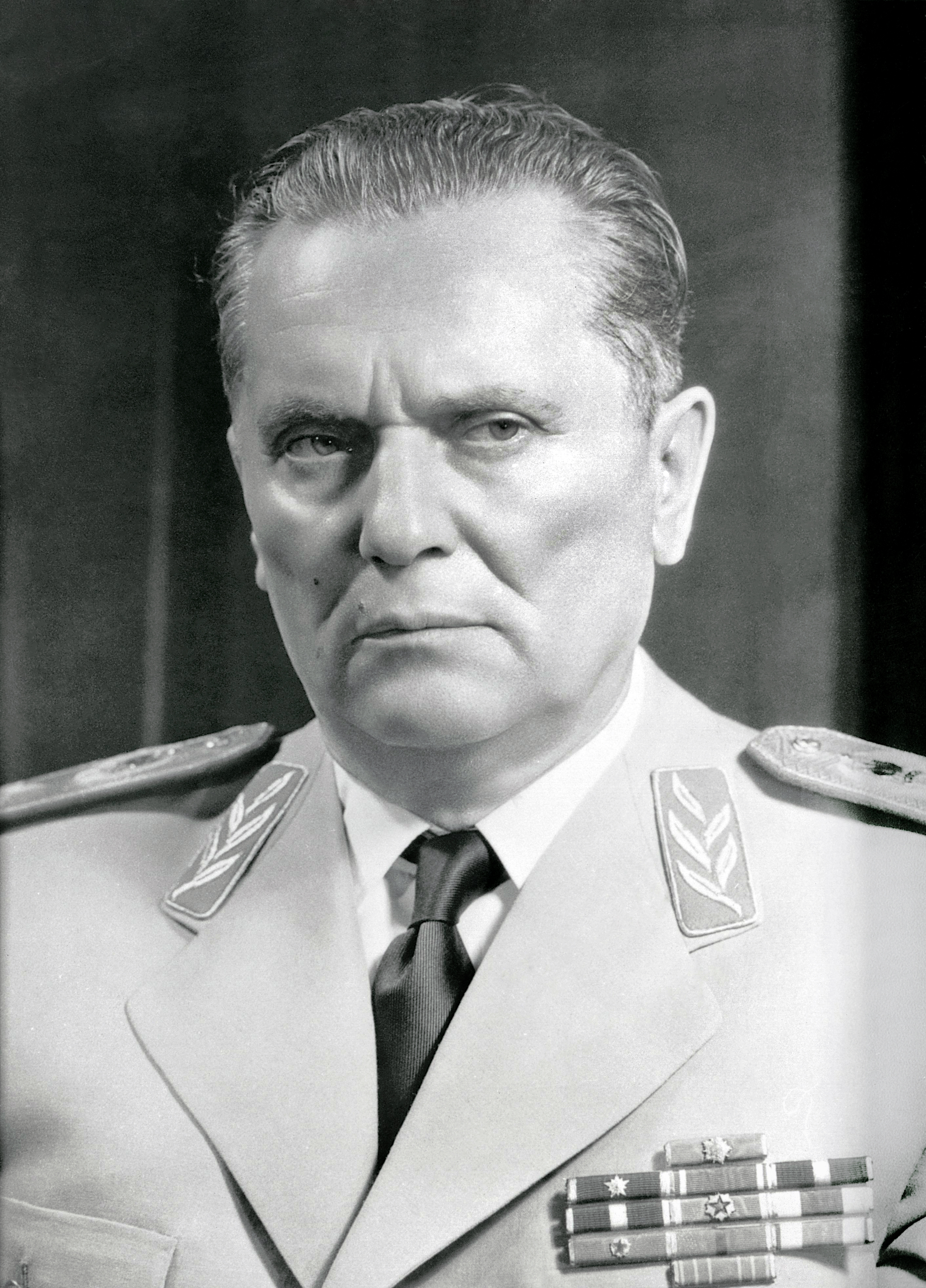
- Best known officeholder Josip Broz Tito; 30 June 1971 – 4 May 1980
- Term length: Five years, renewable once consecutively
- Precursor: Individual President of Yugoslavia
- Formation: 30 June 1971
- Abolished: 15 June 1992

The Presidency of the Socialist Federal Republic of Yugoslavia (Note: Serbo-Croatian Cyrillic: Председништво СФРЈ, romanized: Predsedništvo SFRJ, Predsjedništvo SFRJ, Slovene: Predsedstvo SFRJ, Macedonian: Председателство на СФРЈ, romanized: Predsedatelstvo na SFRJ) was the collective head of state of the Socialist Federal Republic of Yugoslavia. It was established in 1971 according to amendments to the 1963 Constitution and reorganized by the 1974 Constitution. Up to 1974, the Presidency had 23 members – three from each republic, two from each autonomous province and President Josip Broz Tito. In 1974 the presidency was reduced to 9 members – one from each republic and autonomous province and, until 1988, President of the League of Communists of Yugoslavia ex officio.

== Constitutional powers ==
According to the 1974 Constitution, the presidency had following powers:

- representing the federation both inside and outside the country
- commanding the Yugoslav People's Army, deciding on using the army both in war and in peace
- protecting equality of Yugoslav nationalities
- protecting the constitutional order
- proposing a candidate for the federal prime minister
- proposing candidates for the federal constitutional court
- appointing the ambassadors and generals and admirals
- appointing the National Defense Council and, if needed, also other agencies (one of such was Federal Council for Protection of the Constitutional Order)
- giving quarters and awarding state decorations

The presidency had eight members elected by assemblies of each republic and autonomous province and proclaimed by the Federal Assembly of the SFRY, the ninth member was the president of the Presidency of the League of Communists of Yugoslavia. This ex officio membership of the LCY leader was abolished by the constitutional changes in autumn 1988. The mandate of the presidency lasted five years so the nine-member Presidency was elected in total four times – in 1974, 1979, 1984 and 1989.

Until 1980 most of powers of the presidency (and control over the country in general) were in fact exercised by Josip Broz Tito, who, under Article 333 of the new constitution, was elected president of the republic for an unlimited mandate. After his death in May 1980, his office was automatically abolished and the presidency began to function according to the constitution.

Sometimes, the presidency held its sessions in an extended composition. Besides the members of the actual Presidency, in such sessions the following officials took part: chairman of the Federal Assembly, chairman and vice-chairman of the Federal Executive Council (the government), federal secretaries (ministers) of defense, interior and foreign affairs, chairman of the Federal Conference of the Socialist Alliance of Working People and chairmen of the presidencies of the Yugoslav republics and autonomous provinces. The extended Presidency was an advisory council not grounded in the Constitution and as such its decisions were legally non-binding.

== Post-Tito period ==
Tito, as the president of the republic, was ex officio president of the Presidency. After his death a new president of the presidency was elected every year. The order of rotating of the members on the leading position was agreed in advance, so this annual election was a pure formality. The rotating system jammed only in May 1991 –Stipe Mesić, representative of Franjo Tuđman's new Croatian government in the presidency, was about to become the president but was not elected due to opposition of a half of the presidency controlled by Serbian leader Slobodan Milošević. The top state office of the disintegrating federation remained vacant until 1 July when Mesić was finally elected.

Only one year after Tito's death, Yugoslav leaders had to face violent riots in Kosovo. On 2 April 1981 the presidency under president Cvijetin Mijatović declared a state of emergency in Priština and Kosovska Mitrovica, which lasted one week. The presidency declared a state of emergency again, that time on the whole territory of Kosovo, on 27 February 1989 under president Raif Dizdarević, when even more serious disorders in Kosovo broke out. For the third time in post-Tito Yugoslavia, a state of emergency in Kosovo was imposed by the presidency in February 1990.

The composition of the last Presidency elected in May 1989 reflected both approach of political pluralism in some parts of the federation and the beginning of agony in Yugoslavia:

- Janez Drnovšek from Slovenia and Bogić Bogićević from Bosnia and Herzegovina were elected in direct elections held in their republics
- representatives of Serbia, Montenegro, Kosovo and Vojvodina, i.e. half of the presidency, were acting under de facto control of Slobodan Milošević
- Stipe Šuvar, Croat representative of strongly pro-Yugoslav opinions, was in October 1990 replaced by Stipe Mesić nominated by Croatian government.

In summer 1991 Mesić and Drnovšek, regarding their republics independent, ceased to attend sessions of the presidency. They were followed by Bogićević and Vasil Tupurkovski from Macedonia, so that the presidency de facto ceased to exist, although the members from Serbia, its autonomous provinces (Kosovo and Vojvodina) and Montenegro continued to regard themselves as Yugoslav and so held sessions until 1992 when the Federal Republic of Yugoslavia was proclaimed, this time with an individual head of state elected by the federal assembly.

== Composition (1971–1992) ==
Presidency 1971–1974
Name	Term of chairmanship	Representing
Josip Broz Tito	30 June 1971 – 15 May 1974	President of the Republic, President of the League of Communists of Yugoslavia
Vidoje Žarković; Veljko Mićunović; Dobroslav Ćulafić		SR Montenegro
Josif Rajačić; Replaced by Sreten Kovačević; Maćaš Keleman; Replaced by Mrs. Ida Sabo		SAP Vojvodina
Ilaz Kurteshi; Veli Deva		SAP Kosovo
Nikola Minčev; Krste Crvenkovski; Kiro Gligorov; Replaced by Lazar Koliševski		SR Macedonia
Hamdija Pozderac; Ratomir Dugonjić; Augustin Papić		SR Bosnia and Herzegovina
Sergej Kraigher; Marko Bulc; Mitja Ribičič		SR Slovenia
Dragoslav Marković; Dobrivoje Vidić; Koča Popović; Replaced by Dragi Stamenković		SR Serbia
Jakov Blažević; Đuro Kladarin; Miko Tripalo; Replaced by Milan Mišković		SR Croatia
Presidency 1974–1979
Josip Broz Tito	15 May 1974 – 15 May 1979	President of the Republic, President of the League of Communists of Yugoslavia
Vidoje Žarković		SR Montenegro
Stevan Doronjski		SAP Vojvodina
Fadil Hoxha		SAP Kosovo
Lazar Koliševski		SR Macedonia
Cvijetin Mijatović		SR Bosnia and Herzegovina
Edvard Kardelj^{1} 1979 Sergej Kraigher		SR Slovenia
Petar Stambolić		SR Serbia
Vladimir Bakarić		SR Croatia
Presidency 1979–1984
Josip Broz Tito^{1}	15 May 1979 – 4 May 1980	President of the Republic, President of the League of Communists of Yugoslavia
Vidoje Žarković		SR Montenegro
Stevan Doronjski^{1} 1981 Radovan Vlajković		SAP Vojvodina
Fadil Hoxha		SAP Kosovo
Lazar Koliševski	4 May 1980 – 15 May 1980	SR Macedonia
Cvijetin Mijatović	15 May 1980 – 15 May 1981	SR Bosnia and Herzegovina
Sergej Kraigher	15 May 1981 – 15 May 1982	SR Slovenia
Petar Stambolić	15 May 1982 – 15 May 1983	SR Serbia
Vladimir Bakarić^{1} 1983 Mika Špiljak	15 May 1983 – 15 May 1984	SR Croatia
1980 Stevan Doronjski; 1980 Lazar Mojsov; 1981 Dušan Dragosavac; 1982 Mitja Ribičič; 1983 Dragoslav Marković		League of Communists of Yugoslavia
Presidency 1984–1989
Veselin Đuranović	15 May 1984 – 15 May 1985	SR Montenegro
Radovan Vlajković	15 May 1985 – 15 May 1986	SAP Vojvodina
Sinan Hasani	15 May 1986 – 15 May 1987	SAP Kosovo
Lazar Mojsov	15 May 1987 – 15 May 1988	SR Macedonia
Branko Mikulić^{2} 1986 Hamdija Pozderac^{3} 1987 Raif Dizdarević	15 May 1988 – 15 May 1989	SR Bosnia and Herzegovina
Stane Dolanc		SR Slovenia
Nikola Ljubičić		SR Serbia
Josip Vrhovec		SR Croatia
1984 Ali Shukri; 1985 Vidoje Žarković; 1986 Milanko Renovica; 1987 Boško Krunić; 1988 Stipe Šuvar (until November 1988)		League of Communists of Yugoslavia
Presidency 1989–1992
Dragutin Zelenović^{5} 1990 Jugoslav Kostić		SAP Vojvodina
Riza Sapunxhiu^{6} 1991 Sejdo Bajramović		SAP Kosovo
Vasil Tupurkovski		SR Macedonia / Republic of Macedonia
Bogić Bogićević		SR Bosnia and Herzegovina
Janez Drnovšek	15 May 1989 – 15 May 1990	SR Slovenia / Republic of Slovenia
Borisav Jović	15 May 1990 – 15 May 1991	SR Serbia / Republic of Serbia
Stipe Šuvar^{4} 1990 Stipe Mesić	1 July 1991 – 3 October 1991	SR Croatia / Republic of Croatia
Nenad Bućin^{7} 1991 Branko Kostić	6 December 1991 – 15 June 1992 (acting)	SR Montenegro

=== Notes ===
1. Died while holding the office
2. Resigned when he became Chairman of the Federal Executive Council
3. Resigned due to accusation of participation in the Agrokomerc scandal
4. Recalled by the Croatian Parliament
5. Recalled by the Serbian Parliament
6. Recalled by the Serbian Parliament
7. Recalled by the Montenegrin Parliament

== Members ==
- List of members of the Presidency of Yugoslavia

== See also ==
- List of heads of state of Yugoslavia
  - President of the Presidency of Yugoslavia
  - Vice President of the Presidency of Yugoslavia
- Prime Minister of Yugoslavia
- Presidency of Bosnia and Herzegovina
