= President of the Presidency of Yugoslavia =

High-ranking public office in Yugoslavia from 1980 to 1992

- Status: Abolished
- Member of: Presidency of Yugoslavia
- Term length: 1 year
- Precursor: President of Yugoslavia
- Formation: 4 May 1980
- First holder: Lazar Koliševski
- Final holder: Stjepan Mesić
- Abolished: 15 June 1992
- Superseded by: Presidency of Bosnia and Herzegovina; President of Croatia; President of Serbia and Montenegro; President of North Macedonia; President of Slovenia
- Deputy: Vice President of the Presidency

The office of the president of the Presidency of the Socialist Federal Republic of Yugoslavia (Note: Serbo-Croatian: Predsjednik Predsjedništva SFRJ / Председник Председништва СФРЈ, Macedonian: Претседател на Претседателството СФРЈ, romanized: Pretsedatel na Pretsedatelstvoto SFRJ, Slovene: Predsednik Predsedstva SFRJ) existed from the death of the President of the Republic Josip Broz Tito on 4 May 1980 until the dissolution of the country by 1992.

A collective presidency existed in Yugoslavia since amendments to the 1963 Constitution in 1971. In 1974 a new Constitution was adopted which reaffirmed the collective federal presidency consisting of representatives of the six republics, the two autonomous provinces within Serbia and (until 1988) the President of the League of Communists. The 1974 Constitution defined the office of President of the Presidency, but only coming into effect with the disestablishment of the office of President of the Republic. A separate article affirmed Josip Broz Tito with an unlimited mandate which ensured the new President of the Presidency would not come into effect until after his death. Simultaneously an office of Vice President of the Presidency had been in place since 1971 on a rotating annual basis between republican and provincial representatives. When Tito died on 4 May 1980, the then Vice President of the Presidency Lazar Koliševski acceded to the role of President of the Presidency. Subsequent to this the role of President of the Presidency would rotate on an annual basis with each President serving as Vice President the year prior.

== List of presidents ==
League of Communists of Yugoslavia Liberal Democracy of Slovenia Socialist Party of Serbia Croatian Democratic Union Democratic Party of Socialists of Montenegro Denotes an acting head of state

| No. | Portrait | Name (Birth–Death) | Representing | Term of office | | | Political party | Note |
| No. | Portrait | Name (Birth–Death) | Representing | Took office | Left office | Time in office | Political party | Note |
|---|---|---|---|---|---|---|---|---|
| 1 | Lazar Koliševski | Lazar Koliševski (1914–2000) | Macedonia | 4 May 1980 | 15 May 1980 | 11 days | SKJ | |
| 2 | Cvijetin Mijatović | Cvijetin Mijatović (1913–1993) | Bosnia and Herzegovina | 15 May 1980 | 15 May 1981 | 1 year, 0 days | SKJ | |
| 3 | Sergej Kraigher | Sergej Kraigher (1914–2001) | Slovenia | 15 May 1981 | 15 May 1982 | 1 year, 0 days | SKJ | |
| 4 | Petar Stambolić | Petar Stambolić (1912–2007) | Serbia | 15 May 1982 | 15 May 1983 | 1 year, 0 days | SKJ | |
| 5 | Mika Špiljak | Mika Špiljak (1916–2007) | Croatia | 15 May 1983 | 15 May 1984 | 1 year, 0 days | SKJ | |
| 6 | Veselin Đuranović | Veselin Đuranović (1925–1997) | Montenegro | 15 May 1984 | 15 May 1985 | 1 year, 0 days | SKJ | |
| 7 | Radovan Vlajković | Radovan Vlajković (1922–2001) | SAP Vojvodina | 15 May 1985 | 15 May 1986 | 1 year, 0 days | SKJ | |
| 8 | Sinan Hasani | Sinan Hasani (1922–2010) | SAP Kosovo | 15 May 1986 | 15 May 1987 | 1 year, 0 days | SKJ | |
| 9 | Lazar Mojsov | Lazar Mojsov (1920–2011) | Macedonia | 15 May 1987 | 15 May 1988 | 1 year, 0 days | SKJ | |
| 10 | Raif Dizdarević | Raif Dizdarević (1926–2026) | Bosnia and Herzegovina | 15 May 1988 | 15 May 1989 | 1 year, 0 days | SKJ | |
| 11 | Janez Drnovšek | Janez Drnovšek (1950–2008) | Slovenia | 15 May 1989 | 15 May 1990 | 1 year, 0 days | SKJ; LDS | Joined Liberal Democracy of Slovenia in February 1990. |
| 12 | Borisav Jović | Borisav Jović (1928–2021) | Serbia | 15 May 1990 | 15 May 1991 | 1 year, 0 days | SKJ; SPS | SKJ dissolved in 1990. In Serbia the party was succeeded by the SPS. |
| – | Sejdo Bajramović | Sejdo Bajramović (1927–1993); Acting | AP Kosovo | 16 May 1991 | 30 June 1991 | 45 days | SPS | Acting president. |
| 13 | Stjepan Mesić | Stjepan Mesić (born 1934) | Croatia | 30 June 1991 | 5 December 1991 | 158 days | HDZ | Last President of Yugoslavia. |
| – | Branko Kostić | Branko Kostić (1939–2020); Acting | Montenegro | 5 December 1991 | 15 June 1992 | 193 days | DPS | Acting president. Installed by Serbia and Montenegro. |

== See also ==
- List of heads of state of Yugoslavia
  - List of members of the Presidency of Yugoslavia
  - President of Yugoslavia
  - List of deputy heads of state of Yugoslavia
- Presidency of Bosnia and Herzegovina
  - Chairmen of the Presidency of Bosnia and Herzegovina
- President of Croatia
  - List of presidents of Croatia
  - President of the Presidency of SR Croatia
- President of Serbia and Montenegro
- President of Kosovo
- President of the Republic of Macedonia
- President of Montenegro
  - List of presidents of Montenegro
- President of Serbia
  - List of presidents of Serbia
  - President of the Presidency of SR Serbia
- President of Slovenia
- President of the Presidency of the Socialist Autonomous Province of Vojvodina
- President of the League of Communists of Yugoslavia
