= Momo Čolaković =

Serbian politician (born 1940)

- Момо Чолаковић

President of the Assembly of Vojvodina
- In office 6 November 2023 – 25 April 2024
- Preceded by: István Pásztor
- Succeeded by: Bálint Juhász

Personal details
- Born: 8 May 1940 (age 85) Ponikvice (Nikšić), Zeta Banovina, Kingdom of Yugoslavia
- Party: Party of United Pensioners of Serbia (2005–)
- Other political affiliations: League of Communists of Yugoslavia (1957–1990)

Momo Čolaković (Serbian Cyrillic: Момо Чолаковић; born 8 May 1940) is a politician in Serbia. He served in the National Assembly of Serbia from 2008 to 2020 and has been a member of the Assembly of Vojvodina since 2020. Čolaković is a member of the Party of United Pensioners of Serbia (PUPS).

== Early life and career ==
Čolaković was born in the village of Ponikvice, near Nikšić, which at the time was located in the Kingdom of Yugoslavia's Zeta Banovina but which was previously and subsequently part of Montenegro. His family moved to Vrbas in the Autonomous Province of Vojvodina, Serbia, when Yugoslavia was reconstructed in 1945. He graduated from the Economic and Commercial School in Novi Sad and became involved in the labour movement, serving with the union of the Vrbas municipality for twenty years. From 1990 to 1998, he was president of the Council of Independent Trade Unions of Yugoslavia. An economist by profession, he worked at the Vojvođanska banka from 1993 until his retirement in 2004. He now lives in Novi Sad.

Čolaković noted in 2018 that several members of his family had been deputies in the previous century, beginning with his great-grandfather Risto Čolaković, who was a member of the parliament of Montenegro prior to the establishment of the Kingdom of Serbs, Croats and Slovenes in 1918.

== Politician ==
Čolaković joined the League of Communists of Yugoslavia in 1957 and remained a party member until its disintegration in 1990. He was the president of the League of Independent Trade Unions of Yugoslavia in 1990. He sought election to the Assembly of the Federal Republic of Yugoslavia's Chamber of Citizens in the May 1992 Yugoslavian parliamentary election, running in Serbia as a candidate on the electoral list of the Yugoslavian Electoral Coalition (JIK). The list did not cross the electoral threshold to win any mandates. He was not affiliated with any party after this time until becoming a founding member of the PUPS in 2005.

The PUPS contested the 2007 Serbian parliamentary election in an alliance with the Social Democratic Party, and Čolaković received the third position on their combined list. This list, too, did not cross the electoral threshold.

=== Member of the National Assembly ===
The PUPS joined an electoral alliance led by the Socialist Party of Serbia for the 2008 parliamentary election. Čolaković was given the thirteenth position on the Socialist list and was chosen as part of the PUPS parliamentary delegation when the alliance won twenty mandates. (From 2000 to 2011, Serbian parliamentary mandates were awarded to sponsoring parties or coalitions rather than to individual candidates, and it was common practice for the mandates to be assigned out of numerical order. Čolaković did not automatically receive a mandate by virtue of his list position.) The results of the election were initially inconclusive, but the Socialists and their allies eventually formed a new coalition government with the For a European Serbia alliance. Čolaković led the PUPS assembly group in the parliament that followed.

Serbia's electoral system was reformed in 2011, such that parliamentary mandates were awarded in numerical order to candidates on successful lists. Čolaković was re-elected to the assembly in the elections of 2012 and 2014, in each case after receiving the eleventh position on the Socialist list (which won forty-four mandates each time). After the 2012 election, a new coalition government was formed by the Socialists, the Serbian Progressive Party, and other parties. The PUPS continued in government from 2012 to 2014 and provided parliamentary support to the government from 2014 to 2016.

The PUPS formed a new alliance with the Progressive Party for the 2016 Serbian parliamentary election. Čolaković received the seventy-fourth position on the Progressive list and was re-elected when it won a majority victory with 131 out of 250 mandates. During the 2016–20 assembly, he was member of the committee on finance, state budget, and control of public spending; a member of the committee on administrative, budgetary, mandate, and community issues; a deputy member of the European integration committee and the committee on the economy, regional development, trade, tourism, and energy; the head of Serbia's delegation to the Parliamentary Assembly of the Mediterranean; and a member of the parliamentary friendship groups with Azerbaijan, Belarus, Bosnia and Herzegovina, Croatia, Cuba, Kazakhstan, Montenegro, and Russia.

Čolaković stated in 2019 that he opposed the legal recognition of same-sex marriage. He also said that he was in favour of compulsory military service.

=== Member of the Assembly of Vojvodina ===
Čolaković did not seek re-election to the national assembly in 2020. He instead received the twenty-fourth position on the Progressive-led electoral list for the Vojvodina assembly in the that year's provincial election and was elected when the list won a majority victory with seventy-six out of 120 mandates. He is now a member of the provincial assembly's committee on economy and its committee on budget and finance.

Political offices
Preceded by István Pásztor	President of the Assembly of Vojvodina; 2023–2024	Succeeded by Bálint Juhász
