= Sándor Egeresi =

Serbian politician (1964–2021)

Sándor Egeresi Šandor Egereši
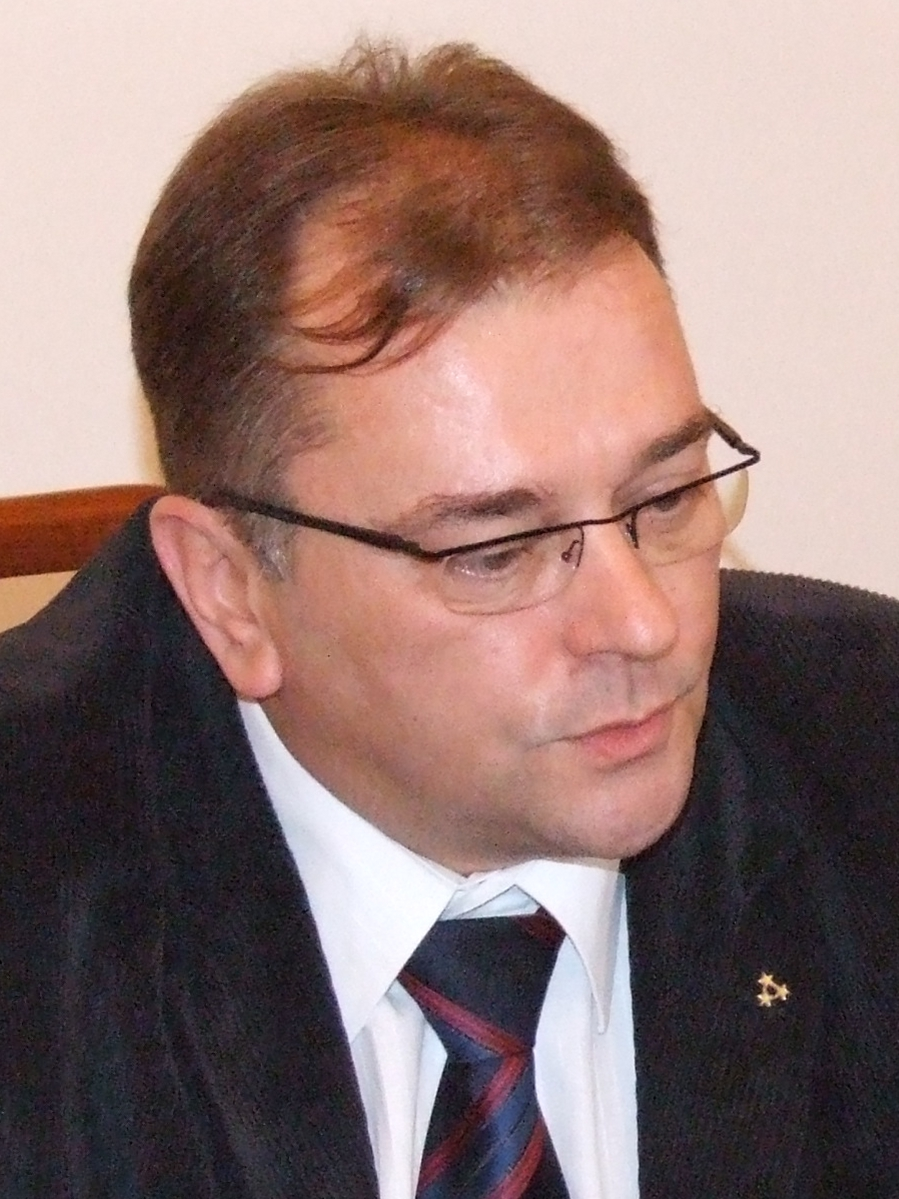

President of the Assembly of Vojvodina
- In office 16 July 2008 – 22 June 2012
- Preceded by: Bojan Kostreš
- Succeeded by: István Pásztor

Personal details
- Born: 25 June 1964 Bačka Topola, Vojvodina, Serbia, Yugoslavia
- Died: 5 September 2021 (aged 57)
- Citizenship: Serbia
- Party: Alliance of Vojvodina Hungarians

Sándor Egeresi (Hungarian pronunciation: [ˈʃaːndor ˈɛɡɛrɛʃi]; Serbian: Шандор Егереши, romanized: Šandor Egereši; 25 June 1964 – 5 September 2021) was an ethnic Hungarian politician from Serbia.

== Biography ==
Egeresi was born in Bačka Topola, SAP Vojvodina, SFR Yugoslavia. He finished elementary and secondary school in Bačka Topola after which he graduated from the School of Law. During the early 1990s, he was an active participant and organizer of peace movements in Vojvodina (peace concert in Bačka Topola, organization of anti-war petition, parliamentary activities).

He served as President of the Assembly of the Autonomous Province of Vojvodina from 2008 to 2012. He was elected President at the constitutive session held on 16 July 2008. He was a member of the Alliance of Vojvodina Hungarians.

He has been a member of the Alliance of Vojvodina Hungarians since its establishment. During several terms of office, he performed various functions as the party official (the Vice-President, member of the Presidency, member of the Council, President of the Council and President of municipal organization of the Alliance of Vojvodina Hungarians (SVM) in Bačka Topola).
