= Verona Ádám Bokros =

Serbian politician (born 1948)

Verona Ádám Bokros (Hungarian pronunciation: [ˈvɛronɒ ˈaːdaːm ˈbokroʃ]; Serbian: Верона Адам Бокрош, Verona Adam Bokroš, born 1948 in Ada, SAP Vojvodina, SFR Yugoslavia) is a Serbian politician of Hungarian descent. She graduated from the University of Belgrade's Law School in 1971 and has passed her judicial exam in 1985. Justice Adam Bokros worked on commercial, health and misdemeanor law issues. From 1989 to 1991 she was the President of the Assembly of Vojvodina. In May 1991, she was elected Justice of the Constitutional Court of Serbia. She is a member of the Socialist Party of Serbia.
