= Bálint Juhász =

Serbian politician (born 1982)

- Балинт Јухас

President of the Assembly of Vojvodina
- Incumbent
- Assumed office 25 April 2024
- Preceded by: Momo Čolaković

Personal details
- Born: 7 November 1982 (age 43) Subotica, SAP Vojvodina, SR Serbia, SFR Yugoslavia
- Citizenship: Serbian
- Party: Alliance of Vojvodina Hungarians (2006–)
- Children: 3
- Education: University of Novi Sad

Bálint Juhász (Hungarian pronunciation: [ˈbaːlint ˈjuhaːs]; Serbian: Балинт Јухас, Balint Juhas; born 7 November 1982) is a Serbian politician who serves as the president of the Assembly of Vojvodina since 25 April 2024. An ethnic Hungarian, he is a member of the Alliance of Vojvodina Hungarians.

== Biography ==
He was born on 7 November 1982, into an ethnic Hungarian family in Subotica (then part of SAP Vojvodina within SFR Yugoslavia). He completed his undergraduate and master's studies at the Faculty of Economics in Subotica. He has been a member of the Alliance of Vojvodina Hungarians since 2006. He is married and has three children.

Political offices
Preceded by Momo Čolaković	President of the Assembly of Vojvodina; 2024–present	Incumbent
