= Vojvodina =

Province of Serbia

Vojvodina Војводина
- Autonomous province
- Autonomous Province of Vojvodina; Аутономна покрајина Војводина (Serbian); Vajdaság Autonóm Tartomány (Hungarian); Autonómna pokrajina Vojvodina (Slovak); Provincia Autonomă Voivodina (Romanian); Autonomna pokrajina Vojvodina (Croatian); Автономна покраїна Войводина (Rusyn)
Official
Traditional
Flag
Official
Traditional
Coat of arms
- Location of Vojvodina in Serbia
- Coordinates: 45.416°N 20.198°E
- Country: Serbia
- Formation of Serbian Vojvodina: 1848
- Unification with Kingdom of Serbia: 1918
- Socialist Autonomous Province: 1944
- Autonomous Province: 1990
- Administrative center: Novi Sad

Government
  - Type: Autonomous province within a unitary state
  - President of the Government: Maja Gojković (SNS)
  - President of the Assembly: Bálint Juhász (SVM)

Area
  - Total: 21,614 km^{2} (8,345 sq mi)

Population (2022)
  - Total: ▼1,740,230
  - Estimate (2025): ▼1,716,238
  - Density: 81/km^{2} (210/sq mi)

Languages
  - Official languages: Serbian; Hungarian; Slovak; Romanian; Croatian; Pannonian Rusyn

GDP
  - Total: $20.1 billion (2024)
  - Per capita: $11,613 (2024)
- Time zone: UTC+1 (CET)
  - Summer (DST): UTC+2 (CEST)
- ISO 3166 code: RS-VO
- HDI (2022): 0.799 high · 2nd in Serbia
- Website: vojvodina.gov.rs

Vojvodina (/ˌvɔɪvəˈdiːnə/ VOY-və-DEE-nə; Serbian: Војводина, IPA: [vǒjvodina]), officially the Autonomous Province of Vojvodina (Serbian: Аутономна покрајина Војводина, romanized: Autonomna pokrajina Vojvodina), is an autonomous province in northern Serbia. It encompasses the historical regions of Bačka, Banat, Syrmia, and northernmost part of Mačva, lying to the north of the national capital Belgrade and the Sava and Danube rivers. Vojvodina has 1.7 million inhabitants, about a quarter of the country's population, and its administrative centre, Novi Sad, is the second largest city in Serbia.

== Etymology ==
Vojvodina is the Serbian word for voivodeship, a type of duchy overseen by a voivode. Its original historical name was Serbian Vojvodina ("Serbian Voivodeship"), a short-lived self-proclaimed autonomous province within the Austrian Empire. The Serbian Voivodeship, a precursor to modern Vojvodina, was an Austrian province from 1849 to 1860. The Serbian language uses two more varieties of the word vojvodina. These varieties are vojvodovina (војводовина), and vojvodstvo (војводство), the latter being an equivalent to the Polish word for province, województwo (voivodeship).

The official name, the Autonomous Province of Vojvodina, in the province's six official languages is:

- Serbian: Аутономна Покрајина Војводина
- Hungarian: Vajdaság Autonóm Tartomány
- Slovak: Autonómna pokrajina Vojvodina
- Romanian: Provincia Autonomă Voivodina
- Croatian: Autonomna Pokrajina Vojvodina
- Pannonian Rusyn: Автономна Покраїна Войводина

== History ==
=== Prehistory and antiquity ===
In the Neolithic period, two important archaeological cultures flourished in this area: the Starčevo culture and the Vinča culture. Indo-European peoples first settled in the territory of present-day Vojvodina in 3200 BC. During the Eneolithic period, the Bronze Age and the Iron Age, several Indo-European archaeological cultures were centered in or around Vojvodina, including the Vučedol culture, the Vatin culture, and the Bosut culture, among others.

Before the Roman conquest in the 1st century BC, Indo-European peoples of Illyrian, Thracian, and Celtic origin inhabited this area. The first states organized in this area were the Celtic State of the Scordisci (3rd century BC-1st century AD) with capital in Singidunum (modern-day Belgrade), and the Dacian Kingdom of Burebista (1st century BC).

During Roman rule, Sirmium (modern-day Sremska Mitrovica) was one of the four capital cities of the Roman Empire, and six Roman Emperors were born in this city or in its surroundings. The city was also the capital of several Roman administrative units, including Pannonia Inferior, Pannonia Secunda, the Diocese of Pannonia, and the Praetorian prefecture of Illyricum.

Roman rule lasted until the 5th century, after which the region came into the possession of various peoples and states. While Banat was a part of the Roman province of Dacia, Syrmia belonged to the Roman province of Pannonia. Bačka was not part of the Roman Empire and was populated and ruled by Sarmatian Iazyges.

=== Early Middle Ages ===
After the Romans were driven away from this region, various Indo-European and Turkic peoples and states ruled in the area. These peoples included Goths, Sarmatians, Huns, Gepids, and Avars. For regional history, the largest in importance was a Gepid state, which had its capital in Sirmium. According to the 7th-century Miracles of Saint Demetrius, Avars gave the region of Syrmia to a Bulgar leader named Kuber circa 680. The Bulgars of Kuber moved south with Maurus to Macedonia where they co-operated with Tervel in the 8th century. Slavs settled today's Vojvodina in the 6th and 7th centuries, shortly before some of them crossed the rivers Sava and Danube and settled in the Balkans. Slavic tribes that lived in the territory of present-day Vojvodina included Obotrites, Severians, Braničevci, and Timočani.

In the 9th century, after the fall of the Avar state, the first forms of Slavic statehood emerged in this area. The first Slavic states that ruled over this region included the Bulgarian Empire, Great Moravia and Ljudevit's Pannonian Duchy. During the Bulgarian administration (9th century), local Bulgarian dukes, Salan and Glad, ruled over the region. Salan's residence was Titel, while that of Glad was possibly in the rumoured rampart of Galad or perhaps in the modern-day Kladovo (Gladovo) in eastern Serbia. Glad's descendant was the duke Ajtony, another local ruler from the 11th century who opposed the establishment of Hungarian rule over the region.

In the village of Čelarevo archaeologists have also found graves of people who practised Judaism, containing skulls with Mongolian features (possibly Avars or Bulgars, while some attribute them to the Kabars) and Judaic symbols, to the late 8th and 9th centuries.

=== Hungarian rule ===
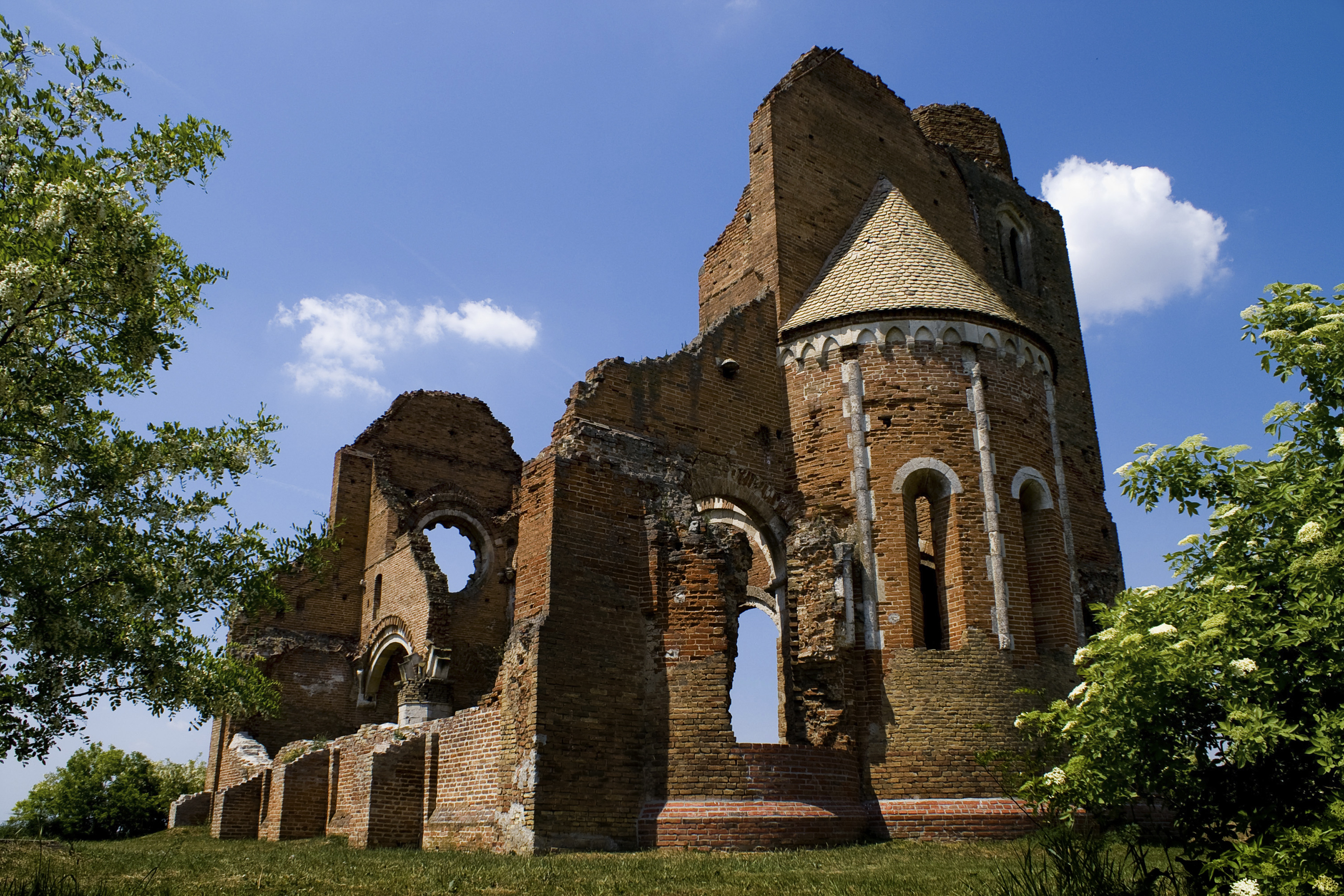
Ruins of Arača church

Following territorial disputes with Byzantine and Bulgarian states, Vojvodina was part of the Principality of Hungary and Kingdom of Hungary from the 10th century and remained under Hungarian administration until the 16th century.

The regional demographic balance started changing in the 11th century when Hungarians began to replace the local Slavic population. But from the 14th century, the balance changed again in favour of the Slavs when Serb refugees fleeing from territories conquered by the Ottoman army settled in the area. Most of the Hungarians left the region during the Ottoman conquest and early period of Ottoman administration, so the population of Vojvodina in Ottoman times was predominantly Serb, with a significant presence of Muslims of various ethnic backgrounds.

=== Ottoman rule ===
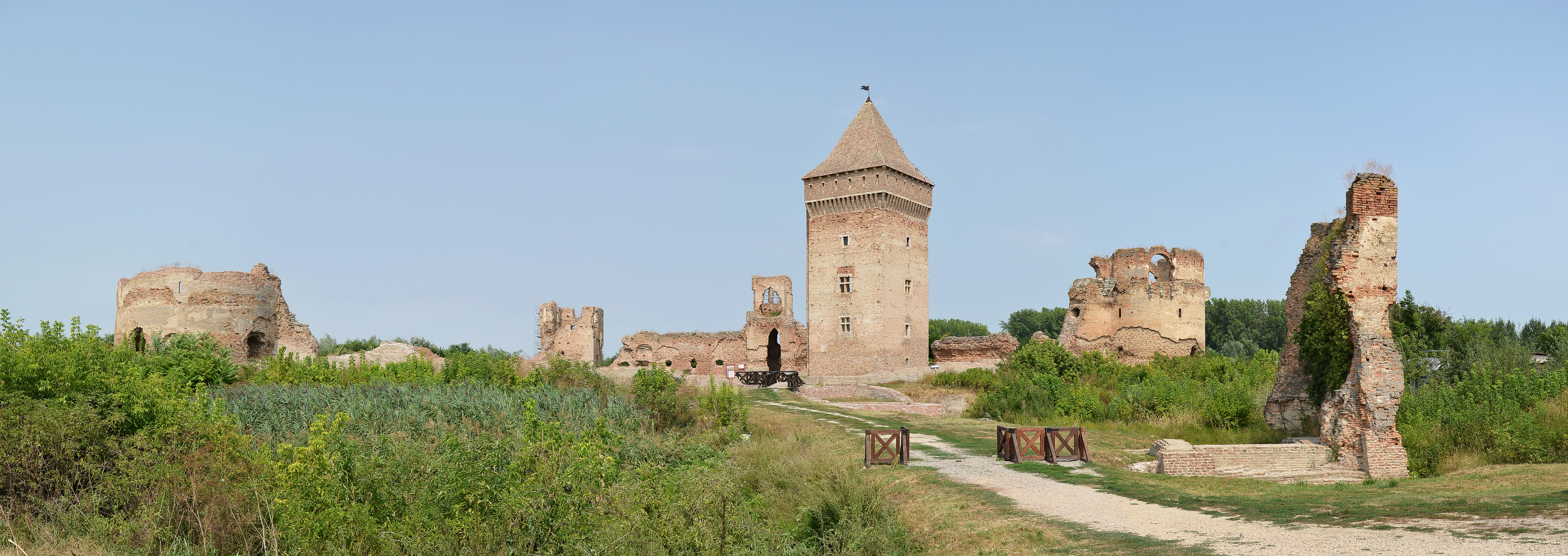
Bač Fortress

Following the defeat of the Kingdom of Hungary at Mohács by the Ottoman Empire, the region fell into a period of anarchy and civil wars. In 1526, Jovan Nenad, a leader of Serb mercenaries, established his rule in Bačka, northern Banat, and a small part of Syrmia. He created an ephemeral independent state, with Subotica as its capital.

At the peak of his power, Jovan Nenad proclaimed himself Serbian Emperor. Taking advantage of the extremely confused military and political situation, the Hungarian noblemen from the region joined forces against him and defeated the Serbian troops in 1527. Jovan Nenad was assassinated, and his state collapsed. After the fall of his state, the supreme military commander of Jovan Nenad's army, Radoslav Čelnik, established his own temporary state in the region of Syrmia, where he ruled as an Ottoman vassal.

A few decades later, the entire region was incorporated into the Ottoman Empire, which ruled over it until the end of the 17th and the first half of the 18th century, when it was incorporated into the Habsburg monarchy. The Treaty of Karlowitz of 1699, between the Holy League and Ottoman Empire, marked the withdrawal of the Ottoman forces from Central Europe and the supremacy of the Habsburg monarchy in that part of the European continent. According to the treaty, the western part of Vojvodina passed to the Habsburgs while the eastern part (eastern Syrmia and Temeşvar Eyalet) remained in Ottoman hands until the Austrian conquest in 1716. This new border change was ratified by the Treaty of Passarowitz in 1718.

=== Habsburg rule ===
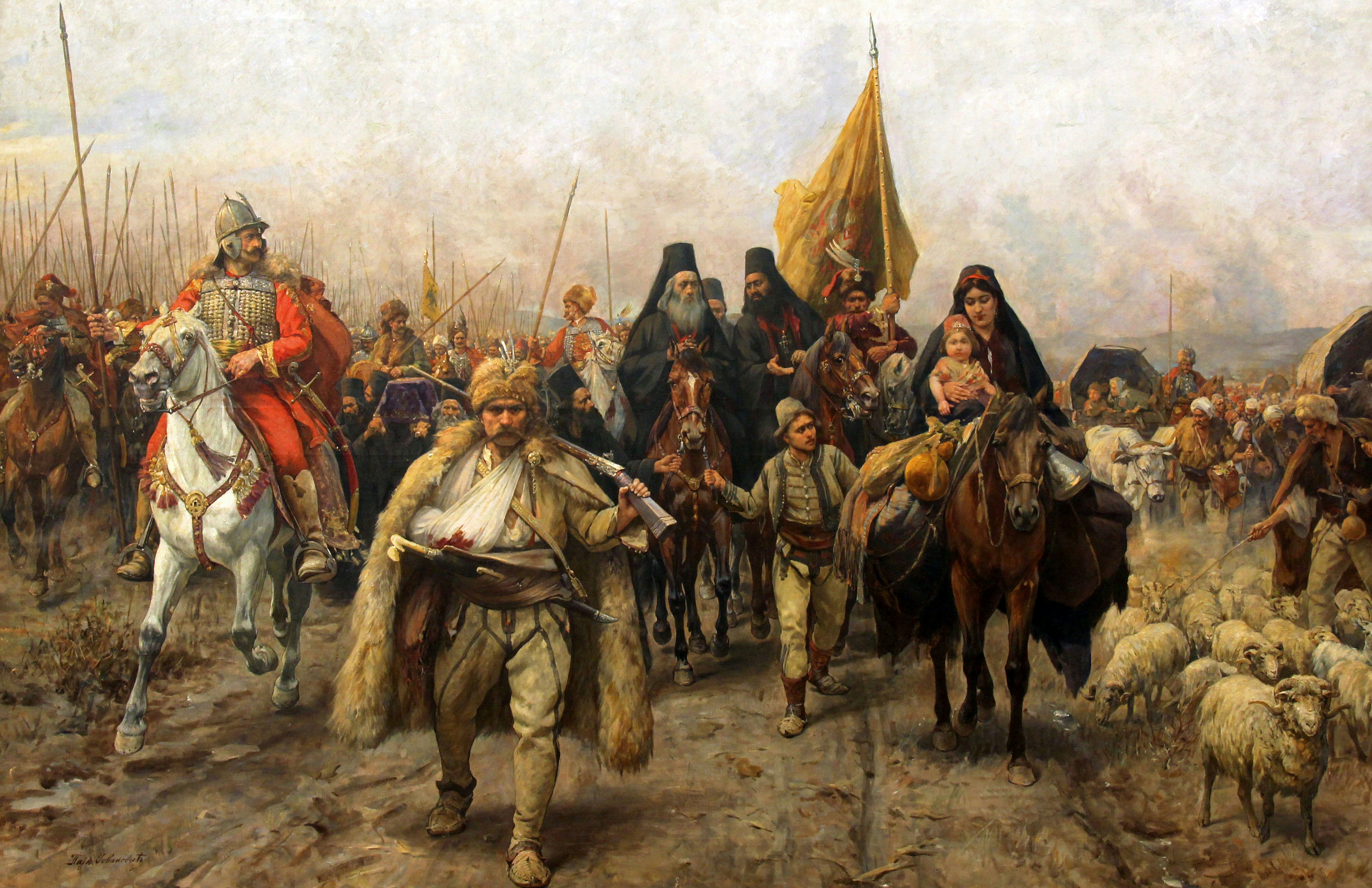
Great Migration of the Serbs from Ottoman territories to the Habsburg monarchy at the end of the 17th century; Migration of the Serbs, 1896 painting by Paja Jovanović

During the Great Migrations of the Serbs, Serbs from Ottoman territories settled in the Habsburg monarchy at the end of the 17th century. Most settled in what is now Hungary, with the rest settling in present-day Serbian part of Bačka. All Serbs in the Habsburg monarchy gained the status of a recognized nation with extensive rights, in exchange for providing a border militia (in the Military Frontier) that could be mobilized against Ottoman invaders from the south, as well as in case of civil unrest in the Habsburg Kingdom of Hungary. Wallachian Rights became the point of reference in the 18th century for military settlement in lowland region. The Vlachs who settled there were actually mainly Serbs, although there were also Romanians, while Aromanians lived in the urban areas.

At the beginning of Habsburg rule, most of the region was integrated into the Military Frontier, while the western parts of Bačka were put under civil administration within the County of Bač. Later, the civil administration was expanded to other (mostly northern) parts of the region, while southern parts remained under military administration. The eastern part of this area was held again by the Ottoman Empire between 1787 and 1788, during the Russo-Turkish War. In 1716, Vienna temporarily forbade settlement by Hungarians and Jews in the area, while large numbers of Germans were settled in the region from Swabia and Bavaria, to repopulate it and develop agriculture. From 1782, Protestant Hungarians and Germans started settling in larger numbers.

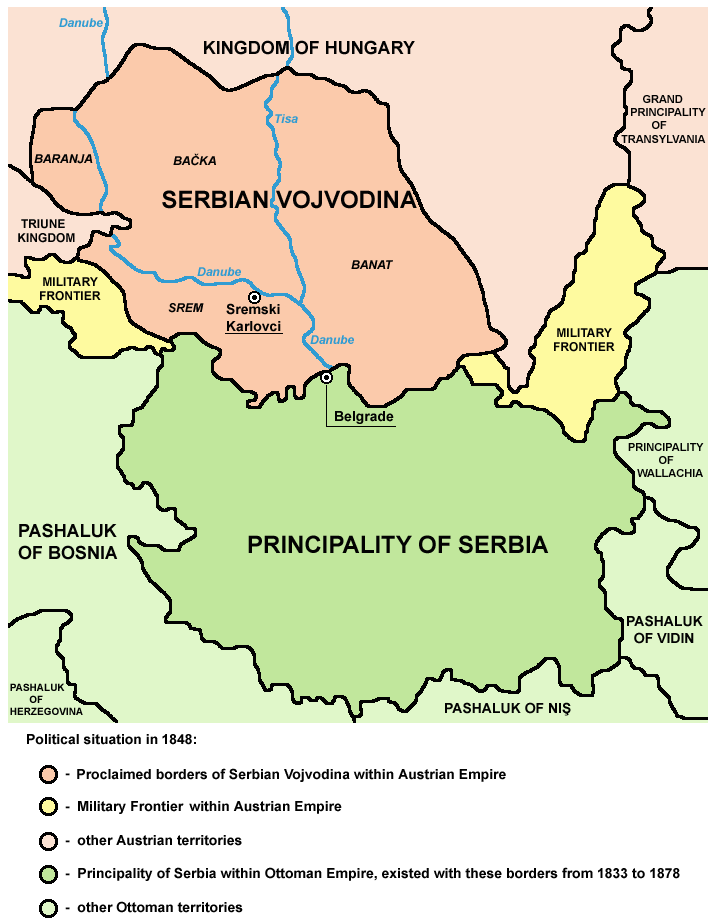
Proclaimed borders of Serbian Vojvodina, 1848

During the 1848–49 revolutions, Vojvodina was a site of a war between Serbs and Hungarians, due to the opposite national conceptions of the two peoples. At the May Assembly in Sremski Karlovci in May 1848, Serbs declared the constitution of the Serbian Vojvodina (Serbian Duchy), a Serbian autonomous region within the Austrian Empire. The Serbian Vojvodina consisted of Syrmia, Bačka, Banat, and Baranya. The head of the metropolitanate of Sremski Karlovci, Josif Rajačić, was elected patriarch, while Stevan Šupljikac was chosen as first voivod (duke). The ethnic war erupted violently in the area, with both sides committing atrocities against the civilian populations.

Following the Habsburg-Russian and Serb victory over the Hungarians in 1849, a new administrative territory was created in the region, in accordance with a decision made by the Emperor of Austria. By this decision, the Serbian autonomous region created in 1848 was transformed into the new Austrian crown land known as Voivodeship of Serbia and Banat of Temeschwar. It consisted of Banat, Bačka, and Syrmia, excluding the southern parts of these regions, which were part of the Military Frontier with significant Serbian populations. An Austrian governor seated in Temeschwar ruled the area, while the title of Voivod belonged to the emperor himself. The full title of the emperor was "Grand Voivod of the Voivodship of Serbia". German and Serbian were the official languages of the crown land.

=== Hungarian rule ===
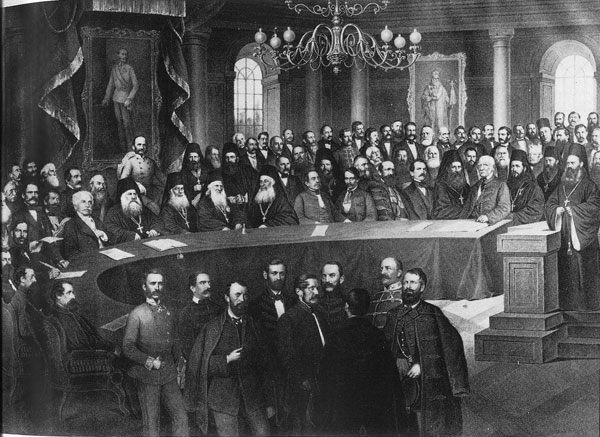
The Annunciation Council in Sremski Karlovci, 1861

Vojvodina remained Austrian Crown land until 1860, when Emperor Franz Joseph decided that it would be Hungarian Crown land again. After 1867, the Kingdom of Hungary became one of two self-governing parts of Austria-Hungary, and the territory was returned again to Hungarian administration.

In 1867, a new county system was introduced. This territory was organized among Bács-Bodrog, Torontál, and Temes counties. The era following the Austro-Hungarian Compromise of 1867 was a period of economic flourishing, and the Lands of the Crown of Saint Stephen had the second-fastest growing economy in Europe between 1867 and 1913, but ethnic relations were strained. According to the 1910 census, the last census conducted in Austria-Hungary, the population of Vojvodina consisted of 34% Serbs, 28% Hungarians, and 21% Germans.

By the end of the 19th century, on the territory of present-day Vojvodina there were up to 800 Serbian Orthodox churches, 28 monasteries, and a theological college.

=== Kingdom of Yugoslavia ===
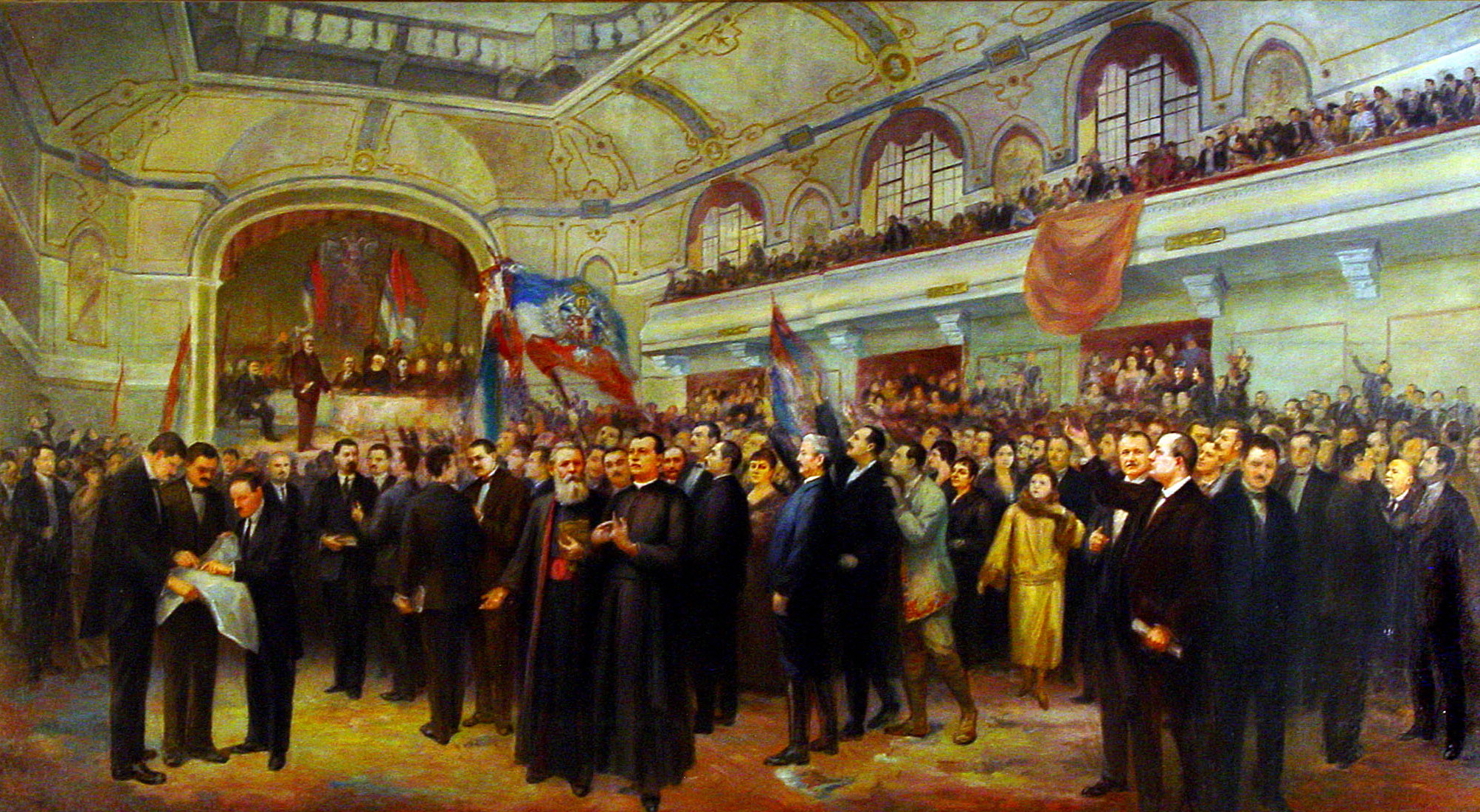
Great National Assembly in Novi Sad, 1918

At the end of World War I, Austria-Hungary collapsed. On 31 October 1918, the Banat Republic was proclaimed in Timișoara. The government of Hungary recognized its independence, but it was short-lived. On 24 November 1918, the Assembly of Syrmia proclaimed the unification of Syrmia with Serbia. The following day, the Great People's Assembly of Serbs, Bunjevci and other Slavs in Banat, Bačka and Baranja in Novi Sad also proclaimed the unification of Banat, Bačka and Baranja with the Kingdom of Serbia. The assembly numbered 757 deputies, of which 578 were Serbs, 84 Bunjevci, 62 Slovaks, 21 Rusyns, 6 Germans, 3 Šokci, 2 Croats, and 1 Hungarian. On 1 December 1918, Vojvodina, as part of the Kingdom of Serbia, became part of the Kingdom of Serbs, Croats and Slovenes.

Between 1929 and 1941, the region was part of the Danube Banovina, a province of the Kingdom of Yugoslavia, with administrative center in Novi Sad. Apart from the core territories of Vojvodina and Baranya, it included significant parts of Šumadija and Braničevo regions south of the Danube, but not the capital city of Belgrade itself.

=== World War II ===
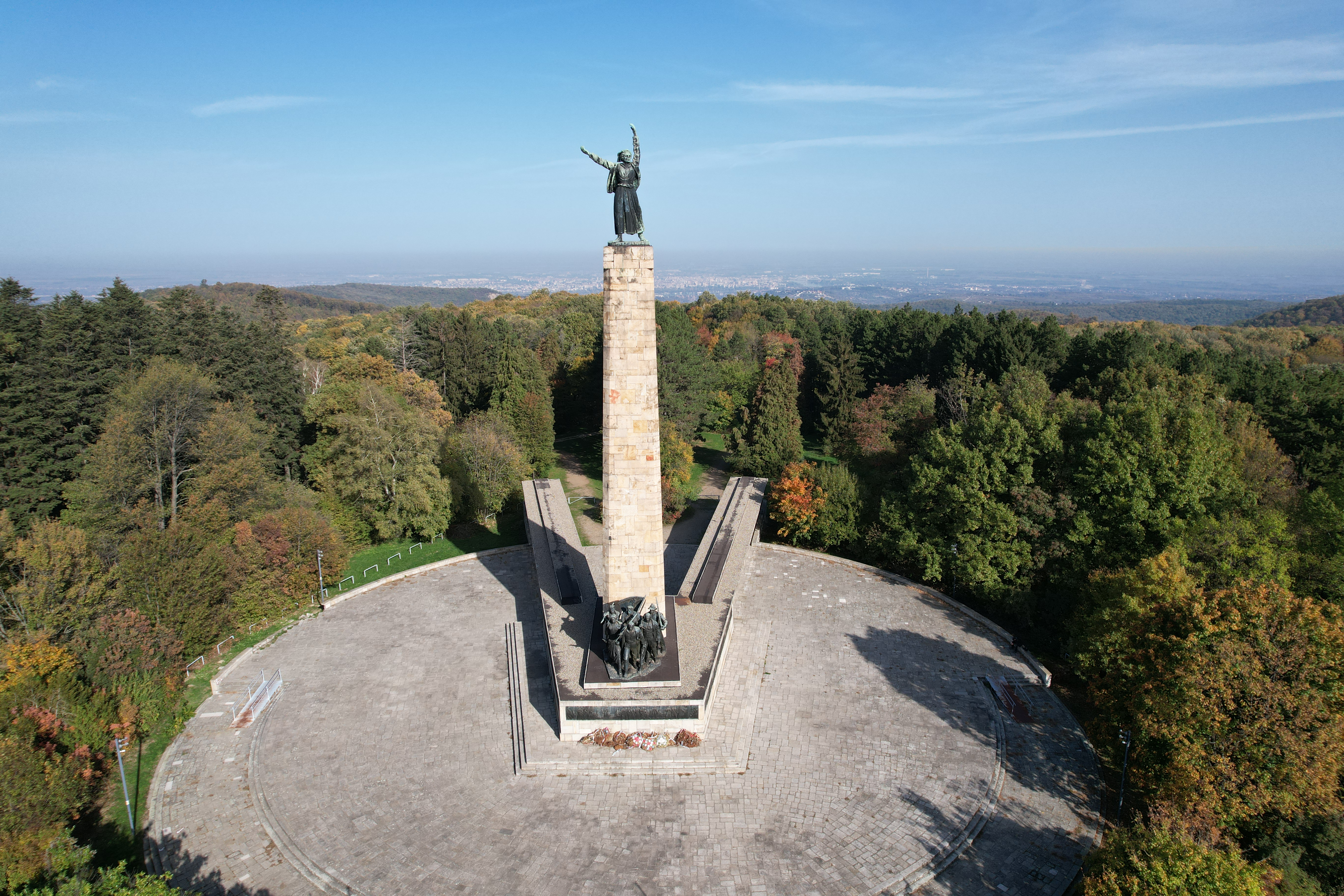
"The Monument to Freedom" in Fruška Gora, dedicated to the Yugoslav Partisans' resistance in occupied Vojvodina

During World War II, Nazi Germany and its allies, Hungary and the Independent State of Croatia, occupied Vojvodina and divided it among themselves. Bačka and Baranya were annexed by Hungary while Syrmia was included in the Independent State of Croatia. The rest of former Danube Banovina (including Banat, Šumadija, and Braničevo) was designated as part of the area governed by the German Military Administration in Serbia. The administrative center of this smaller province was Smederevo.

The occupying powers committed numerous atrocities against the civilian population; the Jewish population of Vojvodina was almost completely killed or deported. In total, Axis occupational authorities killed about 50,000 people in Vojvodina (mostly Serbs, Jews, and Roma) while more than 280,000 people were interned, arrested, or tortured. In 1942, in the Novi Sad Raid, a military operation carried out by the Royal Hungarian Army, resulted in the deaths of 3,000–4,000 civilians. Under the Hungarian authority, 19,573 people were killed in Bačka, of which the majority of victims were of Serbs, Jews, and Roma.

During the war, Yugoslav Partisans established a strong presence in Fruška Gora and fought against the division of Vojvodina between the occupying forces, advocating for the post-war multicultural autonomous Vojvodina within socialist Yugoslavia.

In 1944, vast majority of ethnic Germans (about 200,000) fled the region, together with the retreating German army. Those ethnic Germans who remained in the region (about 150,000) were sent to some of the villages cordoned off as prisons or camps where 8,049 people died from disease, hunger, malnutrition, mistreatment, and cold. It has also been estimated that post-war Yugoslav communist authorities killed some 15,000–20,000 Hungarians. In addition to that, 23,000–24,000 Serbs were killed as well, during post-war communist purges.

=== Socialist Yugoslavia ===
The region was politically restored in 1944 (incorporating Syrmia, Banat, Bačka, and Baranya) and became an autonomous province of Serbia in 1945. Instead of the previous name (Danube Banovina), the region regained its historical name of Vojvodina, while its administrative center remained Novi Sad. When the final borders of Vojvodina were defined, Baranya was assigned to Croatia, while the northern part of the Mačva region was assigned to Vojvodina.

Up until the 1970s, the province enjoyed a limited level of autonomy within the Socialist Republic of Serbia. Under the 1974 Yugoslav constitution, it gained extensive rights of self-rule, as both Kosovo and Vojvodina were given de facto veto power as changes to their status could not be made without the consent of the provincial assemblies. It represented the peak of the decentralization within Serbia while the late 1980s anti-bureaucratic revolution, initiated by Slobodan Milošević, made the sharp turn in the direction of the renewed centralization embodied in numerous constitutional amendments reaffirming and strengthening the link of the province with Serbia. The motivation for the change was the widespread perception among the Serbian political elite that such high level of provincial autonomy put Serbia in unequal position compared to other Yugoslav constituent republics. Following the 1990 Serbian constitutional referendum, Serbia adopted a new constitution which led to the promulgation of the new provincial statute in 1991, which stripped provincial bodies of any original or delegated powers and competencies.

=== Breakup of Yugoslavia ===
During the 1990s, Vojvodina underwent significant social changes amid the broader context of the dissolution of Yugoslavia and subsequent Yugoslav Wars.

Although Vojvodina was spared direct armed conflict, it felt the indirect effects as large influxes of Serb refugees from Croatia and Bosnia and Herzegovina, settled in Vojvodina (primarily Syrmia and southern Bačka) significantly altering the demographic and social makeup of the province. At the same time, significant number of ethnic minorities, primarily Croats and Hungarians, emigrated. Hungarians emigrated to Hungary due to economic and political challenges, including disproportionate conscription into the Yugoslav People's Army during the Croatian War of Independence, prompting many young Hungarians to emigrate to Hungary to avoid being drafted. The persecution of Croats in 1991 and 1992, resulted in more than 10,000 Croats leaving the province for Croatia, exchanging their property for the property of Serb refugees from Croatia. All these migrations altered the ethnic composition of the province, with the share of Serb population increasing from 57% in 1991 to 65% by 2002, and share of ethnic minorities falling correspondingly.

=== Contemporary period ===
Following the overthrow of Slobodan Milošević in 2000, Vojvodina’s autonomy was partially restored, although the scope of autonomy remains fairly limited.

In the last two decades, regional economy grew considerably solidifying its role as Serbia’s economic engine, driven traditionally by agriculture, but also from industrial diversification and a growing IT industry, with corresponding big foreign investments made by major multinational companies.

== Geography ==
Vojvodina is situated in the southeast part of the Pannonian Basin, the plain that remained when the Pliocene Pannonian Sea dried out. As a consequence of this, Vojvodina is rich in fertile loamy loess soil, covered with a layer of chernozem. The region is divided by the Danube and Tisza rivers into: Bačka in the northwest, Banat in the east, and Syrmia in the southwest. A small part of the Mačva region is also located in Vojvodina south of the Sava river.

The relief is mostly flat with two exceptions: Fruška Gora in northern Syrmia, and Vršac Mountains in southeastern Banat, with its Gudurički Vrh, the highest peak in Vojvodina, at an altitude of 641 meters above sea level.

The climate of the area is moderate continental, including cold winters and hot and humid summers. It is, however, characterized by a very irregular rainfall distribution per month.

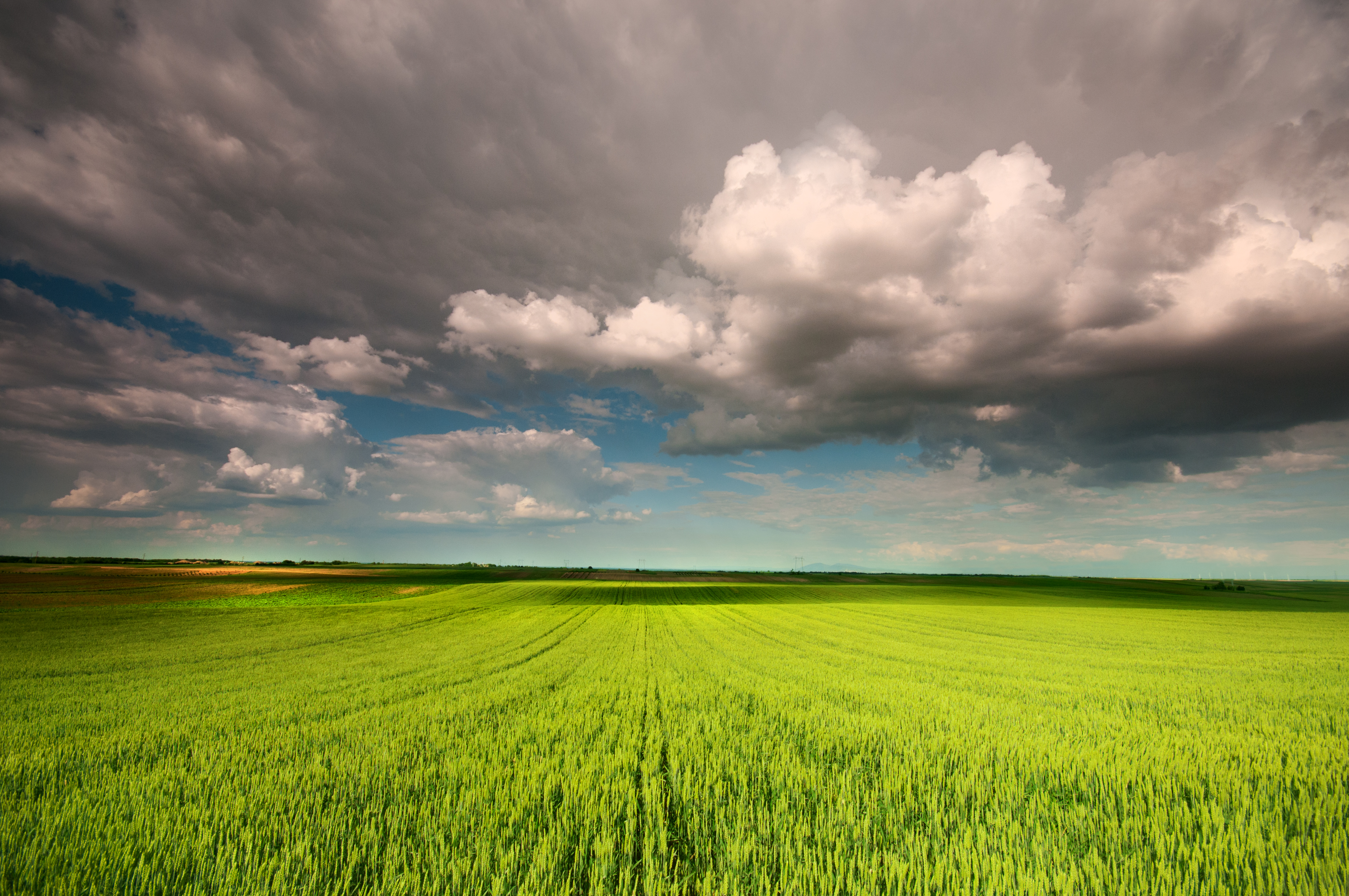
Wheat field in Banat

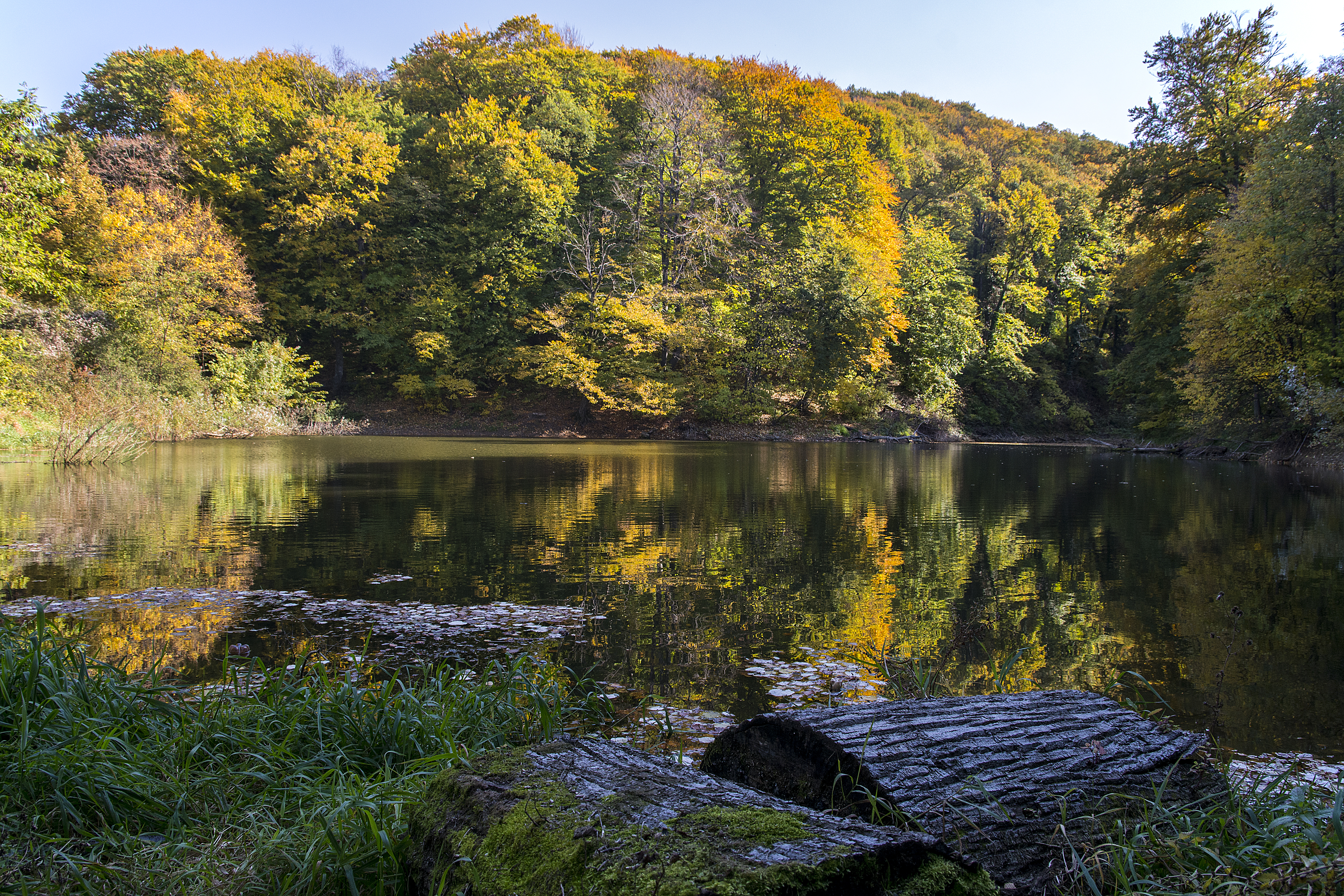
Fruška Gora

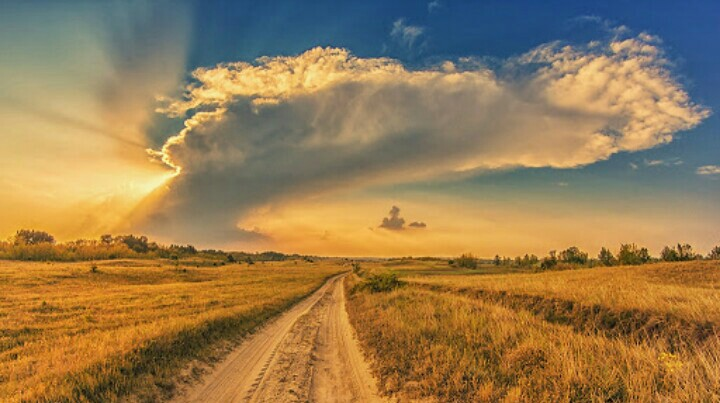
Deliblatska Peščara

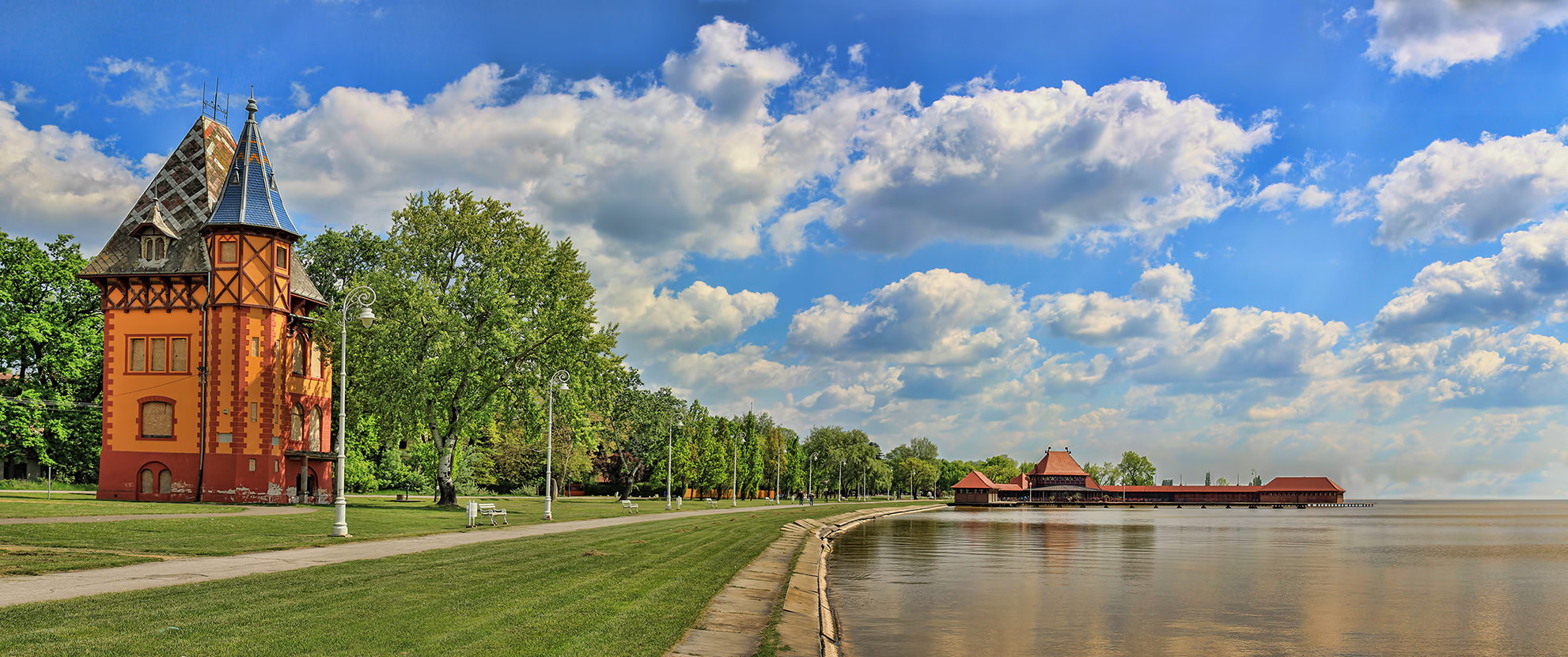
Lake Palić

== Politics ==
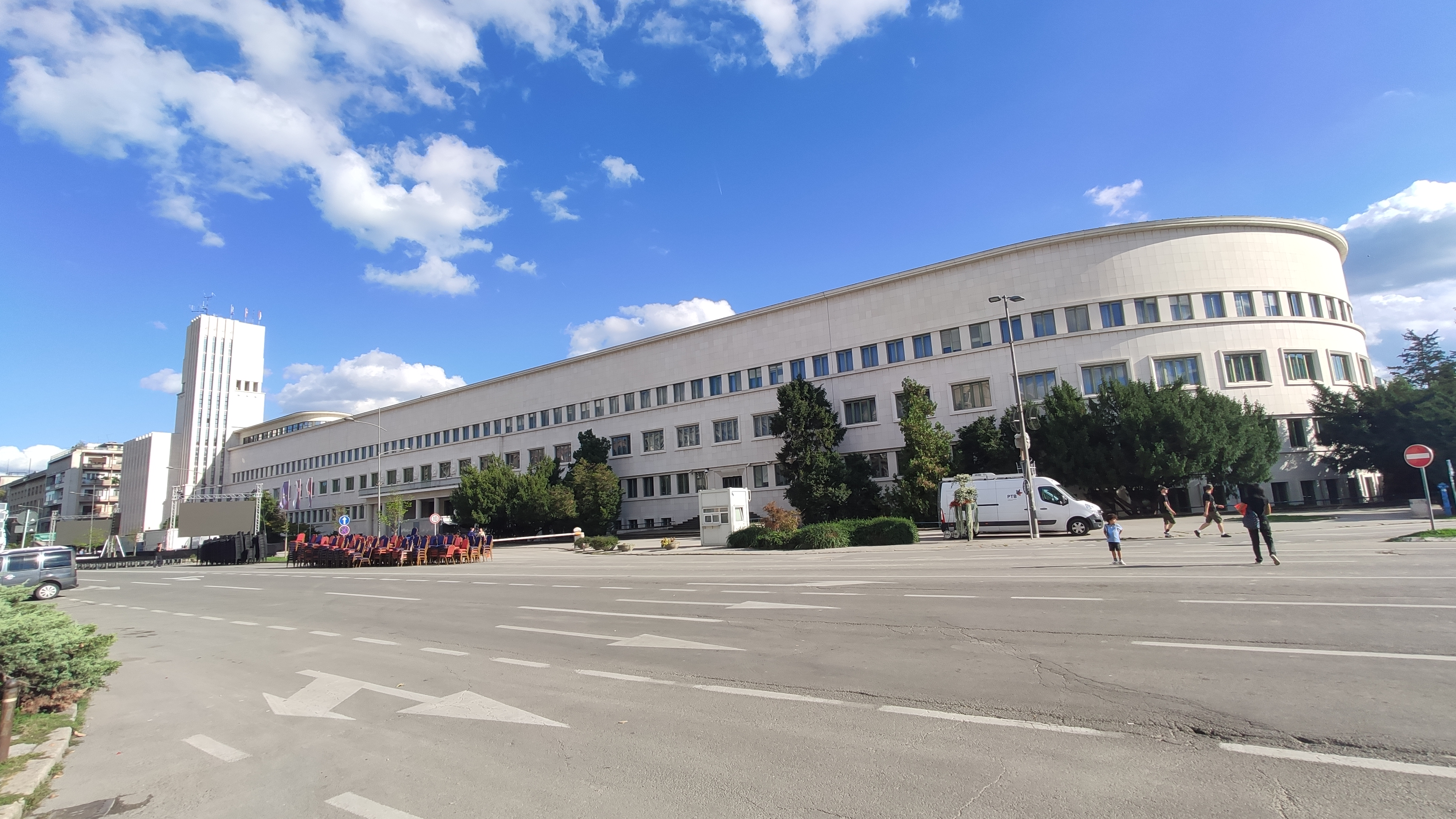
The Banovina Palace, seat of the Government of Vojvodina and Assembly of Vojvodina

The competencies of Vojvodina provincial bodies are relatively limited, focused primarily on executive power without any substantive legislative jurisdiction.

The Assembly of Vojvodina is the provincial legislature composed of 120 proportionally elected members. The Government of Vojvodina is the executive body composed of a president, vice-president, and secretaries.

The political landscape of the province is dominated by pan-national political parties and, to a lesser degree, parties of the ethnic minorities. Once significant regionalist parties, that advocate more autonomy for the province, have not gained significant traction of votes in recent elections and are currently not represented in the Assembly of Vojvodina. Since 2016, the Serbian Progressive Party has been the dominant power in the provincial politics.

Vojvodina is divided into 45 local government units: 37 municipalities and the 8 cities (Novi Sad, Subotica, Pančevo, Zrenjanin, Sombor, Sremska Mitrovica, Kikinda, and Vršac). Besides the local government, there are also seven administrative districts, which are regional centers of central government, but have no powers of their own.

== Demographics ==
Vojvodina is ethnically, religiously, and linguistically one of the more diverse regions in Europe.

=== Ethnic structure ===
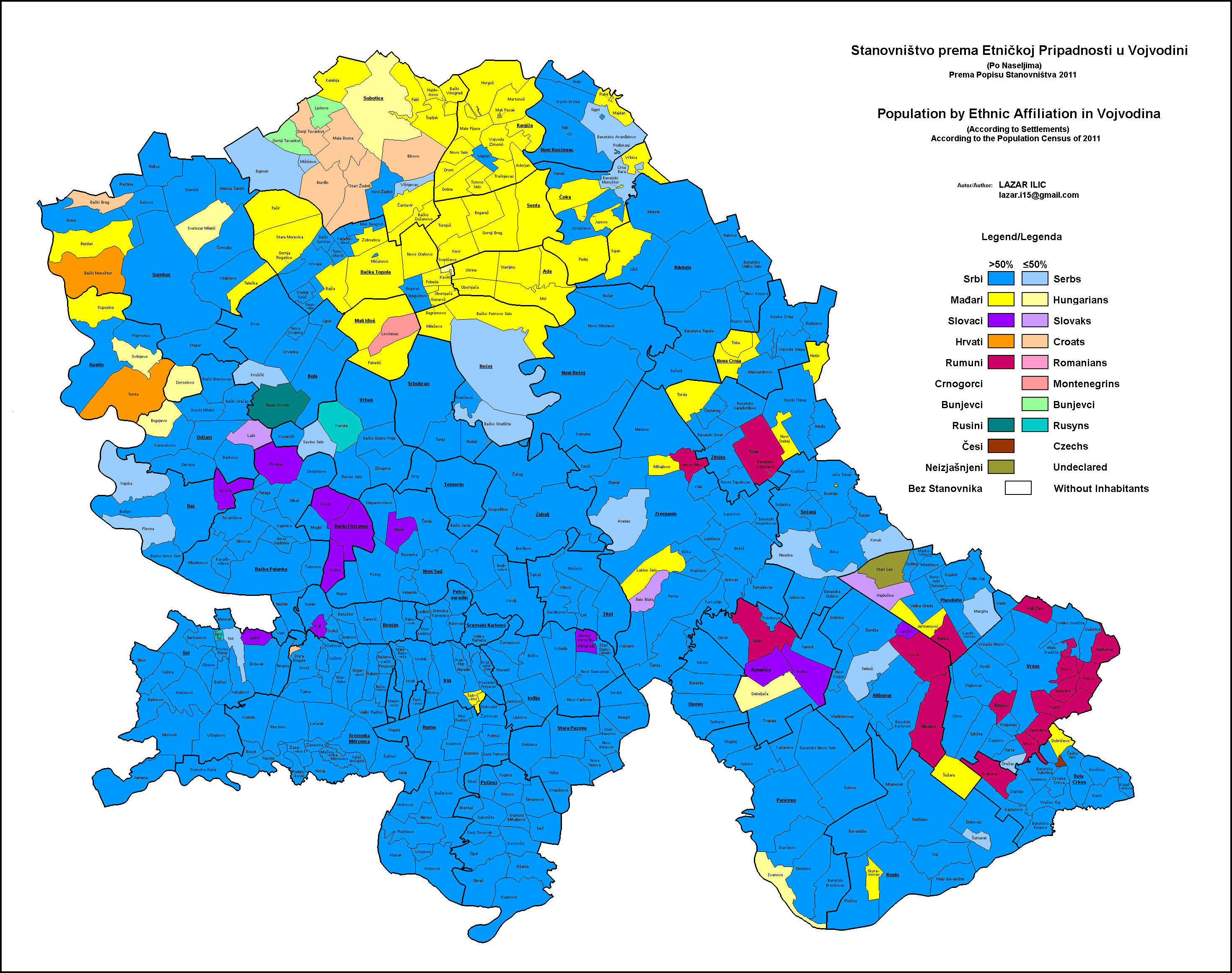
Ethnic map, 2011

According to data from the 2022 census, the ethnic structure of the population is as follows:

Ethnicity	Population	Share
Serbs	1,190,785	68.4%
Hungarians	182,321	10.5%
Roma	40,938	2.3%
Slovaks	39,807	2.3%
Croats	32,684	1.9%
Romanians	19,595	1.1%
Yugoslavs	12,438	0.7%
Montenegrins	12,424	0.7%
Rusyns	11,207	0.6%
Bunjevci	10,949	0.6%
Others	33,325	1.9%
Regional identity	9,985	1.5%
Undeclared	70,339	4.2%
Unknown	73,433	4.2%

Historical population
Year	Pop.	±%
1787	476,018	—
1828	864,281	+81.6%
1840	912,754	+5.6%
1857	1,030,545	+12.9%
1880	1,172,729	+13.8%
1890	1,331,143	+13.5%
1900	1,432,748	+7.6%
1910	1,512,983	+5.6%
1921	1,528,238	+1.0%
1931	1,624,158	+6.3%
1931	1,636,367	+0.8%
1948	1,663,212	+1.6%
1953	1,699,545	+2.2%
1961	1,854,965	+9.1%
1971	1,952,533	+5.3%
1981	2,034,772	+4.2%
1991	2,012,517	−1.1%
2002	2,031,992	+1.0%
2011	1,931,809	−4.9%
2022	1,740,230	−9.9%

=== Religious structure ===
According to data from the 2022 census, the religious structure of the population is as follows:

Religion	Adherents	Share
Orthodox	1,228,326	70.6%
Catholic	243,587	14%
Protestant	47,568	2.7%
Muslim	15,049	0.8%
Judaism	196	0.01%
Atheist	25,192	1.4%
Agnostic	2,458	0.1%
Other	9,601	0.5%
Undeclared	84,288	4.8%
Unknown	83,965	4.8%

=== Linguistic structure ===
Besides Serbian, the official language of Serbia, there are five languages of ethnic minorities (Hungarian, Slovak, Romanian, Croatian, and Rusyn) that are in official use by the provincial administration. There is a daily newspaper, Magyar Szó, published in Hungarian. Monthly and weekly publications in languages of ethnic minorities include Hlas Ľudu in Slovak, Libertatea in Romanian, Hrvatska riječ in Croatian, and Ruske slovo in Rusyn. The provincial public broadcaster, Radio Television of Vojvodina, on its television RTV2 channel broadcasts programming on languages of ethnic minorities, as well as on its two radio frequencies: Radio Novi Sad 2 (in Hungarian) and Radio Novi Sad 3 (other languages).

According to data from the 2022 census, the linguistic structure of the population is as follows:

Language	Speakers	Share
Serbian	1,329,899	76.4%
Hungarian	169,518	9.7%
Slovak	37,053	2.1%
Romani	22,891	1.3%
Romanian	18,038	1%
Croatian	9,298	0.5%
Rusyn	8,605	0.5%
Other	37,135	2.1%
Undeclared	41,783	2.4%
Unknown	66,010	3.8%

=== Cities and towns ===
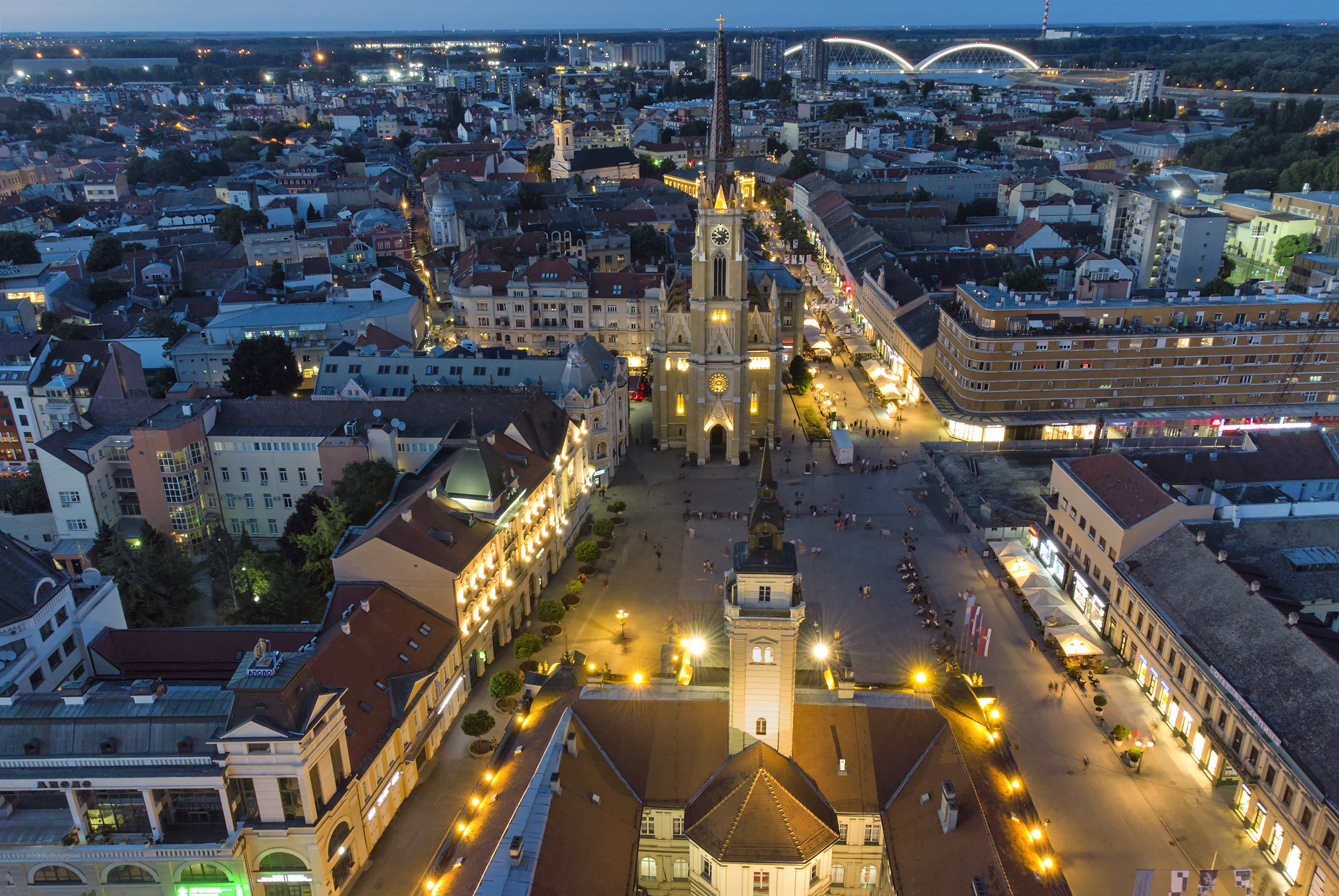
Historic downtown of Novi Sad

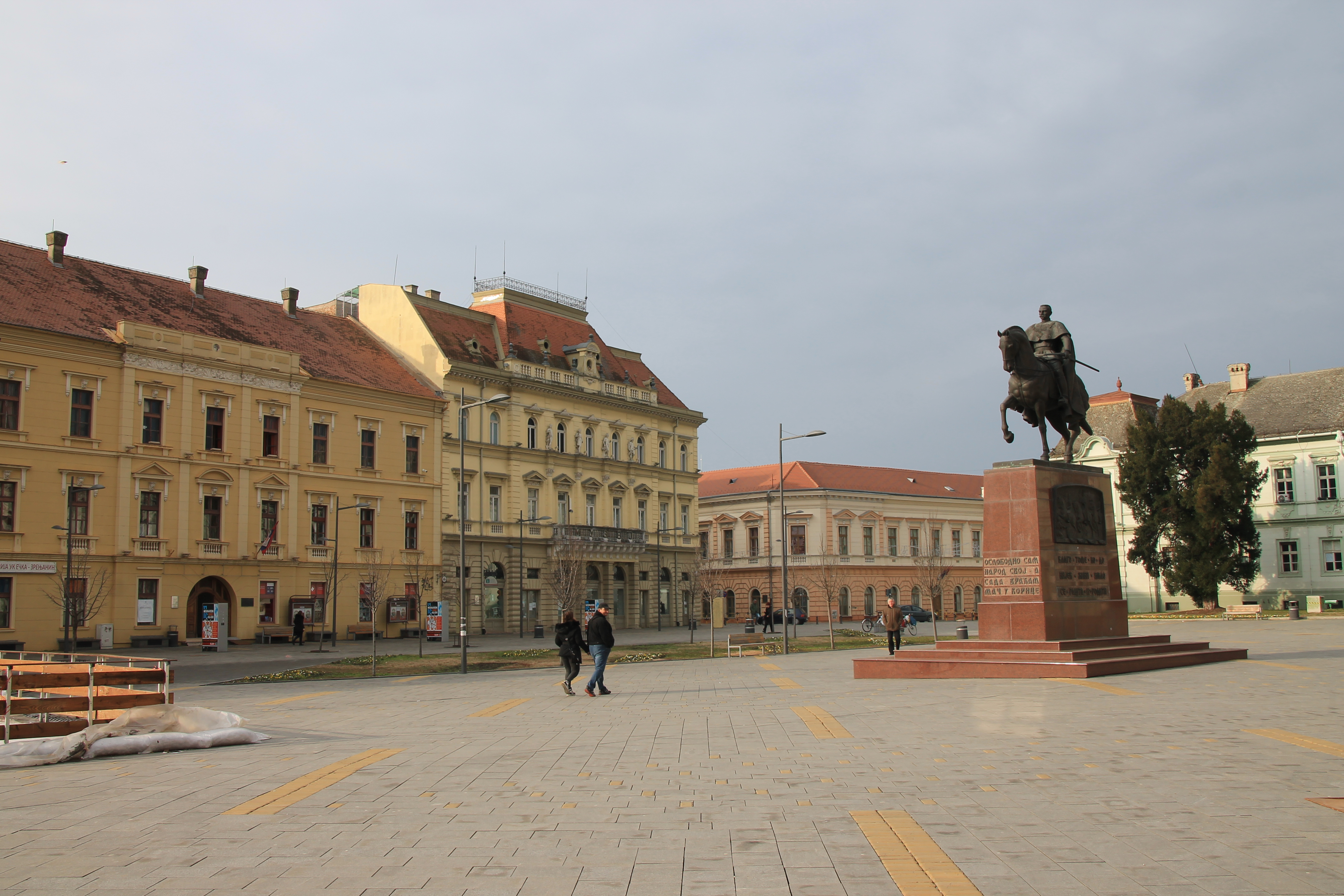
Zrenjanin central square

There are 12 cities and towns in Vojvodina with over 20,000 inhabitants:

- Novi Sad: 325,551 (Note: Contiguous urban area (including adjacent settlements of Petrovaradin, Sremska Kamenica, Veternik, and Futog).)
- Subotica: 88,752
- Pančevo: 73,401
- Zrenjanin: 67,129
- Sombor: 41,814
- Sremska Mitrovica: 36,764
- Kikinda: 32,084
- Vršac: 31,946
- Ruma: 27,747
- Bačka Palanka: 25,476
- Inđija: 24,450
- Vrbas: 20,892

== Economy ==
Vojvodina is one of Serbia’s most developed regions, second only to Belgrade region in economic output. It accounts for more than a quarter of country’s GDP, though its relative contribution has declined in recent decades. However, economic disparities persist, with many areas lagging behind economic strongholds such as south Bačka (centered around Novi Sad), south Banat (centered around Pančevo, and to a lesser degree, Vršac), and Syrmia (with towns of Inđija, Sremska Mitrovica, Ruma).

Vojvodina is often referred to as the "breadbasket of Serbia" due to its rich soil and flat terrain ideal for large-scale farming. Region's rich chernozem soils cover much of its 1.65 million hectares of arable land, equivalent to the combined arable land of Austria, the Netherlands, Belgium, and Luxembourg. This makes it Serbia’s agricultural heartland, producing much of the nation’s wheat, maize, sugar beets, sunflowers, and oilseeds. In addition, Fruška Gora and Vršac Mountains, are two of the most important viticulture regions in Serbia.

Relatively significant deposits of oil and natural gas are located in Banat, and their extraction satisfies some 20% of Serbia's needs. The Pančevo Oil Refinery, with annual capacity of 4.8 million tonnes, is one of the most modern oil-refineries in Europe. Vojvodina plays a vital role for energy transport in a wider region as is traversed with several major pipelines: TurkStream natural gas pipeline (capacity of 16 billion cu m), branch of Adria crude oil pipeline, and currently ongoing project of crude oil pipeline between Algyő and Novi Sad (capacity of 5 million TOE, due to be completed by 2028). Bulk of Serbia's renewable energy generated from wind power comes from southern Banat as some large scale wind farm projects have been developed in the area in the last decade.

Key industrial sectors include food processing, metal and machinery production, as well as chemical and pharmaceutical industry. The IT industry has seen notable growth, driven by foreign investments and a skilled workforce, particularly in Novi Sad, which is a tech hub of Serbia.

Several pan-European transport corridors run through Vojvodina: corridor X (as the A1 motorway and the A3 motorway, respectively; as well as a double-track high-speed rail from Belgrade to Subotica) and corridor VII (the Danube river waterway). The three largest rivers in Vojvodina are navigable stream: Danube with a length of 588 kilometers and its tributaries Tisza (168 km), Sava (206 km), and Bega (75 km). Among them was dug extensive network of irrigation canals, drainage and transport, with a total length of 939 km (583 mi), of which 673 km (418 mi) navigable.

== Culture ==
Vojvodina’s cultural identity stems from centuries of interaction among Slavic, Hungarian, German, and other communities. The region was a significant cultural hub for Serbs under Habsburg rule, with Novi Sad earning the nickname "Serbian Athens" for its role in preserving Serbian culture during the 19th century, with cultural institutions like Matica srpska (the oldest matica in the world, founded 1826) and the Serbian National Theatre (1861).

The Fruška Gora mountain hosts 17 Serbian Orthodox monasteries, dating back centuries, such as Krušedol and Novo Hopovo. Baroque town of Sremski Karlovci was for a long time center of Serbian Orthodox culture. Archaeological sites of the Starčevo culture (Neolithic period), highlight Vojvodina’s ancient heritage.

== See also ==
- Administrative divisions of Serbia
