= Radovan Vlajković =

Former President of Yugoslavia

Radovan Vlajković Радован Влајковић
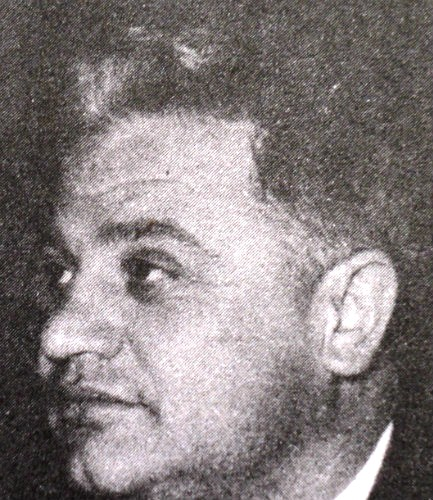
- Radovan Vlajković in 1964

7th President of the Presidency of Yugoslavia
- In office 15 May 1985 – 15 May 1986
- Prime Minister: Milka Planinc
- Preceded by: Veselin Đuranović
- Succeeded by: Sinan Hasani

President of the Assembly of Vojvodina
- In office 18 July 1963 – 20 April 1967
- Preceded by: Stevan Doronjski
- Succeeded by: Ilija Rajačić

Personal details
- Born: 18 November 1922 Buđanovci, Kingdom of Serbs, Croats and Slovenes
- Died: 12 November 2001 (aged 78) Novi Sad, Serbia, FR Yugoslavia
- Party: League of Communists of Yugoslavia (SKJ)

Radovan Vlajkovic (Serbian Cyrillic: Радован Влајковић; 18 November 1922 – 12 November 2001) was a Yugoslav politician who served as Chairman of the collective presidency of Yugoslavia from 1985 until 1986. He was also Speaker of the Assembly of Vojvodina from 1963–1967.

Political offices
Preceded by Veselin Đuranović	President of the Presidency of SFR Yugoslavia; 15 May 1985 – 15 May 1986	Succeeded by Sinan Hasani
