= Stevan Doronjski =

Yugoslav civil servant

President of the Presidency of the Central Committee of the League of Communists of Yugoslavia
- In office 4 May 1980 – 20 October 1980
- Preceded by: Josip Broz Tito
- Succeeded by: Lazar Mojsov

President of the Executive Council of the Socialist Republic of Serbia
- In office 6 November 1964 – 17 November 1964
- Preceded by: Slobodan Penezić
- Succeeded by: Dragi Stamenković

President of the Assembly of the Socialist Autonomous Province of Vojvodina
- In office December 1953 – 18 July 1963
- Preceded by: Luka Mrkšić
- Succeeded by: Radovan Vlajković

Personal details
- Born: 26 September 1919 Krčedin, Kingdom of Serbs, Croats and Slovenes
- Died: 14 August 1981 (aged 61) Belgrade, SR Serbia, SFR Yugoslavia
- Party: League of Communists of Yugoslavia (SKJ)
- Education: University of Belgrade

Stevan Doronjski (26 September 1919 – 14 August 1981) was a Yugoslav civil servant from Serbia who served as President of the Presidency of the League of Communists of Yugoslavia, the ruling party of the nation.

Doronjski was born in 1919 in the village of Krčedin in the Srem region of Serbia to a peasant family. He studied veterinary medicine at the University of Belgrade and joined the Communist Party in 1939. He fought with the Partisans in World War II and after the war held a number of political posts in the newly formed Socialist Federal Republic of Yugoslavia.

Doronjski died on 14 August 1981 at the age of 61.
