= Autonomous province =

Administrative division

An autonomous province is a type of province that has administrative autonomy. In political history, the term has been used as a designation for various types of autonomous entities, at medium levels of administrative hierarchy. In relative terms, an autonomous province usually has less autonomy than an autonomous state, but more autonomy than an autonomous region. Administrative autonomy of a province can be expressed in its official name, by the use of a particular term designating the autonomy, but such a term can also be omitted. In that case, the autonomous status of a province can be determined on the basis of relevant legal provisions.

== Occurrences ==
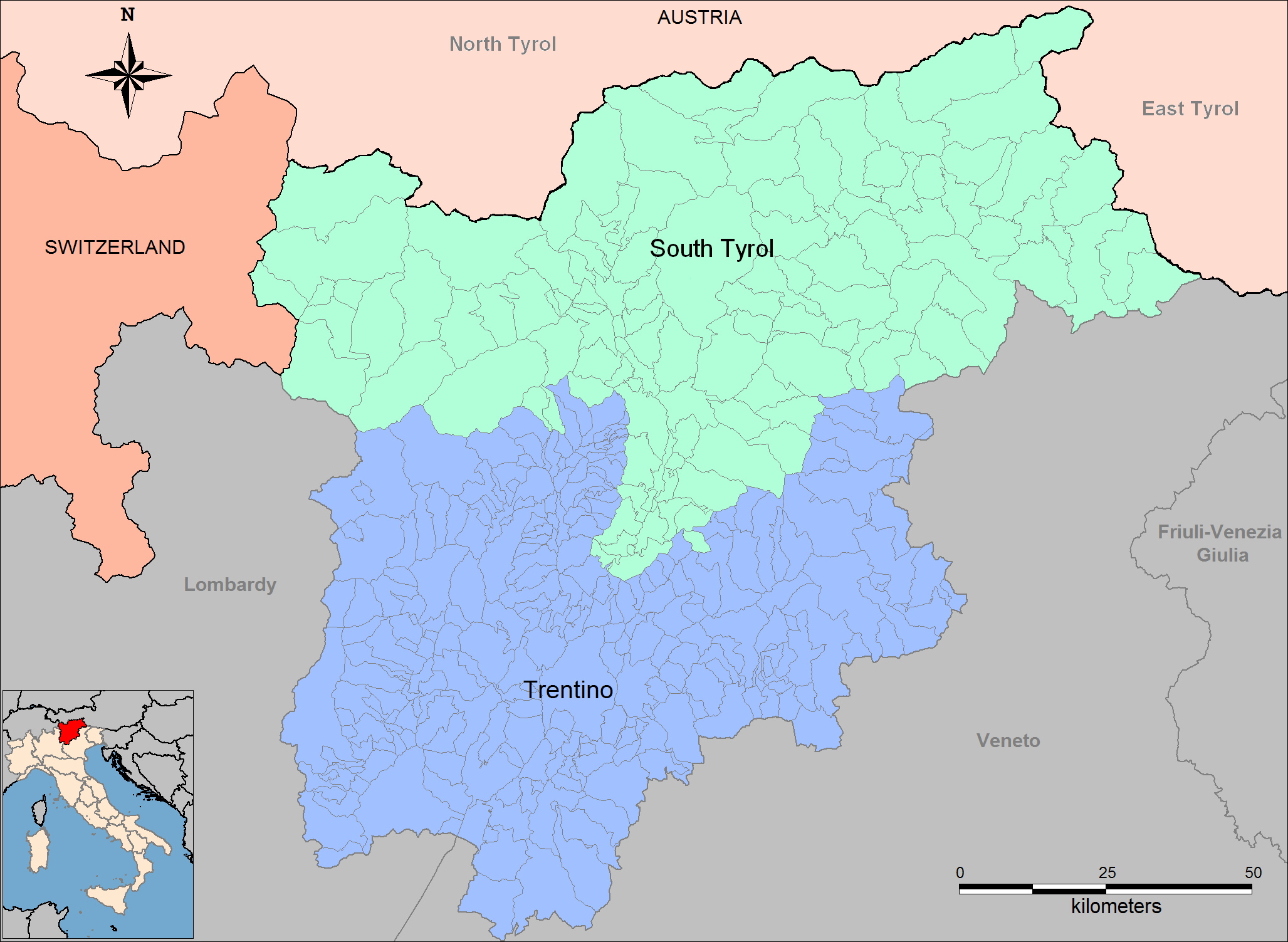
Italian autonomous provinces of Trentino and South Tyrol

=== Italy ===
In Italy, there are two autonomous provinces:

- Autonomous Province of Trento
- Autonomous Province of South Tyrol

=== Serbia ===
In Serbia, there are two autonomous provinces:

- Autonomous Province of Vojvodina
- Autonomous Province of Kosovo and Metohija (claimed but not controlled)

== See also ==
- Special administrative region

== Literature ==
- Aldo Stella, Storia dell'Autonomia trentina, Trento: Edizioni U.C.T, 1997.
