= Central Committee of the 11th Congress of the League of Communists of Yugoslavia =

11th Central Committee
- Emblem of the League of Communists of Yugoslavia

23 June 1978 – 26 June 1982 (4 years, 3 days) Overview
- Type: Highest organ
- Election: 11th Congress

Members
- Total: 167 members
- Newcomers: 69 members (11th)
- Old: 64 members (10th)
- Reelected: 63 members (12th)
- By-elected: 35 individuals

This electoral term of the Central Committee was elected by the 11th Congress of the League of Communists of Yugoslavia in 1978, and was in session until the convocation of the 12th Congress in 1982.

== Convocations ==
Meetings of the Central Committee of the 11th Congress
Meeting	Date	Length	Type	Ref.
1st Session	23 June 1978	1 day	Ordinary	
2nd Session	19 December 1978	1 day	Ordinary	
3rd Session	5 April 1979	1 day	Ordinary	
4th Session	19 April 1979	1 day	Ceremonial	
5th Session	1 May 1979	1 day	Ceremonial	
6th Session	28 June 1979	1 day	Ordinary	
7th Session	16 July 1979	1 day	Ordinary	
8th Session	18 October 1979	1 day	Ordinary	
9th Session	15 January 1980	1 day	Extraordinary	
10th Session	20 February 1980	1 day	Ordinary	
11th Session	12 June 1980	1 day	Ordinary	
12th Session	26 June 1980	1 Day	Ceremonial	
13th Session	29 September 1980	1 day	Ordinary	
14th Session	20 October 1980	1 day	Ceremonial	
15th Session	4 December 1980	1 day	Ordinary	
16th Session	22 January 1981	1 day	Ordinary	
17th Session	26 February 1981	1 day	Ordinary	
18th Session	? 1981	?	Ordinary	
19th Session	4 May 1981	1 day	Commemorative	
20th Session	6–7 May 1981	2 days	Ordinary	
21st Session	1 October 1981	1 day	Ordinary	
22nd Session	17 November 1981	1 day	Ordinary	
23rd Session	23 December 1981	1 day	Ordinary	
24th Session	16 March 1982	1 day	Ordinary	
25th Session	8–9 April 1982	2 days	Ordinary	
26th Session	20 April 1982	1 day	Ordinary	

== Composition ==
=== Members ===
Note: all 3 "by-elected" membres signed "CC" returned to membership of the CC

Members of the Central Committee of the 11th Congress of the League of Communists of Yugoslavia
Name	10th	12th	Birth	PM	Death	Branch	Nationality	Gender	Ref.
Ramiz Abduli	New	Elected	1928	1946	1996	Yugoslav People's Army	Albanian	Male	
Mustafa Amitov	New	Not	1926	1945	?	Macedonia	Turk	Male	
Vladimir Bakarić	Old	Elected	1912	1933	1983	Croatia	Croat	Male	
Janez Barborič	New	Died	1931	1959	1980	Slovenia	Slovene	Male	
Žarko Bošković	New	Replaced	1943	1961	?	Montenegro	Montenegrin	Male	
Mirko Božić	New	Not	1919	1944	1995	Croatia	Croat	Male	
Luka Bročilo	New	Not	1935	1953	?	Croatia	Serb	Male	
Marko Bulc	Old	Not	1926	1944	2019	Slovenia	Slovene	Male	
Franjo Čordašić	Old	Not	1931	1951	?	Croatia	Croat	Male	
Nurija Ćosović	New	Not	1938	1957	?	Montenegro	Muslim	Male	
Dane Ćuić	New	Elected	1923	1942	1988	Yugoslav People's Army	Serb	Male	
Dobroslav Čulafić	CC	Not	1926	1944	2011	Montenegro	Montenegrin	Male	
Ljubomir Čupić	New	Not	1938	1950	?	Vojvodina	Serb	Male	
Milan Daljević	New	Not	1925	1942	2020	Yugoslav People's Army	Serb	Male	
Peko Dapčević	Return	Not	1913	1933	1999	Montenegro	Montenegrin	Male	
Velli Deva	Old	Elected	1923	1942	2015	Kosovo	Albanian	Male	
Nijaz Dizdarević	Return	Elected	1920	1942	1989	Bosnia-Herzegovina	Muslim	Male	
Drita Dobroši	New	Not	1928	1944	?	Kosovo	Serb	Female	
Stane Dolanc	Old	Elected	1925	1944	1999	Slovenia	Slovene	Male	
Stevan Doronjski	Old	Died	1919	1939	1981	Vojvodina	Serb	Male	
Ilija Đozinski	New	Not	1942	1963	?	Macedonia	Macedonian	Male	
Zvone Dragan	CC	Not	1939	1958	Alive	Slovenia	Slovene	Male	
Dušan Dragosavac	New	Elected	1919	1942	2014	Croatia	Serb	Male	
Obrad Drljević	New	Not	1948	1967	?	Montenegro	Montenegrin	Male	
Milojko Drulović	New	Elected	1923	1941	1989	Serbia	Serb	Male	
Anton Duda	New	Not	1939	1957	?	Croatia	Croat	Male	
Vaska Duganova	Old	Not	1922	1942	1996	Macedonia	Macedonian	Female	
Rato Dugonjić	Old	Elected	1916	1937	1987	Bosnia-Herzegovina	Serb	Male	
Veselin Đuranović	New	Not	1925	1944	1997	Montenegro	Montenegrin	Male	
Mirčeta Đurović	New	Not	1924	1945	2011	Montenegro	Montenegrin	Male	
Svetozar Durutović	New	Not	1935	1954	?	Montenegro	Montenegrin	Male	
Muša Dušaj	New	Not	1950	1974	?	Montenegro	Albanian	Female	
Risto Džunov	New	Not	1919	1940	2005	Macedonia	Macedonian	Male	
Slobodan Filipović	New	Not	1939	1959	1995	Montenegro	Montenegrin	Male	
Vaso Gačić	New	Not	1923	1942	2006	Bosnia-Herzegovina	Serb	Male	
Pavle Gaži	New	Not	1927	1945	2021	Croatia	Croat	Male	
Dušan Gligorijević	New	Elected	1920	1941	2008	Serbia	Serb	Male	
Kiro Gligorov	Old	Not	1917	1944	2012	Macedonia	Macedonian	Male	
Vesela Gogova	New	Elected	1923	1961	?	Macedonia	Macedonian	Female	
Petar Gračanin	New	Elected	1923	1942	2004	Yugoslav People's Army	Serb	Male	
Aleksandar Grličkov	Old	Elected	1923	1943	1989	Macedonia	Macedonian	Male	
Fatima Hadžialić	New	Not	1925	1944	?	Bosnia-Herzegovina	Muslim	Female	
Kiro Hadživasilev	Old	Elected	1921	1943	2000	Macedonia	Macedonian	Male	
Katalin Hajnal	New	Not	1944	1963	?	Vojvodina	Hungarian	Female	
Sinan Hasani	New	Elected	1922	1942	2010	Kosovo	Albanian	Male	
Franjo Herljević	Old	Elected	1915	1940	1998	Bosnia-Herzegovina	Croat	Male	
Fadilj Hodža	Old	Elected	1916	1936	2001	Kosovo	Albanian	Male	
Emira Islamović	New	Not	1953	1971	?	Bosnia-Herzegovina	Muslim	Female	
Trpe Jakovlevski	Old	Not	1925	1944	2005	Macedonia	Macedonian	Male	
Bosiljka Janjatović	New	Not	1936	1964	2006	Croatia	Yugoslav	Female	
Vlado Janžić	New	Not	1936	1956	2016	Slovenia	Slovene	Male	
Silva Jereb	Old	Not	1930	1948	2013	Slovenia	Slovene	Female	
Nikola Jončić-Koča	New	Not	1922	1941	?	Serbia	Serb	Male	
Rahmija Kadenić	New	Not	1920	1939	2000	Yugoslav People's Army	Yugoslav	Male	
Edvard Kardelj	Old	Died	1910	1928	1979	Slovenia	Slovene	Male	
Danilo Kekić	New	Not	1918	1939	1999	Vojvodina	Serb	Male	
Alojz Kikec	New	Not	1934	1956	?	Slovenia	Slovene	Male	
Jaroslav Kobar	New	Not	1945	1968	?	Vojvodina	Slovak	Male	
Fana Kočovska	Old	Not	1927	1943	2004	Macedonia	Macedonian	Female	
Predrag Kojašević	New	Not	1936	1957	?	Montenegro	Montenegrin	Male	
Rudi Kolak	Old	Elected	1918	1940	2004	Bosnia-Herzegovina	Croat	Male	
Lazar Koliševski	Old	Elected	1914	1935	2000	Macedonia	Macedonian	Male	
Radomir Komatina	New	Not	1922	1940	2001	Montenegro	Montenegrin	Male	
Miladin Korać	Old	Elected	1924	1945	2002	Serbia	Muslim	Male	
Štefan Korošec	New	Not	1938	1957	2014	Slovenia	Slovene	Male	
Dragutin Kosovac	New	Elected	1924	1941	2012	Bosnia-Herzegovina	Serb	Male	
Đorđe Kostić	New	Elected	1921	1946	?	Serbia	Serb	Male	
Hristivoje Kostić	New	Not	1943	1968	?	Serbia	Serb	Male	
Ferhard Kotorić	New	Not	1934	1952	?	Bosnia-Herzegovina	Muslim	Male	
Milija Kovačević	New	Not	1914	1937	2023	Kosovo	Montenegrin	Female	
Sergej Kraigher	CC	Elected	1914	1934	2001	Slovenia	Slovene	Male	
Nenad Krekić	Old	Not	1942	1958	2021	Croatia	Yugoslav	Male	
Anica Kuhar	New	Not	1922	1942	2018	Slovenia	Slovene	Female	
Ivan Kukoč	Old	Elected	1918	1935	2005	Croatia	Croat	Male	
Pero Kukon	New	Not	1929	1948	?	Croatia	Croat	Male	
Iljaz Kurteši	New	Not	1927	1949	2016	Kosovo	Albanian	Male	
Todo Kurtović	Old	Elected	1919	1941	1997	Bosnia-Herzegovina	Serb	Male	
Rudi Lepej	New	Replaced	1944	1968	?	Slovenia	Slovene	Male	
Stanko Lepej	Old	Not	1942	1961	Alive	Slovenia	Slovene	Male	
Nikola Ljubičić	Old	Elected	1916	1941	2005	Yugoslav People's Army	Serb	Male	
Nandor Major	New	Elected	1931	1952	2022	Vojvodina	Hungarian	Male	
Branko Mamula	New	Elected	1921	1942	2021	Yugoslav People's Army	Serb	Male	
Ivo Margan	New	Not	1926	1948	2010	Croatia	Croat	Male	
Andrej Marinc	New	Elected	1930	1947	2025	Slovenia	Slovene	Male	
Dragoslav Marković	New	Elected	1920	1939	2005	Serbia	Serb	Male	
Dragutin Marković	Old	Not	1926	1948	?	Serbia	Serb	Male	
Petar Matić	New	Elected	1920	1940	Alive	Yugoslav People's Army	Serb	Male	
Milena Matijević	New	Not	1949	1968	?	Serbia	Yugoslav	Female	
Mijat Merdović	New	Not	1928	1946	2008	Montenegro	Serb	Male	
Munir Mesihović	Old	Elected	1928	1946	2016	Bosnia-Herzegovina	Muslim	Male	
Vukosava Mićunović	New	Not	1921	1942	2016	Montenegro	Yugoslav	Female	
Lambe Mihajlovski	New	Not	1924	1944	2006	Yugoslav People's Army	Macedonian	Male	
Cvijetin Mijatović	Old	Elected	1913	1933	1993	Bosnia-Herzegovina	Serb	Male	
Branko Mikulić	Old	Elected	1928	1945	1994	Bosnia-Herzegovina	Croat	Male	
Nazmi Mikullovci	New	Not	1943	1964	2023	Kosovo	Albanian	Male	
Radonja Milosavljević	New	Not	1931	1950	?	Serbia	Serb	Male	
Miloš Minić	Old	Elected	1914	1936	2003	Serbia	Serb	Male	
Lazar Mojsov	Old	Elected	1920	1940	2011	Macedonia	Macedonian	Male	
Ištvan Molnar	New	Not	1942	1967	?	Vojvodina	Hungarian	Male	
Tome Momirovski	New	Not	1927	1944	2012	Macedonia	Macedonian	Male	
Kosta Nađ	Old	Not	1911	1937	1986	Vojvodina	Yugoslav	Male	
Bogoljub Nedeljković	New	Elected	1920	1942	1986	Kosovo	Serb	Male	
Džavid Nimani	New	Not	1919	1941	2000	Kosovo	Albanian	Male	
Marko Orlandić	New	Not	1930	1948	2019	Montenegro	Montenegrin	Male	
Mirko Ostojić	New	Elected	1923	1941	?	Bosnia-Herzegovina	Serb	Male	
Milan Pavić	New	Elected	1942	1959	2011	Croatia	Serb	Male	
Ivo Perišin	New	Elected	1925	1941	2008	Croatia	Croat	Male	
Dane Petkovski	New	Not	1922	1943	2005	Macedonia	Macedonian	Male	
Metodi Petrovski	New	Not	1938	1959	?	Macedonia	Macedonian	Male	
Mirjana Poček-Matić	Old	Not	1932	1959	2005	Croatia	Montenegrin	Female	
Dušan Popović	Old	Elected	1921	1944	2014	Vojvodina	Serb	Male	
Mirko Popović	Old	Not	1923	1941	1986	Serbia	Serb	Male	
Stane Potočar	Old	Not	1919	1942	1997	Yugoslav People's Army	Slovene	Male	
Hamdija Pozderac	New	Elected	1924	1943	1988	Bosnia-Herzegovina	Muslim	Male	
Hisen Ramadani	Old	Elected	1933	1954	2012	Macedonia	Albanian	Male	
Miha Ravnik	Old	Not	1938	1957	2021	Slovenia	Slovene	Male	
Milorad Roganović	New	Not	1940	1958	2016	Montenegro	Montenegrin	Male	
Sava Savatić	Old	Not	1933	1952	?	Serbia	Serb	Male	
Svetislav Simić	New	Not	1926	1945	?	Serbia	Serb	Male	
Janko Smole	New	Elected	1921	1944	2010	Slovenia	Slovene	Male	
Jože Smole	Old	Not	1927	1943	1996	Slovenia	Slovene	Male	
Petar Stambolić	Old	Elected	1912	1933	2007	Serbia	Serb	Male	
Jelena Stanošević	New	Not	1937	1956	?	Serbia	Serb	Female	
Vulnet Starova	New	Not	1934	1960	1995	Macedonia	Albanian	Male	
Dragoljub Stavrev	Old	Not	1932	1950	2003	Macedonia	Macedonian	Male	
Đorđe Stojšić	New	Not	1928	1945	2014	Vojvodina	Serb	Male	
Ante Sučić	New	Not	1929	1948	1986	Bosnia-Herzegovina	Croat	Male	
Slavko Šajber	Old	Not	1929	1948	2003	Croatia	Croat	Male	
Džemil Šarac	Old	Not	1921	1941	2002	Yugoslav People's Army	Muslim	Male	
Boško Šiljegović	Old	Elected	1915	1940	1990	Bosnia-Herzegovina	Serb	Male	
Kolj Široka	New	Elected	1922	1941	1994	Kosovo	Albanian	Male	
Branislav Škembarević	New	Not	1920	1941	2003	Kosovo	Serb	Male	
Mika Špiljak	Old	Elected	1916	1938	2007	Croatia	Croat	Male	
Stevan Sublja	New	Not	1932	1962	?	Vojvodina	Romanian	Male	
Mijat Šuković	New	Not	1930	1948	2011	Montenegro	Montenegrin	Male	
Ali Šukrija	Old	Elected	1919	1939	2005	Kosovo	Albanian	Male	
Franc Tavčar	Old	Not	1920	1941	2002	Yugoslav People's Army	Slovene	Male	
Jelica Titin	New	Not	1952	1973	?	Vojvodina	Serb	Female	
Vida Tomšič	Old	Not	1913	1934	1998	Slovenia	Slovene	Female	
Đuro Trbović	New	Not	1931	1949	?	Kosovo	Croat	Male	
Branko Trpenovski	New	Elected	1934	1952	2005	Macedonia	Macedonian	Male	
Anton Tus	New	Not	1931	1950	2023	Yugoslav People's Army	Croat	Male	
Albina Tušar	New	Not	1941	1960	?	Slovenia	Slovene	Female	
Gojko Ubiparip	New	Not	1927	1948	2000	Bosnia-Herzegovina	Serb	Male	
Ljubiša Vagner	New	Not	1937	1963	2021	Serbia	Serb	Male	
Franjo Varga	Old	Not	1925	1945	?	Croatia	Croat	Male	
Živan Vasiljević	New	Elected	1920	1941	2007	Serbia	Serb	Male	
Mirko Vidaković	Old	Not	1935	1962	?	Vojvodina	Croat	Male	
Dobrivoje Vidić	Old	Elected	1918	1939	1992	Serbia	Serb	Male	
Radovan Vlajković	New	Elected	1922	1943	2001	Vojvodina	Serb	Male	
Radovan Vojvodić	Old	Not	1922	1940	2000	Yugoslav People's Army	Montenegrin	Male	
Mirko Vranić	New	Not	1920	1942	2002	Bosnia-Herzegovina	Croat	Male	
Josip Vrhovec	Old	Elected	1926	1944	2006	Croatia	Croat	Male	
Jovan Vujadinović	Old	Not	1921	1943	?	Montenegro	Montenegrin	Male	
Bruno Vuletić	New	Elected	1924	1942	?	Yugoslav People's Army	Croat	Male	
Iztok Winkler	Old	Not	1939	1959	2013	Slovenia	Slovene	Male	
Vidoje Žarković	Old	Elected	1927	1943	2000	Montenegro	Montenegrin	Male	
Milovan Zidar	New	Not	1931	1949	2024	Slovenia	Slovene	Male	
Milorad Zorić	New	Not	1913	1939	?	Montenegro	Montenegrin	Male	
Miloš Zorić	New	Not	1941	1966	?	Kosovo	Serb	Male	

=== Ex-officio ===
Ex-Officio Members of the Central Committee of the 11th Congress of the League of Communists of Yugoslavia
Name	10th	12th	Birth	PM	Death	Branch	Nationality	Gender	Ref.
Dušan Alimpić	Old	Elected	1921	1941	2002	Vojvodina	Serb	Male	
Mahmut Bakalli	Old	Not	1936	1957	2006	Kosovo	Albanian	Male	
Angel Čemerski	Old	Elected	1923	1942	2003	Macedonia	Macedonian	Male	
Boško Krunić	CC	Elected	1929	1945	2017	Vojvodina	Serb	Male	
Milka Planinc	Old	Elected	1924	1944	2010	Croatia	Croat	Female	
France Popit	Old	Not	1921	1940	2013	Slovenia	Slovene	Male	
Vojislav Srzentić	Old	Elected	1934	1952	Alive	Montenegro	Montenegrin	Male	
Nikola Stojanović	New	Elected	1933	1952	2020	Bosnia-Herzegovina	Serb	Male	
Josip Broz Tito	Old	Died	1892	1920	1980	None	Croat	Male	
Tihomir Vlaškalić	Old	Elected	1923	1945	1993	Serbia	Serb	Male	

== Bibliography ==
=== Books ===
- Djokić, Dejan (2023). A Concise History of Serbia. Cambridge University Press. ISBN 978-1-107-02838-8.
- Đurđić, Dušan (1988). Mirko Popović 1923–1986. Vesti. ISBN 9788673190150.
- Elsie, Robert (2011). Historical Dictionary of Kosovo. Scarecrow Press. ISBN 978-0-8108-7483-1.
- Hetemi, Atdhe (2020). Student Movements for the Republic of Kosovo: 1968, 1981 and 1997. Springer International Publishing. ISBN 978-3-030-54951-0.
- Hazan, Baruch (1985). The East European Political System: Instruments of Power. Westview Press. ISBN 0-8133-7064-7.
- Rajović, Radošin (1970). Jugoslovenski savremenici: Ko je ko u Jugoslaviji [Yugoslav Contemporaries: Who's Who in Yugoslavia] (in Serbo-Croatian). Hronometar.
- Jović, Dejan (2009). Yugoslavia: A State that Withered Away. Purdue University Press. ISBN 9781557534958.
- Lewytzkyj, Borys; Stroynowski, Juliusz (1978). Who's who in the Socialist Countries: A Biographical Encyclopedia of 10,000 Leading Personalities in 16 Communist Countries. K. G. Saur Pub. ISBN 978-0-89664-011-5.
- Opačić, Nine (1968). Društveno-političke zajednice: Socijalističke republike i autonomme pokrajine [Socio-Political Communities: Socialist Republics and Autonomous Provinces] (in Serbo-Croatian). Međunarodna štampa-Interpress.
- Purivatra, Atif (2001). Who Is Who Among Bosniacs. Vijeće kongresa bošnjačkih intelektualaca (Council of the Congress of Bosniac Intellectuals). ISBN 9958-47-080-2.
- Ristovski, Blazé (2009). Македонска енциклопедија [Macedonian Encyclopedia] (in Macedonian). Macedonian Academy of Sciences and Arts. ISBN 978-608-203-023-4. OCLC 499142958.
- Schneider, Henrique (2016). Indifferenz, Gegnerschaft, Identität Veränderungen im politischen Verhältnis von Dorf und Staat im Kosovo [Indifference, Opposition, Identity Changes in the Political Relationship Between Village and State in Kosovo] (in German). BWV Berliner Wissenschafts-Verlag. ISBN 978-3-8305-3717-5.
- Singleton, Frederick Bernard (1985). A Short History of the Yugoslav Peoples. Cambridge University Press. ISBN 978-0-521-27485-2.
- Stanković, Slobodan (1981). The End of the Tito Era: Yugoslavia's Dilemmas. Hoover International Studies. ISBN 9780817973629.
- Stanković, Slobodan (1982a). The Yugoslav Central Committee Plenum. Radio Free Europe Research Institute.
- Stanković, Slobodan (1982b). Yugoslav Central Committee Discusses Economic Difficulties. Radio Free Europe Research Institute.
- Stroynowski, Juliusz, ed. (1989a). Who's Who in the Socialist Countries of Europe: A–H. K. G. Saur Verlag. ISBN 3-598-10719-6.
- Stroynowski, Juliusz, ed. (1989b). Who's Who in the Socialist Countries of Europe: I–O. K. G. Saur Verlag. ISBN 3-598-10719-6.
- Stroynowski, Juliusz, ed. (1989c). Who's Who in the Socialist Countries of Europe: P–Z. K. G. Saur Verlag. ISBN 3-598-10719-6.

=== Journals ===
- Krstić, Dejan (2015). "The Old Cemetery in Zaječar: Socio-cultural Reading". Yugoslav Society for the Scientific Study of Religion Annual. XXII (2015). University of Niš: 113–132.
- Miloradović, Goran (2011). "Глас "ликвидиране генерације": Ауторизовани интервју са филмским редитељем Јованом Јоцом Живановићем" [The voice of the "liquidated generation": Authorised interview with film director Jovan Joco Živanović]. Yearbook of Social History (in Serbian). 17 (2). Institute of Contemporary History: 73–113.

=== Newspapers ===
- "Централни комитет Савеза комуниста Југославије" [Central Committee of the League of Communists of Yugoslavia]. Borba (in Serbo-Croatian). Socialist Alliance of Working People: 6. 30 June 1982.
- "Централни комитет Савеза комуниста Југославије" [Central Committee of the League of Communists of Yugoslavia]. Borba (in Serbo-Croatian). Socialist Alliance of Working People: 6. 30 June 1982.
- "Данас 25. пленум ЦК СКЈ" [Today the 25th Plenum of the CC LCY]. Borba (in Serbo-Croatian). Socialist Alliance of Working People: 1. 8 April 1982. Archived from the original on 18 January 2025.
- "Данас 24. пленум Централног комитета Савеза комуниста Југославије" [Today the 24th Plenum of the Central Committee of the League of Communists of Yugoslavia]. Borba (in Serbo-Croatian). Socialist Alliance of Working People: 1. 16 March 1982. Archived from the original on 18 January 2025.
- "Данашњи Пленум Централног комитета СКЈ" [Today's Plenum of the Central Committee of the LCY]. Borba (in Serbo-Croatian). Socialist Alliance of Working People: 1. 23 December 1981. Archived from the original on 18 January 2025.
- "Седница Централног комитета Савеза комуниста Југославије" [Session of the Central Committee of the League of Communists of Yugoslavia]. Borba (in Serbo-Croatian). Socialist Alliance of Working People: 1. 18 November 1981. Archived from the original on 18 January 2025.
- "седница Централног комитета Савеза комуниста Југославије" [Session of the Central Committee of the League of Communists of Yugoslavia]. Borba (in Serbo-Croatian). Socialist Alliance of Working People: 1. 1 October 1981.
- "Седница Централног комитета Савеза комуниста Југославије" [Session of the Central Committee of the League of Communists of Yugoslavia]. Borba (in Serbo-Croatian). Socialist Alliance of Working People: 1. 8 May 1981.
- "Титу, на годишњицу смрти" [On the Anniversary of Tito's Death]. Borba (in Serbo-Croatian). Socialist Alliance of Working People: 1. 3 May 1981.
- "Седамнаеста седница Централног комитета Савеза комуниста Југославије" [Seventeenth Session of the Central Committee of the League of Communists of Yugoslavia]. Borba (in Serbo-Croatian). Socialist Alliance of Working People: 1. 27 February 1981.
- "Шеснаеста седница Централног комитета Савеза комуниста Југославије" [Sixteenth Session of the Central Committee of the League of Communists of Yugoslavia]. Borba (in Serbo-Croatian). Socialist Alliance of Working People: 1. 23 January 1981.
- "Петнаеста седница Централног комитета Савеза комуниста Југославије" [Fifteenth Session of the Central Committee of the League of Communists of Yugoslavia]. Borba (in Serbo-Croatian). Socialist Alliance of Working People: 1. 5 December 1980.
- "Свечана седница ЦК СКЈ" [Ceremonial session of the CC LCY]. Borba (in Serbo-Croatian). Socialist Alliance of Working People: 1. 20 October 1980.
- "Седница Централног комитета Савеза комуниста Југославије" [Session of the Central Committee of the League of Communists of Yugoslavia]. Borba (in Serbo-Croatian). Socialist Alliance of Working People: 1. 30 September 1980.
- "Шездесет година црвеног града" [Sixty Years of the Red City]. Borba (in Serbo-Croatian). Socialist Alliance of Working People: 1. 13 June 1980.
- "Седница Централног комитета Савеза комуниста Југославије" [Session of the Central Committee of the League of Communists of Yugoslavia]. Borba (in Serbo-Croatian). Socialist Alliance of Working People: 1. 13 June 1980.
- "Десета седница Централног комитета Савеза комуниста Југославије" [Tenth Session of the Central Committee of the League of Communists of Yugoslavia]. Borba (in Serbo-Croatian). Socialist Alliance of Working People: 1. 20 February 1980.
- "седница Централног ЦК СКЈ" [Session of the Central Committee of the League of Communists of Yugoslavia]. Borba (in Serbo-Croatian). Socialist Alliance of Working People: 1. 16 January 1980.
- "Централни комшцеш СКЈ о остшђарибању бодеће идејне па полштичке улоте СКЈ у полишичком систему социјалистичког самоуправљања" [Central Committee of the League of Communists on the Development of the Ideological and Political Role of the League of Communists in the Political System of Socialist Self-management]. Borba (in Serbo-Croatian). Socialist Alliance of Working People: 1. 19 October 1979.
- "ЗАКЉУЧЦ ЦК СКЈ" [Conclusion of the CC LCY]. Borba (in Serbo-Croatian). Socialist Alliance of Working People: 4. 17 July 1979.
- "Шеста седница Централног Комитета СКЈ" [Sixth Session of the Central Committee of the LCY]. Borba (in Serbo-Croatian). Socialist Alliance of Working People: 1. 29 June 1979.
- "Нови члинови ЦА СКЈ" [New Members of the CC of the LCY]. Borba (in Serbo-Croatian). Socialist Alliance of Working People: 1. 29 June 1979.
- "Прослава јубилеја" [Anniversary Celebration]. Borba (in Serbo-Croatian). Socialist Alliance of Working People: 1. 29 April – 2 May 1979.
- "Свечана седница централног комитета савеза комуниста југославије поводом 60. годишњице оснивања скј, ској и револуционарних синдиката" [Ceremonial session of the Central Committee of the League of Communists of Yugoslavia on the occasion of the 60th anniversary of the founding of the LCY, LCYY and revolutionary trade unions]. Borba (in Serbo-Croatian). Socialist Alliance of Working People: 1. 20 April 1979.
- "Уводна излагања поднели Јосип Врховец и Видоје Жарковић" [Introductory speeches were delivered by Josip Vrhovec and Vidoje Žarković]. Borba (in Serbo-Croatian). Socialist Alliance of Working People: 1. 6 April 1979.
- "Друга пленарна седница Централног комитета Савеза комуниста Југославије" [Second Plenary Session of the Central Committee of the League of Communists of Yugoslavia]. Borba (in Serbo-Croatian). Socialist Alliance of Working People: 1. 20 December 1978.
- "Централни комитет Савеза комуниста Југославије" [Central Committee of the League of Communists of Yugoslavia]. Borba (in Serbo-Croatian). Socialist Alliance of Working People: 8. 24 June 1978.

=== Thesis ===
- Papović, Dragutin (2013). Intelektualci i vlast u Crnoj Gori 1945–1990 [Intellectuals and the Government in Montenegro 1945–1990] (Thesis) (in Montenegrin). Faculty of Philosophy of the University of Montenegro.

=== Webpages ===
- "Umrl Josip Vrhovec" [Josip Vrhovec dies] (in Slovenian). 24UR. 15 February 2006.
- "General Mirko Vranić, mlinara starog sin" [General Mirko Vranić, the miller's old son] (in Bosnian). Al Jazeera Balkans. 14 January 2018.
- "V spomin: Miha Ravnik (1938 – 2021)" [In memory: Miha Ravnik (1938 – 2021)] (in Slovenian). Association of Free Trade Unions of Slovenia. 12 February 2021.
- "Preminio Boško Krunić" [The death of Boško Krunić] (in Bosnian). B92. 23 January 2017.
- "Познати грађани општине Бачка Паланка – Душан Алимпић" [Famous citizens of Bačka Palanka – Dušan Alimpić]. Bačka Palanka News (in Serbian). 25 April 2023.
- Bajić, Predrag (9 May 2020). "Човек који је објавио крај Другог светског рата у Европи" [The Man Who Announced the End of World War II in Europe] (in Serbian). Museum of Vojvodina.
- "Preminuo Franjo Herljevic" [Franjo Herljević has died]. Borba (in Croatian). 6 May 1998.
- "Godišnjica smrti Ante Sučića, gradonačelnika za čijeg mandata smo dobili Olimpijadu" [Anniversary of the death of Ante Sučić, the mayor whose mandate we won the Olympics Anniversary] (in Bosnian). City Administration of Sarajevo. 27 January 2022.
- "Janjatović, Bosiljka" [Janjatović, Bosiljka]. Croatian Encyclopedia (in Croatian). Miroslav Krleža Institute of Lexicography. 2021.
- "Abduli, Ramiz" [Abduli, Ramiz]. Croatian Technical Encyclopedia (in Croatian). Miroslav Krleža Institute of Lexicography. 16 December 2015.
- "Umrl je France Popit (1921-2013)" [France Popit died (1921-2013)]. Delo (in Slovenian). 28 January 2013.
- "Проф. д-р Бранко Трпеновски" [Prof. Branko Trpenovski] (in Macedonian). Institute of Mathematics of the Ss. Cyril and Methodius University of Skopje. 2015.
- "U 94 Godini: Umro je Pavle Gaži, jedan od tvoraca Podravke i najvećih enigmi socijalističke Hrvatske" [At the Age of 94: Pavle Gaži, one of the creators of Podravka and the greatest enigmas of socialist Croatia, has died]. Jutarnji list. 18 February 2021.
- "Љубиша Вагнер (1937-2021)" [Ljubiša Vagner (1937-2021)] (PDF). Kolektiv (in Serbian). 29 November 2021. Archived from the original (PDF) on 31 May 2023.
- Kos, Miroslav (5 October 2020). "Sećanje Na Milana Daljevića: Odlazak Jednog Od Poslednjih Prvoboraca I Jugoslovenskih Generala" [Remembering Milan Daljević: The departure of one of the last first fighters and Yugoslav generals]. Blic.
- "Memorial Mijat Šuković (1930–2011)". Montenegrin Academy of Sciences and Arts. 2015.
- "Memorial Mirčeta Đurović (1924–2011)". Montenegrin Academy of Sciences and Arts. 2014.
- "Pojedinci od ugleda i autoriteta (V dio)" [Individuals of Reputation and Authority (Part V)]. Novine Nikšića (in Montenegrin). 19 January 2019.
- "Lepej, Stanislav" [Lepej, Stanislav] (in Slovenian). Obrazi slovenskih pokrajin. 19 December 2016.
- Partos, Gabriel (18 April 2006). "Mahmut Bakalli". The Independent.
- "Умро Петар Стамболић" [Petar Stambolić died]. Politika (in Serbian). 22 September 2007.
- "Preminuo Marko Orlandić" [Marko Orlandić passed away] (in Serbian). Radio Television of Serbia. 20 December 2019.
- "Времеплов (6. јануар 2012)" [Time machine (6 January 2012)] (in Serbian). Radio Television of Serbia. 6 January 2012.
- "На Денешен Ден Во Тиквешијата" [Today In Tikveshia] (in Macedonian). RTK.mk. 2014.
- "Branko Mikulic: A Man who refused all Calls to leave besieged Sarajevo". Sarajevo TImes. 1 April 2022.
- "Zidar, Milovan (1931–2024)" [Zidar, Milovan (1931–2024)] (in Slovenian). Slovenska biografija of the Slovenian Academy of Sciences and Arts. 2025.
- "Milorad Đorđija Roganović" [Milorad Đorđija Roganović] (in Montenegrin). Umrli.me. 2016.
- "Preminuo Nandor Major" [Nandor Major passed away] (in Serbian). Vajma. 22 November 2022.
- "Meghalt Đorđe Stojšić" [Đorđe Stojšić died] (in Hungarian). Vajma. 8 August 2014.
- "Преминула Вукосава Мићуновић, последња жена народни херој" [Vukosava Mićunović, the last woman national hero]. Večernje novosti (in Serbian). 25 February 2016.
- "Umirovljeni General Zbora Anton Tus" [Retired General of the Choir Anton Tus]. Večernji list (in Croatian). 1 December 2016.
- "Sahranjen Lazar Mojsov" [Lazar Mojsov buried]. Večernje novosti (in Serbian). 25 August 2011.
- Xharra, Fahri (1 January 2021). "Çka kërkonte Drazha Markoviqi në zyrën e Veli Devës në Trepçë?" [What was Drada Marković looking for in Veli Deva's office in Trepça?]. Bota Sot (in Albanian).
- Xharra, Fahri (22 September 2019). "Vremeplov (22. septembar 2019)" [Time machine (22 September 2019)] (in Albanian). Radio Television of Serbia.
- "Ndërron jetë Ilaz Kurteshi, një nga hartuesit e Kushtetutës së vitit 1974" [Iljaz Kurteši, one of the drafters of the 1974 Constitution, died] (in Albanian). Zeri.info. 13 February 2016.
- Flickr album Photos and small abstracts of the main events.
