= Central Committee of the 12th Congress of the League of Communists of Yugoslavia =

12th Central Committee
- Emblem of the League of Communists of Yugoslavia

29 June 1982 – 25 June 1986 (3 years, 361 days) Overview
- Type: Highest organ
- Election: 12th Congress

Members
- Total: 180 members
- Newcomers: 94 members (12th)
- Old: 64 members (11th)
- Reelected: 45 members (13th)
- By-elected: 16 individuals

This electoral term of the Central Committee was elected by the 12th Congress of the League of Communists of Yugoslavia in 1982, and was in session until the convocation of the 13th Congress in 1986.

== Composition ==
Members of the Central Committee of the 12th Congress of the League of Communists of Yugoslavia
Name	11th	13th	Birth	PM	Death	Branch	Nationality	Gender	Ref.
Ramiz Abduli	Old	Not	1928	1946	1996	Yugoslav People's Army	Albanian	Male	
Roman Albreht	Return	Not	1921	1945	2006	Slovenia	Slovene	Male	
Dušan Alimpić	Old	Not	1921	1941	2002	Vojvodina	Serb	Male	
Mato Andrić	CC	Elected	1928	1945	2015	Bosnia-Herzegovina	Croat	Male	
Sahin Arif	New	Not	1937	1960	?	Macedonia	Turkic	Male	
Krste Atanasovski	New	Not	1943	1972	?	Macedonia	Macedonian	Male	
Milorad Babić	New	Not	1926	1948	?	Montenegro	Montenegrin	Male	
Vladimir Bakarić	Old	Not	1912	1933	1983	Croatia	Croat	Male	
Eržebet Balažević	New	Not	1951	1972	Alive	Vojvodina	Hungarian	Female	
Milutin Baltić	Return	Not	1920	1940	2013	Croatia	Serb	Male	
Dimče Belovski	New	Not	1923	1943	2010	Macedonia	Macedonian	Male	
Pal Benak	New	Not	1947	1964	Alive	Vojvodina	Hungarian	Male	
Jure Bilić	Return	Not	1922	1941	2006	Croatia	Croat	Male	
Jakov Blažević	Return	Not	1912	1928	1996	Croatia	Croat	Male	
Dušan Bogdanov	New	Not	1921	1944	?	Vojvodina	Serb	Male	
Slobodan Bojanić	New	Not	1934	1951	2021	Serbia	Serb	Male	
Lojze Briški	New	Not	1927	1944	2001	Slovenia	Slovene	Male	
Nevena Bubanja	New	Not	1942	1965	?	Serbia	Serb	Female	
Marinko Bulatović	New	Not	1928	1948	2002?	Montenegro	Montenegrin	Male	
Vera Bunteska	New	Not	1943	1968	Alive	Macedonia	Macedonian	Female	
Angel Čemerski	Old	Not	1923	1942	2003	Macedonia	Macedonian	Male	
Jože Ciuha	New	Not	1924	1948	2015	Slovenia	Slovene	Male	
Dušan Čkrebić	New	Elected	1927	1945	2022	Serbia	Serb	Male	
Dane Ćuić	Old	Not	1923	1942	1988	Yugoslav People's Army	Serb	Male	
Dobroslav Ćulafić	Return	Not	1926	1944	2011	Montenegro	Montenegrin	Male	
Fadilj Ćuranoli	New	Not	1926	1945	?	Kosovo	Albanian	Male	
Marijan Cvetković	Return	Not	1920	1938	1990	Croatia	Croat	Male	
Boro Denkov	New	Not	1937	1966	2017	Macedonia	Macedonian	Male	
Velli Deva	Old	Not	1923	1942	2015	Kosovo	Albanian	Male	
Stojan Dimovski	New	Not	1933	1952	?	Macedonia	Macedonian	Male	
Nijaz Dizdarević	Old	Not	1920	1942	1989	Bosnia-Herzegovina	Muslim	Male	
Raif Dizdarević	CC	Elected	1926	1945	2026	Bosnia-Herzegovina	Muslim	Male	
Lazar Đođić	CC	Not	1936	1956	2016	Montenegro	Montenegrin	Male	
Stane Dolanc	Old	Elected	1925	1944	1999	Slovenia	Slovene	Male	
Svetislav Dolašević	CC	Elected	1926	1945	1995	Kosovo	Serb	Male	
Zvone Dragan	Old	Not	1939	1958	Alive	Slovenia	Slovene	Male	
Dušan Dragosavac	Old	Elected	1919	1942	2014	Croatia	Serb	Male	
Milojko Drulović	Old	Not	1923	1941	1989	Serbia	Serb	Male	
Rato Dugonjić	Old	Not	1916	1937	1987	Bosnia-Herzegovina	Serb	Male	
Veselin Đuranović	CC	Not	1925	1944	1997	Montenegro	Montenegrin	Male	
Predrag Đurić	New	Not	1924	1942	?	Yugoslav People's Army	Serb	Male	
Marko Đuričin	New	Not	1925	1948	2013	Vojvodina	Serb	Male	
Milan Džajkovski	New	Not	1934	1955	?	Macedonia	Macedonian	Male	
Ivo Fabinc	New	Not	1918	1951	2010	Slovenia	Slovene	Male	
Marko Filipović	New	Not	1933	1953	?	Croatia	Croat	Male	
Nikica Franović	New	Not	1937	1957	?	Montenegro	Montenegrin	Male	
Spiro Galović	New	Not	1938	1956	2014	Serbia	Serb	Male	
Majda Gaspari	New	Not	1929	1946	2020	Slovenia	Slovene	Female	
Dušan Gligorijević	Old	Not	1920	1941	2008	Serbia	Serb	Male	
Stanka Glomazić-Leković	New	Not	1924	1941	2020	Montenegro	Montenegrin	Female	
Vesela Gogova	Old	Not	1923	1961	?	Macedonia	Macedonian	Female	
Petar Gračanin	Old	Not	1923	1942	2004	Yugoslav People's Army	Serb	Male	
Aleksandar Grličkov	Old	Not	1923	1943	1989	Macedonia	Macedonian	Male	
Kiro Hadživasilev	Old	Not	1921	1943	2000	Macedonia	Macedonian	Male	
Sinan Hasani	Old	Elected	1922	1942	2010	Kosovo	Albanian	Male	
Franjo Herljević	Old	Not	1915	1940	1998	Bosnia-Herzegovina	Croat	Male	
Sanije Hiseni	New	Not	1957	1976	Alive	Kosovo	Albanian	Female	
Ivan Hočevar	New	Not	1933	1951	2021	Slovenia	Slovene	Male	
Fadilj Hodža	Old	Not	1916	1936	2001	Kosovo	Albanian	Male	
Ljubiša Igić	New	Not	1941	1958	2023	Serbia	Serb	Male	
Trpe Jakovlevski	Old	Not	1925	1944	2005	Macedonia	Macedonian	Male	
Petar Jakšić	New	Not	1934	1953	?	Kosovo	Montenegrin	Male	
Slavojka Janković	New	Not	1937	1961	2018	Bosnia-Herzegovina	Serb	Female	
Vlado Janžič	New	Not	1936	1956	2016	Slovenia	Slovene	Male	
Georgije Jovičić	New	Not	1927	1943	2011	Yugoslav People's Army	Montenegrin	Male	
Ivo Karamarko	CC	Elected	1945	?	Alive	Croatia	Croat	Male	
Šaban Kevrić	New	Not	1949	1967	?	Bosnia-Herzegovina	Muslim	Male	
Nikola Kmezić	New	Not	1919	1940	2009	Vojvodina	Serb	Male	
Rudi Kolak	Old	Elected	1918	1940	2004	Bosnia-Herzegovina	Croat	Male	
Lazar Koliševski	Old	Not	1914	1935	2000	Macedonia	Macedonian	Male	
Kemal Korajlić	New	Not	1928	1944	2000	Yugoslav People's Army	Muslim	Male	
Dragutin Kosovac	Old	Elected	1924	1941	2012	Bosnia-Herzegovina	Serb	Male	
Đorđe Kostić	Old	Not	1921	1946	?	Serbia	Serb	Male	
Sergej Kraigher	Old	Elected	1914	1934	2001	Slovenia	Slovene	Male	
Anica Kristan	New	Not	1934	1959	Alive	Slovenia	Slovene	Female	
Boško Krunić	Old	Elected	1929	1946	2017	Vojvodina	Serb	Male	
Milan Kučan	New	Elected	1941	1958	Alive	Slovenia	Slovene	Male	
Ivan Kukoč	Old	Not	1918	1935	2005	Croatia	Croat	Male	
Iljaz Kurteši	CC	Not	1927	1949	2016	Kosovo	Albanian	Male	
Todo Kurtović	Old	Not	1919	1941	1997	Bosnia-Herzegovina	Serb	Male	
Đorđe Lazović	New	Not	1952	1975	Alive	Montenegro	Montenegrin	Male	
Nikola Ljubičić	Old	Not	1916	1941	2005	Yugoslav People's Army	Serb	Male	
Marko Lolić	New	Elected	1936	1955	?	Croatia	Serb	Male	
Milojko Lučić	New	Not	1945	1972	?	Montenegro	Montenegrin	Male	
Nandor Major	Old	Elected	1931	1952	2022	Vojvodina	Hungarian	Male	
Branko Mamula	Old	Elected	1921	1942	2021	Yugoslav People's Army	Serb	Male	
Živko Marčeta	New	Not	1934	1952	?	Vojvodina	Serb	Male	
Slavko Marićević	New	Not	1926	1942	2015	Yugoslav People's Army	Montenegrin	Male	
Andrej Marinc	Old	Not	1930	1947	2025	Slovenia	Slovene	Male	
Dragoslav Marković	New	Not	1920	1939	2005	Serbia	Serb	Male	
Krste Markovski	New	Elected	1925	1941	?	Macedonia	Macedonian	Male	
Petar Matić	Old	Elected	1920	1940	2024	Yugoslav People's Army	Serb	Male	
Rudolf Matošević	New	Not	1933	1952	?	Croatia	Croat	Male	
Ahmet Mehović	New	Elected	1950	1974	Alive	Montenegro	Muslim	Male	
Munir Mesihović	Old	Elected	1928	1946	2016	Bosnia-Herzegovina	Muslim	Male	
Fatima Midžić	New	Not	1929	1949	?	Bosnia-Herzegovina	Muslim	Female	
Niko Mihaljević	New	Not	1920	1941	?	Bosnia-Herzegovina	Croat	Male	
Cvijetin Mijatović	Old	Not	1913	1933	1993	Bosnia-Herzegovina	Serb	Male	
Branko Mikulić	Old	Elected	1928	1945	1994	Bosnia-Herzegovina	Croat	Male	
Obren Milačić	New	Not	1925	1944	2011	Montenegro	Montenegrin	Male	
Slavka Miladinović	New	Not	1943	1959	1987	Serbia	Serb	Female	
Veljko Milatović	New	Not	1921	1940	2004	Montenegro	Montenegrin	Male	
Luka Miletić	New	Not	1939	1960	?	Croatia	Croat	Male	
Smiljka Milojević	New	Not	1941	1960	?	Bosnia-Herzegovina	Croat	Female	
Slobodan Milošević	New	Elected	1941	1959	2006	Serbia	Serb	Male	
Miloš Minić	Old	Not	1914	1936	2003	Serbia	Serb	Male	
Lazar Mojsov	Old	Elected	1920	1940	2011	Macedonia	Macedonian	Male	
Veselj Morina	New	Not	1936	1960	?	Kosovo	Albanian	Male	
Boris Muževič	New	Elected	1949	1968	2025	Slovenia	Slovene	Male	
Bogoljub Nedeljković	Old	Died	1920	1942	1986	Kosovo	Serb	Male	
Marko Orlandić	CC	Elected	1930	1948	2019	Montenegro	Montenegrin	Male	
Mirko Ostojić	Old	Not	1923	1941	?	Bosnia-Herzegovina	Serb	Male	
Milan Pančevski	CC	Elected	1935	1957	2019	Macedonia	Macedonian	Male	
Najdan Pašić	New	Not	1922	1945	1997	Serbia	Serb	Male	
Milan Pavić	Old	Not	1942	1959	2011	Croatia	Serb	Male	
Ivo Perišin	Old	Not	1925	1941	2008	Croatia	Croat	Male	
Dragoljub Petrović	New	Not	1919	1941	1994	Serbia	Montenegrin	Male	
Milka Planinc	Old	Elected	1924	1944	2010	Croatia	Croat	Female	
France Popit	Old	Not	1921	1940	2013	Slovenia	Slovene	Male	
Dušan Popović	Old	Not	1921	1944	2014	Vojvodina	Serb	Male	
Mihajlo Popović	New	Not	1932	1951	?	Montenegro	Montenegrin	Male	
Miran Potrč	New	Not	1938	1962	2023	Slovenia	Slovene	Male	
Hamdija Pozderac	Old	Elected	1924	1943	1988	Bosnia-Herzegovina	Muslim	Male	
Radenko Puzović	New	Not	1933	1951	?	Serbia	Serb	Male	
Ivica Račan	New	Elected	1944	1959	2007	Croatia	Croat	Male	
Ilija Radaković	New	Not	1923	1941	2015	Yugoslav People's Army	Serb	Male	
Miljan Radović	New	Not	1933	1951	2015	Montenegro	Montenegrin	Male	
Mićo Rakić	New	Not	1922	1941	2007	Bosnia-Herzegovina	Serb	Male	
Hisen Ramadani	Old	Not	1933	1954	2012	Macedonia	Albanian	Male	
Nikola Ražnatović	New	Not	1935	1958	?	Montenegro	Montenegrin	Male	
Mitja Ribičič	Return	Not	1919	1941	2013	Slovenia	Slovene	Male	
Marjan Rožič	New	Not	1932	1949	2017	Slovenia	Slovene	Male	
Alenko Rubeša	New	Not	1949	1966	Alive	Croatia	Croat	Male	
Zorka Sekulović	New	Elected	1938	1961	?	Montenegro	Montenegrin	Female	
Ali Šukrija	Old	Elected	1919	1939	2005	Kosovo	Albanian	Male	
Boško Šiljegović	Old	Not	1915	1940	1990	Bosnia-Herzegovina	Serb	Male	
Boro Simić	New	Not	1936	1958	?	Kosovo	Serb	Male	
Kolj Široka	Old	Elected	1922	1941	1994	Kosovo	Albanian	Male	
Jakov Sirotković	New	Not	1922	1943	2002	Croatia	Croat	Male	
Janko Smole	Old	Not	1921	1944	2010	Slovenia	Slovene	Male	
Drago Šofranac	New	Elected	1942	1964	?	Montenegro	Montenegrin	Male	
Mika Špiljak	Old	Not	1916	1938	2007	Croatia	Croat	Male	
Aleksandar Spirkovski	New	Not	1932	1951	2011	Yugoslav People's Army	Macedonian	Male	
Vojislav Srzentić	Old	Not	1934	1952	Alive	Montenegro	Montenegrin	Male	
Ivan Stambolić	CC	Not	1936	1954	2000	Serbia	Serb	Male	
Petar Stambolić	Old	Not	1912	1933	2007	Serbia	Serb	Male	
Metodije Stefanovski	New	Not	1926	1944	Alive	Yugoslav People's Army	Macedonian	Male	
Nikola Stojanović	Old	Elected	1933	1952	2020	Bosnia-Herzegovina	Serb	Male	
Stanislav Stojanović	New	Elected	1937	1958	?	Serbia	Serb	Male	
Svetislav Stojakov	CC	Not	1936	?	?	Vojvodina	Serb	Male	
Stanko Stojčević	CC	Elected	1929	1944	2009	Croatia	Serb	Male	
Stojan Stojčevski	New	Not	1931	1948	?	Macedonia	Macedonian	Male	
Đorđe Stojšić	CC	Elected	1928	1945	2014	Vojvodina	Serb	Male	
Vlado Strugar	New	Not	1922	1940	2019	Montenegro	Montenegrin	Male	
Taip Taipi	New	Elected	1924	1944	2001	Macedonia	Albanian	Male	
Arif Tanović	New	Not	1925	1943	2010	Bosnia-Herzegovina	Muslim	Male	
Branko Trpenovski	Old	Not	1934	1952	2005	Macedonia	Macedonian	Male	
Igor Uršić	New	Not	1943	1960	?	Slovenia	Slovene	Male	
Uglješa Uzelac	CC	Elected	1938	?	1997	Bosnia-Herzegovina	Muslim	Male	
Ilija Vakić	New	Not	1932	1949	2023	Kosovo	Serb	Male	
Danilo Vasić	New	Not	1923	1943	?	Kosovo	Serb	Male	
Živan Vasiljević	Old	Not	1920	1941	2007	Serbia	Serb	Male	
Dušan Veljković	New	Not	1934	1956	?	Macedonia	Macedonian	Male	
Andrej Verbič	New	Not	1920	1942	1999	Slovenia	Slovene	Male	
Slavko Veselinov	CC	Not	1925	1944	1997	Vojvodina	Serb	Male	
Dobrivoje Vidić	Old	Elected	1918	1939	1992	Serbia	Serb	Male	
Tihomir Vilović	New	Not	1924	1943	2008	Yugoslav People's Army	Croat	Male	
Radovan Vlajković	Old	Elected	1922	1943	2001	Vojvodina	Serb	Male	
Azem Vllasi	New	Elected	1948	1965	Alive	Kosovo	Albanian	Male	
Tihomir Vlaškalić	Old	Not	1923	1945	1993	Serbia	Serb	Male	
Anton Vratuša	New	Not	1915	1943	2017	Slovenia	Slovene	Male	
Josip Vrhovec	Old	Elected	1926	1944	2006	Croatia	Croat	Male	
Vuko Vukadinović	New	Not	1937	1956	1993	Montenegro	Montenegrin	Male	
Bosko Vukov	New	Not	1919	1946	?	Vojvodina	Serb	Male	
Miodrag Vuković	New	Not	1955	1972	2022	Montenegro	Montenegrin	Male	
Bruno Vuletić	Old	Not	1924	1942	1997	Yugoslav People's Army	Croat	Male	
Vidoje Žarković	Old	Elected	1927	1943	2000	Montenegro	Montenegrin	Male	
Janez Zemljarič	CC	Elected	1928	1944	2022	Slovenia	Slovene	Male	
Anton Zupančič	New	Not	1927	1944	2003	Yugoslav People's Army	Slovene	Male	
Silvija Žugić–Rijavec	New	Not	1956	1973	?	Vojvodina	Slovak	Female	

== Bibliography ==
=== Books ===
- League of Communists of Croatia (1978). "Osmi kongres Savez komunista Hrvatske" [8th Congress of the League of Communists of Croatia]. Stenografske bilješke. 4 (8). League of Communists of Croatia.
- Djokić, Dejan (2023). A Concise History of Serbia. Cambridge University Press. ISBN 978-1-107-02838-8.
- Hetemi, Atdhe (2020). Student Movements for the Republic of Kosovo: 1968, 1981 and 1997. Springer International Publishing. ISBN 978-3-030-54951-0.
- Lewytzkyj, Borys; Stroynowski, Juliusz, eds. (1978). Who's Who in the Socialist Countries. K. G. Saur Verlag. ISBN 3-7940-3017-6.
- Marković, Dragan; Kržavac, Savo (1985). Zašto su smenjivani [Why Were They Replaced?] (in Serbo-Croatian). Partizanska knj.
- McFarlane, Bruce J. (1988). Yugoslavia: Politics, Economics, and Society. Pinter Publishers. ISBN 9780861874521.
- Plut-Pregelj, Leopoldina; Kranjc, Gregor; Lazarević, Žarko; Rogel, Carole (2018). Historical Dictionary of Slovenia. Rowman & Littlefield Publishers. ISBN 9781538111062.
- Ristovski, Blazé (2009). Македонска енциклопедија [Macedonian Encyclopedia] (in Macedonian). Macedonian Academy of Sciences and Arts. ISBN 978-608-203-023-4. OCLC 499142958.
- Schneider, Henrique (2016). Indifferenz, Gegnerschaft, Identität Veränderungen im politischen Verhältnis von Dorf und Staat im Kosovo [Indifference, Opposition, Identity Changes in the Political Relationship Between Village and State in Kosovo] (in German). BWV Berliner Wissenschafts-Verlag. ISBN 978-3-8305-3717-5.
- Rajović, Radošin, ed. (1970). Jugoslovenski savremenici: Ko je ko u Jugoslaviji [Yugoslav Contemporaries: Who's Who in Yugoslavia] (in Serbo-Croatian). Hronometar.
- Staff writer (1990). Directory of Yugoslav officials: A Reference Aid. Reference aid. University of Michigan. Archived from the original on 11 June 2023.
- Stanković, Slobodan (1981). Staar, Richard F. (ed.). The End of the Tito Era: Yugoslavia's Dilemmas. Hoover International Studies. Hoover Institution Press. ISBN 9780817973629.
- Stroynowski, Juliusz, ed. (1989a). Who's Who in the Socialist Countries of Europe: A–H. K. G. Saur Verlag. ISBN 3-598-10719-6.
- Stroynowski, Juliusz, ed. (1989b). Who's Who in the Socialist Countries of Europe: I–O. K. G. Saur Verlag. ISBN 3-598-10719-6.
- Stroynowski, Juliusz, ed. (1989c). Who's Who in the Socialist Countries of Europe: P–Z. K. G. Saur Verlag. ISBN 3-598-10719-6.

=== Journals ===
- Krstić, Dejan (2015). "The Old Cemetery in Zaječar: Socio-cultural Reading". Yugoslav Society for the Scientific Study of Religion Annual. XXII (2015). University of Niš: 113–132.
- Kiselinovski, Stojan (2016). "Historical Roots of the Macedonian Language Codification". Studia Środkowoeuropejskie i Bałkanistyczne. XXIV (2016). Polish Academy of Arts and Sciences: 133–146. doi:10.4467/2543733XSSB.16.009.6251.
- Miloradović, Goran (2011). "Глас "ликвидиране генерације": Ауторизовани интервју са филмским редитељем Јованом Јоцом Живановићем" [The voice of the "liquidated generation": Authorised interview with film director Jovan Joco Živanović]. Yearbook of Social History (in Serbian). 17 (2). Institute of Contemporary History: 73–113.
- Novoseltsev, Boris (2009). Югославия и политика неприсоединения в конце 1960-х — начале 1970-х гг. На пути к конференции в Лусаке [Yugoslavia and the Preparations for the Non-Aligned Conference in Lusaka (1970)] (in Russian). Institute for Slavic Studies of the Russian Academy of Sciences.
- Tuntev, Akhil; Janjatov, Dragan; Boychev, Dušan, eds. (2016). "Прилог 1 Преглед На Македонци Кои Извршувале Амбасадорски Функции Во Поранешната Сфрј До Распадот На Федерацијата (По Азбучен Ред)" [Appendix 1: Summary of Macedonians Who Performed Ambassadorial Functions in the Former SFRJ until the Federation's breakup (in alphabetical order)] (PDF). Diplomatic Yearbook. 1 (1): 34–39.

=== Newspaper ===
- Staff writer (21 February 1989). "Novi članovi Predsedništva CK SKJ" [New members of the Presidency of the CC LCY]. Borba (in Serbo-Croatian). Socialist Alliance of Working People: 1.
- Staff writer (23 May 1985). "Лазар Ђођаћ предеединк" [Lazar Đođać President]. Borba (in Serbo-Croatian). Socialist Alliance of Working People: 1.
- Staff writer (28 April 1984). "Светислав Долашевићп редседник" [Svetislav Dolašević President]. Borba (in Serbo-Croatian). Socialist Alliance of Working People: 1.
- Staff writer (30 June 1982). "Централни комитет Савеза комуниста Југославије" [Central Committee of the League of Communists of Yugoslavia]. Borba (in Serbo-Croatian). Socialist Alliance of Working People: 6.
- "Централни комитет Савеза комуниста Југославије" [Central Committee of the League of Communists of Yugoslavia]. Borba (in Serbo-Croatian). Socialist Alliance of Working People: 6. 30 June 1982.
- "Централни комитет Савеза комуниста Југославије" [Central Committee of the League of Communists of Yugoslavia]. Borba (in Serbo-Croatian). Socialist Alliance of Working People: 8. 24 June 1978.

=== Thesis ===
- Papović, Dragutin (2013). Intelektualci i vlast u Crnoj Gori 1945–1990 [Intellectuals and the Government in Montenegro 1945–1990] (Thesis) (in Montenegrin). Faculty of Philosophy of the University of Montenegro.

=== Websites ===
- "Preminuo Dušan Čkrebić" [Dušan Čkrebić passed away] (in Bosnian). Banjaluka.net. 8 April 2022.
- "Abduli, Ramiz" [Abduli, Ramiz]. Croatian Technical Encyclopedia (in Croatian). Miroslav Krleža Institute of Lexicography. 16 December 2015.
- Ribičič, Ciril (30 March 2023). "In memoriam: Miran Potrč (1938–2023)" [In memoriam: Miran Potrč (1938–2023)]. Dnevnik (in Slovenian).
- "V 92. letu starosti je umrl nekdanji rektor ljubljanske univerze Ivo Fabinc" [At the age of 92, the former rector of the University of Ljubljana, Ivo Fabinc, died]. Dnevnik (in Slovenian). 26 February 2010.
- "Godišnjica smrti Uglješe Uzelca" [Anniversary of the death of Ugljaša Uzelac] (in Bosnian). Historija.ba. 6 September 1997.
- "Autorski tekstovi" [Author's texts]. Medical (in Montenegrin). 14 March 2023.
- "Preminuo Miodrag Vuković" [Miodrag Vuković passed away]. Nezavisni dnevnik Vijesti (in Montenegrin). 15 September 2022.
- Bartolović, Sandra (30 April 2007). "Ivica Račan 1944-2007" [Ivica Račan 1944-2007]. Poslovni dnevnik (in Serbian).
- Xharra, Fahri (22 September 2019). "Vremeplov (22. septembar 2019)" [Time machine (September 22, 2019)] (in Albanian). Radio Television of Serbia.
- "Umrl je general Ivan Hočevar, ki je maja 1990 razorožil slovensko Teritorialno obrambo" [General Ivan Hočevar died, disarming The Slovenian Territorial Defence in May 1990]. Reporter (in Slovenian). 26 January 2021.
- "Проф. д-р Бранко Трпеновски" [Prof. Branko Trpenovski] (in Macedonian). Institute of Mathematics of the Ss. Cyril and Methodius University of Skopje. 2015.
