= Rrahman Morina =

Yugoslav police officer and communist politician

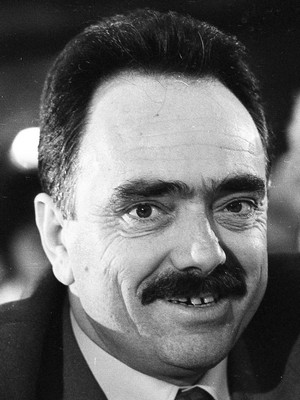

President of the Provincial Committee for Kosovo and Metohija of the Socialist Party of Serbia
- In office 27 January 1989 – 12 October 1990
- Preceded by: Remzi Kolgeci
- Succeeded by: Post abolished (as the League of Communists disbanded)

Personal details
- Born: 1943 Peja, Italian protectorate of Albania
- Died: 12 October 1990 (aged 46–47) Pristina, SR Serbia, SFR Yugoslavia
- Party: Socialist Party of Serbia, League of Communists of Kosovo (until 1990)
- Spouse: Bratislava Buba Banjac-Morina
- Profession: police officer, politician

Rrahman Morina (Serbian: Рахман Морина, romanized: Rahman Morina; 1943 – 12 October 1990) was a Yugoslav police officer and communist politician. As a Kosovo Albanian, he is remembered as being an opponent of Albanian separatism.

== Early career ==
Morina had a career as an agent of the Ministry of Interior of SFR Yugoslavia, and later on as a party official in the League of Communists of Kosovo. He rose through the ranks and was in 1981 appointed as Kosovo's interior minister, and thereby held the top law enforcement office in the province. In March the same year, in the wake of the 1981 riots in Kosovo, he called in the national police to quell the uprising, without informing or consulting the provincial government. This act contributed to the resignation of Kosovan party boss Mahmut Bakalli, as the latter did not prove himself accountable enough in the eyes of the government in Belgrade.

== Leadership in Kosovo ==
In 1988, Morina was installed as leader of the Kosovan wing of the League of Communists of Yugoslavia due to the Anti-bureaucratic revolution in support of the policies of Slobodan Milošević, and the subsequent removal of Azem Vllasi and Kaqusha Jashari from the Kosovan party leadership, as he was one of very few Albanian opponents of Kosovo Albanian separatism.

Morina came to be seen as a loyalist of the Serbian leader Slobodan Milošević, although Milošević originally despised Morina. Years earlier, Milošević approached the Yugoslavian president Lazar Mojsov, furiously demanding Morina's removal from the Kosovan government (and the rest of it). Milošević even threatened to resign from his office as leader of the League of Communists of Serbia, if Morina was not ousted. In 1989 Morina resigned from Kosovo's political structures during the miners' strike.

== Death ==
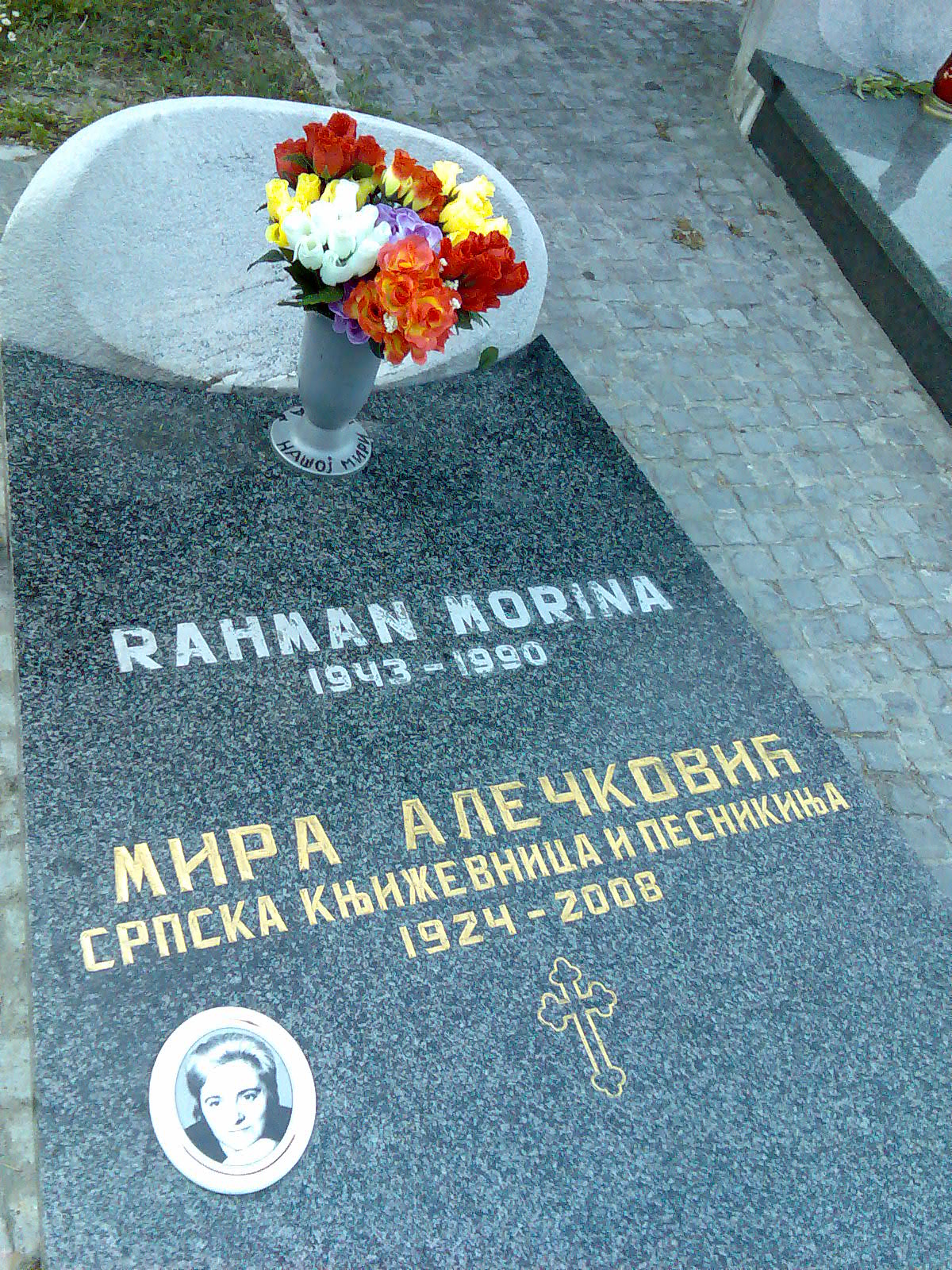
Grave of Morina, Alley of Distinguished Citizens, Belgrade New Cemetery. (Poet Mira Alečković is buried in the same tomb.)

He died in 1990, at the age of 47 after suffering a heart attack in Pristina, while attending the constituent convention of the Kosovan branch of the Socialist Party of Serbia.

== Personal life ==
He was married to Bratislava "Buba" Morina, a Serbian lawyer, government minister, and Commissioner for Refugees of Serbia who died in 2022.

== Bibliography ==
- Raif Dizdarević, Od smrti Tita do smrti Jugoslavije (Sarajevo: Svjetlost, 2000)
- Viktor Meier, Yugoslavia - A History of its Demise (London: Routledge, 1999)
