= President of the League of Communists of Kosovo =

Leader of the League of Communists of Kosovo

- Albanian: Kryetar i Lidhjes së Komunistëve të Kosovës
- Emblems of the LCY
- Type: Party leader
- Member of: LCY Presidency and SAPK Presidency
- Appointer: LKK Provincial Committee
- Term length: Two years, non-renewable (1982–1991)
- Constituting instrument: LCY Charter & LKK Charter
- Formation: 25 July 1937
- First holder: Miladin Popović
- Final holder: Rahman Morina
- Abolished: 17 July 1990

The president was the leader of the League of Communists of Kosovo (LKK), the ruling party of the Socialist Autonomous Province of Kosovo (SAPK) of the Socialist Republic of Serbia in the Socialist Federal Republic of Yugoslavia. The LKK was the provincial organisation of the League of Communists of Serbia (SKS) in Kosovo. Party rules stipulated that the LKK Provincial Committee elected the president. Moreover, the Central Committee was empowered to remove the president. The president served ex officio as a member of the Presidency of the Central Committee of the League of Communists of Yugoslavia (LCY) and of the SAPK Presidency. To be eligible to serve, the president had to be a member of the Executive Committee of the LKK Provincial Committee. The 13th LKK Provincial Conference instituted a one-year term limits for officeholders.

The office traces its lineage back to the office of "Secretary of the Provincial Committee of the League of Communists of Kosovo and Metohija", established on 25 July 1937 and elected Miladin Popović to head the Kosovo branch. This body had no distinct rights and was under the jurisdiction of the Serbian Central Committee. The LCY 6th Congress on 2–7 November 1952, renamed the party League of Communists, and the Kosovo branch followed suit and changed its name to League of Communists of Kosovo. On 4 October 1966, the 5th Plenary Session of the Central Committee of the LCY 8th Congress abolished the office of General Secretary at the national level and replaced with the office of President. The SKS Central Committee convened a meeting in 1966 that abolished the office of secretary and established the "President of the Provincial Committee of the League of Communists of Kosovo". The reforms passed by the LCY Central Committee plenum strengthened the powers of the provincial branches of Kosovo and Vojvodina and gave more powers to the LKK party leader. The 13th LKK Conference introduced another set of reforms on 26 April 1982, which abolished the existing office and replaced it with the "President of the Presidency of the Provincial Committee of the League of Communists of Kosovo". This office was retained until 17 July 1990, when the League of Communists of Serbia changed its name to the "Socialist Party of Serbia".

== Office history ==
Title	Established	Abolished	Established by
Secretary of the Provincial Committee of the League of Communists of Kosovo and Metohija; Albanian: Sekretar i Komitetit Krahinor të Lidhjes së Komunistëve të Kosovës dhe Metohisë	25 July 1937	1966	Central Committee of the 4th Congress of the Communist Party of Yugoslavia
President of the Provincial Committee of the League of Communists of Kosovo; Albanian: Kryetar i Komitetit Krahinor të Lidhjes së Komunistëve të Kosovës	1966	26 April 1982	? Plenary Session of the Central Committee of the 4th Congress
President of the Presidency of the Provincial Committee of the League of Communists of Kosovo; Albanian: Kryetar i Kryesisë së Komitetit Krahinor të Lidhjes së Komunistëve të Kosovës	26 April 1982	17 July 1990	11th Congress of the League of Communists of Macedonia

== Officeholders ==
Presidents of the League of Communists of Kosovo
No.	Name	Took office	Left office	Tenure	Term of office	Birth	PM	Death	Nationality	Ref.
1	Miladin Popović	25 July 1937	December 1937	129 days	1st (1937–1939)	1910	1934	1945	Montenegrin	
2	Petar Radović	December 1937	August 1938	243 days	1st (1937–1939)	1907	1931	1944	Montenegrin	
3	Miladin Popović	September 1939	July 1941	1 year, 303 days	2nd (1939–1945)	1910	1934	1945	Montenegrin	
4	Boro Vukmirović	July 1941	April 1943	1 year, 274 days	2nd (1939–1945)	1912	1933	1943	Montenegrin	
5	Pavle Jovićević	April 1943	15 October 1944	1 year, 197 days	2nd (1939–1945)	1910	1938	1985	Montenegrin	
6	Miladin Popović	15 October 1944	13 March 1945	149 days	2nd (1939–1945)	1910	1934	1945	Montenegrin	
7	Đorđije Pajković	23 March 1945	February 1956	10 years, 315 days	3rd–10th (1945–1956)	1917	1936	1980	Montenegrin	
8	Dušan Mugoša	February 1956	16 June 1956	136 days	10th (1954–1956)	1914	1934	1973	Montenegrin	
9	Veli Deva	16 June 1956	28 June 1971	15 years, 12 days	7th–10th (1956–1974)	1923	1942	2015	Albanian	
10	Mahmut Bakalli	28 June 1971	5 May 1981	9 years, 311 days	10th–12th (1968–1982)	1936	1957	2006	Albanian	
11	Veli Deva	5 May 1981	26 April 1982	356 days	12th (1978–1982)	1923	1942	2015	Albanian	
12	Sinan Hasani	26 April 1982	May 1983	1 year, 5 days	13th (1982–1986)	1922	1942	2010	Albanian	
13	Ilaz Kurteshi	May 1983	27 April 1984	362 days	13th (1982–1986)	1927	1949	2016	Albanian	
14	Svetislav Dolašević	27 April 1984	May 1985	1 year, 4 days	13th (1982–1986)	1926	1945	1995	Serb	
15	Kolë Shiroka	May 1985	29 April 1986	363 days	13th (1982–1986)	1922	1941	1994	Albanian	
16	Azem Vllasi	29 April 1986	27 April 1988	1 year, 364 days	14th (1986–1989)	1948	1965	Alive	Albanian	
17	Kaqusha Jashari	27 April 1988	17 November 1988	204 days	14th (1986–1989)	1946	1975	2025	Albanian	
18	Remzi Kolgeci	17 November 1988	27 January 1989	71 days	14th (1986–1989)	1947	?	2011	Albanian	
19	Rahman Morina	27 January 1989	17 July 1990	1 year, 171 days	15th (1989–1990)	1943	1969	1990	Albanian	

== Bibliography ==
- Elsie, Robert (2011). Historical Dictionary of Kosovo. Scarecrow Press. ISBN 9780810874831.
- Lewytzkyj, Borys; Stroynowski, Juliusz, eds. (1978). Who's Who in the Socialist Countries. K. G. Saur Verlag. ISBN 3-7940-3017-6.
- Štěpánek, Václav (2016). Jugoslávie – Srbsko – Kosovo: Kosovská otázka ve 20. století [Yugoslavia–Serbia–Kosovo: The Kosovo Question in the 20th Century] (in Czech). Masarykova univerzita. ISBN 9788021082113.
- Stroynowski, Juliusz, ed. (1989a). Who's Who in the Socialist Countries of Europe: A–H. K. G. Saur Verlag. ISBN 3-598-10719-6.
- Stroynowski, Juliusz, ed. (1989b). Who's Who in the Socialist Countries of Europe: I–O. K. G. Saur Verlag. ISBN 3-598-10719-6.
- Stroynowski, Juliusz, ed. (1989c). Who's Who in the Socialist Countries of Europe: P–Z. K. G. Saur Verlag. ISBN 3-598-10719-6.
- Tadić, Aleksandar (1968). Pali za lepša svitanja: Majke heroja pričaju [Lights For More Beautiful dawns: Mothers of Heroes Talk] (in Serbo-Croatian). Međunarodna štampa-Interpress.
- Tito, Josip Broz (1977a). Damjanović, Pero; Vujošević, Ubavka (eds.). Sabrana djela [Selected Works] (in Serbo-Croatian). Vol. 10. Komunist.
- Tito, Josip Broz (1982a). Damjanović, Pero; Vujošević, Ubavka (eds.). Sabrana djela [Selected Works] (in Serbo-Croatian). Vol. 4. Komunist.
- Tito, Josip Broz (1982b). Damjanović, Pero; Vujošević, Ubavka (eds.). Sabrana djela [Selected Works] (in Serbo-Croatian). Vol. 13. Komunist.
- Tito, Josip Broz (1982c). Damjanović, Pero; Vujošević, Ubavka (eds.). Sabrana djela [Selected Works] (in Serbo-Croatian). Vol. 23. Komunist.
- Tito, Josip Broz (1984). Damjanović, Pero; Vujošević, Ubavka (eds.). Sabrana djela [Selected Works] (in Serbo-Croatian). Vol. 17. Komunist.
- Vukotić, Jovo (1972). Druga proleterska divizija [The Second Proletarian Division] (in Serbo-Croatian). Vojnoizdavčki zavod.
