= Serbian Revolution (disambiguation) =

The Serbian Revolution was a national uprising that led to the independence of Serbia from the Ottoman Empire. "Serbian Revolution" may also refer to:

- The Anti-bureaucratic revolution
- The Log Revolution
- The Overthrow of Slobodan Milošević
