= 1989 Kosovo miners' strike =

The 1989 Kosovo miners' strike was a hunger strike initiated by the workers of the Trepča Mines on 20 February 1989 against the abolition of the autonomy of the Province of Kosovo by the Socialist Republic of Serbia. The strike quickly gained support in Slovenia and Croatia, while in Belgrade protests were held against the Slovenian, Albanian and Croatian leaderships. It eventually ended after the hospitalization of 180 miners and the resignation of the leaders of the League of Communists of Kosovo Rahman Morina, Ali Shukriu and Husamedin Azemi.

== Background ==
SFR Yugoslavia was a federal republic consisting of republics including SR Serbia, which in turn had two autonomous provinces, SAP Vojvodina and SAP Kosovo. Kosovo was inhabited mostly by Kosovo Albanians and the 1974 Yugoslav Constitution gave Kosovo a then-unprecedented level of autonomy, but after Josip Broz Tito's death in 1980, Kosovo's autonomy began to be questioned by Serbian politicians.

Following the 1981 riots in Kosovo, which the League of Communists of Kosovo declared to be a product of Albanian nationalism, Serbia reacted by a desire to reduce the power of the Albanians in the province, and promoted a campaign claiming that Serbs were being pushed out of the province primarily by the growing Albanian population and not the state of the economy. In November 1988, 2,000 Albanian miners protested for the preservation of autonomy by marching from the southern mines to Kosovo's capital Pristina with support from another 6,000 other citizens along the way.

== 1989 strikes ==
The League of Communists of Serbia under Slobodan Milošević engaged in a process of replacement of provincial leaders known as the "anti-bureaucratic revolution", whereby the local politicians were overthrown and replaced by Milošević loyalists. As the National Assembly of Serbia was preparing constitutional changes that would have formally reduced the level of provincial autonomy, about 1,350 Trepča miners began their underground hunger strike on 20 February 1989 with similar demands about the preservation of the region's autonomous status and the resignation of pro-Milošević politicians of Kosovo. After the announcement of the strike Linda Abrashi, daughter of the head of the mines contacted journalist Goran Milić, who set up interviews with the workers in the underground mines. As Milić considered the broadcast of the interviews by Belgrade TV unlikely, he managed to broadcast them with the assistance of another journalist Bane Vukašinović, who at that time was located in Skopje. After the broadcast, the heads of Belgrade TV ordered Milić to return to Belgrade and the miners' strike report was his last one from Kosovo.

In Belgrade, media and Serbian politicians accused Azem Vllasi, a provincial leader of the League of Communists, as the instigator of the strikes, although he denied any involvement in the events. Milošević prepared a plan that would allow him to send police reinforcements to Kosovo, but his plan didn't have the majority vote needed by the other members of the federal Presidency of Yugoslavia. Stipe Šuvar negotiated with the miners as a representative of the League of Communists of Yugoslavia. After about a week, some 180 miners had been hospitalized.

On the evening of 27 February 1989, Rahman Morina, Ali Shukriu and Husamedin Azemi, heads of the pro-Milošević faction in Kosovo, resigned. Late in the evening, the Presidency of Yugoslavia met and decided on "special measures" for Kosovo that effectively instituted an unrestricted state of emergency.

Only 50 strikers were left, the ones who had barricaded themselves inside the "Stari trg" mine, at 850 m underground. At midnight, the Special Anti-Terrorist Unit descended through the fire escape shafts, as elevators were disabled, and started arresting the strikers.

The aforementioned "special measures" prompted a move of 1,500 federal police troops under Serbian leadership to Kosovo, where they began a campaign of oppression of Kosovo Albanians or re-establishing a civil order.

== Aftermath ==
A day after the end of the strikes the Slovenian Committee for Human Rights and the Slovene Writers' Association held a mass meeting in Cankar Hall, where Serbian interventionism in Kosovo was condemned and support for the strikers was expressed. During the meeting Jožef Školč, head of the Slovene Youth Organization (SYO) compared the situation of the Albanians in Yugoslavia to that of the Jews during WWII, while Milan Kučan, head of the League of Communists of Slovenia labeled the strike as a defense of Yugoslavia. The SYO also introduced a badge based on the star of David with the text Kosovo My Homeland. In response against the Slovenian actions a protest that attracted about a million people was held in Belgrade, while the Association of Writers of Serbia (AWS) broke off its relations with the Slovene Writers' Association. The Belgrade protesters among others requested the cancellation of the resignation of Morina, Shukriu, Azemi and the arrest and execution of Vllasi. In protest the Albanian members of the AWS left the organization and accused the Serbian writers of support to the repression of Albanians.

About a month after the end of the strike the parliament of Kosovo was surrounded by tanks and the Serbian police and the deputies were brought in to vote for the effective revocation of the region's autonomy. Most of the Albanian deputies abstained in order to invalidate the process as a two-thirds majority was required for constitutional amendments, however, the amendments were declared passed. The region's provincial status was not formally abolished as Milošević needed its vote to gain influence in the federal presidency of Yugoslavia.

== See also ==
- Breakup of Yugoslavia
