= 11th Central Committee =

11th Central Committee may refer to:

- Central Committee of the 11th Congress of the Russian Communist Party (Bolsheviks), 1922–1923
- 11th Central Committee of the Bulgarian Communist Party, 1976–1981
- 11th Central Committee of the Chinese Communist Party, 1986–1989
- 11th Central Committee of the Romanian Communist Party, 1974–1979
- 11th Central Committee of the Lao People's Revolutionary Party, 2021–2026
- 11th Central Committee of the Communist Party of Vietnam, 2011–2016
- Central Committee of the 11th Congress of the League of Communists of Yugoslavia, 1978–1982
