= 12th Central Committee =

12th Central Committee may refer to:

- 12th Central Committee of the Chinese Communist Party, 1982–1987
- 12th Central Committee of the Communist Party of Vietnam, 2016–2021
- Central Committee of the 12th Congress of the League of Communists of Yugoslavia, 1982–1986
- Central Committee of the 12th Congress of the Russian Communist Party (Bolsheviks), 1923–1924
