= League of Communists of Kosovo =

League of Communists of Kosovo Savez komunista Kosova Савез комуниста Косова Lidhja e Komunistëve të Kosovës
- Leader: President of the League of Communists of Kosovo
- Founded: 25 July 1937
- Dissolved: 12 October 1990
- Succeeded by: Socialist Party of Serbia; Social Democratic Party of Kosovo
- Headquarters: Pristina, SAP Kosovo, SR Serbia, Yugoslavia
- Ideology: Communism; Marxism–Leninism; Titoism
- Political position: Left-wing to far-left
- Colours: Red

Party flag
- Politics of Kosovo; Political parties; Elections; Kosovo branch of the League of Communists of Yugoslavia

The League of Communists of Kosovo (Serbo-Croatian: Savez komunista Kosova, Савез комуниста Косова, SKK/СКК; Albanian: Lidhja e Komunistëve të Kosovës) was the Kosovo branch of the League of Communists of Yugoslavia, the sole legal party of Yugoslavia from 1945 to 1990.

== History and background ==
Unlike the various factions throughout Yugoslavia which composed the League of Communists of Yugoslavia, the Communist Party of Kosovo was founded on 25 July 1937. The status of an honorary autonomous province was presented to ethnic Albanian communists who helped the Yugoslav partisans in their struggles during World War II, carved out from the section of the former Ottoman province within the Socialist Republic of Serbia (i.e. whilst one chunk of the former province was given to Albania in 1912, the other sections of it were awarded to Yugoslavia's newly created republics: Montenegro and Macedonia). The new party was given the task of running certain local affairs. In 1952, the party was renamed the League of Communists of Kosovo.

From its creation, Kosovo's administration lacked real power. With various revisions of the constitution, the LCK was granted more and more power until when the new constitution was ratified in 1974, greater power was devolved to all branches.

During the early 1980s, growing ethnic tensions between the republics of Yugoslavia led to the breakup of the federal party — the Kosovo Communists wanted to upgrade Kosovo from an autonomous republic within Serbia to the 7th socialist republic of Yugoslavia, with the same status of Croatia, Montenegro, Bosnia, Macedonia, Slovenia and Serbia proper.

The anti-bureaucratic revolution of the late 1980s by Slobodan Milosević sought to reduce Kosovo's autonomy. In March 1989, the Assembly of Kosovo approved the amendments. The move led to the purged LKK members to establish the Social Democratic Party of Kosovo in February 1990. The party was dissolved on 12 October 1990.

== Party leaders ==
1. Miladin Popović (September 1944 – March 1945) (1910–1945)
2. Đorđije Pajković (March 1945 – February 1956) (1917–1980)
3. Dušan Mugoša (February 1956 – 1965) (1914–1973)
4. Veli Deva (1965 – 28 June 1971) (1924–2015)
5. Mahmut Bakalli (28 June 1971 – 6 May 1981) (1936–2006)
6. Veli Deva (6 May 1981 – June 1982) (1924–2015)
7. Sinan Hasani (June 1982 – May 1983) (1922–2010)
8. Ilaz Kurteshi (May 1983 – March 1984) (1927–2016)
9. Svetislav Dolašević (March 1984 – May 1985) (1926–1995)
10. Kolë Shiroka (May 1985 – May 1986) (1922–1994)
11. Azem Vllasi (May 1986 – May 1988) (born 1948)
12. Kaqusha Jashari (May 1988 - 17 November 1988) (1946–2025)
13. Remzi Kolgeci (acting; 17 November 1988 – 27 January 1989) (1947–2011)
14. Rrahman Morina (27 January 1989 – 12 October 1990) (1943–1990)

== See also ==
- History of Kosovo
- League of Communists of Yugoslavia
  - League of Communists of Bosnia and Herzegovina
  - League of Communists of Croatia
  - League of Communists of Macedonia
  - League of Communists of Montenegro
  - League of Communists of Serbia
    - League of Communists of Vojvodina
  - League of Communists of Slovenia
- List of leaders of communist Yugoslavia
- Socialist Federal Republic of Yugoslavia
