= Kaqusha Jashari =

Kosovan politician and engineer (1946–2025)

Member of the Assembly of the Republic of Kosovo
- In office 13 November 2007 – 3 November 2010
- Parliamentary group: Democratic Party

President of the League of Communists of Kosovo
- In office 27 April 1988 – 17 November 1988
- Preceded by: Azem Vllasi
- Succeeded by: Remzi Kolgeci

10th Chairwoman of the Executive Council of SAP Kosovo
- In office 10 March 1987 – 9 May 1989
- President: Bajram Selani; Remzi Kolgeci
- Preceded by: Bahri Oruçi
- Succeeded by: Nikolla Shkreli

Personal details
- Born: Kaqusha Fejzullahu; 16 August 1946 Pristina, PR Serbia, FPR Yugoslavia (now Kosovo) (Note: In the official biography of Jashari published by the Kosova Academy of Sciences and Arts, her place of birth is listed as Pristina. However, in an earlier version of her biography published by the Assembly of the Republic of Kosovo, her birthplace is recorded as Skenderaj, because it is claimed that at the time she was born, her father was on duty in this municipality.)
- Died: 6 May 2025 (aged 78) Pristina, Kosovo
- Party: Social Democratic Party (1990–2025)
- Other political affiliations: League of Communists (until 1989)
Handball career
Senior clubs
- Years: Team
- 1961–1967: Kosova Prishtinë
- 1967–1969: Partizan
- 1969–197?: Kosova Prishtinë

Kaqusha Jashari (née Fejzullahu; 16 August 1946 – 6 May 2025) was a Kosovan politician and engineer. She was a member of the Assembly of Kosovo on the Democratic Party of Kosovo list from 2007 onwards.

From 1986 until November 1988, she and Azem Vllasi were the two leading Kosovo politicians. In November 1988, they were both dismissed in the "anti-bureaucratic revolution" because of their unwillingness to accept the constitutional amendments curbing Kosovo's autonomy, and were replaced by proxies of Slobodan Milošević, the leader of the League of Communists of Serbia at the time.

== Early life ==
Jashari was born in Pristina on 16 August 1946. She received her primary and secondary education in Kamenica, Gjilan and Pristina, while she started the Faculty of Civil Engineering in Belgrade and completed it in Pristina. She was the daughter of Halil Fejzullahu, a World War II soldier from the village of Tugjec in Kamenica. The family had an apartment in Bulevar kralja Aleksandra, Belgrade, which Jashari lived in after her father's death, although Radmila Vuličević from Pristina claims to be the legal owner. She was the sister of former handball manager and player Petrit Fejzula.

== Politics ==
In May 1988, Jashari replaced Azem Vllasi as the President of the Provincial Committee of the League of Communists of Kosovo. It seems that the Serbian republican government "accepted" her as her mother was said to be a Montenegrin.

From 17 to 21 October, Albanians held protests throughout Kosovo against the changing of status of the SAP Kosovo. On 17 November 1988, Jashari and Vllasi were forced to resign and Rahman Morina was elected President of the Provincial Committee on 27 January 1989 by the Presidium of the Provincial Committee. This sparked new protests by Albanian youths and workers. They were both dismissed because of their unwillingness to accept the constitutional amendments curbing Kosovo's autonomy, and were replaced by proxies of Slobodan Milošević, the leader of the League of Communists of Serbia at the time.

On 20 October 1990, Marko Orlandić and Jashari guested the gathering of Serbs and Montenegrins in Kosovo Polje, which was not met with positive reactions.

She was the president of the Social Democratic Party of Kosovo (PSDK) from 1991 until 2008, when she was succeeded by the former prime minister and Kosovo Liberation Army (KLA) guerilla leader Agim Çeku.

== Death ==
Jashari died on 6 May 2025, at the age of 78.
