= Petrit Fejzula =

Yugoslav handball player

Personal information
- Full name: Petrit Fejzula
- Nationality: Yugoslav
- Born: 16 December 1951 (age 74) Pristina, PR Serbia, FPR Yugoslavia
- Height: 1.85 m (6 ft 1 in)

Sport
- Sport: Handball
- Position: Pivot

Youth career
- Years: Team
- –1970: Obilić

Senior clubs
- Years: Team
- 1970–1976: Crvena zvezda
- 1976–1980: Dinamo Pančevo
- 1980–1982: Crvena zvezda
- 1982–1985: Barcelona
- 1985–1986: Crvena zvezda
National team
- Years: Team
- 1973–1982: Yugoslavia

Teams managed
- 1986–1987: Crvena zvezda
- Yugoslavia U20 (technical director)
- 1993–1999: Sant Esteve Sesrovires
Medal record
World Championship
Silver medal – second place	1982 West Germany

Petrit Fejzula (Serbian Cyrillic: Петрит Фејзула; Albanian: Petrit Fejzullahu; born 16 December 1951) is a Yugoslav former handball manager and player. He was a member of the Yugoslavia national handball team. Fejzula was part of the team at the 1978 and 1982 World Men's Handball Championship. He is the brother of former politician and engineer Kaqusha Jashari.

== Honours ==
Barcelona

- Copa del Rey: 1982–83, 1983–84, 1984–85
- Cup Winners' Cup: 1983–84, 1984–85
