= Anti-bureaucratic revolution =

Campaign of protests in Yugoslavia (1988–1989)

The anti-bureaucratic revolution (Serbian: Антибирократска револуција, Antibirokratska revolucija) was a campaign of street protests by supporters of Serbian leader Slobodan Milošević that ran between 1988 and 1989 in Yugoslavia. The protests overthrew the government of the Socialist Republic of Montenegro as well as the governments of the Serbian provinces of Vojvodina and Kosovo, and replaced them with Milošević allies, thereby creating a dominant voting bloc within the Yugoslav presidency council.

The name anti-bureaucratic revolution is derived from the proclaimed goal of replacing bureaucratic and corrupt governing structures.

The events were condemned by the communist governments of the western Yugoslav republics (especially Slovenia and Croatia), who successfully resisted the attempts to expand the revolt onto their territories, and turned against Milošević. The rising antagonism eventually resulted in the dissolution of the ruling League of Communists of Yugoslavia in 1990.

== Prelude ==
Since the adoption of the 1974 Yugoslav Constitution, Serbian central government often encountered political deadlocks with the provincial governments in Kosovo and Vojvodina. In 1976 the Serbian government issued its first complaints of unconstitutional practice of autonomy by the provinces to Tito and Edvard Kardelj and issued a subsequent complaint in 1984 on the matter, attempting to resolve the problems within the 1974 Constitution. It was reported that the provinces had repeatedly denied the Serbian government the ability to enact policies in their territories, such as regulation of citizenship policy, common defense law, and social plans.

The situation in Kosovo became a crisis in the 1981 protests in Kosovo by Albanians who were heard shouting slogans such as "We are Albanians, not Yugoslavs", "Kosova Republic", "Unity with Albania" and "Long live Marxism-Leninism, Down with Revisionism". The presence of ethnic and ideological dimensions to the protestors' demands led Yugoslav authorities to decide to forcibly stop the protests. The president of the Pristina League of Communists, Aslan Fazlia (an Albanian) said that the protests were nationalistic and counterrevolutionary and announced tough police action against the demonstrators. This action failed to quell the protests that instead grew in response with protests by Albanians sweeping across Kosovo. The President of the League of Communists of Kosovo Mahmut Bakalli decided in response to ask the Yugoslav People's Army (JNA) to bring tanks onto the streets. Police reinforcements from Central Serbia were stopped by a roadblock and then Albanian demonstrators took hostages from thirty-four houses of Serbs and Montenegrins, demanding that these police forces leave Kosovo in exchange for the release of the hostages. Only after additional police forces from Priština arrived were the hostages released. The protests led to vandalism throughout Kosovo including smashed windows of cars, shops, and state institutions. The Yugoslav leadership declared a "crisis situation in Kosovo" and all republics were requested to send their police troops to Kosovo. The Yugoslav leadership was shocked by the extent of the violence used by the demonstrators and the relatively large participation in the demonstrations.

The aftermath of the 1981 protests in Kosovo resulted in resentment by Serbs in Kosovo to the political situation in Kosovo. Serbs suspected that deliberate Albanianization of Kosovo was demonstrated by statistics showing that the population of Serbs in Kosovo had significantly decreased from 23.5% in 1961 to 13.2% in 1981, as well as making claims that they were being persecuted by Albanians, including Serb women being systematically raped by Albanians. Many of these claims were not backed up by evidence but built up as rumours.

Milošević took control of the League of Communists of Yugoslavia's Serbian branch in September 1987, when his faction won over its opposition, led by Ivan Stambolić. His rise to power coincided with Serbo-Albanian tensions in Kosovo, as Kosovo Serbs felt oppressed by Albanians and the Albanian-dominated leadership of the province. The tensions were further boosted by inflammatory reports in the Serbian media.

According to the 1974 Yugoslav constitution, the two autonomous provinces of Serbia (Vojvodina and Kosovo) were largely independent from the central Serbian government, with both of them holding a seat in the Yugoslav Presidency, on par with the six constituent republics of Yugoslavia. In effect, their status was almost equivalent to the republics', which enabled provincial leaderships of Kosovo and Vojvodina to lead independent policies.

In late 1987 and 1988, a populist campaign started in Serbia against this situation, which it described as untenable. Provincial leaderships were being accused of bureaucratic inefficiency and alienation from the people. Popular slogans like "Oh Serbia in three parts, you will be whole again" (oj Srbijo iz tri dela ponovo ćeš biti cela) caught on. The atmosphere was further stirred up by numerous articles and readers' letters in Serbian press, the most notorious being Politika's rubric "Odjeci i reagovanja" (Echoes and reactions), a letters to the editor column which was used as a type of astroturfing.

The main points of the campaign were the following:

- Serbs in Kosovo were being harassed by Albanians and suppressed by the Albanian-dominated Kosovo government
- Due to the 1974 constitution, Serbia had no effective control over its provinces, whose leaderships were bureaucratic and estranged from the people
- This constitution was created by the influence of the other Yugoslav republics, especially Slovenia and Croatia, in order to suppress Serbia's power and create an environment for the exploitation of Serbia's natural resources
- The constitution had, in effect, created a confederal type of government, as no decision could be made without the consensus of all six republics in the federal parliament; and a system with a better consideration of popular majority was called for (the slogan "one man, one vote" was one of the most popular)
- Therefore, a thorough revision of the federal constitution and the enhancement of Serbian control over its provinces were necessary

== Protests ==
The mass protests started in February 1986, with several meetings of Kosovo Serbs in Belgrade and in Kosovo, pleading for a resolution of the problematic situation on Kosovo. These were relatively small, with 100–5,000 participants, and were mostly reactions to individual inter-ethnic incidents. The largest such protest was held in Kosovo Polje in April 1987, gathering around 20,000 people.

However, the outburst of protests began in the latter half of 1988. In June, the protest of workers of the Zmaj factory gathered 5,000 protestors; in July, meetings were held in seven towns with tens of thousands protesters, and in August in ten towns with 80,000 people. By September they spread to 39 towns with over 400,000 people.

=== Vojvodina (October 1988) ===
On 5 October 1988, around 150,000 people gathered in Novi Sad to protest against the Vojvodina provincial government. The gathering started a day earlier in the nearby town of Bačka Palanka, and, as Politika explained it, people spontaneously gathered and moved on to Novi Sad, the provincial capital. The protest in Bačka Palanka was led by Mihalj Kertes, a mid-level official of the Communist Party, an ethnic Hungarian who would later become famous for his remark "How can you Serbs be afraid of Serbia when I, a Hungarian, am not afraid of Serbia?".

The provincial leadership, led by Milovan Šogorov, Boško Krunić and Živan Berisavljević, were caught by surprise. Before the event, they tried to compromise and negotiate with Milošević, expressing cautious support for the constitutional changes while trying to keep their and Vojvodina's position intact. However, the avalanche of media campaign orchestrated from Belgrade was about to overwhelm them; they were labelled as power-hungry "armchairers" (фотељаши / foteljaši) and "autonomists" (аутономаши / autonomaši).

The Vojvodina government then cut off power and water supply to protesters, a move which enraged them further still, and caused even more people from Novi Sad and its vicinity to join. When power was restored, they tried a different tactic: in order to cheer the demonstrators up, they gave them bread and yogurt. However, thousands of yogurt packages were soon thrown at the Parliament building by angry protesters. Thus, the protests are sometimes referred to as the "Yogurt Revolution".

On 6 October, the entire collective leadership of Vojvodina resigned and were soon replaced with Nedeljko Šipovac, Radovan Pankov and Radoman Božović. The Vojvodina representative in the Central Committee of SKJ, Boško Krunić, resigned and was replaced by Stanko Radmilović, while the President of the Central Committee of the SKV, Milovan Šogorov, resigned and was replaced by Bogosav Kovačević.

=== Ušće rally (November 1988) ===
The rally in Belgrade, at Ušće (the large field at confluence of Sava River into Danube) was held on 19 November 1988. According to the state press, it gathered about a million people, and according to others, several hundred thousands. It was conceived as a "mother of all rallies", and a huge crowd of people come from all parts of Serbia by public and factory buses taken just for this opportunity. Milošević reaffirmed his and Serbia's commitment to the principles of liberty and Serbian equality within Yugoslavia:

We will win the battle for Kosovo regardless of the obstacles placed in front of us in the country and abroad. So, we will win regardless of the uniting of our enemies from abroad and those in the country. And that this nation will win the battle for freedom, is a fact well-known even to the Turkish and German conquerors.

=== Montenegro (January 1989) ===
Rallies and media were also similarly used in Montenegro with the first rally in support of Kosovo Serbs and Kosovo Montenegrins taking place in Titograd on 20 August 1988. The leadership of the Montenegrin Communist League was on the defense at the time, claiming that it was protecting Kosovo, but their restraint in direct support for Milošević was deemed not good enough by the protesters.

What eventually proved to be the revolution's first act occurred on 7 October 1988 when Montenegrin police intervened against protesters in Žuta Greda demanding resignations from the Montenegrin leadership. In order to deal with the situation the leadership proclaimed the state of emergency. The state of emergency did not last long, as it was taken as an act of hostility towards Serbia by media outlets controlled by Milošević as well as Milošević's supporters in Montenegro.

The second act started with joint rallies consisting of workers from Radoje Dakić, a state-owned factory, and Veljko Vlahović University students. On 10 January 1989, over 10,000 protesters gathered in Titograd. The old leadership, confused and disorganised, soon gave in; none of them later played a significant political role. The new younger cadre led by Momir Bulatović, Milo Đukanović and Svetozar Marović, became the new leadership, strongly allied with Milošević in the years to come. The League of Communists of Montenegro was subsequently transformed by the "triumvirate" who had full control over the (Socialist) Republic of Montenegro into the Democratic Party of Socialists of Montenegro, which stayed in power until 2020 when it was defeated for the first time in 2020 parliamentary election.

=== Reduction of Kosovar autonomy (March 1989) ===
Azem Vllasi and Kaqusha Jashari, the two top-ranked Kosovo politicians, were replaced in November 1988. The Albanian population of Kosovo grew restless, and in February 1989 they engaged in a general strike, particularly manifesting itself in the 1989 Kosovo miners' strike. Meanwhile, on February 28, another major rally was held in Belgrade, where the chants "We want weapons" and "Arrest Vllasi" were heard, and three days later, Vllasi was indeed placed under arrest.

In early 1989, the Assembly of Serbia proposed constitutional amendments which would significantly reduce SAP Kosovo's autonomous status within SR Serbia. Notably, the 47th amendment changed the Serbian constitution to require that the Assembly of Serbia only to seek the opinion of the assemblies of the autonomous provinces, instead of having to seek their approval for future constitutional amendments. Other controversial amendments allowed the Constitutional Court of Serbia to intervene in constitutional courts of the autonomous provinces before proceedings had concluded in those courts. Kosovo Albanians organized large demonstrations against these moves, but in March 1989, preceding a final push for the ratification of constitutional changes in the Assembly of Kosovo, the Yugoslav police rounded up around 240 prominent Kosovo Albanians, apparently selected based on their anti-ratification sentiment, and detained them with complete disregard for due process.

Albanian representatives in the Assembly of Kosovo were pressured to vote in favor on the matter on 23 March 1989, and with 187 of the 190 members present with, it was declared to have passed by a vote of 175 to 10 along with two abstentions. On 28 March the Serbian parliament approved the constitutional changes.

=== Gazimestan rally (June 1989) ===
The largest rally of all was held at Gazimestan on 28 June 1989, gathering two million according to Politika.

=== Failed Ljubljana rally (December 1989) ===
When a "Rally of Truth" (Slovene: Miting resnice) was announced to be held in Ljubljana, SR Slovenia on 1 December 1989, thousands of Milošević supporters who attended street protests around Yugoslavia were planned to arrive to Slovenia's capital. However, in an operation named "Action North" (Slovene: akcija Sever) Slovene police forces prevented it with the help of Croatian police forces, by preventing trains with Milošević supporters from passing through Croatia in order to reach Slovenia.

This action can be considered the first Slovenian defense action against the attacks of the supporters of Milošević, which later led to Slovenia's independence after the Ten-Day War.

== Aftermath ==
Events of the anti-bureaucratic revolution drastically changed the balance of power in the Presidency of Yugoslavia in little over a year of street protests and changes of party leaderships in Yugoslavia's provinces who were replaced by Milošević loyalists. Serbia's Borisav Jović (at the time the President of the Presidency), Montenegro's Nenad Bućin, Vojvodina's Jugoslav Kostić and Kosovo's Riza Sapunxhiu, started to form a four-member voting bloc in the eight-seat presidency. The reduction of provincial autonomy of Kosovo - but not the complete abolition of its provincial status - was seen as intentional, as Milošević needed the two "extra" provincial votes to gain influence in the federal presidency.

In SR Croatia, a new constitution was proclaimed in July 1990, and in August the Log Revolution started, an insurrection of ethnic Serbs in areas with significant Serb population, which led to the Croatian Parliament replacing its representative Stipe Šuvar in the Yugoslav presidency with Stjepan Mesić. However, Mesić only took his seat in October 1990 because of protests from Serbia.

From then on, Mesić joined Macedonia's Vasil Tupurkovski, Slovenia's Janez Drnovšek and Bosnia and Herzegovina's Bogić Bogićević in opposing the demands in March 1991 from the Milošević-backed other four members of presidency to proclaim a general state of emergency, which would have allowed the Yugoslav People's Army to impose martial law.

When Sapunxhiu 'defected' from his faction in the final vote, Jović briefly resigned and returned, Bućin was then replaced with Branko Kostić, and Sapunxhiu with Sejdo Bajramović, which effectively meant that the presidency was deadlocked. Soon after that, the country descended into escalations which led to Yugoslav Wars.

== See also ==
- 1991 protests in Belgrade
- 1996–1997 Serbian protests
- 2000 overthrow of Slobodan Milošević

== Sources ==
- Branka Magaš (1993). The Destruction of Yugoslavia: tracking the break-up 1980–92 (pp 165–170). Verso. ISBN 978-0-86091-593-5.
- Krieger, Heike (2001). The Kosovo Conflict and International Law: An Analytical Documentation 1974-1999. Cambridge University Press. ISBN 9780521800716.
- Anderson, Kenneth (1990). Yugoslavia, Crisis in Kosovo: A Report from Helsinki Watch and the International Helsinki Federation for Human Rights. Human Rights Watch. ISBN 9780929692562.
- Jović, Dejan (2008). Yugoslavia: A State that Withered Away. Purdue University. ISBN 9781557534958.
- Crampton, R. J. (2013). The Balkans Since the Second World War. Routledge. ISBN 9781317891161.
- Milosavljević, Olivera (2003). "Antibirokratska revolucija 1987-1989. godine". In Graovac, Igor; Fleck, Hans-Georg (eds.). Dijalog povjesničara – istoričara 8, Zadar (PDF) (in Serbian). Zagreb, Croatia: Political Science Research Centre Ltd. (PSRC) for Scientific Research Work / Zaklada Friedrich-Naumann. ISBN 953-6922-06-1. Archived from the original (PDF) on 2007-09-28.
