= Sinan Hasani =

8th President of Yugoslavia (1922–2010)

Sinan Hasani Синан Хасани
- Sinan Hasani

8th President of the Presidency of Yugoslavia
- In office 15 May 1986 – 15 May 1987
- Prime Minister: Branko Mikulić
- Preceded by: Radovan Vlajković
- Succeeded by: Lazar Mojsov

President of the League of Communists of Kosovo
- In office June 1981 – May 1983
- Preceded by: Velli Deva
- Succeeded by: Ilaz Kurteshi

Personal details
- Born: 14 May 1922 Požaranje, Kingdom of Serbs, Croats and Slovenes (modern Kosovo)
- Died: 28 August 2010 (aged 88) Belgrade, Serbia
- Party: League of Communists of Yugoslavia (SKJ)

Sinan Hasani (Serbian: Синан Хасани; 14 May 1922 – 28 August 2010) was a Yugoslav novelist, statesman, diplomat and a former President of the Presidency of Yugoslavia, a revolving form of executive leadership which rendered him the President of Yugoslavia at the time as well. He was of Albanian ethnicity.

== Early life and career ==
Hasani finished primary school and Gazi Isa-bey madrasah (high school) in Skopje. He became a writer and wrote his first Albanian language novel, The Grape Starts to Ripen, in 1957.

Hasani joined the Yugoslav Partisan resistance movement in 1941, during the war, and the Yugoslav Communist Party in 1942. He found himself in Nazi German captivity in 1944, and spent time in a POW camp near Vienna until the end of World War II. After the war, he attended the Đuro Đaković party school in Belgrade (1950–52). Later, he became leader of the Socialist Union of the Working People mass organization in Kosovo, and was from 1965 to 1967 manager of the Kosovar publishing house Rilindja. From 1971 to 1974, he was the Yugoslav ambassador to Denmark. In 1975 he was elected Deputy Speaker of the Yugoslav Federal Assembly, and remained in that position until he became the leader of the League of Communists of Kosovo in 1982.

== Presidency ==
Hasani was elected as the Kosovan member of the Yugoslavian presidency in 1984 with his term ending in 1989. He also served as head of the rotating presidency. On Hasani's first day as president, he and his presidency unanimously appointed Branko Mikulić as the federal Prime Minister of Yugoslavia. After Mikulić and his cabinet voluntarily resigned in March 1989, as the first federal ministry in the history of Socialist Yugoslavia, Hasani initially supported the unsuccessful bid of the Milošević loyalist and Serb hardliner Borisav Jović, to become the federal PM. It was contrary to the candidacy of the economically liberal reformist Ante Marković, which was proposed by the republics of Slovenia and Croatia, and finally approved by the Federal Assembly of Yugoslavia, and also by the outgoing presidency, including Hasani himself.

Hasani died in Belgrade on 28 August 2010 at the age of 88.

== Works ==
Hasani also wrote a number of novels in Albanian, which were translated into Serbo-Croatian and Macedonian.

=== Novels ===
- Një natë e turbullt ("A troubled night", 1966)
- Fëmijëria e Gjon Vatrës ("The childhood of Gjon Vatra", 1975)
- Për bukën e bardhë ("For the white bread", 1977)

=== Other works ===
- Kosovo : istine i zablude, ("Kosovo, Truths and Illusions" 1986, in Serbian, concerning Albanian nationalism in Kosovo)
- Në fokus të ngjarjeve : bisedë me Sinan Hasanin / Tahir Z. Berisha ("In the focus of events, a conversation with Sinan Hasani / Tahir Z. Berisha" 2005, Biography, ISBN 9951-408-08-7)

== Sources ==
- Raif Dizdarević, Od smrti Tita do smrti Jugoslavije ("From Tito's death to the death of Yugoslavia", Sarajevo: Svjetlost, 2000)

Political offices
Preceded by Radovan Vlajković	President of the Presidency of SFR Yugoslavia; 15 May 1986 – 15 May 1987	Succeeded by Lazar Mojsov
Party political offices
Preceded by Velli Deva	Chairman of the Central Committee of the League of Communists of Kosovo; 15 May 1982 – 15 June 1983	Succeeded by Ilaz Kurteshi
