= Mahmut Bakalli =

Kosovar Albanian politician (1936–2006)

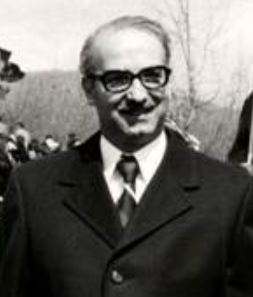

President of the Provincial Committee of the League of Communists of Kosovo
- In office 28 June 1971 – 6 May 1981
- Preceded by: Veli Deva
- Succeeded by: Veli Deva

Personal details
- Born: 19 January 1936 Đakovica, Yugoslavia (now Gjakova, Kosovo)
- Died: 14 April 2006 (aged 70) Pristina, United Nations Administered Kosovo
- Party: Alliance for the Future of Kosovo (from 2001); League of Communists of Kosovo (until 1989)
- Education: University of Belgrade
- Profession: Sociologist, Politician

Mahmut Bakalli^{[a]} (19 January 1936 – 14 April 2006) was a Kosovo Albanian politician.

Bakalli began his political career in the youth organization of the League of Communists of Kosovo, eventually becoming its leader in 1961. In 1967, he became head of the party's Prishtina chapter. As he rose through the ranks, he was elected to the Central Committee of the party's Serbian chapter, and to the Presidium of the League of Communists of Yugoslavia's Central Committee.

Bakalli led the Communist Party in Kosovo during the late 1970s and early 1980s, but resigned after disagreeing with the way the 1981 protests by ethnic Albanian students were handled by Kosovo's own police, headed by Rahman Morina. Bakalli then spent two years under house arrest, before being expelled from the party. He was after that allowed to work in the province's Science Association until retirement, but was forced out when Slobodan Milošević increased Serbian control over Kosovo in the late 1980s.

He was a member of the Assembly of Kosovo from 2001. He also worked as an adviser to prime minister Agim Çeku. He graduated from the University of Belgrade's Faculty of Political Science.

In 2002, Bakalli was the first witness to testify at The Hague International Criminal Tribunal for the Former Yugoslavia at the trial of Slobodan Milošević.

Bakalli was married and had three daughters. He succumbed to throat cancer on April 14, 2006, at the age of 70 following a prolonged treatment.

== Notes ==
a.	Albanian spelling: Mahmut Bakalli, Serbo-Croat spelling: Махмут Бакали, Mahmut Bakali.
