= 1981 protests in Kosovo =

Protests and riots demanding greater Kosovan autonomy within the SFR Yugoslavia

- Part of the breakup of Yugoslavia
- Date: 11 March – 3 April 1981
- Location: SAP Kosovo, SR Serbia, Yugoslavia
- Goals: Demanding higher autonomy for Kosovo
- Methods: Protests, Civil unrest
- Result: Protests failed

Parties
- SFR Yugoslavia
  - SR Serbia
    - SAP Kosovo
Kosovo Albanian protestors
Supported by:
Albania

Lead figures
Cvijetin Mijatović; Dobrivoje Vidić; Xhavid Nimani	Besim Baraliu; Fehmi Lladrovci; Milazim Shala; Aslan Pireva †; Hydajet Hyseni; Jakup Krasniqi

Casualties and losses
4 killed	7 killed 4,200 arrested 1,500 expelled from LCY

In March and April 1981, a student protest in Pristina, the capital of the then Socialist Autonomous Province of Kosovo, led to widespread protests by Kosovo Albanians demanding more autonomy within the Socialist Federal Republic of Yugoslavia. The Presidency of Yugoslavia declared a state of emergency in Pristina and Kosovska Mitrovica, which led to rioting. The unrest was suppressed by a large police intervention that caused numerous casualties, and a period of political repression followed.

== Background ==
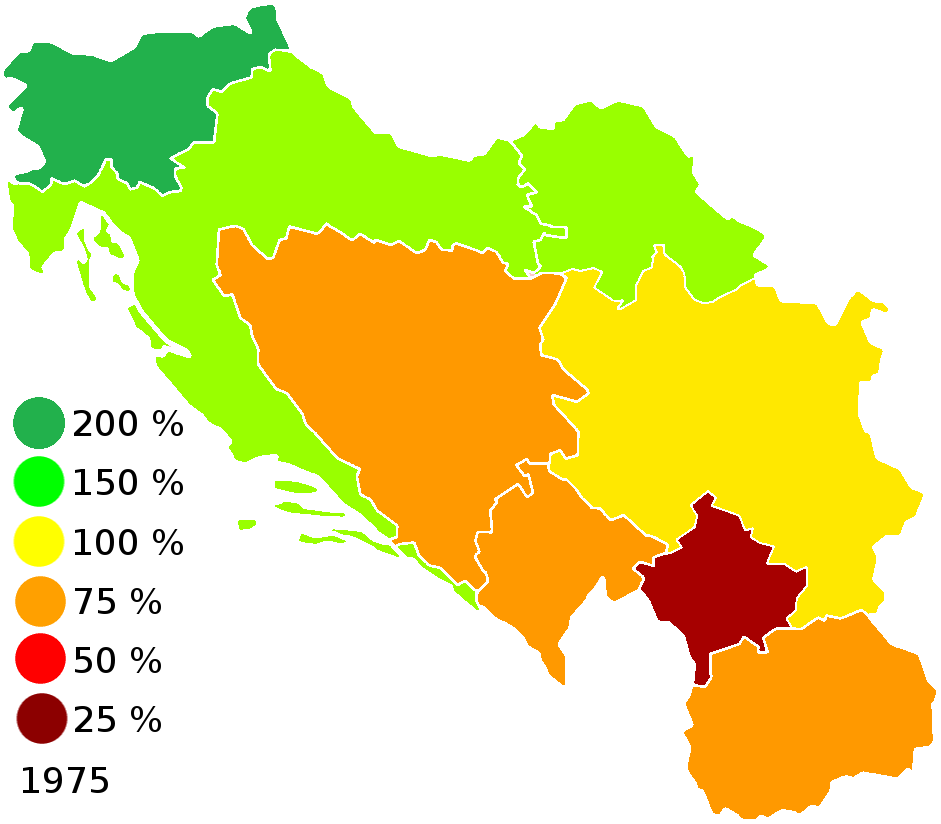
Average strength of Yugoslav state economies as a deviation from the Yugoslav average in 1975. SAP Kosovo (in red) was the least developed entity within Yugoslavia.

The University of Pristina was the starting point of the 1981 Kosovo student protests. Kosovo's cultural isolation within Yugoslavia and its endemic underdevelopment, compared to the rest of the country, resulted in the province having the highest ratio of both students and illiterates in Yugoslavia. A university education was not deemed a guarantee of future employment; instead of training students for technical careers, the university specialized in liberal arts, in particular in Albanology, which could hardly secure work except in bureaucracy or local cultural institutions, especially outside of Kosovo. This created a large pool of unemployed but highly educated, and resentful, Albanians – prime recruits for nationalist sentiment. Demonstrations were organized by several professors and students: Besim Baraliu, Fehmi Lladrovc.

In addition, the Serb and Montenegrin population of Kosovo increasingly resented the economic and social burden incurred by the university's student population. By 1981, the University of Pristina had 20,000 students – one in ten of the city's total population.

== Student protests ==
The demonstrations started on 11 March 1981, originally as a spontaneous small-scale protest for better food in the school cafeteria and improved living conditions in the dormitories. Tired of being made to wait in line, for hours, for poor quality food, students began demonstrating under Gani Koci's command, who later was arrested. Two to four thousand demonstrators were dispersed by police, with around a hundred arrests made.

The student protests resumed two weeks later on 26 March 1981, as several thousand demonstrators chanted increasingly nationalist slogans, and the police used force to disperse them, injuring 32 people. The engagement included a sit-in by Albanian students in a dormitory.

As the police reacted negatively to a perceived increase in nationalism among the protesters, more arrests were made, which in turn fueled more protests. On 30 March, students of the three of the largest university faculties declared a boycott, fearing a return of Rankovićism.

The demands of the Albanian students were both nationalist and egalitarianist, implying a desire for a different kind of socialism than the Yugoslav kind, marked by semi-confederalism and workers' self-management.

== Escalation of protests ==
On 1 April, demonstrations swept through Kosovo, and 17 policemen were injured in clashes with demonstrators, failing to disperse them. The army moved in to secure state institutions, and Mahmut Bakalli soon called on them to send tanks to the streets.

Within days, the protests over conditions for students turned into discontent over the treatment of the ethnic Albanian population by the Serbian majority, and then to rioting and Albanian nationalist demands. The primary demand was that Kosovo become a republic within Yugoslavia as opposed to its then-current status as a province of Serbia.

The authorities blamed the protests on nationalist radicals – the May 1981 Politika said the goal of the protests was for a Republic of Kosovo to become separate from Yugoslavia, and join Albania. The authorities imposed a ban on foreign reporting, and the local reporting, unlike at the time of the 1968 protests in Kosovo, entirely lacked independence, and instead ran only official statements. Some of the official statements were inherently vague, talking of "internal and external enemies", which provoked a variety of conspiracy theories that stoked nationalist sentiment elsewhere in Yugoslavia. One of the conspiracy theories was promoted by Azem Vllasi, who later publicly discussed the alleged involvement of the Albanian security service Sigurimi in the protests.

The demand that Kosovo become the seventh republic of Yugoslavia was politically unacceptable to Serbia and the Socialist Republic of Macedonia.

A standoff happened near Podujevo, where police reinforcements coming in from Central Serbia were stopped by Albanian demonstrators who had taken local Serbs and Montenegrins as hostages.

Some of the groups of protesters were Marxist–Leninist whose ideology was shaped by the views of the Albanian leader Enver Hoxha. Yugoslav authorities accused Albania of interfering in their internal matters. The level of influence exerted by the Albanian government in the protests is disputed however. Mertus notes that some of the students held up signs saying "We Are Enver Hoxha's Soldiers" but that their numbers were small. Albania used radio, television and sent books to encourage Kosovo Albanians to "unite with the motherland" but little else beyond that, as Mertus argues directly assisting the protesters would have been a violation of Albanian policy.

== State of emergency ==
The leadership of the League of Communists of Yugoslavia saw the protesters' opposition to self-management and their nationalism as a grave threat, and decided to "suppress them by all available means".

On 2 April 1981 the Presidency of Yugoslavia under the chairmanship of Cvijetin Mijatović declared a state of emergency in Pristina and Kosovska Mitrovica, which lasted one week.

Presidency sent in special forces to stop the demonstrations.

The federal government rushed up to 30,000 troops to the province. Riots broke out and the Yugoslav authorities used force against the protesters.

On 3 April, the last demonstrations happened in Vučitrn, Uroševac, Vitina and Kosovska Mitrovica, which were soon suppressed by the additional police deployment.

The rioting involved 20,000 people in six cities.

In late April, New York Times reported that nine people had died and more than fifty were injured during the protests. In July, the outlet reported that more than 250 had been injured by the end of the protests.

== Aftermath ==
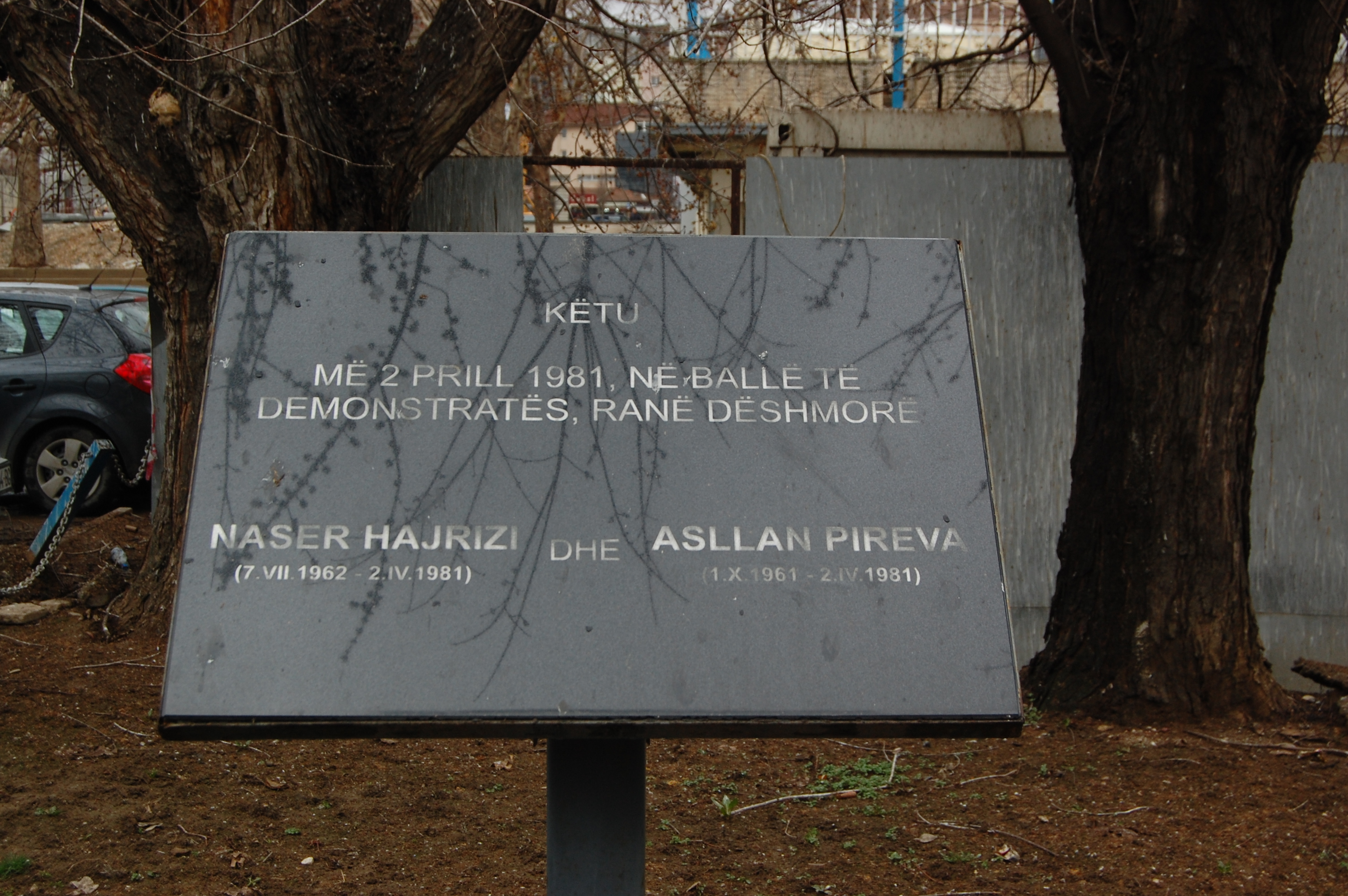
Memorial to two of the dead, in Pristina

Kosovo's Communist Party suffered purges, with several key figures, including its president, expelled. Veli Deva replaced Bakalli because he was thought to have been harder on Tirana.

Following the demonstrations, the University of Pristina faculty and students were purged of those deemed to be "separatists". 226 students and workers were tried, convicted and sentenced to up to fifteen years in prison. Many Albanians were purged from official posts, including the president of the university and two rectors. They were replaced with Communist Party hardliners. The university was also prohibited from using textbooks imported from Albania; from then on, the university was only permitted to use books translated from Serbo-Croatian. The demonstrations also produced a growing tendency for Serbian politicians to demand centralization, the unity of Serb lands, a decrease in cultural pluralism for Albanians and an increase in the protection and promotion of Serbian culture. The university was denounced by the Serbian Communist leadership as a "fortress of nationalism".

Presidency did not repeal the province's autonomy as some Serbian Communists demanded.

The League of Communists of Kosovo declared the riots to be a product of Albanian nationalism, and Serbia reacted by a desire to reduce the power of the Albanians in the province, and a propaganda campaign that claimed that Serbs were being pushed out of the province primarily by the growing Albanian population, rather than the bad state of the economy.

In 1981, it was reported that some 4,000 Serbs planned to move from Kosovo to Central Serbia after the riots in March that resulted in several Serb deaths and the desecration of Serbian Orthodox architecture and graveyards. 33 nationalist formations were dismantled by the Yugoslav Police who sentenced some 280 people (800 fined, 100 under investigation) and seized arms caches and propaganda material.

The demonstrations in Kosovo were the beginning of a deep crisis in Yugoslavia that later led to its dissolution. The government response to the demonstrations changed the political discourse in the country in a way that significantly impaired its ability to sustain itself in the future.

== In literature and arts ==
The events inspired a novel by Albanian writer Ismail Kadare, The Wedding Procession Turned to Ice (Albanian: Krushqit janë të ngrirë), where he describes an Albanian physician, Teuta Shkreli, tending to the injured students. The figure of Teuta was inspired by the actions of Albanian physician Sehadete Mekuli, gynaecologist and wife of Albanian writer Esad Mekuli.

== See also ==
- 2013 protests in Kosovo
- 2014 student protest in Kosovo

== Sources ==
- Mertus, Julie A. (1999). "The 1981 Student Demonstrations". Kosovo: How Myths and Truths Started a War. University of California Press. ISBN 0-253-20703-7. Archived from the original on 1 December 2008.
- Jović, Dejan (2009). Yugoslavia: A State That Withered Away. Purdue University Press. p. 184. ISBN 9781557534958.
- Kostovicova, Denisa (2005). Kosovo: the politics of identity and space. Routledge. ISBN 9780415348065.
- Ramet, Sabrina P. (2010). Central and Southeast European Politics Since 1989. Cambridge University Press. ISBN 9780521716161.
- Bulatović, Predrag, ed. (May 1981). Шта се догађало на Косову [What was happening in Kosovo]. Politika's Little Library (in Serbian). Belgrade: Politika.
- Elsie, Robert (2010). Historical Dictionary of Kosovo. Scarecrow Press. ISBN 9780810874831.
- Di Lellio, Anna (2006). The Case for Kosova: Passage to Independence. Anthem Press. ISBN 9780857287120.
