= Lazar Mojsov =

Yugoslav Macedonian politician (1920– 2011)

- Лазар Мојсов
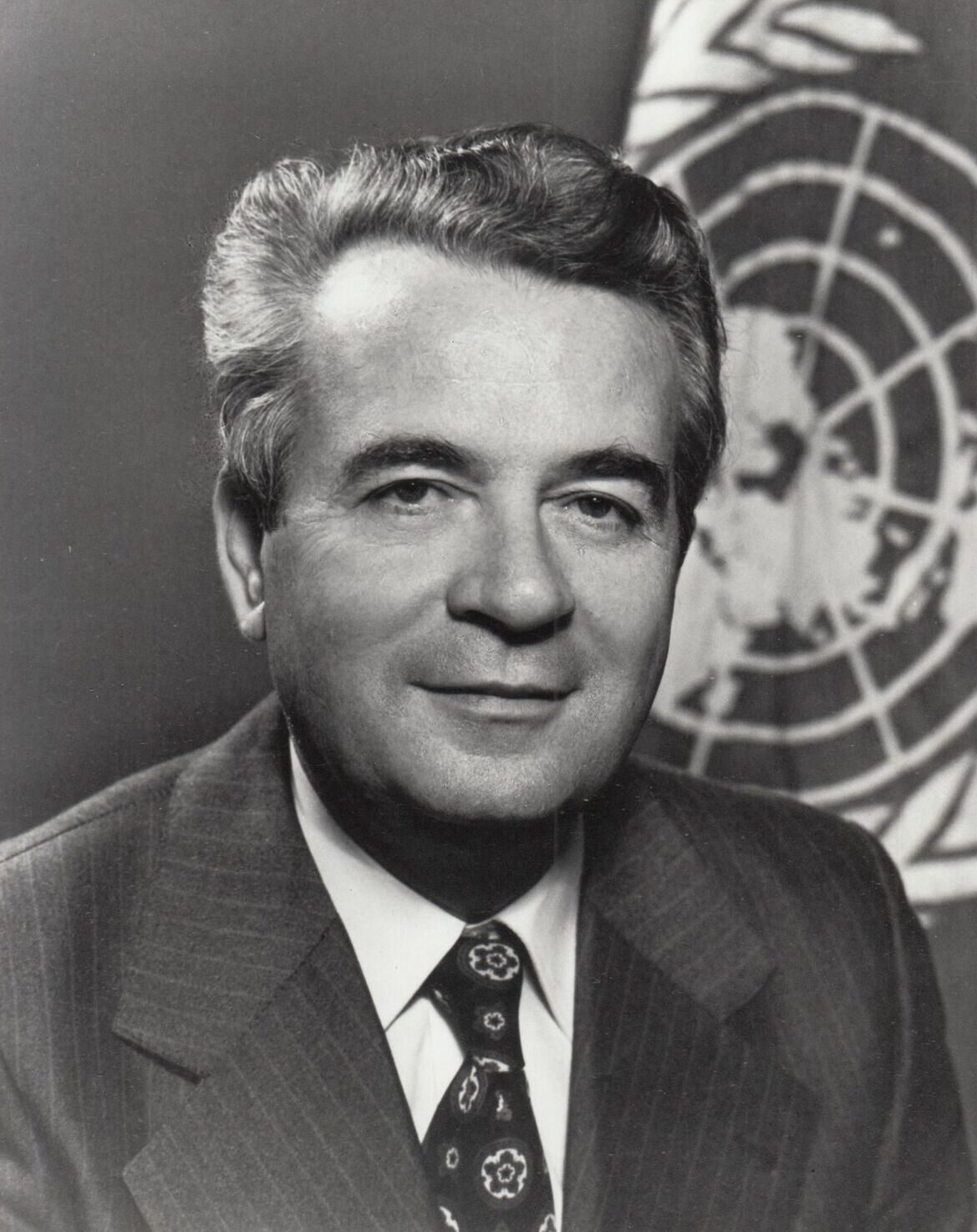
- Mojsov, c. 1977

9th President of the Presidency of Yugoslavia
- In office 15 May 1987 – 15 May 1988
- Prime Minister: Branko Mikulić
- Preceded by: Sinan Hasani
- Succeeded by: Raif Dizdarević

15th Vice President of the Presidency of Yugoslavia
- In office 15 May 1986 – 15 May 1987
- President: Sinan Hasani
- Preceded by: Sinan Hasani
- Succeeded by: Hamdija Pozderac

President of the Presidency of the LCY Central Committee
- In office 20 October 1980 – 20 October 1981
- Preceded by: Stevan Doronjski
- Succeeded by: Dušan Dragosavac

34th President of the United Nations General Assembly
- In office 1977–1978
- Preceded by: Hamilton Shirley Amerasinghe
- Succeeded by: Indalecio Liévano

Personal details
- Born: 19 December 1920 Negotino, Kingdom of Serbs, Croats and Slovenes
- Died: 25 August 2011 (aged 90) Belgrade, Serbia
- Party: League of Communists of Yugoslavia (SKJ)
- Children: Svetlana Mojsov
- Education: University of Belgrade

Lazar Mojsov (Macedonian: Лазар Мојсов; 19 December 1920 – 25 August 2011) was a Macedonian journalist, communist politician and diplomat from SFR Yugoslavia.

== Biography ==
Mojsov was born on 19 December 1920 in Negotino, Kingdom of Serbs, Croats and Slovenes. Mojsov received his doctoral degree from the University of Belgrade's Law School and joined the Communist Party of Yugoslavia. He fought for the anti-fascist partisans in World War II. During the 1940s, he participated as the public prosecutor in the show trials against many real or alleged collaborators, and people with pro-Bulgarian views, who were sentenced to death for treason, in Socialist Republic of Macedonia. He was the attorney general of SR Macedonia from 1948 to 1951. During the next two decades, he served as a member of the parliaments of SFR Yugoslavia and SR Macedonia and as editor-chief of Nova Makedonija and Borba. Meanwhile, he began a diplomatic career, serving as Yugoslav ambassador to the Soviet Union and Mongolia from 1958 to 1961 and as ambassador to Austria from 1967 to 1969. From 1969 to 1974, he served as Yugoslav ambassador to the United Nations, Guyana and Jamaica.

From 1974 to 1982, Mojsov was deputy foreign minister of Yugoslavia, and, from 1977 to 1978, he was the president of the United Nations General Assembly. From 1980 to 1981, he served as Chairman of the Presidium of the Central Committee of the League of Communists of Yugoslavia, and from May 1982 to May 1984, he was the foreign minister. From 1984 to 1989, he was a member of the collective presidency of Yugoslavia and was its chairman from 15 May 1987 to 15 May 1988. After the 1989 Kosovo miners' strike, he participated in the preparation of the arrest of Kosovo Albanian politician Azem Vllasi on 2 March by fabricating a story that he had a document where Vllasi and other Kosovo Albanian leaders had a three-phase plan, starting with the strike and ending with an insurrection, while also blaming the Albanian secret service in Tirana. In 1990, he became a member of the Serbian political party League of Communists – Movement for Yugoslavia. Mojsov also wrote on the subjects of foreign policy and the Macedonian Question. Mojsov died in August 2011, aged 90, in Belgrade. He was buried at Belgrade New Cemetery's Alley of Distinguished Citizens. His daughter Svetlana Mojsov is a scientist.

Diplomatic posts
Preceded by Hamilton Shirley Amerasinghe	President of the United Nations General Assembly; 1977–1978	Succeeded by Indalecio Liévano
Political offices
Preceded by Sinan Hasani	President of the Presidency of SFR Yugoslavia; 15 May 1987 – 15 May 1988	Succeeded by Raif Dizdarević
Party political offices
Preceded by Josip Broz Tito	President of the Presidency of the League of Communists of Yugoslavia; 20 October 1980 – 20 October 1981	Succeeded by Dušan Dragosavac
