= Dušan Mugoša =

Yugoslav communist and partisan leader (1914-73)

- Душан Мугоша
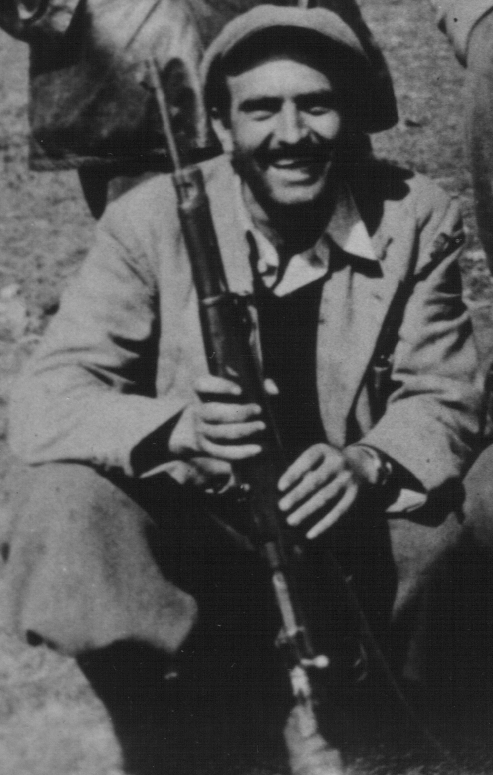
- Dušan Mugoša in Albania in 1942–43.
- Born: 7 January 1914; Lješkopolje near Podgorica, Kingdom of Montenegro
- Died: 8 August 1973 (aged 59)
- Military career
- Allegiance: SFR Yugoslavia

Dušan Mugoša (Serbian Cyrillic: Душан Мугоша fl. 7 January 1914 – 8 August 1973), nicknamed Duć (Дућ), was a Yugoslav communist and partisan leader during World War II who played a central role in the antifascist resistance during World War II in Yugoslavia.

He and Miladin Popović were the Yugoslav delegates that helped unite the Albanian communist groups in 1941. The two had been sent to Albania on the directive of the Central Committee of the Communist Party of Yugoslavia (CK KPJ), chosen for their revolutionary experience and political knowledge, to be available to the Albanian communists; they were the most active regarding Yugoslav–Albanian alliance.

== Early life ==
Dušan Mugoša was born in Lješkopolje near Podgorica, into a farming family. His family descended from the Mugoša tribe (pleme). He completed his lower secondary education in Peć (now Peja) and began his upper secondary education in Prizren, which he had to abandon due to his political activities. During his schooling, Mugoša connected with communists and progressive youth. In 1934, he became a member of the Communist Party of Yugoslavia (KPJ). By 1938, he was elected to the KPJ City Committee in Peć, and in 1940, he was elected to the District Committee of the KPJ for Kosovo and Metohija. Due to his revolutionary activities, Mugoša was frequently arrested and persecuted, and after demonstrations in Peć in May 1940, he went underground.

== World War II ==
At the outbreak of World War II, Dušan Mugoša actively participated in organizing the uprising in Kosovo and Metohija. In late 1941, following a directive from the Central Committee of the Communist Party of Yugoslavia (KPJ) and an invitation from Miladin Popović, the Secretary of the District Committee for Kosovo and Metohija, he went to Albania. Mugoša and Popović were members of the Regional Committee KPJ (OK KPJ) of Kosmet (Kosovo and Metohija).

In October 1941, OK KPJ Kosmet representatives Boro Vukmirović, Dušan Mugoša, Pavle Jovićević and Ali Šukrija met with Albanian communist delegation made up by Koço Tashko, Xhevdet Doda and Elhami Nimani in Vitomirica (in Kosovo). After having persuaded the disunited Albanian communists to pursue a common fight for "liberation from capitalistic exploitations and Imperial slavery", the work culminated in the meeting of 8 November 1941, with over twenty representatives, that ended in the official establishment of the Albanian Communist Party. He also worked on establishing the Communist Youth of Albania, and forming combat and sabotage groups to fight against fascist occupiers and their collaborators.

While in Tirana, after the freeing of Popović, Krsto Filipović and others from prison camps, the OK KPJ Kosmet decided that Mugoša and Popović stay in Albania. Boro Vukmirović requested that Mugoša be returned to Kosovo. On 25 May 1942, Mugoša began his trip crossing Montenegro, joining up with Todor Vojvodić and Spasoje Đaković in Andrijevica. As the secretary of OK KPJ of Kosmet, he announced the annexation of Kosovo and Metohija to Serbia.

He left Albania on 12 April 1944. The three most influential in the decision of uniting Vojvodina and Kosovo and Metohija to NR Serbia were Jovan Veselinov, Dušan Mugoša, and Mehmed Hoxha, who represented the provinces on the extraordinary session of the Anti-Fascist Council of the National Liberation of Serbia on 6 April 1945.

== Sources ==
- Đaković, Spasoje (1986). Sukobi na Kosovu. Narodna knjiga. ISBN 9788633100854.
