= Miladin Popović =

Yugoslav Partisan

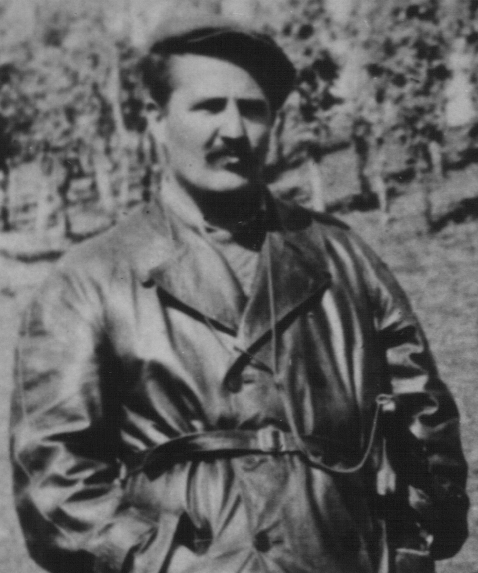
- Popović, c. 1942
- Born: 23 September 1910; Lopate, Kingdom of Montenegro
- Died: 13 March 1945 (aged 34); Priština, DF Yugoslavia

Miladin Popović (Serbian Cyrillic: Миладин Поповић; 23 September 1910 – 13 March 1945) was a Yugoslav Partisan and secretary of the Regional Committee of the Communist Party of Yugoslavia (OK KPJ) of Kosmet (Kosovo). He was one of the organizers of the partisan fighting in Kosovo. He was posthumously given the Hero of Yugoslavia award.

== Life ==
An active communist in Kosovo, he was arrested on 18 July 1941 near Rožaje, and sent to a concentration camp near Peqin in Albania. He managed to escape with the support of the Albanian communists a few months later.

He and Dušan Mugoša were the Yugoslav delegates that in 1941 helped the Albanian communist groups unite and create the Communist Party of Albania. The two had been sent to Albania on the directive of the Central Committee of the Communist Party of Yugoslavia (CK KPJ), chosen for their revolutionary experience and political knowledge, to be available to the Albanian communists; they were the most active regarding Yugoslav–Albanian alliance. This claim was disputed by the Albanians, who maintained that Popović was not sent as a delegate by the Yugoslav Party, but was only present at the founding of the Communist Party of Albania as a result of his imprisonment in Peqin and his rescue on the orders of Enver Hoxha and Qemal Stafa. Mugoša and Popović of whom were members of the Regional Committee KPJ (OK KPJ) of Kosmet (Kosovo).

Popović left Albania in September 1944. He was killed on 13 March 1945 in Pristina by two Kosovar Albanians, Haki Taha and Qazim Vula, both members of the anticommunist Albanian National Democratic Movement (NDSH). Taha killed himself right after murdering Popović, whereas Vula was arrested and given a life sentence, but managed to escape from the prison of Niš, and fled to Albania, where he was again arrested. Vula died in 1987. Sources disagree about the motives of Taha and Vula: while the Yugoslavian regime said that the two killers were motivated by anti-Serbian sentiments, communist Albania's version was that they were used as kamikaze by the Yugoslav secret police (UDBA), who wanted to eliminate Popović for his pro-Albanian sentiments.

Inside the CPA and the CPY relationship, Popović always took a pro-Internationalism and pro-Albanian stance. In 1943, he sent a letter the Central Committee of the CPY regarding the self-determination of Kosovo: "We have stressed the slogan of self-determination for the future. The Albanian people could not be mobilized against the 'liberator' occupier in this way... the CC of the CPY [must] take a concrete stand and define the form of the self-determination of the Albanians in Yugoslavia.".

== Sources ==
- Spasoje Đaković (1986). Sukobi na Kosovu. Narodna knjiga. ISBN 9788633100854.
