= Azem Vllasi =

Kosovar politician

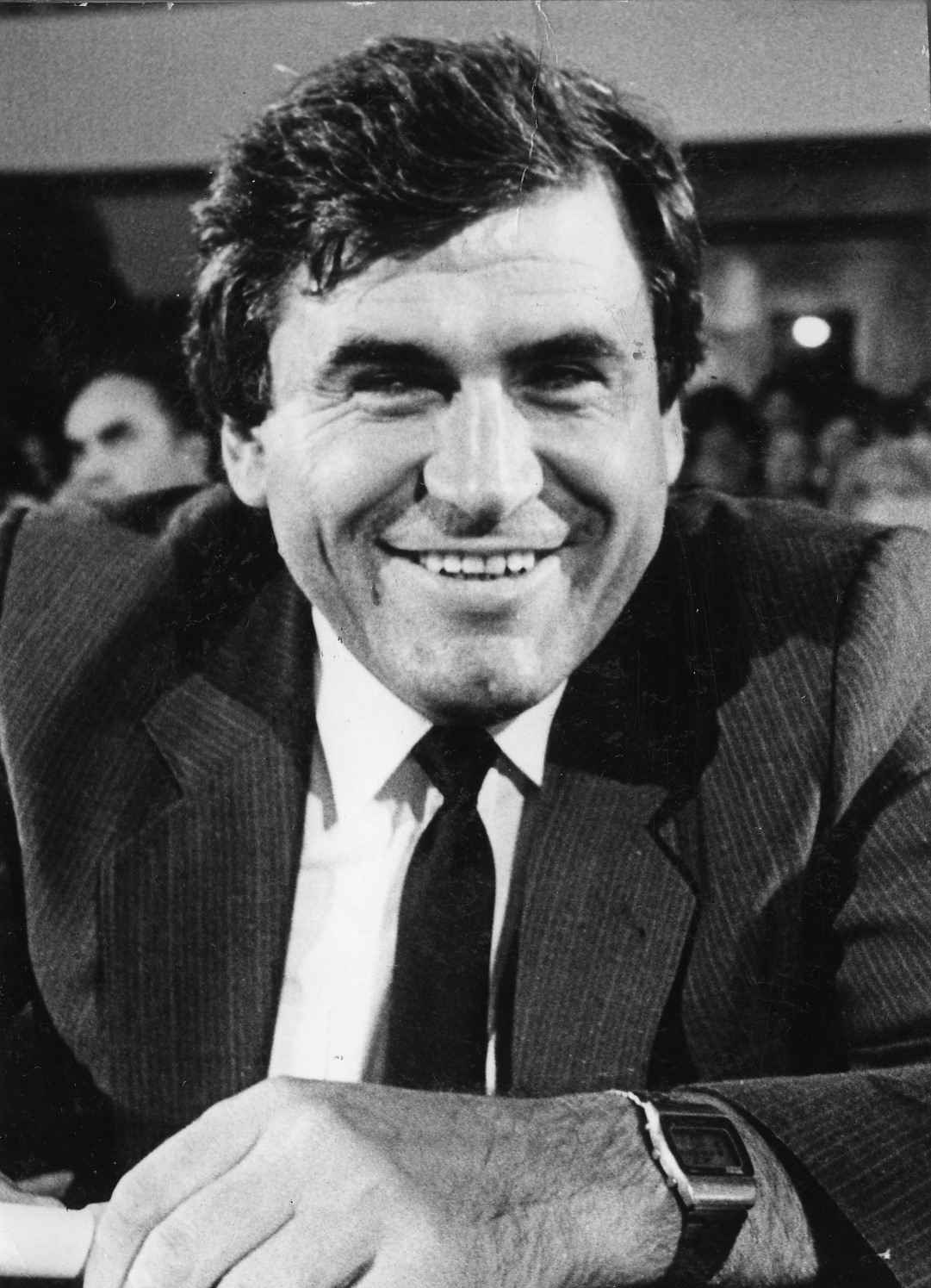

President of the League of Communists of Kosovo
- In office 29 April 1986 – 27 April 1988
- Preceded by: Kolë Shiroka
- Succeeded by: Kaqusha Jashari

Personal details
- Born: 23 December 1948 (age 77) Kosovska Kamenica, PR Serbia, FPR Yugoslavia (now Kamenica, Kosovo)
- Party: Kosovar Social Democratic (from 2004); Kosovar League of Communists (until 1989)
- Spouse: Nadira Avdić-Vllasi
- Profession: lawyer, politician

Azem Vllasi (born 23 December 1948) is a Kosovo Albanian politician and lawyer. He served as the president of the presidency of the Provincial Committee of the League of Communists of Kosovo (LKK) from 29 April 1986 to 27 April 1988. A critic of Slobodan Milošević, Vllasi was removed from power amidst the anti-bureaucratic revolution. He later became a lawyer and political consultant.

== Early years ==
Vllasi was born in Robovac, Kosovska Kamenica, Yugoslavia, in today's Kosovo. In his youth and student years, Vllasi chaired a number of youth organizations: the student league of Kosovo and of Yugoslavia, and from 1974, the League of Socialist Youth of Yugoslavia. As socialist youth chairman, he became popular and gained the support of President Tito, which helped him to become the first re-elected youth leader. After graduation, he became a lawyer before joining big politics. In 1980, he publicly challenged the autocratic ruler of Albania, Enver Hoxha, claiming that ethnic Albanians in Yugoslavia were better off than people in Albania and describing his rule as brutal and dictatorial. Azem Vllasi was a Chevening Scholarship holder in early 1970s and studied at the University of Cambridge in the United Kingdom.

== Leader of Kosovo and dismissal ==
Later on, Vllasi became a member of the central committee of the League of Communists of Yugoslavia and became the leader of the League of Communists of Kosovo in 1986. Under Vllasi, the Albanian-led Party took a more assertive position towards the Serbian government, and could be expected to put up strong opposition to any moves to reassert Serbian authority over Kosovo. The autonomous province of Kosovo at the time had an equal vote in the federal presidency of Yugoslavia with the Yugoslav republics, and its own executive body, legislature, and judiciary.

In November 1988, Kaqusha Jashari, who had succeeded Vllasi as LKK president in April, and Vlassi himself were toppled in the Anti-bureaucratic revolution because of their unwillingness to accept the constitutional amendments curbing Kosovo's autonomy, and replaced by supporters of Slobodan Milošević, the leader of the League of Communists of Serbia at the time. In response to this, the local population started a series of public demonstrations and a general strike, particularly the 1989 Kosovo miners' strike.

A partial state of emergency in Kosovo was declared on February 27, 1989, and the newly appointed leaders resigned on February 28. Soon thereafter, Kosovo's legislature, under a threat of force authorised by the federal presidency, acquiesced and passed the amendments allowing Serbia to assert its authority over Kosovo. Vllasi was arrested by the police on the charges of "counter-revolutionary activities". He was released from the Točak prison in Titova Mitrovica in April 1990.

== Today ==
Vllasi survived the war years and works today as a lawyer, author, and political adviser/consultant. He is a member of the Social Democratic Party of Kosovo (PSDK). In December 2005, Kosovo's prime minister Bajram Kosumi appointed Vllasi as special adviser for negotiations over the final status of Kosovo. Vllasi also served as a political advisor to Kosovo's prime minister Agim Çeku.

Vllasi is married to Nadira Avdić-Vllasi, a Bosniak journalist. They have two children, Adem, a practicing attorney in the United States, and Selma, a medical practitioner who also lives and works in the United States.

=== Assassination attempt ===
On 13 March 2017, Vllasi was wounded in an attack at the entrance of his office where he worked as a lawyer. The would-be assassin, Murat Jashari, was later arrested together with an accomplice. Jashari was sentenced to psychiatric treatment at the Institute of Forensic Psychiatry in Pristina, where he died of cancer on 3 March 2021.

| Preceded by Slobodan Filipović | President of the Yugoslav Olympic Committee; 1982 – 1983 | Succeeded by Zdravko Mutin |
