= Veli Deva =

Senior communist leader

Veli Deva (October 18, 1924, Gjakova – November 25, 2015, Pristina) was a senior communist leader in Kosovo under the Socialist Federal Republic of Yugoslavia.

== Biography ==
He attended primary school in Albania, then went on to study political science in Belgrade and economics in Skopje. He achieved greater autonomy for the province of Kosovo in 1974 and directed its main economic engine, the Trepča Mines. However, in the wake of the 1981 protests in Kosovo, he was deemed disloyal and dismissed from his position as Provincial Committee Chair before being arrested.
