= President of the Executive Council of SAP Kosovo =

Head of Executive Council of SAP Kosovo

President of the Executive Council of Socialist Autonomous Province of Kosovo
- Style: Chairman/Chairwoman
- Formation: 1945
- First holder: Fadil Hoxha
- Final holder: Jusuf Zejnullahu
- Abolished: 5 July 1990
- Succession: Prime Minister of Kosovo

The president of the Executive Council of the Socialist Autonomous Province of Kosovo (Serbo-Croatian: Predsjednik Izvršnog vijeća Socijalističke Autonomne Pokrajine Kosovo, Albanian: Kryetari i Këshillit Ekzekutiv të Krahinës Socialiste Autonome të Kosovës) was the head of the executive body of the Socialist Autonomous Province of Kosovo responsible for provincial affairs and for supervising the implementation of laws from 1945 to 1990.

== Officeholders ==
In the Socialist Autonomous Province of Kosovo, which was at the time one of the two socialist autonomous provinces of the Socialist Republic of Serbia and one of the federal units of the Socialist Federal Republic of Yugoslavia, a single-party system was in place. During this time there were eight heads of state, all from the ranks of the League of Communists of Yugoslavia (SKJ). The federal party was organized into six sub-organizations – the republic parties, one for each of the six federal republics. Kosovan politicians and presidents of the executive council of the period were members of the League of Communists of Yugoslavia through their membership in the League of Communists of Kosovo (SKK), the Kosovan part of the federal party (as was respectively the case with all Yugoslav politicians).

Party

KPK/SKK

No.	Name (Birth–Death)	Portrait	Term of office		Political party
Chairman of the Executive Council of the People's Committee 1945–1953
1	Fadil Hoxha (1916–2001)		1945	February 1953	Communist Party renamed in 1952 to League of Communists
Chairmen of the Executive Council 1953–1990
1	Fadil Hoxha (1916–2001)		February 1953	June 1963	League of Communists
2	Ali Šukrija (1919–2005)		June 1963	May 1967	League of Communists
3	Ilija Vakić (1932–2023)		May 1967	May 1974	League of Communists
4	Bogoljub Nedeljković (1920–1986)		May 1974	May 1978	League of Communists
5	Bahri Oruçi (1930–2011)		May 1978	25 September 1981	League of Communists
6	Riza Sapunxhiu (1925–2008)		25 September 1981	May 1982	League of Communists
7	Imer Pula (1921–2010)		May 1982	5 May 1984	League of Communists
8	Ljubomir Neđo Borković (1926–2009)		5 May 1984	May 1986	League of Communists
9	Namzi Mustafa (born 1941)		May 1986	1987	League of Communists
10	Kaqusha Jashari (1946–2025)		10 March 1987	9 May 1989	League of Communists
11	Nikolla Shkreli (born 1944)		9 May 1989	1989	League of Communists
12	Daut Jashanica (1948–2020)		1989	4 December 1989	League of Communists
13	Jusuf Zejnullahu (born 1944)		4 December 1989	5 July 1990	League of Communists

== See also ==
- List of rulers of Kosovo
- Prime Minister of Kosovo
- President of the Presidency of SAP Kosovo
- President of the Assembly of SAP Kosovo
