= Breakup of Yugoslavia =

1991–92 Balkan political conflict

- Part of the Revolutions of 1989 and the Yugoslav Wars
- Animated series of maps showing the breakup of the SFR Yugoslavia and subsequent developments, from 1989 through 2008. The colors represent the different areas of control.: Socialist Federal Republic of Yugoslavia (1945–92); Slovenia (25 June 1991–); Croatia (25 June 1991–); Republic of Serbian Krajina (1991–95; became a part of Croatia after Operation Storm); Republic of North Macedonia (1991–; named "Republic of Macedonia" until 2019); Republic of Bosnia and Herzegovina (1992–95; became a part of Bosnia and Herzegovina); Croatian Republic of Herzeg-Bosnia (1991–94; became a part of Bosnia and Herzegovina); Republika Srpska (1992–95; became part of Bosnia and Herzegovina); Federal Republic of Yugoslavia (1992–2003; reconstructed into the "State Union of Serbia and Montenegro" in 2003–06); Autonomous Province of Western Bosnia (1991–94; became a part of Bosnia and Herzegovina); Bosnia and Herzegovina (1995–); UN Transitional Administration in Eastern Slavonia, Baranja and Western Syrmia (1996–1998; became a part of Croatia); Montenegro (3 June 2006–); Serbia (5 June 2006–); Kosovo (17 February 2008–; only partially recognised, claimed by Serbia)
- Date: 25 June 1991 – 27 April 1992 (10 months and 2 days)
- Location: SFR Yugoslavia; (Socialist Republic of Croatia) →Croatia; (Socialist Republic of Slovenia) →Slovenia; (Socialist Republic of Bosnia and Herzegovina) → Bosnia and Herzegovina; (Socialist Republic of Macedonia) → Republic of Macedonia; (Federal Republic of Yugoslavia) FR Yugoslavia; (Socialist Republic of Serbia) → Serbia; (Socialist Republic of Montenegro) → Montenegro Unrecognized breakaway states: Serbian Krajina; Republika Srpska; Dubrovnik Republic; Herzeg-Bosnia; Western Bosnia; Republic of Kosova
- Outcome: Dissolution of Yugoslavia and formation of independent successor states; Continuation of the Yugoslav Wars until 2001.

After a period of political and economic crisis in the 1980s, the constituent republics of the Socialist Federal Republic of Yugoslavia split apart in the early 1990s. Unresolved issues from the breakup caused a series of inter-ethnic Yugoslav Wars from 1991 to 2001 which primarily affected Bosnia and Herzegovina, neighbouring parts of Croatia and, some years later, Kosovo.

Following the Allied victory in World War II, Yugoslavia was set up as a federation of six republics, with borders drawn along ethnic and historical lines: Bosnia and Herzegovina, Croatia, Macedonia, Montenegro, Serbia, and Slovenia. In addition, two autonomous provinces were established within Serbia: Vojvodina and Kosovo. Each of the republics had its own branch of the League of Communists of Yugoslavia party and a ruling elite, and any tensions were solved on the federal level. The Yugoslav model of state organisation, as well as a "middle way" between planned and liberal economy, had been a relative success, and the country experienced a period of strong economic growth and relative political stability up to the 1980s, under Josip Broz Tito. After his death in 1980, the weakened system of federal government was left unable to cope with rising economic and political challenges.

In the 1980s, Kosovo Albanians started to demand that Serbian autonomous province Kosovo and Metohija be granted the status of a full constituent republic, starting with the 1981 protests. Ethnic tensions between Albanians and Kosovo Serbs remained high over the whole decade, which resulted in the growth of Serb opposition to the high autonomy of provinces and ineffective system of consensus at the federal level across Yugoslavia, which were seen as an obstacle for Serb interests. In 1987, Slobodan Milošević came to power in Serbia, and was met with opposition by party leaders of the western constituent republics of Slovenia and Croatia, who also advocated greater democratisation of the country in line with the Revolutions of 1989 in Eastern Europe. The League of Communists of Yugoslavia dissolved in January 1990 along federal lines. Republican communist organisations became the separate socialist parties.

During 1990, the socialists (former communists) lost power to ethnic separatist parties in the first multi-party elections held across the country, except in Montenegro and in Serbia, where Milošević and his allies won. Nationalist rhetoric on all sides became increasingly heated. Between June 1991 and April 1992, four constituent republics declared independence while Montenegro and Serbia remained federated. Germany took the initiative and recognized the independence of Croatia and Slovenia, but the status of ethnic Serbs outside Serbia and Montenegro, and that of ethnic Croats outside Croatia, remained unsolved. After a string of inter-ethnic incidents, the Yugoslav Wars ensued, with the most severe conflicts being in Croatia and in Bosnia and Herzegovina. The wars left economic and political damage in the region that is still felt decades later. On 27 April 1992, the Federal Council of the Assembly of the SFRY, based on the decision of the Assembly of the Republic of Serbia and the Assembly of Montenegro, adopted the Constitution of the Federal Republic of Yugoslavia, which formally ended the breakup and set up the rump Federal Republic of Yugoslavia in place of its now-defunct precursor.

== Background ==
Yugoslavia occupied a significant portion of the Balkan Peninsula, including a strip of land on the east coast of the Adriatic Sea, stretching southward from the Bay of Trieste in Central Europe to the mouth of Bojana as well as Lake Prespa inland, and eastward as far as the Iron Gates on the Danube and Midžor in the Balkan Mountains, thus including a large part of Southeast Europe, a region with a history of ethnic conflict.

The important elements that fostered the discord involved contemporary and historical factors, including the formation of the Kingdom of Yugoslavia, the first breakup and subsequent inter-ethnic and political wars and genocide during World War II, ideas of Greater Albania, Greater Croatia and Greater Serbia and conflicting views about Pan-Slavism, and the unilateral recognition by a newly reunited Germany of the breakaway republics.

Before World War II, major tensions arose from the first, monarchist Yugoslavia's multi-ethnic make-up and relative political and demographic domination of the Serbs. Fundamental to the tensions were the different concepts of the new state. The Croats and Slovenes envisaged a federal model where they would enjoy greater autonomy than they had as a separate crown land under Austria-Hungary. Under Austria-Hungary, both Slovenes and Croats enjoyed autonomy with free hands only in education, law, religion, and 45% of taxes. The Serbs tended to view the territories as a just reward for their support of the allies in World War I and the new state as an extension of the Kingdom of Serbia.

Tensions between the Croats and Serbs often erupted into open conflict, with the Serb-dominated security structure exercising oppression during elections and the assassination in the National Assembly of Croat political leaders, including Stjepan Radić, who opposed the Serbian monarch's absolutism. The assassination and human rights abuses were subject of concern for the Human Rights League and precipitated voices of protest from intellectuals, including Albert Einstein. It was in this environment of oppression that the radical insurgent group (later fascist dictatorship) the Ustaše were formed.

During World War II, the country's tensions were exploited by the occupying Axis forces which established a Croat puppet state spanning much of present-day Croatia and Bosnia and Herzegovina. The Axis powers installed the Ustaše as the leaders of the Independent State of Croatia.

The Ustaše resolved that the Serbian minority were a fifth column of Serbian expansionism and pursued a policy of persecution against the Serbs. The policy dictated that one-third of the Serbian minority were to be killed, one-third expelled, and one-third converted to Catholicism and assimilated as Croats. Conversely, Serbian Royalist Chetniks pursued their own campaign of persecution against non-Serbs in parts of Bosnia and Herzegovina, Croatia and Sandžak per the Moljević plan ("On Our State and Its Borders") and the orders issues by Draža Mihailović which included "[t]he cleansing of all nation understandings and fighting".

Both Croats and Muslims were recruited as soldiers by the SS (primarily in the 13th Waffen Mountain Division). At the same time, former royalist, General Milan Nedić, was installed by the Axis as head of the puppet government in the German-occupied area of Serbia, and local Serbs were recruited into the Gestapo and the Serbian Volunteer Corps, which was linked to the German Waffen-SS. Both quislings were confronted and eventually defeated by the communist-led, anti-fascist Partisan movement composed of members of all ethnic groups in the area, leading to the formation of the Socialist Federal Republic of Yugoslavia.

The official Yugoslav post-war estimate of victims in Yugoslavia during World War II was 1,704,000. Subsequent data gathering in the 1980s by historians Vladimir Žerjavić and Bogoljub Kočović showed that the actual number of dead was about 1 million. Of that number, 330,000 to 390,000 ethnic Serbs perished from all causes in Croatia and Bosnia. These same historians also established the deaths of 192,000 to 207,000 ethnic Croats and 86,000 to 103,000 Muslims from all affiliations and causes throughout Yugoslavia.

Prior to its collapse, Yugoslavia was a regional industrial power and an economic success. From 1960 to 1980, annual gross domestic product (GDP) growth averaged 6.1 percent, medical care was free, literacy was 91 percent, and life expectancy was 72 years. Prior to 1991, Yugoslavia's armed forces were amongst the best-equipped in Europe.

Yugoslavia was a unique state, straddling both the East and West. Moreover, its president, Josip Broz Tito, was one of the fundamental founders of the "third world" or "group of 77" which acted as an alternative to the superpowers. More importantly, Yugoslavia acted as a buffer state between the West and the Soviet Union and also prevented the Soviets from getting a toehold on the Mediterranean Sea.

The central government's control began to be loosened due to increasing nationalist grievances and the Communist's Party's wish to support "national self determination". This resulted in Kosovo being turned into an autonomous region of Serbia, legislated by the 1974 constitution. This constitution broke down powers between the capital and the autonomous regions in Vojvodina (an area of Yugoslavia with a large number of ethnic minorities) and Kosovo (with a large ethnic-Albanian population).

Despite the federal structure of the new Yugoslavia, there was still tension between the federalists, primarily Croats and Slovenes who argued for greater autonomy, and unitarists, primarily Serbs. The struggle would occur in cycles of protests for greater individual and national rights (such as the Croatian Spring) and subsequent repression. The 1974 constitution was an attempt to short-circuit this pattern by entrenching the federal model and formalising national rights.

The loosened control basically turned Yugoslavia into a de facto confederacy, which also placed pressure on the legitimacy of the regime within the federation. Since the late 1970s a widening gap of economic resources between the developed and underdeveloped regions of Yugoslavia severely deteriorated the federation's unity. The most developed republics, Croatia and Slovenia, rejected attempts to limit their autonomy as provided in the 1974 Constitution. Public opinion in Slovenia in 1987 saw better economic opportunity in independence from Yugoslavia than within it. There were also places that saw no economic benefit from being in Yugoslavia; for example, the autonomous province of Kosovo was poorly developed, and per capita GDP fell from 47 percent of the Yugoslav average in the immediate post-war period to 27 percent by the 1980s. It highlighted the vast differences in the quality of life in the different republics.

Economic growth was curbed due to Western trade barriers combined with the 1973 oil crisis. Yugoslavia subsequently fell into heavy IMF debt due to the large number of International Monetary Fund (IMF) loans taken out by the regime. As a condition of receiving loans, the IMF demanded the "market liberalisation" of Yugoslavia. By 1981, Yugoslavia had incurred $19.9 billion in foreign debt. Another concern was the level of unemployment, at 1 million by 1980. This problem was compounded by the general "unproductiveness of the South", which not only added to Yugoslavia's economic woes, but also irritated Slovenia and Croatia further.

== Causes ==
=== Structural problems ===
The SFR Yugoslavia was a conglomeration of eight federated entities, roughly divided along ethnic lines, including:

- Six republics:
  - Bosnia and Herzegovina
  - Croatia
  - Macedonia
  - Montenegro
  - Serbia
  - Slovenia
- Two autonomous provinces within Serbia:
  - Vojvodina
  - Kosovo

With the 1974 Constitution, the office of President of Yugoslavia was replaced with the Yugoslav Presidency, an eight-member collective head-of-state composed of representatives from six republics and, controversially, two autonomous provinces of the Socialist Republic of Serbia, SAP Kosovo and SAP Vojvodina.

Since the SFR Yugoslav federation was formed in 1945, the constituent Socialist Republic of Serbia (SR Serbia) included the two autonomous provinces of SAP Kosovo and SAP Vojvodina. With the 1974 constitution, the influence of the central government of SR Serbia over the provinces was greatly reduced, which gave them long-sought autonomy. The government of SR Serbia was restricted in making and carrying out decisions that would apply to the provinces. The provinces had a vote in the Yugoslav Presidency, which was not always cast in favor of SR Serbia. In Serbia, there was great resentment towards these developments, which the nationalist elements of the public saw as the "division of Serbia". The 1974 constitution not only exacerbated Serbian fears of a "weak Serbia, for a strong Yugoslavia" but also hit at the heart of Serbian national sentiment. A majority of Serbs saw – and still see – Kosovo as the "cradle of the nation", and would not accept the possibility of losing it to the majority Albanian population.

In an effort to ensure his legacy, Tito's 1974 constitution established a system of year-long presidencies, on a rotation basis out of the eight leaders of the republics and autonomous provinces. Tito's death would show that such short terms were highly ineffective. Essentially it left a power vacuum which was left open for most of the 1980s. In their book Free to Choose (1980), Milton Friedman and his wife Rose Friedman foretold: "Once the aged Marshal Tito dies, Yugoslavia will experience political instability that may produce a reaction toward greater authoritarianism or, far less likely, a collapse of existing collectivist arrangements". (Tito died soon after the book was published.)

=== Death of Tito and the weakening of Communism ===
On 4 May 1980, Tito's death was announced through state broadcasts across Yugoslavia. His death removed what many international political observers saw as Yugoslavia's main unifying force, and subsequently ethnic tension started to grow in Yugoslavia. The crisis that emerged in Yugoslavia was connected with the weakening of the Communist states in Eastern Europe towards the end of the Cold War, leading to the fall of the Berlin Wall in 1989. In Yugoslavia, the national communist party, officially called the League of Communists of Yugoslavia, had lost its ideological base.

In 1986, the Serbian Academy of Sciences and Arts (SANU) contributed significantly to the rise of nationalist sentiments, as it drafted the controversial SANU Memorandum protesting against the weakening of the Serbian central government.

The problems in the Serbian Socialist Autonomous Province of Kosovo between ethnic Serbs and Albanians grew exponentially. This, coupled with economic problems in Kosovo and Serbia as a whole, led to even greater Serbian resentment of the 1974 Constitution. Kosovo Albanians started to demand that Kosovo be granted the status of a constituent republic beginning in the early 1980s, particularly with the 1981 protests in Kosovo. This was seen by the Serbian public as a devastating blow to Serb pride because of the historic links that Serbians held with Kosovo. It was viewed that that secession would be devastating to Kosovar Serbs. This eventually led to the repression of the Albanian majority in Kosovo.

Meanwhile, the more prosperous republics of SR Slovenia and SR Croatia wanted to move towards decentralization and democracy.

The historian Basil Davidson contends that the "recourse to 'ethnicity' as an explanation [of the conflict] is pseudo-scientific nonsense". Even the degree of linguistic and religious differences "have been less substantial than instant commentators routinely tell us". Davidson agrees with Susan Woodward, who found the "motivating causes of the disintegration in economic circumstance and its ferocious pressures". Likewise, Sabine Rutar states that, “while antagonistic representations of the ethnic-national past indeed were heavily (mis-)used during the conflict, one must be careful not to turn these forceful categories of practice into categories of historical analysis”.

=== Economic collapse and the international climate ===
As President, Tito's policy was to push for rapid economic growth, and growth was indeed high in the 1970s. However, the over-expansion of the economy caused inflation and pushed Yugoslavia into economic recession.

A major problem for Yugoslavia was the heavy debt incurred in the 1970s, which proved to be difficult to repay in the 1980s. Yugoslavia's debt load, initially estimated at a sum equal to $6 billion U.S. dollars, instead turned out to be equivalent to $21 billion U.S. dollars, which was a colossal sum for a poor country. In 1984, the Reagan administration issued a classified document, National Security Decision Directive 133, expressing concern that Yugoslavia's debt load might cause the country to align with the Soviet bloc. The 1980s were a time of economic austerity as the International Monetary Fund (IMF) imposed stringent conditions on Yugoslavia, which caused much resentment toward the Communist elites who had so mismanaged the economy by recklessly borrowing money abroad. The policies of austerity also led to uncovering much corruption on the part of the elites, most notably with the "Agrokomerc affair" of 1987, when the Agrokomerc enterprise of Bosnia turned out to be the centre of a vast nexus of corruption running all across Yugoslavia, and that the managers of Agrokomerc had issued promissory notes equivalent to almost US$1 billion without collateral, forcing the state to assume responsibility for their debts when Agrokomerc finally collapsed. The rampant corruption in Yugoslavia, of which the "Agrokomerc affair" was merely the most dramatic example, did much to discredit the Communist system, as it was revealed that the elites were living luxurious lifestyles, well beyond the means of ordinary people, with money stolen from the public purse during a time of austerity. The problems imposed by heavy indebtedness and corruption had by the mid-1980s increasingly started to corrode the legitimacy of the Communist system, as ordinary people started to lose faith in the competence and honesty of the elites.

A wave of major strikes developed in 1987–88 as workers demanded higher wages to compensate for inflation, as the IMF mandated the end of various subsidies, and they were accompanied by denunciations of the entire system as corrupt. Finally, the politics of austerity brought to the fore tensions between the well off "have" republics like Slovenia and Croatia versus the poorer "have not" republics like Serbia. Both Croatia and Slovenia felt that they were paying too much money into the federal budget to support the "have not" republics, while Serbia wanted Croatia and Slovenia to pay more money into the federal budget to support them at a time of austerity. Increasingly, demands were voiced in Serbia for more centralisation in order to force Croatia and Slovenia to pay more into the federal budget, demands that were completely rejected in the "have" republics.

The relaxation of tensions with the Soviet Union after Mikhail Gorbachev became General Secretary of the Communist Party of the Soviet Union, the top position in 1985, meant that western nations were no longer willing to be generous with restructuring Yugoslavia's debts, as the example of a communist country outside of the Eastern Bloc was no longer needed by the West as a way of destabilising the Soviet bloc. The external status quo, which the Communist Party had depended upon to remain viable, was thus beginning to disappear. Furthermore, the failure of communism all over Central and Eastern Europe once again brought to the surface Yugoslavia's inner contradictions, economic inefficiencies (such as chronic lack of productivity, fuelled by the country's leaderships' decision to enforce a policy of full employment), and ethno-religious tensions. Yugoslavia's non-aligned status resulted in access to loans from both superpower blocs. This contact with the United States and the West opened up Yugoslavia's markets sooner than the rest of Central and Eastern Europe. The 1980s were a decade of Western economic ministrations.

A decade of frugality resulted in growing frustration and resentment against both the Serbian "ruling class", and the minorities who were seen to benefit from government legislation. Real earnings in Yugoslavia fell by 25% from 1979 to 1985. By 1988, emigrant remittances to Yugoslavia totalled over $4.5 billion (USD), and by 1989 remittances were $6.2 billion (USD), making up over 19% of the world's total.

In 1990, US policy insisted on the shock therapy austerity programme that was meted out to the ex-Comecon countries. Such a programme had been advocated by the IMF and other organisations "as a condition for fresh injections of capital."

== Rise of nationalism in Serbia (1987–1989) ==
=== Slobodan Milošević ===
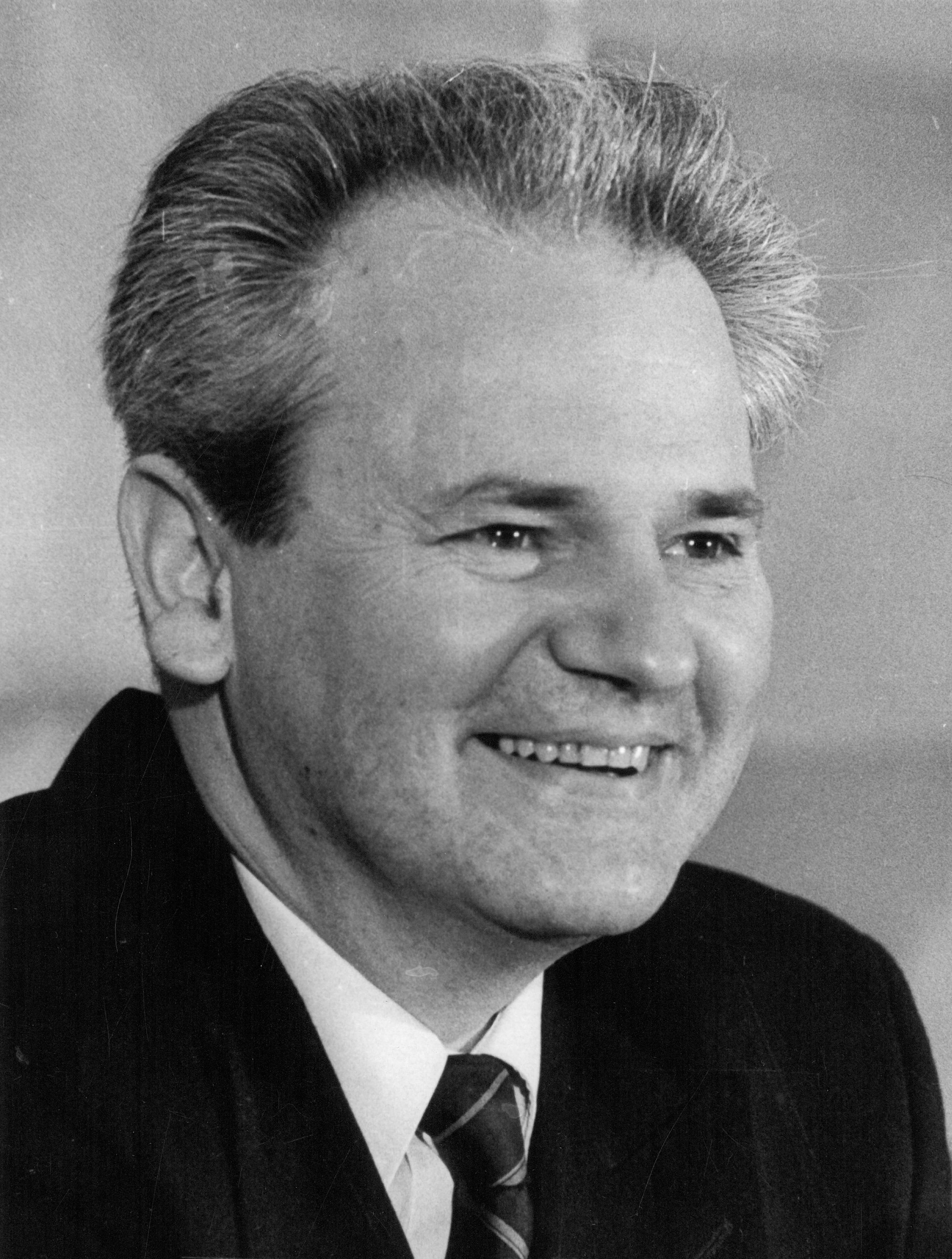
Serbian President Slobodan Milošević's unequivocal desire to uphold the unity of Serbs, a status which was threatened by each republic breaking away from the federation, in addition to his opposition to the Albanian authorities in Kosovo, further inflamed ethnic tensions.

In 1987, Serbian official Slobodan Milošević was sent to bring calm to an ethnically driven protest by Serbs against the Albanian administration of SAP Kosovo. Milošević had been, up to this point, a hard-line communist who had decried all forms of nationalism as treachery, such as condemning the SANU Memorandum as "nothing else but the darkest nationalism". However, Kosovo's autonomy had always been an unpopular policy in Serbia, and he took advantage of the situation and made a departure from traditional communist neutrality on the issue of Kosovo.

Milošević assured Serbs that their mistreatment by ethnic Albanians would be stopped. He then began a campaign against the ruling communist elite of SR Serbia, demanding reductions in the autonomy of Kosovo and Vojvodina. These actions made him popular amongst Serbs and aided his rise to power in Serbia. Milošević and his allies took on an aggressive nationalist agenda of reviving SR Serbia within Yugoslavia, promising reforms and protection of all Serbs.

The ruling party of SFR Yugoslavia was the League of Communists of Yugoslavia (SKJ), a composite political party made-up of eight Leagues of Communists from the six republics and two autonomous provinces. The League of Communists of Serbia (SKS) governed SR Serbia. Riding the wave of nationalist sentiment and his new popularity gained in Kosovo, Slobodan Milošević (Chairman of the League of Communists of Serbia (SKS) since May 1986) became the most powerful politician in Serbia by defeating his former mentor President of Serbia Ivan Stambolić at the 8th session of the Central Committee of the League of Communists of Serbia on 23–24 September 1987. At a 1988 rally in Belgrade, Milošević made clear his perception of the situation facing SR Serbia in Yugoslavia, saying:

At home and abroad, Serbia's enemies are massing against us. We say to them "We are not afraid. We will not flinch from battle".

— Slobodan Milošević, 19 November 1988.

On another occasion, he privately stated:

We Serbs will act in the interest of Serbia whether we do it in compliance with the constitution or not, whether we do it in compliance in the law or not, whether we do it in compliance with party statutes or not.

— Slobodan Milošević

=== Anti-bureaucratic revolution ===
The Anti-bureaucratic revolution was a series of protests in Serbia and Montenegro orchestrated by Milošević to put his supporters in SAP Vojvodina, SAP Kosovo, and the Socialist Republic of Montenegro (SR Montenegro) to power as he sought to oust his rivals. The government of Montenegro survived a coup d'état in October 1988, but not a second one in January 1989.

In addition to Serbia itself, Milošević could now install representatives of the two provinces and SR Montenegro in the Yugoslav Presidency Council. The very instrument that reduced Serbian influence before was now used to increase it: in the eight member Presidency, Milošević could count on a minimum of four votes – SR Montenegro (following local events), his own through SR Serbia, and now SAP Vojvodina and SAP Kosovo as well. In a series of rallies, called "Rallies of Truth", Milošević's supporters succeeded in overthrowing local governments and replacing them with his allies.

As a result of these events, in February 1989 ethnic Albanian miners in Kosovo organized a strike, demanding the preservation of the now-endangered autonomy. This contributed to ethnic conflict between the Albanian and Serb populations of the province. At 77% of the population of Kosovo in the 1980s, ethnic-Albanians were the majority.

In June 1989, the 600th anniversary of Serbia's historic defeat at the field of Kosovo, Slobodan Milošević gave the Gazimestan speech to 200,000 Serbs, with a Serb nationalist theme which deliberately evoked medieval Serbian history. Milošević's answer to the incompetence of the federal system was to centralise the government. Considering Slovenia and Croatia were looking farther ahead to independence, this was considered unacceptable.

=== Repercussions ===
Meanwhile, the Socialist Republic of Croatia (SR Croatia) and the Socialist Republic of Slovenia (SR Slovenia), supported the Albanian miners and their struggle for recognition. Media in SR Slovenia published articles comparing Milošević to Italian fascist dictator Benito Mussolini. Milošević contended that such criticism was unfounded and amounted to "spreading fear of Serbia". Milošević's state-run media claimed in response that Milan Kučan, head of the League of Communists of Slovenia, was endorsing Kosovo and Slovene separatism. Initial strikes in Kosovo turned into widespread demonstrations calling for Kosovo to be made the seventh republic. This angered Serbia's leadership which proceeded to use police force, and later the federal army (the Yugoslav People's Army JNA) by order of the Serbian-controlled Presidency.

In February 1989 ethnic Albanian Azem Vllasi, SAP Kosovo's representative on the Presidency, was forced to resign and was replaced by an ally of Milošević. Albanian protesters demanded that Vllasi be returned to office, and Vllasi's support for the demonstrations caused Milošević and his allies to respond stating this was a "counter-revolution against Serbia and Yugoslavia", and demanded that the federal Yugoslav government put down the striking Albanians by force. Milošević's aim was aided when a huge protest was formed outside of the Yugoslav parliament in Belgrade by Serb supporters of Milošević who demanded that the Yugoslav military forces make their presence stronger in Kosovo to protect the Serbs there and put down the strike.

On 27 February, SR Slovene representative in the collective presidency of Yugoslavia, Milan Kučan, opposed the demands of the Serbs and left Belgrade for SR Slovenia where he attended a meeting in the Cankar Hall in Ljubljana, co-organized with the democratic opposition forces, publicly endorsing the efforts of Albanian protesters who demanded that Vllasi be released. In the 1995 BBC2 documentary The Death of Yugoslavia, Kučan claimed that in 1989, he was concerned that with the successes of Milošević's anti-bureaucratic revolution in Serbia's provinces as well as Montenegro, that his small republic would be the next target for a political coup by Milošević's supporters if the coup in Kosovo went unimpeded. Serbian state-run television denounced Kučan as a separatist, a traitor, and an endorser of Albanian separatism.

Serb protests continued in Belgrade demanding action in Kosovo. Milošević instructed communist representative Petar Gračanin to make sure the protest continued while he discussed matters at the council of the League of Communists, as a means to induce the other members to realize that enormous support was on his side in putting down the Albanian strike in Kosovo. Serbian parliament speaker Borisav Jović, a strong ally of Milošević, met with the current President of the Yugoslav Presidency, Bosnian representative Raif Dizdarević, and demanded that the federal government concede to Serbian demands. Dizdarević argued with Jović saying that "You [Serbian politicians] organized the demonstrations, you control it", Jović refused to take responsibility for the actions of the protesters. Dizdarević then decided to attempt to bring calm to the situation himself by talking with the protesters, by making an impassioned speech for unity of Yugoslavia saying:

Our fathers died to create Yugoslavia. We will not go down the road to national conflict. We will take the path of Brotherhood and Unity.

— Raif Dizdarević, 1989.

This statement received polite applause, but the protest continued. Later Jović spoke to the crowds with enthusiasm and told them that Milošević was going to arrive to support their protest. When Milošević arrived, he spoke to the protesters and jubilantly told them that the people of Serbia were winning their fight against the old party bureaucrats. A shout came from the crowd to "arrest Vllasi". Milošević pretended not to hear the demand correctly but declared to the crowd that anyone conspiring against the unity of Yugoslavia would be arrested and punished. The next day, with the party council pushed into submission to Serbia, Yugoslav army forces poured into Kosovo and Vllasi was arrested.

In March 1989, the crisis in Yugoslavia deepened after the adoption of amendments to the Serbian constitution that allowed the Serbian republic's government to re-assert effective power over the autonomous provinces of Kosovo and Vojvodina. Up until that time, a number of political decisions were legislated from within these provinces, and they had a vote on the Yugoslav federal presidency level (six members from the republics and two members from the autonomous provinces).

A group of Kosovo Serb supporters of Milošević who helped bring down Vllasi declared that they were going to Slovenia to hold "the Rally of Truth" which would decry Milan Kučan as a traitor to Yugoslavia and demand his ousting. However, the attempt to replay the anti-bureaucratic revolution in Ljubljana in December 1989 failed: the Serb protesters who were to go by train to Slovenia were stopped when the police of SR Croatia blocked all transit through its territory in coordination with the Slovene police forces.

In the Presidency of Yugoslavia, Serbia's Borisav Jović (at the time the President of the Presidency), Montenegro's Nenad Bućin, Vojvodina's Jugoslav Kostić and Kosovo's Riza Sapunxhiu, started to form a voting bloc.

== Final political crisis (1990–1992) ==
=== Party crisis ===
In January 1990, the extraordinary 14th Congress of the League of Communists of Yugoslavia was convened. The combined Yugoslav ruling party, the League of Communists of Yugoslavia (SKJ), was in crisis. Most of the Congress was spent with the Serbian and Slovene delegations arguing over the future of the League of Communists and Yugoslavia. SR Croatia prevented Serb protesters from reaching Slovenia. The Serbian delegation, led by Milošević, insisted on a policy of "one person, one vote" in the party membership, which would empower the largest party ethnic group, the Serbs.

In turn, the Croats and Slovenes sought to reform Yugoslavia by delegating even more power to six republics, but were voted down continuously in every motion and attempt to force the party to adopt the new voting system. As a result, the Croatian delegation, led by Chairman Ivica Račan, and Slovene delegation left the Congress on 23 January 1990, effectively dissolving the all-Yugoslav party. Along with external pressure, this caused the adoption of multi-party systems in all the republics.

=== Multi-party elections ===
The individual republics organized multi-party elections in 1990, and the former Communists mostly failed to win re-election, while most of the elected governments took on nationalist platforms, promising to protect their separate nationalist interests. In multi-party parliamentary elections nationalists defeated re-branded former Communist parties in Slovenia on 8 April 1990, in Croatia on 22 April and 2 May 1990, in Macedonia 11 and 25 November and 9 December 1990, and in Bosnia and Herzegovina on 18 and 25 November 1990.

In multi-party parliamentary elections, re-branded former Communist parties were victorious in Montenegro on 9 and 16 December 1990, and in Serbia on 9 and 23 December 1990. In addition Serbia re-elected Slobodan Milošević as president. Serbia and Montenegro now increasingly favored a Serb-dominated Yugoslavia.

=== Ethnic tensions in Croatia ===
1. Croats 78.1 (76.4%)
2. Serbs 12.2 (11.9%)
3. Yugoslavs 2.2 (2.15%)
4. Others 9.7 (9.49%)

In Croatia, the nationalist Croatian Democratic Union (HDZ) was elected to power, led by controversial nationalist Franjo Tuđman, under the promise of "protecting Croatia from Milošević", and publicly advocating Croatian sovereignty. Croatian Serbs were wary of Tuđman's nationalist government, and in 1990 Serb nationalists in the southern Croatian town of Knin organized and formed a separatist entity known as the SAO Krajina, which demanded remaining in union with the rest of the Serb population if Croatia decided to secede. The government of Serbia endorsed the rebellion of the Croatian Serbs, claiming that for Serbs, rule under Tuđman's government would be equivalent to the World War II era fascist Independent State of Croatia (NDH), which committed genocide against Serbs. Milošević used this to rally Serbs against the Croatian government and Serbian newspapers joined in the warmongering. Serbia had by now printed $1.8 billion worth of new money without any backing of the Yugoslav National Bank.

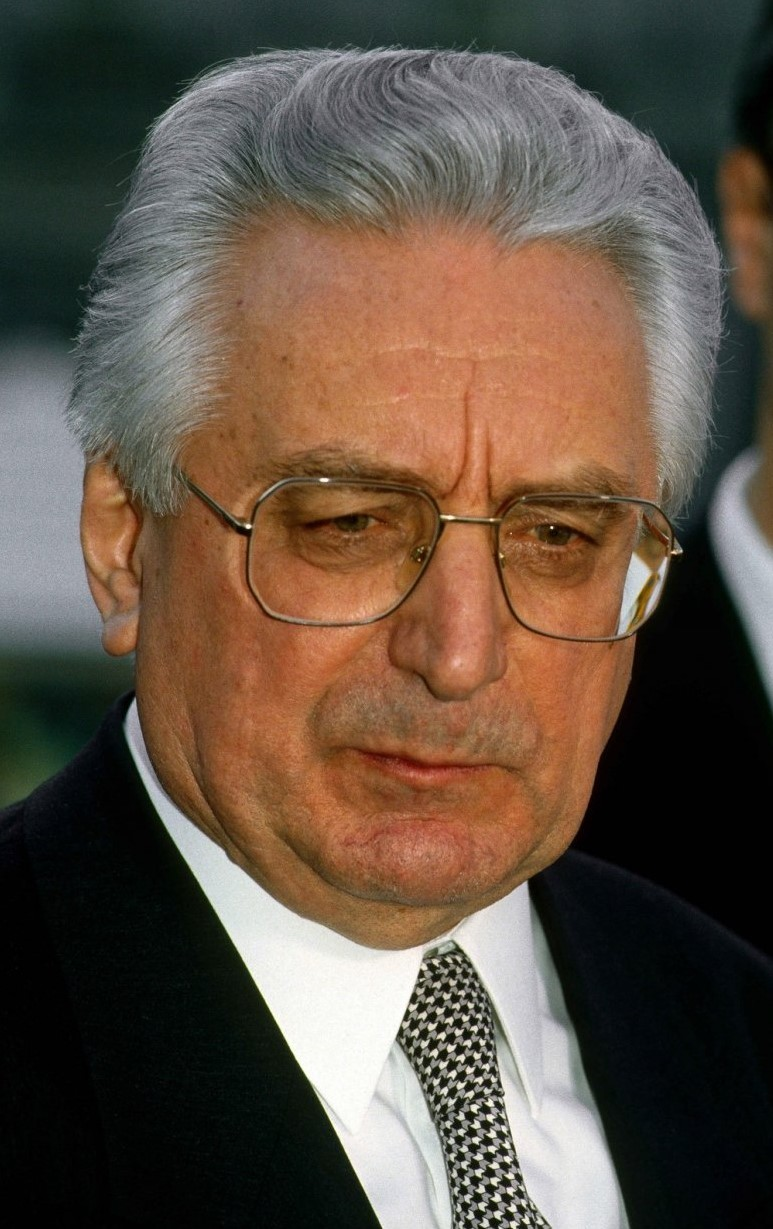
Croatian President Franjo Tuđman

Croatian Serbs in Knin, under the leadership of local police inspector Milan Martić, began to try to gain access to weapons so that the Croatian Serbs could mount a successful revolt against the Croatian government. In August 1990, Croatian Serb politicians including the Mayor of Knin met with Borisav Jović, the head of the Yugoslav Presidency, and urged him to push the council to take action to prevent Croatia from separating from Yugoslavia, because they claimed that the Serb population would be in danger in Croatia which was ruled by Tuđman and his nationalist government.

At the meeting, army official Petar Gračanin told the Croatian Serb politicians how to organize their rebellion, telling them to put up barricades, as well as assemble weapons of any sort, saying "If you can't get anything else, use hunting rifles." Initially the revolt became known as the "Log Revolution", as Serbs blocked roads to Knin with cut-down trees and prevented Croats from entering Knin or the Croatian coastal region of Dalmatia. The BBC documentary The Death of Yugoslavia revealed that at the time, Croatian TV dismissed the "Log Revolution" as the work of drunken Serbs, trying to diminish the serious dispute. However, the blockade was damaging to Croatian tourism. The Croatian government refused to negotiate with the Serb separatists and instead sent in armed special forces by helicopter to put down the rebellion.

Croatia claimed the helicopters were bringing "equipment" to Knin, but the federal Yugoslav Air Force (YAF) intervened and sent fighter jets to intercept them. The YAF ordered the helicopters return to their base or be fired on; the helicopters obeyed. To the Croatian government, this action by the YAF revealed that the Yugoslav People's Army was increasingly under Serbian control. SAO Krajina was officially declared a separate entity on 21 December 1990 by a Serbian National Council headed by Milan Babić.

In August 1990, in the wake of the Log Revolution, the Croatian Parliament replaced its representative in the Yugoslav Presidency, Stipe Šuvar, with Stjepan Mesić. Mesić was not seated in October 1990 because of protests from the Serbian side, and then joined Macedonia's Vasil Tupurkovski, Slovenia's Janez Drnovšek and Bosnia and Herzegovina's Bogić Bogićević in opposing demands to proclaim a general state of emergency, which would have allowed the Yugoslav People's Army to impose martial law.

Following the first multi-party election results, in the autumn of 1990 the republics of Slovenia, Croatia, and Macedonia proposed transforming Yugoslavia into a loose federation of six republics. Milošević rejected all such proposals, arguing that like Slovenes and Croats, the Serbs also had a right to self-determination. Serbian politicians were alarmed by a change of phrasing in the Christmas Constitution of Croatia that changed the status of ethnic Serbs of Croatia from an explicitly mentioned nation (narod) to a nation listed together with minorities (narodi i manjine).

=== Independence of Slovenia and Croatia ===
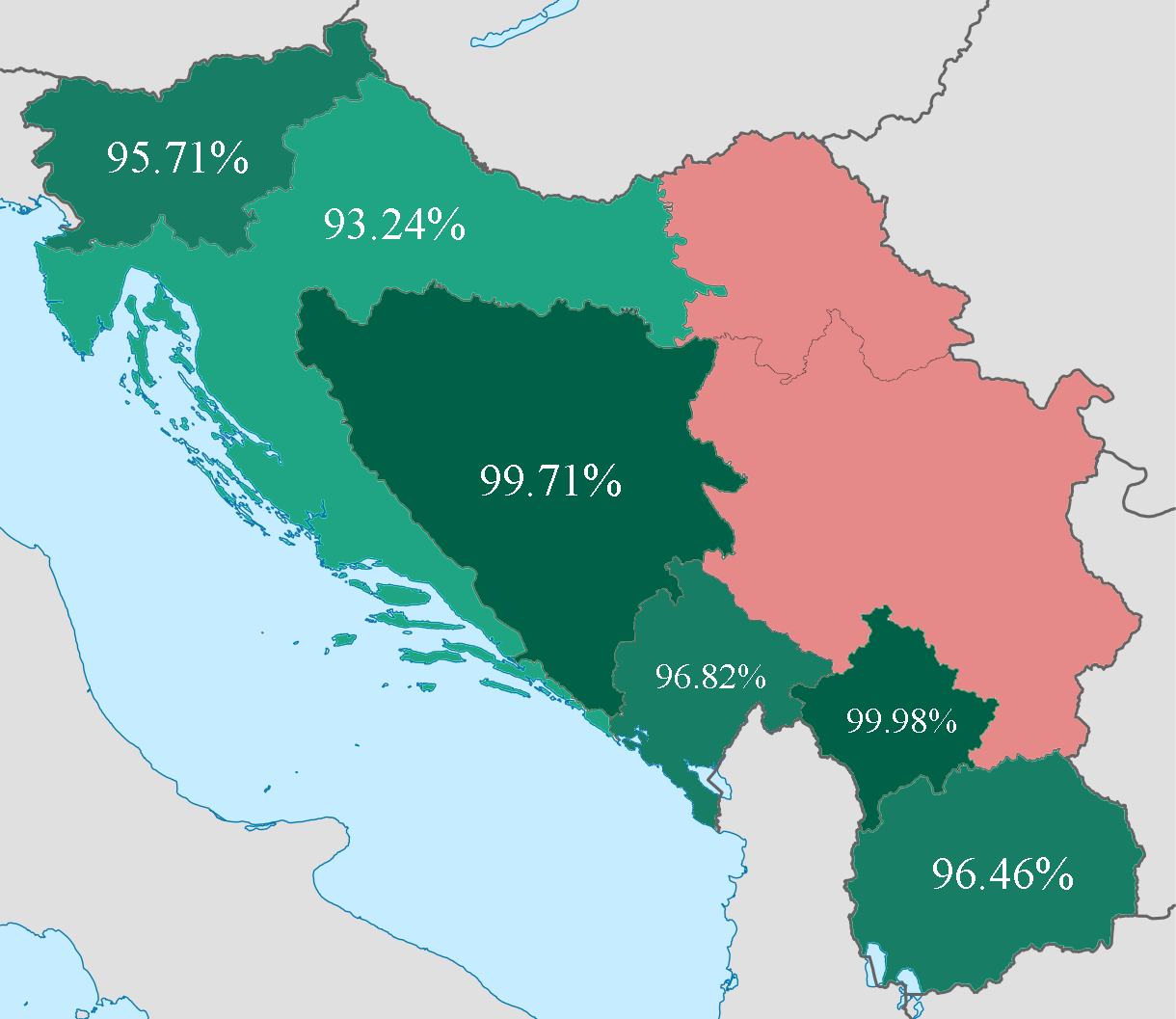
Independence referendums results in Yugoslavia between 1990–1992 and the percentage of votes in favor

In the 1990 Slovenian independence referendum, held on 23 December 1990, a vast majority of residents voted for independence: 88.5% of all electors (94.8% of those participating) voted for independence, which was declared on 25 June 1991.

In January 1991, the Yugoslav counter-intelligence service, KOS (Kontraobaveštajna služba), displayed a video of a secret meeting (the "Špegelj Tapes") that they purported had happened some time in 1990 between the Croatian Defence Minister, Martin Špegelj, and two other men. Špegelj announced during the meeting that Croatia was at war with the Yugoslav People's Army (JNA, Jugoslovenska Narodna Armija) and gave instructions about arms smuggling as well as methods of dealing with the Army's officers stationed in Croatian cities. The Army subsequently wanted to indict Špegelj for treason and illegal importation of arms, mainly from Hungary.

The discovery of Croatian arms smuggling combined with the crisis in Knin, the election of independence-leaning governments in Bosnia and Herzegovina, Croatia, Macedonia, and Slovenia, and Slovenes demanding independence in the referendum on the issue suggested that Yugoslavia faced the imminent threat of disintegration.

On 1 March 1991, the Pakrac clash ensued, and the JNA was deployed to the scene. On 9 March 1991, protests in Belgrade were suppressed with the help of the Army.

On 12 March 1991, the leadership of the Army met with the Presidency in an attempt to convince them to declare a state of emergency which would allow for the pan-Yugoslav army to take control of the country. Yugoslav army chief Veljko Kadijević declared that there was a conspiracy to destroy the country, saying:

An insidious plan has been drawn up to destroy Yugoslavia. Stage one is civil war. Stage two is foreign intervention. Then puppet regimes will be set up throughout Yugoslavia.

— Veljko Kadijević, 12 March 1991.

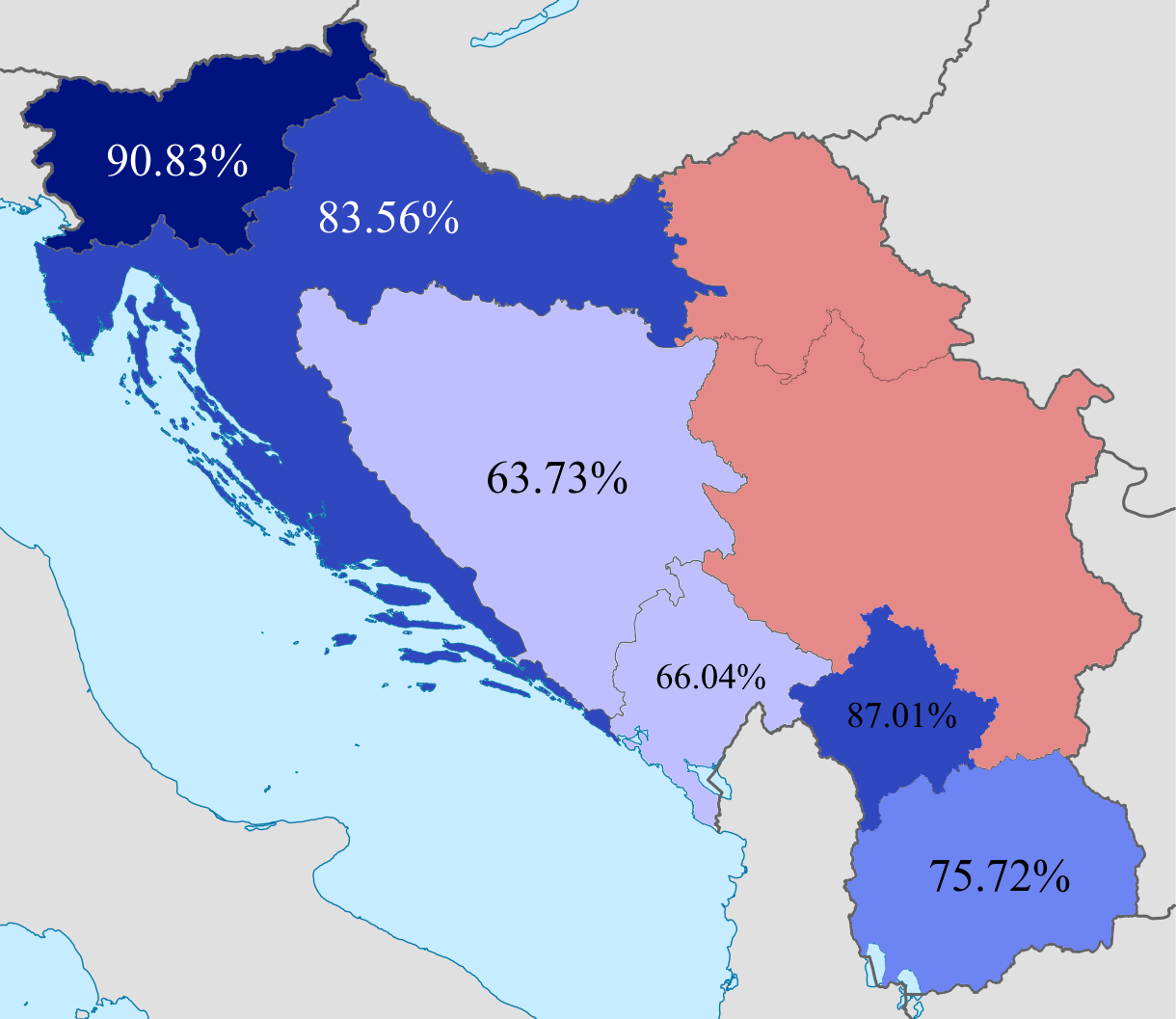
Percentage of turnouts during the 1990-1992 referendums in Yugoslavia

This statement effectively implied that the new independence-advocating governments of the republics were seen by Serbs as tools of the West. Croatian delegate Stjepan Mesić responded angrily to the proposal, accusing Jović and Kadijević of attempting to use the army to create a Greater Serbia and declared "That means war!". Jović and Kadijević then called upon the delegates of each republic to vote on whether to allow martial law, and warned them that Yugoslavia would likely fall apart if martial law was not introduced.

In the meeting, a vote was taken on a proposal to enact martial law to allow for military action to end the crisis in Croatia by providing protection for the Serbs. The proposal was rejected as the Bosnian delegate Bogić Bogićević voted against it, believing that there was still the possibility of diplomacy being able to solve the crisis.

The Yugoslav presidential crisis reached an impasse when Kosovo's Riza Sapunxhiu 'defected' his faction in the second vote on martial law in March 1991. Jović briefly resigned from the presidency in protest, but soon returned. On 16 May 1991, the Serbian parliament replaced Sapunxhiu with Sejdo Bajramović, and Vojvodina's Nenad Bućin with Jugoslav Kostić. This effectively deadlocked the Presidency, because Milošević's Serbian faction had secured four out of eight federal presidency votes, and it was able to block any unfavorable decisions at the federal level, in turn causing objections from other republics and calls for reform of the Yugoslav Federation.

After Jović's term as head of the collective presidency expired, he blocked his successor, Mesić, from taking the position, giving the position instead to Branko Kostić, a member of the pro-Milošević government in Montenegro.

In the Croatian independence referendum held on 2 May 1991, 93.24% voted for independence. On 19 May 1991, the second round of the referendum on the structure of the Yugoslav federation was held in Croatia. The phrasing of the question did not explicitly inquire as to whether one was in favor of secession or not. Voters were asked if they supported Croatia being "able to enter into an alliance of sovereign states with other republics (in accordance with the proposal of the republics of Croatia and Slovenia for solving the state crisis in the SFRY)?". 83.56% of the voters turned out, with Croatian Serbs largely boycotting the referendum. Of these, 94.17% (78.69% of the total voting population) voted "in favor" of the proposal, while 1.2% of those who voted were "opposed". Finally, the independence of Croatia was declared on 25 June 1991.

== The beginning of the Yugoslav Wars ==
=== War in Slovenia (1991) ===
Both Slovenia and Croatia declared their independence on 25 June 1991. This was declared unconstitutional by the Constitutional Court of Yugoslavia, as the 1974 Yugoslav Constitution required unanimity of all republics for the secession of any of the republics (Articles 5, 203, 237, 240, 244 and 281).

On the morning of 26 June, units of the Yugoslav People's Army's 13th Corps left their barracks in Rijeka, Croatia, to move towards Slovenia's borders with Italy. The move immediately led to a strong reaction from local Slovenians, who organized spontaneous barricades and demonstrations against the JNA's actions. There was no fighting, as yet, and both sides appeared to have an unofficial policy of not being the first to open fire.

By this time, the Slovenian government had already put into action its plan to seize control of both the international Ljubljana Airport and Slovenia's border posts on borders with Italy, Austria and Hungary. The personnel manning the border posts were, in most cases, already Slovenians, so the Slovenian take-over mostly simply amounted to changing of uniforms and insignia, without any fighting. By taking control of the borders, the Slovenians were able to establish defensive positions against an expected JNA attack. This meant that the JNA would have to fire the first shot, which was fired on 26 June at 14:30 in Divača by an officer of the JNA.

Whilst supportive of their respective rights to national self-determination, the European Community pressured Slovenia and Croatia to place a three-month moratorium on their independence, and reached the Brioni Agreement on 7 July 1991 (recognized by representatives of all republics). During these three months, the Yugoslav Army completed its pull-out from Slovenia. Negotiations to restore the Yugoslav federation with diplomat Lord Carrington and members of the European Community were all but ended. Carrington's plan realized that Yugoslavia was in a state of dissolution and decided that each republic must accept the inevitable independence of the others, along with a promise to Serbian President Milošević that the European Community would ensure that Serbs outside of Serbia would be protected.

Milošević refused to agree to the plan, as he claimed that the European Community had no right to dissolve Yugoslavia and that the plan was not in the interests of Serbs as it would divide the Serb people into four republics (Serbia, Montenegro, Bosnia and Herzegovina, and Croatia). Carrington responded by putting the issue to a vote in which all the other republics, including Montenegro under Momir Bulatović, initially agreed to the plan that would dissolve Yugoslavia. However, after intense pressure from Serbia on Montenegro's president, Montenegro changed its position to oppose the dissolution of Yugoslavia.

Lord Carrington's opinions were rendered moot following newly reunited Germany's Christmas Eve 1991 recognition of Slovenia and Croatia. Except for secret negotiations between foreign ministers Hans-Dietrich Genscher (Germany) and Alois Mock (Austria), the unilateral recognition came as an unwelcome surprise to most EC governments and the United States, with whom there was no prior consultation. International organisations, including the United Nations, were nonplussed. While Yugoslavia was already in a shambles, it is likely that German recognition of the breakaway republics—and Austrian partial mobilization on the border—made things a good deal worse for the decomposing multinational state. US President George H.W. Bush was the only major power representative to voice an objection. The extent of Vatican and Federal Intelligence Agency of Germany (BND) intervention in this episode has been explored by scholars familiar with the details, but the historical record remains disputed.

=== War in Croatia (1991) ===
With the Plitvice Lakes incident of late March/early April 1991, the Croatian War of Independence broke out between the Croatian government and the rebel ethnic Serbs of the Serbian Autonomous Province of Krajina (heavily backed by the by-now Serb-controlled Yugoslav People's Army). On 1 April 1991, the SAO Krajina declared that it would secede from Croatia. Immediately after Croatia's declaration of independence, Croatian Serbs also formed the SAO Western Slavonia and the SAO of Eastern Slavonia, Baranja and Western Srijem. These three regions would combine into the self-proclaimed proto-state Republic of Serbian Krajina (RSK) on 19 December 1991.

The other significant Serb-dominated entities in eastern Croatia announced that they too would join SAO Krajina. Zagreb had by this time discontinued submitting tax money to Belgrade, and the Croatian Serb entities in turn halted paying taxes to Zagreb. In some places, the Yugoslav Army acted as a buffer zone, in others it aided Serbs in their confrontation with the new Croatian army and police forces.

The influence of xenophobia and ethnic hatred in the collapse of Yugoslavia became clear during the war in Croatia. Propaganda by Croatian and Serbian sides spread fear, claiming that the other side would engage in oppression against them and would exaggerate death tolls to increase support from their populations. In the beginning months of the war, the Serb-dominated Yugoslav army and navy deliberately shelled civilian areas of Split and Dubrovnik, a UNESCO World Heritage Site, as well as nearby Croat villages. Yugoslav media claimed that the actions were done due to what they claimed was a presence of fascist Ustaše forces and international terrorists in the city.

UN investigations found that no such forces were in Dubrovnik at the time. Croatian Armed Forces presence increased later on. Montenegrin Prime Minister Milo Đukanović, at the time an ally of Milošević, appealed to Montenegrin nationalism, promising that the capture of Dubrovnik would allow the expansion of Montenegro into the city which he claimed was historically part of Montenegro, and denounced the present borders of Montenegro as being "drawn by the old and poorly educated Bolshevik cartographers".

At the same time, the Serbian government contradicted its Montenegrin allies with claims by the Serbian Prime Minister Dragutin Zelenović that Dubrovnik was historically Serbian, not Montenegrin. The international media gave immense attention to bombardment of Dubrovnik and claimed this was evidence of Milosevic pursuing the creation of a Greater Serbia as Yugoslavia collapsed, presumably with the aid of the subordinate Montenegrin leadership of Bulatović and Serb nationalists in Montenegro to foster Montenegrin support for the retaking of Dubrovnik.

In Vukovar, ethnic tensions between Croats and Serbs exploded into violence when the Yugoslav army entered the town. The Yugoslav army and Serbian paramilitaries devastated the town in urban warfare and the destruction of Croatian property. Serb paramilitaries committed atrocities against Croats, killing over 200, and displacing others to add to those who fled the town in the Vukovar massacre.

== Independence of Bosnia and Herzegovina ==
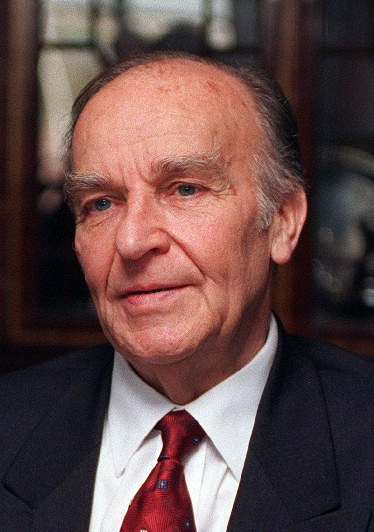
Bosnian Muslim leader Alija Izetbegović

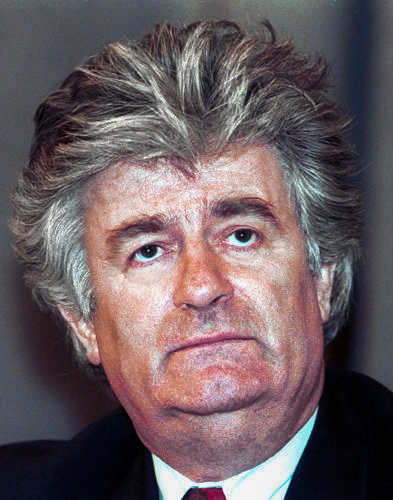
Bosnian Serb leader Radovan Karadžić

From 1991 to 1992, the situation in multiethnic Bosnia and Herzegovina grew tense due to its mixed demographic structure, which included a plurality of Bosniaks and minorities of Serbs and Croats. This ethnic divide led to the parliament being fragmented along ethnic lines and put the ownership of large areas of the country in dispute. In October 1991, Radovan Karadžić, the leader of the largest Serb faction in the parliament, the Serb Democratic Party, gave a grave and direct warning to the People's Assembly of Bosnia and Herzegovina should it decide to separate, saying:

This, what you are doing, is not good. This is the path that you want to take Bosnia and Herzegovina on, the same highway of hell and death that Slovenia and Croatia went on. Don't think that you won't take Bosnia and Herzegovina into hell, and the Muslim people maybe into extinction. Because the Muslim people cannot defend themselves if there is war here.

— Radovan Karadžić, 14 October 1991.

In the meantime, behind the scenes, negotiations began between Milošević and Tuđman to divide Bosnia and Herzegovina into Serb and Croat administered territories to attempt to avert war between Bosnian Croats and Bosnian Serbs. Bosnian Serbs held a referendum in November 1991 resulting in an overwhelming vote in favor of staying in a common state with Serbia and Montenegro.

In public, pro-state media in Serbia claimed to Bosnians that Bosnia and Herzegovina could be included a new voluntary union within a new Yugoslavia based on democratic government, but this was not taken seriously by Bosnia and Herzegovina's government.

On 9 January 1992, the Bosnian Serb assembly proclaimed a separate Republic of the Serb people of Bosnia and Herzegovina (the soon-to-be Republika Srpska), and proceeded to form Serbian autonomous regions (SARs) throughout the state. The Serbian referendum on remaining in Yugoslavia and the creation of SARs were proclaimed unconstitutional by the government of Bosnia and Herzegovina.

A referendum on independence sponsored by the Bosnian government was held on 29 February and 1 March 1992. The referendum was declared contrary to the Bosnian and federal constitution by the federal Constitution Court and the newly established Bosnian Serb government, and it was largely boycotted by the Bosnian Serbs. According to the official results, the turnout was 63.4%, and 99.7% of the voters voted for independence. It was unclear what the two-thirds majority requirement actually meant and whether it was satisfied.

The executive council building in Sarajevo in flames after being hit by Serbian artillery in 1992

Bosnia and Herzegovina declared independence on 3 March 1992 and received international recognition the following month on 6 April 1992. On the same date, the Serbs responded by declaring the independence of the Republika Srpska and laying siege to Sarajevo, which marked the start of the Bosnian War. The Republic of Bosnia and Herzegovina was subsequently admitted as a member state of the United Nations on 22 May 1992.

In Bosnia and Herzegovina, NATO airstrikes against Bosnian Serb targets contributed to the signing of the 14 December 1995 Dayton Agreement and the resolution of the conflict. About 100,000 people were killed over the course of the war.

== Independence of the Republic of Macedonia ==
In the Macedonian independence referendum held on 8 September 1991, 95.26% voted for independence, which was declared on 25 September 1991.

Five hundred US soldiers were then deployed under the UN banner to monitor Macedonia's northern border with Serbia. However, Belgrade's authorities neither intervened to prevent Macedonia's departure, nor protested nor acted against the arrival of the UN troops, indicating that once Belgrade was to form its new country (the Federal Republic of Yugoslavia in April 1992), it would recognise the Republic of Macedonia and develop diplomatic relations with it. As a result, Macedonia became the only former republic to gain sovereignty without resistance from the Yugoslav authorities and Army.

In addition, Macedonia's first president, Kiro Gligorov, did indeed maintain good relations with Belgrade as well as the other former republics. There have been no problems between Macedonian and Serbian border police, even though small pockets of Kosovo and the Preševo valley complete the northern reaches of the historical region known as Macedonia, which would otherwise have created a border dispute (see also IMORO).

The insurgency in the Republic of Macedonia, the last major conflict being between Albanian nationalists and the government of Republic of Macedonia, reduced in violence after 2001.

== International recognition of the breakup ==
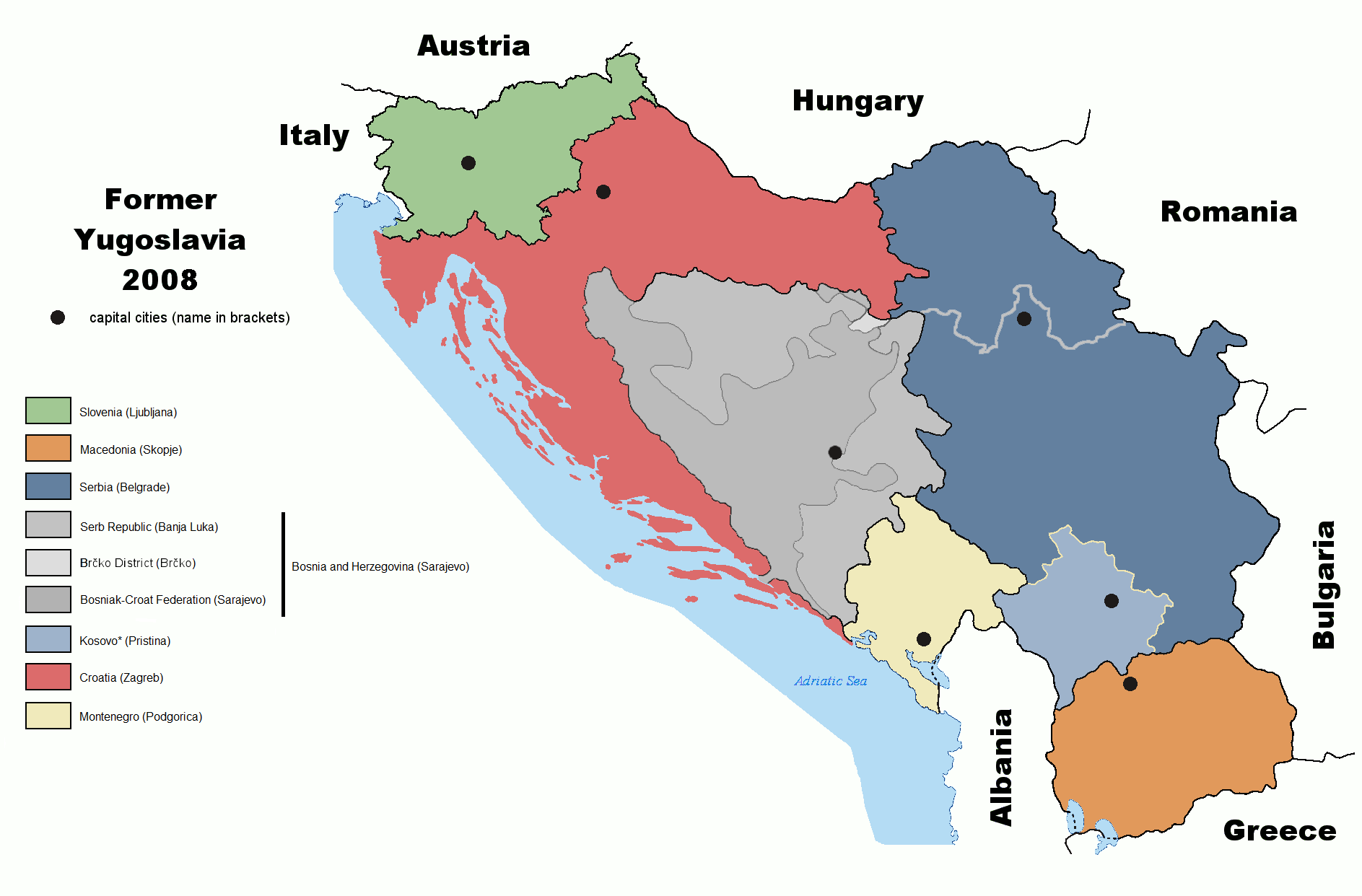
State entities on the former territory of SFR Yugoslavia, 2008

While France, the United Kingdom and most other European Community member nations were still emphasizing the need to preserve the unity of Yugoslavia, the German chancellor Helmut Kohl led the charge to recognize the first two breakaway republics of Slovenia and Croatia. He lobbied both national governments and the EC to be more favourable to his policies, and also went to Belgrade to pressure the federal government not to use military action, threatening sanctions. Days before the end of the year on Christmas Eve, Germany recognized the independence of Slovenia and Croatia, "against the advice of the European Community, the UN, and US President George H W Bush".

In November 1991, the Arbitration Commission of the Peace Conference on Yugoslavia, led by Robert Badinter, concluded at the request of Lord Carrington that the SFR Yugoslavia was in the process of dissolution, that the Serbian population in Croatia and Bosnia did not have a right to self-determination in the form of new states, and that the borders between the republics were to be recognized as international borders. As a result of the conflict, the United Nations Security Council unanimously adopted UN Security Council Resolution 721 on 27 November 1991, which paved the way to the establishment of peacekeeping operations in Yugoslavia.

In January 1992, Croatia and Yugoslavia signed an armistice under UN supervision, while negotiations continued between Serb and Croat leaderships over the partitioning of Bosnia and Herzegovina.

On 15 January 1992, the independence of Croatia and Slovenia was recognized by the international community. Slovenia, Croatia, and Bosnia and Herzegovina would later be admitted as member states of the United Nations on 22 May 1992. Macedonia was admitted as a member state of the United Nations on 8 April 1993; its membership approval took longer than the others due to Greek objections.

In 1999, Social Democratic Party of Germany leader Oskar Lafontaine criticised the role played by Germany in the break up of Yugoslavia, with its early recognition of the independence of the republics, during his May Day speech.

Some observers opined that the break up of the Yugoslav state violated the principles of post-Cold War system, enshrined in the Organization for Security and Co-operation in Europe (CSCE/OSCE) and the Treaty of Paris of 1990. Both stipulated that inter-state borders in Europe should not be changed. Some observers, such as Peter Gowan, assert that the breakup and subsequent conflict could have been prevented if western states were more assertive in enforcing internal arrangements between all parties, but ultimately "were not prepared to enforce such principles in the Yugoslav case because Germany did not want to, and the other states did not have any strategic interest in doing so." Gowan even contends that the break-up "might have been possible without great bloodshed if clear criteria could have been established for providing security for all the main groups of people within the Yugoslav space."

In March 1992, during the US-Bosnian independence campaign, the politician and future president of Bosnia and Herzegovina Alija Izetbegović reached an EC brokered agreement with Bosnian Croats and Serbs on a three-canton confederal settlement. But, the US government, according to The New York Times, urged him to opt for a unitary, sovereign, independent state.

== Aftermath in Serbia and Montenegro ==
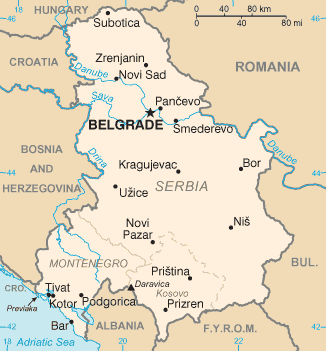
The Federal Republic of Yugoslavia consisted of Serbia and Montenegro.

The independence of Bosnia and Herzegovina proved to be the final blow to the pan-Yugoslav Socialist Federal Republic of Yugoslavia. On 28 April 1992, the Serb-dominated Federal Republic of Yugoslavia (FRY) was formed as a rump state, consisting only of the former Socialist Republics of Montenegro and Serbia. The FRY was dominated by Slobodan Milošević and his political allies. Its government claimed continuity to the former country, but the international community refused to recognize it as such. The stance of the international community was that Yugoslavia had dissolved into its separate states. The Federal Republic of Yugoslavia was prevented by a UN resolution on 22 September 1992 from continuing to occupy the United Nations seat as successor state to SFRY.

The disintegration and war led to a sanctions regime, causing the economy of Serbia and Montenegro to collapse after five years. The war in the western parts of former Yugoslavia ended in 1995 with US-sponsored peace talks in Dayton, Ohio, which resulted in the Dayton Agreement. The Kosovo War started in 1998 and ended with the 1999 NATO bombing of Yugoslavia; Slobodan Milošević was overthrown on 5 October 2000.

The question of succession was important for claims on SFRY's international assets, including embassies in many countries. The FRY did not abandon its claim to continuity from the SFRY until 1996. After the overthrow of Slobodan Milošević, the Federal Republic of Yugoslavia re-applied for membership in the United Nations and was admitted on 1 November 2000 as a new member. The Agreement on Succession Issues of the Former Socialist Federal Republic of Yugoslavia was then signed on 29 June 2001, leading to the sharing of international assets among the five sovereign equal successor states.

The FR Yugoslavia was reconstructed on 4 February 2003 as the State Union of Serbia and Montenegro. The State Union of Serbia and Montenegro was itself unstable, and finally broke up in 2006 when, in a referendum held on 21 May 2006, Montenegrin independence was backed by 55.5% of voters, and independence was declared on 3 June 2006. Serbia inherited the State Union's UN membership.

== See also ==
- Balkanisation
- Role of the media in the breakup of Yugoslavia
- Dissolution of Czechoslovakia
- Dissolution of the Soviet Union
- Timeline of the breakup of Yugoslavia

Region	until 1918	1918– 1929	1929– 1945	1941– 1945	1945– 1946	1946– 1963	1963– 1992	1992– 2003	2003– 2006	2006– 2008	since 2008
Slovenia	Part of Austria-Hungary including the Bay of Kotor See also: Kingdom of Croatia-Slavonia (1868–1918) Kingdom of Dalmatia (1815–1918) Condominium of Bosnia and Herzegovina (1878–1918)	State of Slovenes, Croats and Serbs (1918) Kingdom of Serbs, Croats and Slovenes (1918–1929) Kingdom of Yugoslavia (1929–1943) See also: Republic of Prekmurje (1919) Banat, Bačka and Baranja (1918–1919) Free State of Fiume (1920–1924) (1924–1945) Italian province of Zadar (1920–1947)		Annexed by Italy, Germany, and Hungary^{a}	Democratic Federal Yugoslavia (1943–1945) Federal People's Republic of Yugoslavia (1945–1963) Socialist Federal Republic of Yugoslavia (1963–1992) Consisted of the Socialist Republics of: Slovenia (1945–1991); Croatia (1945–1991); Bosnia and Herzegovina (1945–1992) Serbia (1945–1992) (included the autonomous provinces of Vojvodina and Kosovo) Montenegro (1945–1992); Macedonia (1945–1991) See also: Free Territory of Trieste (1947–1954)^{h}			Republic of Slovenia; Ten-Day War			
Dalmatia	Part of Austria-Hungary including the Bay of Kotor See also: Kingdom of Croatia-Slavonia (1868–1918) Kingdom of Dalmatia (1815–1918) Condominium of Bosnia and Herzegovina (1878–1918)	State of Slovenes, Croats and Serbs (1918) Kingdom of Serbs, Croats and Slovenes (1918–1929) Kingdom of Yugoslavia (1929–1943) See also: Republic of Prekmurje (1919) Banat, Bačka and Baranja (1918–1919) Free State of Fiume (1920–1924) (1924–1945) Italian province of Zadar (1920–1947)		Independent State of Croatia (1941–1945) Puppet state of Germany. Parts annexed by Italy. Međimurje and Baranja annexed by Hungary.	Democratic Federal Yugoslavia (1943–1945) Federal People's Republic of Yugoslavia (1945–1963) Socialist Federal Republic of Yugoslavia (1963–1992) Consisted of the Socialist Republics of: Slovenia (1945–1991); Croatia (1945–1991); Bosnia and Herzegovina (1945–1992) Serbia (1945–1992) (included the autonomous provinces of Vojvodina and Kosovo) Montenegro (1945–1992); Macedonia (1945–1991) See also: Free Territory of Trieste (1947–1954)^{h}			Republic of Croatia^{b} Croatian War of Independence			
Slavonia	Part of Austria-Hungary including the Bay of Kotor See also: Kingdom of Croatia-Slavonia (1868–1918) Kingdom of Dalmatia (1815–1918) Condominium of Bosnia and Herzegovina (1878–1918)	State of Slovenes, Croats and Serbs (1918) Kingdom of Serbs, Croats and Slovenes (1918–1929) Kingdom of Yugoslavia (1929–1943) See also: Republic of Prekmurje (1919) Banat, Bačka and Baranja (1918–1919) Free State of Fiume (1920–1924) (1924–1945) Italian province of Zadar (1920–1947)		Independent State of Croatia (1941–1945) Puppet state of Germany. Parts annexed by Italy. Međimurje and Baranja annexed by Hungary.	Democratic Federal Yugoslavia (1943–1945) Federal People's Republic of Yugoslavia (1945–1963) Socialist Federal Republic of Yugoslavia (1963–1992) Consisted of the Socialist Republics of: Slovenia (1945–1991); Croatia (1945–1991); Bosnia and Herzegovina (1945–1992) Serbia (1945–1992) (included the autonomous provinces of Vojvodina and Kosovo) Montenegro (1945–1992); Macedonia (1945–1991) See also: Free Territory of Trieste (1947–1954)^{h}			Republic of Croatia^{b} Croatian War of Independence			
Croatia	Part of Austria-Hungary including the Bay of Kotor See also: Kingdom of Croatia-Slavonia (1868–1918) Kingdom of Dalmatia (1815–1918) Condominium of Bosnia and Herzegovina (1878–1918)	State of Slovenes, Croats and Serbs (1918) Kingdom of Serbs, Croats and Slovenes (1918–1929) Kingdom of Yugoslavia (1929–1943) See also: Republic of Prekmurje (1919) Banat, Bačka and Baranja (1918–1919) Free State of Fiume (1920–1924) (1924–1945) Italian province of Zadar (1920–1947)		Independent State of Croatia (1941–1945) Puppet state of Germany. Parts annexed by Italy. Međimurje and Baranja annexed by Hungary.	Democratic Federal Yugoslavia (1943–1945) Federal People's Republic of Yugoslavia (1945–1963) Socialist Federal Republic of Yugoslavia (1963–1992) Consisted of the Socialist Republics of: Slovenia (1945–1991); Croatia (1945–1991); Bosnia and Herzegovina (1945–1992) Serbia (1945–1992) (included the autonomous provinces of Vojvodina and Kosovo) Montenegro (1945–1992); Macedonia (1945–1991) See also: Free Territory of Trieste (1947–1954)^{h}			Republic of Croatia^{b} Croatian War of Independence			
Bosnia	Part of Austria-Hungary including the Bay of Kotor See also: Kingdom of Croatia-Slavonia (1868–1918) Kingdom of Dalmatia (1815–1918) Condominium of Bosnia and Herzegovina (1878–1918)	State of Slovenes, Croats and Serbs (1918) Kingdom of Serbs, Croats and Slovenes (1918–1929) Kingdom of Yugoslavia (1929–1943) See also: Republic of Prekmurje (1919) Banat, Bačka and Baranja (1918–1919) Free State of Fiume (1920–1924) (1924–1945) Italian province of Zadar (1920–1947)		Independent State of Croatia (1941–1945) Puppet state of Germany. Parts annexed by Italy. Međimurje and Baranja annexed by Hungary.	Democratic Federal Yugoslavia (1943–1945) Federal People's Republic of Yugoslavia (1945–1963) Socialist Federal Republic of Yugoslavia (1963–1992) Consisted of the Socialist Republics of: Slovenia (1945–1991); Croatia (1945–1991); Bosnia and Herzegovina (1945–1992) Serbia (1945–1992) (included the autonomous provinces of Vojvodina and Kosovo) Montenegro (1945–1992); Macedonia (1945–1991) See also: Free Territory of Trieste (1947–1954)^{h}			Bosnia and Herzegovina^{c} Bosnian War Consists of the Federation of Bosnia and Herzegovina (since 1995), Republika Srpska (since 1995), and Brčko District (since 2000).			
Herzegovina	Part of Austria-Hungary including the Bay of Kotor See also: Kingdom of Croatia-Slavonia (1868–1918) Kingdom of Dalmatia (1815–1918) Condominium of Bosnia and Herzegovina (1878–1918)	State of Slovenes, Croats and Serbs (1918) Kingdom of Serbs, Croats and Slovenes (1918–1929) Kingdom of Yugoslavia (1929–1943) See also: Republic of Prekmurje (1919) Banat, Bačka and Baranja (1918–1919) Free State of Fiume (1920–1924) (1924–1945) Italian province of Zadar (1920–1947)		Independent State of Croatia (1941–1945) Puppet state of Germany. Parts annexed by Italy. Međimurje and Baranja annexed by Hungary.	Democratic Federal Yugoslavia (1943–1945) Federal People's Republic of Yugoslavia (1945–1963) Socialist Federal Republic of Yugoslavia (1963–1992) Consisted of the Socialist Republics of: Slovenia (1945–1991); Croatia (1945–1991); Bosnia and Herzegovina (1945–1992) Serbia (1945–1992) (included the autonomous provinces of Vojvodina and Kosovo) Montenegro (1945–1992); Macedonia (1945–1991) See also: Free Territory of Trieste (1947–1954)^{h}			Bosnia and Herzegovina^{c} Bosnian War Consists of the Federation of Bosnia and Herzegovina (since 1995), Republika Srpska (since 1995), and Brčko District (since 2000).			
Vojvodina	Part of the Délvidék region of Hungary	State of Slovenes, Croats and Serbs (1918) Kingdom of Serbs, Croats and Slovenes (1918–1929) Kingdom of Yugoslavia (1929–1943) See also: Republic of Prekmurje (1919) Banat, Bačka and Baranja (1918–1919) Free State of Fiume (1920–1924) (1924–1945) Italian province of Zadar (1920–1947)		Autonomous Banat^{d} (part of the German; Territory of the Military Commander in Serbia)	Democratic Federal Yugoslavia (1943–1945) Federal People's Republic of Yugoslavia (1945–1963) Socialist Federal Republic of Yugoslavia (1963–1992) Consisted of the Socialist Republics of: Slovenia (1945–1991); Croatia (1945–1991); Bosnia and Herzegovina (1945–1992) Serbia (1945–1992) (included the autonomous provinces of Vojvodina and Kosovo) Montenegro (1945–1992); Macedonia (1945–1991) See also: Free Territory of Trieste (1947–1954)^{h}			Federal Republic of Yugoslavia Consisted of the Republic of Serbia (1992–2006) and Republic of Montenegro (1992–2006) Included Kosovo and Metohija, under UN administration, without control since 1999	State Union of Serbia and Montenegro Included Kosovo, under UN administration	Republic of Serbia Included the autonomous provinces of Vojvodina and Kosovo and Metohija under UN administration	Republic of Serbia Includes the autonomous province of Vojvodina; Kosovo claim
Central Serbia	Kingdom of Serbia (1882–1918)	State of Slovenes, Croats and Serbs (1918) Kingdom of Serbs, Croats and Slovenes (1918–1929) Kingdom of Yugoslavia (1929–1943) See also: Republic of Prekmurje (1919) Banat, Bačka and Baranja (1918–1919) Free State of Fiume (1920–1924) (1924–1945) Italian province of Zadar (1920–1947)		Territory of the Military Commander in Serbia (1941–1944) ^{e}	Democratic Federal Yugoslavia (1943–1945) Federal People's Republic of Yugoslavia (1945–1963) Socialist Federal Republic of Yugoslavia (1963–1992) Consisted of the Socialist Republics of: Slovenia (1945–1991); Croatia (1945–1991); Bosnia and Herzegovina (1945–1992) Serbia (1945–1992) (included the autonomous provinces of Vojvodina and Kosovo) Montenegro (1945–1992); Macedonia (1945–1991) See also: Free Territory of Trieste (1947–1954)^{h}			Federal Republic of Yugoslavia Consisted of the Republic of Serbia (1992–2006) and Republic of Montenegro (1992–2006) Included Kosovo and Metohija, under UN administration, without control since 1999	State Union of Serbia and Montenegro Included Kosovo, under UN administration	Republic of Serbia Included the autonomous provinces of Vojvodina and Kosovo and Metohija under UN administration	Republic of Serbia Includes the autonomous province of Vojvodina; Kosovo claim
Kosovo	Part of the Kingdom of Serbia (1912–1918)	State of Slovenes, Croats and Serbs (1918) Kingdom of Serbs, Croats and Slovenes (1918–1929) Kingdom of Yugoslavia (1929–1943) See also: Republic of Prekmurje (1919) Banat, Bačka and Baranja (1918–1919) Free State of Fiume (1920–1924) (1924–1945) Italian province of Zadar (1920–1947)		Mostly annexed by Italian Albania (1941–1944) along with western Macedonia and south-eastern Montenegro	Democratic Federal Yugoslavia (1943–1945) Federal People's Republic of Yugoslavia (1945–1963) Socialist Federal Republic of Yugoslavia (1963–1992) Consisted of the Socialist Republics of: Slovenia (1945–1991); Croatia (1945–1991); Bosnia and Herzegovina (1945–1992) Serbia (1945–1992) (included the autonomous provinces of Vojvodina and Kosovo) Montenegro (1945–1992); Macedonia (1945–1991) See also: Free Territory of Trieste (1947–1954)^{h}			Federal Republic of Yugoslavia Consisted of the Republic of Serbia (1992–2006) and Republic of Montenegro (1992–2006) Included Kosovo and Metohija, under UN administration, without control since 1999	State Union of Serbia and Montenegro Included Kosovo, under UN administration	Republic of Serbia Included the autonomous provinces of Vojvodina and Kosovo and Metohija under UN administration	Republic of Kosovo
Metohija	Kingdom of Montenegro (1910–1918) Metohija controlled by Austria-Hungary 1915–1918	State of Slovenes, Croats and Serbs (1918) Kingdom of Serbs, Croats and Slovenes (1918–1929) Kingdom of Yugoslavia (1929–1943) See also: Republic of Prekmurje (1919) Banat, Bačka and Baranja (1918–1919) Free State of Fiume (1920–1924) (1924–1945) Italian province of Zadar (1920–1947)		Mostly annexed by Italian Albania (1941–1944) along with western Macedonia and south-eastern Montenegro	Democratic Federal Yugoslavia (1943–1945) Federal People's Republic of Yugoslavia (1945–1963) Socialist Federal Republic of Yugoslavia (1963–1992) Consisted of the Socialist Republics of: Slovenia (1945–1991); Croatia (1945–1991); Bosnia and Herzegovina (1945–1992) Serbia (1945–1992) (included the autonomous provinces of Vojvodina and Kosovo) Montenegro (1945–1992); Macedonia (1945–1991) See also: Free Territory of Trieste (1947–1954)^{h}			Federal Republic of Yugoslavia Consisted of the Republic of Serbia (1992–2006) and Republic of Montenegro (1992–2006) Included Kosovo and Metohija, under UN administration, without control since 1999	State Union of Serbia and Montenegro Included Kosovo, under UN administration	Republic of Serbia Included the autonomous provinces of Vojvodina and Kosovo and Metohija under UN administration	Republic of Kosovo
Montenegro and Brda	Kingdom of Montenegro (1910–1918) Metohija controlled by Austria-Hungary 1915–1918	State of Slovenes, Croats and Serbs (1918) Kingdom of Serbs, Croats and Slovenes (1918–1929) Kingdom of Yugoslavia (1929–1943) See also: Republic of Prekmurje (1919) Banat, Bačka and Baranja (1918–1919) Free State of Fiume (1920–1924) (1924–1945) Italian province of Zadar (1920–1947)		Protectorate of Montenegro^{f} (1941–1944)	Democratic Federal Yugoslavia (1943–1945) Federal People's Republic of Yugoslavia (1945–1963) Socialist Federal Republic of Yugoslavia (1963–1992) Consisted of the Socialist Republics of: Slovenia (1945–1991); Croatia (1945–1991); Bosnia and Herzegovina (1945–1992) Serbia (1945–1992) (included the autonomous provinces of Vojvodina and Kosovo) Montenegro (1945–1992); Macedonia (1945–1991) See also: Free Territory of Trieste (1947–1954)^{h}			Federal Republic of Yugoslavia Consisted of the Republic of Serbia (1992–2006) and Republic of Montenegro (1992–2006) Included Kosovo and Metohija, under UN administration, without control since 1999	State Union of Serbia and Montenegro Included Kosovo, under UN administration	Montenegro	
Vardar Macedonia	Part of the Kingdom of Serbia (1912–1918)	State of Slovenes, Croats and Serbs (1918) Kingdom of Serbs, Croats and Slovenes (1918–1929) Kingdom of Yugoslavia (1929–1943) See also: Republic of Prekmurje (1919) Banat, Bačka and Baranja (1918–1919) Free State of Fiume (1920–1924) (1924–1945) Italian province of Zadar (1920–1947)		Annexed by the Kingdom of Bulgaria (1941–1944)	Democratic Federal Yugoslavia (1943–1945) Federal People's Republic of Yugoslavia (1945–1963) Socialist Federal Republic of Yugoslavia (1963–1992) Consisted of the Socialist Republics of: Slovenia (1945–1991); Croatia (1945–1991); Bosnia and Herzegovina (1945–1992) Serbia (1945–1992) (included the autonomous provinces of Vojvodina and Kosovo) Montenegro (1945–1992); Macedonia (1945–1991) See also: Free Territory of Trieste (1947–1954)^{h}			Republic of North Macedonia^{g}			
^{a} Prekmurje annexed by Hungary.; ^{b} See also: SAO Kninska Krajina (1990) → SAO Krajina (1990–1991); and SAO Eastern Slavonia, Baranja and Western Syrmia (1990–1991), SAO Western Slavonia (1990–1991) and the Republic of Serbian Krajina (1990–1995), all replaced by the UN Transitional Administration for Eastern Slavonia, Baranja and Western Sirmium (1996–1998).; ^{c} See also: Republic of Bosnia and Herzegovina; Croatian Republic of Herzeg-Bosnia; and the Serbian Autonomous Oblasts (SAOs) of Bosanska Krajina, North-East Bosnia, Romanija and Herzegovina (1991–1992), which all combined to form the Serbian Republic of Bosnia and Herzegovina (1992–1995).; ^{d} Bačka was reannexed by Hungary (1941–1944), while Syrmia was annexed by the Independent State of Croatia (1941–1944).; ^{e} Including North Kosovo. See also: Republic of Užice.; ^{f} Annexed by Italy (1941–1943) and Germany (1943–1944). Smaller part annexed by the Independent State of Croatia (1941–1944).; ^{g} North Macedonia's official and constitutional name was the Republic of Macedonia until 2019. It was known in the United Nations as the former Yugoslav Republic of Macedonia because of a naming dispute with Greece.; ^{h} Free Territory was established in 1947. Its administration was divided into two areas (Zone A) and (Zone B). Free Territory was de facto taken over by Italy and SFRY in 1954.
