= President of the Presidency of SAP Kosovo =

Political office in Yugoslavia

President of the Presidency of Socialist Autonomous Province of Kosovo
- Style: Chairman
- Formation: 1 January 1944
- First holder: Mehmet Hoxha
- Final holder: Hysen Kajdomçaj
- Abolished: 18 March 1991
- Succession: President of Kosovo

The president of the Presidency of the Socialist Autonomous Province of Kosovo (Serbo-Croatian: Predsjednik Predsjedništva Socijalističke Autonomne Pokrajine Kosovo, Albanian: Kryetari i Kryesisë së Krahinës Socialiste Autonome të Kosovës) existed from its establishment in 1945 until its dissolution in 1991.

== Officeholders ==
In the Socialist Autonomous Province of Kosovo, which was at the time one of the two socialist autonomous provinces of the Socialist Republic of Serbia and one of the federal units of the Socialist Federal Republic of Yugoslavia, a single-party system was in place. During this time there were eight heads of state, all from the ranks of the League of Communists of Yugoslavia (SKJ). The federal party was organized into six sub-organizations – the republic parties, one for each of the six federal republics. Kosovan politicians and presidents of the presidency of the period were members of the League of Communists of Yugoslavia through their membership in the League of Communists of Kosovo (SKK), the Kosovan part of the federal party (as was respectively the case with all Yugoslav politicians).

Party

KPK/SKK

No.	Name (Birth–Death)	Portrait	Term of office		Political party
President of the People's Liberation Committee for Kosovo and Metohija 1944–1945
1	Mehmed Hoxha (1908–1987)		1 January 1944	11 July 1945	Communist Party
President of the Regional People's Liberation Committee of Kosovo and Metohija 1945–1963
1	Fadil Hoxha (1916–2001); 1st time		11 July 1945	20 February 1953	Communist Party renamed in 1952 to League of Communists
2	Ismet Shaqiri (1918–1986)		20 February 1953	12 December 1953	League of Communists
3	Đorđije Pajković (1917–1980)		12 December 1953	5 May 1956	League of Communists
4	Pavle Jovićević (1910–1985)		5 May 1956	4 April 1960	League of Communists
5	Dušan Mugoša (1914–1973)		4 April 1960	18 June 1963	League of Communists
President of the Assembly of the Autonomous Province of Kosovo and Metohija 1963–1969
6	Stanoje Akšić (1921–1970)		18 June 1963	24 June 1967	League of Communists
(1)	Fadil Hoxha (1916–2001); 2nd time		24 June 1967	7 May 1969	League of Communists
President of the Assembly of the Socialist Autonomous Province of Kosovo 1969–1974
7	Ilaz Kurteshi (1927–2016)		7 May 1969	May 1974	League of Communists
President of the Presidency of the Socialist Autonomous Province of Kosovo 1974–1991
8	Xhavid Nimani (1919–2000)		May 1974	14 July 1981	League of Communists
9	Ali Šukrija (1919–2005)		5 August 1981	1982	League of Communists
10	Kolë Shiroka (1922–1994)		1982	May 1983	League of Communists
11	Shefqet Nebih Gashi (born 1927)		May 1983	May 1985	League of Communists
12	Branislav Škembarević (1920–2003)		May 1985	May 1986	League of Communists
13	Bajram Selani (1938–2019)		May 1986	May 1988	League of Communists
14	Remzi Kolgeci (1947–2011)		May 1988	5 April 1989	League of Communists
15	Hysen Kajdomçaj (born 1943)		27 June 1989	18 March 1991	League of Communists

== See also ==
- List of rulers of Kosovo
- President of Kosovo
- President of the Executive Council of SAP Kosovo
- President of the Assembly of SAP Kosovo
