= List of heads of state of Kosovo =

This is a list of heads of state of Kosovo.

List of the presidents of the Presidency of SAP Kosovo (1974–1990):

- Xhavit Nimani, 1974–1981
- Ali Šukrija, 1981–1982
- Kolë Shiroka, 1982–1983
- Shefqet Nebih Kollomoni, 1983–1985
- Branislav Skembarević, 1985–1986
- Bajram Selani, 1986–1988
- Remzi Kolgeci, 1988–1989
- Hysen Kajdomçaj, 1989–1990

List of the presidents of Kosovo (from 1992):

- Ibrahim Rugova, 1992–2006 (died in office)
- Fatmir Sejdiu, 2006–2010
- Behgjet Pacolli, 2011
- Atifete Jahjaga, 2011–2016
- Hashim Thaçi, 2016–2020
- Vjosa Osmani, 2021–2026
- Albulena Haxhiu, 2026-2026
- Justina Shiroka Pula, 2026-present

== Literature ==
- Petrit Imami, Srbi i Albanci kroz vekove, Beograd, 2000
