= Xhavid Nimani =

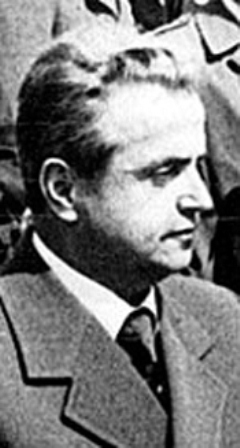

President of the Presidency of SAP Kosovo
- In office March 1974 – 14 July 1981
- Preceded by: Ilaz Kurteshi (as President of the Assembly)
- Succeeded by: Ali Šukrija

Personal details
- Born: 1 January 1919 Prizren, Kingdom of Serbs, Croats, and Slovenes
- Died: 13 December 2000 (aged 81)
- Party: League of Communists
- Profession: Politician

Xhavid Nimani (Serbian: Џавид Нимани; 1 January 1919 – 13 December 2000) was a Yugoslav politician who served as President of the Presidency of SAP Kosovo from March 1974 to July 1981.

== Biography ==
Nimani was born on 1 January 1919 in Prizren, Kingdom of Serbs, Croats, and Slovenes (present-day Kosovo). A Kosovo Albanian, he grew up at a time when there was significant discrimination in the region. He attended the Normal School and the Technical-Agricultural School in Elbasan, present-day Albania, and then the Technical School "Hari Fullci" in Tirana. Before entering politics, he worked by profession as a teacher.

Nimani joined the Yugoslav Partisans in 1941 and served in World War II. He was one of the political and military leaders of the LNÇK, which ran the anti-fascist resistance operations in Kosovo. He also helped establish National Liberation Councils (Këshillat nacionalçlirimtare), which were local governments set up by the resistance movement in the region, and was a member of the staff of the Albanian National Liberation Movement in Kosovo (Ushtria Nacionalçlirimtare). He was one of the delegates who attended the Bujan Conference and was one of the drafters of a resolution calling for the unification of Albania and Kosovo, although this ultimately did not materialize.

After the war, Nimani remained active in politics and was considered "a golden intellectual" by other Kosovars political figures, according to the newspaper Gazeta Telegraf, becoming known for his efforts to oppose Serbian influence among Kosovo Albanians. In 1948, he became a member of the Communist Party of Yugoslavia's Kosovo politburo before becoming a member of the Serbian central committee in 1949. In 1950, he became a member of the Presidency of the National Assembly of Yugoslavia. Nimani was elected to the reformed Federal Assembly of Yugoslavia in 1953 and served from 1954 to 1961 on the federal council committee for the national economy. He served as the organizational secretary of the League of Communists in Kosovo from 1961 to 1963 and then as a member of the executive committee of the party in Serbia from 1963 to 1966, while also being the vice president of the Serb assembly from 1963 to 1967 and becoming vice president of the federal assembly in 1967.

After the autonomy of Kosovo (then the Socialist Autonomous Province of Kosovo) was increased and the first constitution was adopted, Nimani was appointed the first President of the Presidency of SAP Kosovo in March 1974. He served seven years in the position. During his tenure, he helped advance education in Kosovo, with a university and several schools being established, and major reforms took place after the adopting of the 1974 constitution. After the 1981 protests in Kosovo, Nimani was forced to resign from his position. He died on 13 December 2000, at the age of 81.
