= President of the Assembly of SAP Kosovo =

President of the Assembly of Socialist Autonomous Province of Kosovo
- Style: Chairman
- Formation: 11 July 1945
- First holder: Fadil Hoxha
- Final holder: Đorđe Božović
- Abolished: 5 July 1990
- Succession: Speaker of the Assembly of Kosovo (2001)

The President of the Assembly of the Socialist Autonomous Province of Kosovo (Serbo-Croatian: Predsednici Skupštine Skupština Socijalističke Autonomne Pokrajine Kosovo, Albanian: Kryetari i Kuvendit të Krahinës Socialiste Autonome të Kosovës) was the presiding officer of the provincial legislature from 1945 to 1990.

== Officeholders ==
In the Socialist Autonomous Province of Kosovo, which was at the time one of the two socialist autonomous provinces of the Socialist Republic of Serbia and one of the federal units of the Socialist Federal Republic of Yugoslavia, a single-party system was in place. During this time there were eight heads of state, all from the ranks of the League of Communists of Yugoslavia (SKJ). The federal party was organized into six sub-organizations – the republic parties, one for each of the six federal republics. Kosovan politicians and presidents of the assembly of the period were members of the League of Communists of Yugoslavia through their membership in the League of Communists of Kosovo (SKK), the Kosovan part of the federal party (as was respectively the case with all Yugoslav politicians).

Party

KPK/SKK

No.	Name (Birth–Death)	Portrait	Term of office		Political party
President of the Regional Assembly of the Autonomous Province of Kosovo and Metohija
1	Fadil Hoxha (1916–2001); 1st time		11 July 1945	31 January 1946	Communist Party
President of the Regional People's Committee of the Autonomous Province of Kosovo and Metohija
(1)	Fadil Hoxha (1916–2001); 2nd time		31 January 1946	20 February 1953	Communist Party renamed in 1952 to League of Communists
2	Ismet Shaqiri (1918–1986)		20 February 1953	12 December 1953	League of Communists
3	Đorđije Pajković (1917–1980)		12 December 1953	5 May 1956	League of Communists
4	Pavle Jovićević (1910–1985)		5 May 1956	4 April 1960	League of Communists
5	Dušan Mugoša (1914–1973)		4 April 1960	18 June 1963	League of Communists
President of the Assembly of the Autonomous Province of Kosovo and Metohija
6	Stanoje Akšić (1921–1970)		18 June 1963	24 June 1967	League of Communists
(1)	Fadil Hoxha (1916–2001); 3rd time		24 June 1967	7 May 1969	League of Communists
President of the Assembly of the Socialist Autonomous Province of Kosovo
7	Ilaz Kurteshi (1927–2016)		7 May 1969	4 May 1978	League of Communists
8	Dušan Ristić (1928–2002)		4 May 1978	25 September 1981	League of Communists
9	Ilija Vakić (1932–2023)		25 September 1981	5 May 1983	League of Communists
10	Ilija Đukić (1930–2002)		5 May 1983	5 May 1984	League of Communists
11	Bajram Selimi (1930–2019)		5 May 1984	5 May 1986	League of Communists
12	Svetislav Dolašević (1926–1995)		5 May 1986	5 May 1988	League of Communists
13	Vukašin Jovanović (1939–2022)		5 May 1988	4 December 1989	League of Communists
14	Đorđe Božović		4 December 1989	5 July 1990	League of Communists

== See also ==
- President of the Assembly of Yugoslavia
