= Bogoljub Nedeljković =

Chairman of the Executive Council of the Socialist Autonomous Province of Kosovo

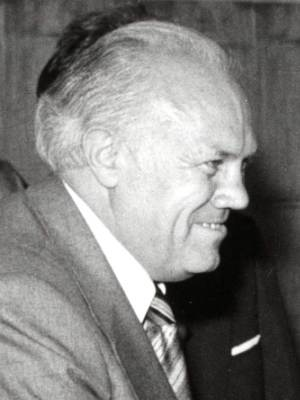

Bogoljub Nedeljković (Serbian Cyrillic: Богољуб Недељковић; Albanian: Bogolub Nedelkoviq, 3 September 1920 – 22 April 1986) served as Chairman of the Executive Council of the Socialist Autonomous Province of Kosovo within the former Yugoslavia from May 1974 to May 1978. He was succeeded in office by Bahri Oruçi.
