= Zhujë =

Zhujë Žuja
- Village
- Location in Kosovo
- Coordinates: 42.6861°N 21.6372°E
- Location: Kosovo
- District: Gjilan
- Municipality: Kamenicë
- Elevation: 839 m (2,753 ft)

Population (2024)
  - Total: 9
- Time zone: UTC+1 (CET)
  - Summer (DST): UTC+2 (CEST)

Zhujë is a village in Kamenica, Kosovo. All of its 42 inhabitants are Albanian.

== Notable people ==
- Sejdo Bajramović, acting president of Yugoslavia for a brief period in 1991
