= Ali Šukrija =

President of the Presidency of the LCY Central Committee
- In office 26 June 1984 – 25 June 1985
- Preceded by: Dragoslav Marković
- Succeeded by: Vidoje Žarković

2nd President of the Presidency of SAP Kosovo
- In office August 1981 – 1982
- Preceded by: Xhavid Nimani
- Succeeded by: Kolë Shiroka

2nd President of the Executive Council of SAP Kosovo
- In office June 1963 – May 1967
- Preceded by: Fadil Hoxha
- Succeeded by: Ilija Vakić

Personal details
- Born: 12 September 1919 Kosovska Mitrovica, Kingdom of Serbs, Croats and Slovenes
- Died: 6 January 2005 (aged 85) Belgrade, Serbia, Serbia and Montenegro
- Party: League of Communists of Kosovo

Ali Šukrija (Albanian: Ali Shukriu; 12 September 1919 – 6 January 2005) was a political figure of Kosovo, during its period as an autonomous province of Yugoslavia. He served as the 2nd Chairmen of the Executive Council of SAP Kosovo from 1963 until May 1967, 2nd President of the Presidency of SAP Kosovo from August 1981 to 1982 and lastly as the 7th President of the Presidency of the Central Committee of the League of Communists of Yugoslavia from 26 June 1984 until 25 June 1985.

== Early life ==
Ali Šukrija was born in Mitrovica, Kosovo and studied medicine at the University of Belgrade before World War II. He joined the communist movement in 1939, was arrested in 1941, but was then able to join the partisans. After the war, he studied at the Đuro Đaković high political school of Belgrade and was public prosecutor in Kosovo in 1945.

== Political career ==
Šukrija subsequently became Serbian minister of the interior and in 1950 was a member of the Serbian parliament. In his later political career, Šukrija was vice chairman of the executive council of Kosovo, and from 1963 to May 1967 succeeded Fadil Hoxha as chairman, becoming virtual prime minister of Kosovo. Following the purge of Xhavid Nimani in August 1981, he also served briefly, until 1982, as president of the presidium. Šukrija is remembered as a particularly pro-Yugoslav politician who served Belgrade loyally in the face of a rising Albanian nationalist movement. In 1989 he resigned from Kosovo's political structures during the miners' strike.

== Later life ==
Šukrija lived the rest of his life in retirement in Belgrade, until his death in 2005.

Political offices
Preceded by Dragoslav Marković	President of the Presidency of the League of Communists of Yugoslavia; 26 June 1984 – 25 June 1985	Succeeded by Vidoje Žarković
Preceded by Xhavid Nimani	President of the Presidency of SAP Kosovo; August 1981 – 1982	Succeeded by Kolë Shiroka
Preceded by Fadil Hoxha	President of the Executive Council of SAP Kosovo; June 1963 – May 1967	Succeeded by Ilija Vakić
