= Sejdo Bajramović =

Former Acting President of Yugoslavia

- Сејдо Бајрамовић
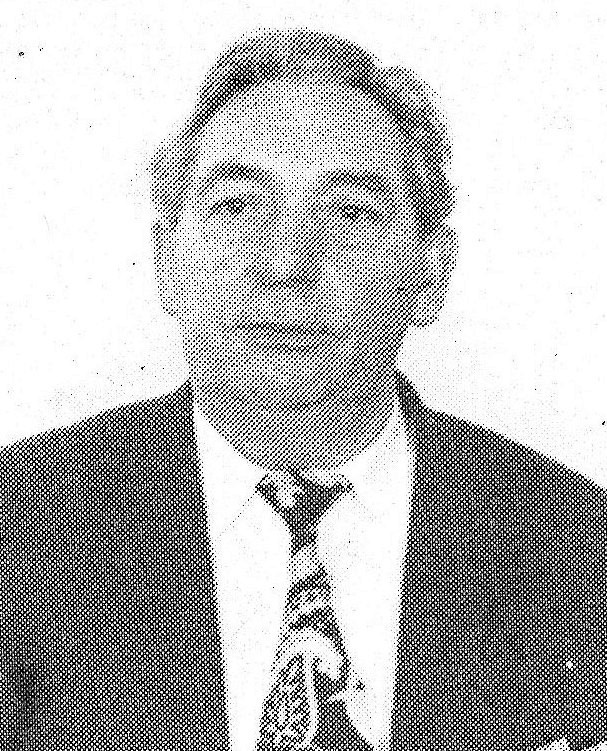

President of the Presidency of Yugoslavia (acting)
- In office 16 May 1991 – 30 June 1991
- Prime Minister: Ante Marković
- Preceded by: Borisav Jović
- Succeeded by: Stjepan Mesić

4th Kosovar member of the Yugoslav Presidency
- In office 31 March 1991 – 27 April 1992
- Preceded by: Riza Sapunxhiu
- Succeeded by: Post abolished

Personal details
- Born: 7 July 1927 Žuja, Kingdom of Serbs, Croats and Slovenes
- Died: 1993 (aged 65–66) Belgrade, Serbia, FR Yugoslavia
- Party: League of Communists of Yugoslavia; Socialist Party of Serbia

Military service
- Allegiance: Yugoslavia
- Branch/service: Yugoslav People's Army
- Rank: Warrant officer first class

Sejdo Bajramović (Albanian: Sejdo Bajramoviq or Bajrami; Serbian Cyrillic: Сејдо Бајрамовић; 7 July 1927 – 1993) was a Yugoslav soldier and politician of the former Yugoslavia, who was the acting head of state of the Socialist Federal Republic of Yugoslavia for a brief time in 1991.

Born in Kosovska Kamenica, Bajramović was elected as member of the presidency representing Kosovo, when the Serbian president Slobodan Milošević out-manoeuvred the incumbent Riza Sapunxhiu, through a recall by the Serbian Parliament. In the same move, he also became acting head of state (coordinator of the presidency of Yugoslavia, as Milošević initially refused to accept the President-designate Stipe Mesić, representing Croatia, and unilaterally declared the presidency incapable of functioning.

As the provincial legislature of Kosovo was suspended, Bajramović was appointed as presidency member by the Assembly of the Republic of Serbia. Delegates from Slovenia and Croatia as well as Kosovo Albanian delegates protested his appointment as illegitimate and anti-constitutional given only the provincial assembly could appoint the Kosovar member. In his Kosovo constituency, he had been elected with only 0.03% of the vote (ethnic Albanians boycotted the Serbian elections). Prior to this role, he was a warrant officer first class in the Yugoslav People's Army.
