= Battle of Peja =

- Part of World War II in Yugoslavia
Date	26–31 August 1944
Location	Pejë and surrounding villages, German occupied Albania (present-day Kosovo) 42°39′32″N 20°17′32″E
Result	Ballist victory: Temporary Albanian nationalist control over Peja; Yugoslav Partisans forced to withdraw

Belligerents
Balli Kombëtar	Yugoslavia: Yugoslav Partisans

Commanders and leaders
Gani Merica; Local Kosovo Albanian militia	Fadil Hoxha (regional Partisan commander)

Strength
≈ 1,200–1,500 fighters	≈ 2,000–2,500 Partisans (3rd Kosovo Brigade and reinforcements)

Casualties and losses
≈ 40–60 killed	120–180 killed, several hundred wounded or captured

The Battle of Peja (Albanian: Beteja e Pejës; Serbian: Битка за Пећ / Bitka za Peć) was fought between 26 and 31 August 1944 in and around the city of Pejë in modern-day Kosovo, then part of the Italian/Albanian protectorate under German administration. Albanian nationalist forces of the Balli Kombëtar, supported by local Kosovo Albanian volunteers, clashed with the Yugoslav Partisans of the 3rd Kosovo Brigade and attached units who were attempting to seize control of the region ahead of the expected German withdrawal.

The battle ended in a clear victory for the Balli Kombëtar, which succeeded in repelling the Partisan offensive and maintaining control of Peja until the arrival of German and later Yugoslav forces in late 1944.

== Background ==
After the Italian surrender in September 1943, Kosovo and western Macedonia were incorporated into a German-protected Greater Albania. The Balli Kombëtar, which sought the unification of all Albanian-inhabited territories, established strong influence in Kosovo and cooperated tactically with German authorities against the growing Yugoslav Partisan movement. By mid-1944, as German forces began retreating from the Balkans, the Partisans intensified efforts to liberate Kosovo and re-integrate it into Yugoslavia.

In August 1944, the Partisan leadership ordered the 3rd and 5th Kosovo Brigades, under the overall command of Fadil Hoxha, to capture the key towns of Peja, Gjakova and Prizren before the arrival of the Red Army or retreating German columns.

== The battle ==
On 26 August 1944, Partisan forces launched a coordinated assault on Peja from the east and south. Balli Kombëtar units, commanded by Gani Merica and reinforced by several hundred local volunteers, had fortified positions on the hills surrounding the city and inside Peja itself.

Fighting was particularly intense around the villages of Raushiq, Loxhë and along the road to Rugova Gorge. After five days of combat, including house-to-house fighting in the outskirts, the Partisans suffered heavy casualties and were forced to withdraw toward Mitrovica and Novi Pazar. Balli Kombëtar retained control of Peja until early November 1944.

== Aftermath ==
The defeat at Peja delayed Partisan control over western Kosovo by several months and deepened the rift between Albanian nationalists and the communist-led resistance. Many Balli Kombëtar fighters from this battle later joined the anti-communist resistance against the new Yugoslav government in 1945–1946.
