= Riza Sapunxhiu =

Kosovar communist politician and economist

3rd Member of the Presidency of Yugoslavia for SAP Kosovo
- In office 15 May 1989 – 21 March 1991
- Preceded by: Sinan Hasani
- Succeeded by: Sejdo Bajramović

6th President of the Executive Council of SAP Kosovo
- In office May 1980 – May 1982
- Preceded by: Bahri Oruçi
- Succeeded by: Ymer Pula

Personal details
- Born: 15 March 1925 Peć, Kingdom of Serbs, Croats and Slovenes
- Died: 6 September 2008 (aged 83) Peja, Kosovo
- Party: League of Communists of Kosovo

Riza Sapunxhiu (15 March 1925 – 6 September 2008) was a Kosovar communist politician and economist. He served as deputy prime minister and prime minister of SAP Kosovo prior to becoming its representative in the Yugoslav Presidency.

Born in Peć, Sapunxhiu was an ethnic Albanian. From 1980 to 1982, he served as prime minister of Kosovo. In 1981, he headed the Kosovar delegation in a historical visit to Albania. This visit paved the way for closer relations between Albania and the Albanian community in Kosovo and the rest of Yugoslavia.

As a successful economist, in 1982, Sapunxhiu became an official at the World Bank.

When the Yugoslav crisis began, he supported the territorial integrity of Yugoslavia but did not effectually vote, though he was registered as voting pro. Nevertheless, the state of emergency was not declared due to opposition by other members of the presidency.

Preceded by Sinan Hasani	Kosovar member of the Yugoslav Presidency; 15 May 1989 – 20 March 1991	Succeeded by Sejdo Bajramović
Preceded by Bahri Oruçi	Prime Minister of Kosovo; 1980–1982	Succeeded by Imer Pula
