= Kolë Shiroka =

Kosovo politician, b. 1922

2nd President of the Presidency of SAP Kosovo
- In office 1982 – May 1983
- Preceded by: Ali Shukrija
- Succeeded by: Shefqet Nebih Gashi

Personal details
- Born: 1 January 1922 Prizren, Kingdom of Serbs, Croats and Slovenes
- Died: 21 May 1994 (aged 72) Belgrade, Federal Republic of Yugoslavia
- Party: League of Communists of Kosovo
- Awards: Commemorative Medal of the Partisans of 1941

Kolë Shiroka (1 January 1922 – 21 May 1994) was a political figure of Kosovo, during its period as an autonomous province of Yugoslavia. He served as President of the Presidency of the Socialist Autonomous Province of Kosovo between 1982 and 1983.
