= Bahri Oruçi =

Kosovar politician

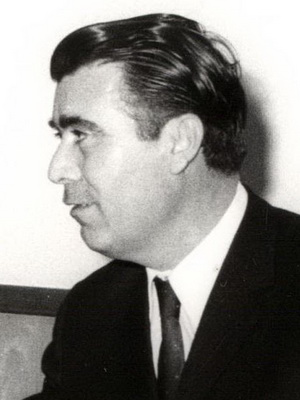

5th President of the Executive Council of SAP Kosovo
- In office May 1978 – May 1980

Personal details
- Born: 2 September 1930
- Died: 16 September 2011 (aged 81)
- Party: League of Communists of Kosovo

Bahri Oruçi (9 February 1930 – 16 November 2011) served as Chairman of the Executive Council of the Socialist Autonomous Province of Kosovo within the former Yugoslavia from May 1978 to May 1980. He was succeeded in office by Riza Sapunxhiu.
