= Đorđije Pajković =

Yugoslav Montenegrin politician

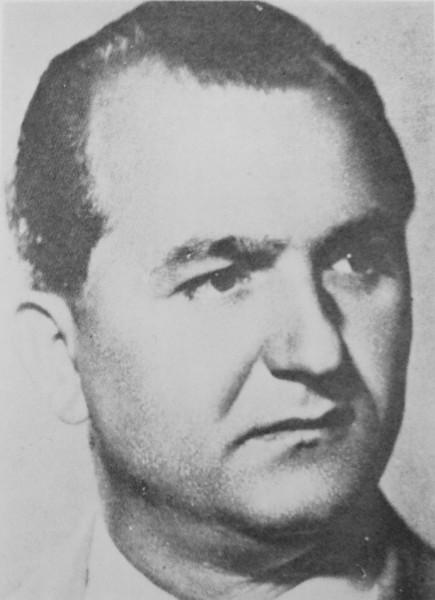
Đorđije Pajković

Đorđije "Đoko" Pajković (25 June 1917, Lužac, Berane, Kingdom of Montenegro – 17 January 1980, Belgrade, SR Serbia, Yugoslavia) was a Yugoslav Montenegrin politician.

He was the leader of the League of Communists of Montenegro from June 1963 to December 1968. He previously served as the President of the Executive Council of the SR Montenegro from 16 December 1962 to 25 June 1963.

He also served as the President of the Assembly of SAP Kosovo from 12 December 1953 to 5 May 1956 and the leader of the League of Communists of Kosovo from March 1945 to February 1956.

In 1953, he was chosen to be a National Hero of Yugoslavia.

Political offices
Preceded by Filip Bajković	President of the Executive Council of Montenegro; 16 December 1962 to 25 June 1963	Succeeded by Veselin Đuranović
Preceded by Ismet Saqiri	President of the Assembly of Kosovo; 12 December 1953 - 5 May 1956	Succeeded by Pavle Jovićević
