= Fadil Hoxha =

Kosovar politician (1916–2001)

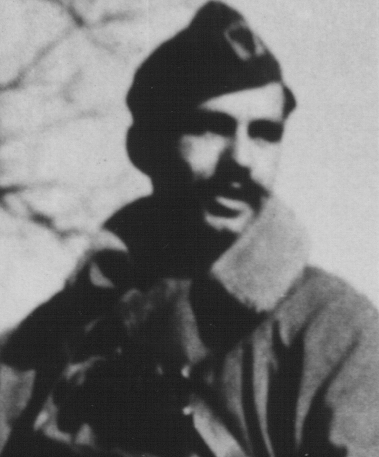

2nd, 8th President of the People's Assembly of Kosovo and Metohija
- In office 11 July 1945 – 20 February 1953
- Preceded by: Mehmed Hoxha
- Succeeded by: Ismet Shaqiri
- In office 24 June 1967 – 7 May 1969
- Preceded by: Stanoje Aksić
- Succeeded by: Ilaz Kurteshi

1st President of the Executive Council of the Autonomous Region of Kosovo and Metohija
- In office 1945–1963
- Preceded by: Position created
- Succeeded by: Ali Shukrija

Vice-President of the Presidency of Yugoslavia
- In office 1978–1979
- Preceded by: Stevan Doronjski
- Succeeded by: Lazar Koliševski

Personal details
- Born: 15 March 1916 Đakovica, Kingdom of Montenegro (now Kosovo)
- Died: 22 April 2001 (aged 85) Pristina, Kosovo under UN administration
- Party: League of Communists of Yugoslavia
- Occupation: Teacher, Partisan, statesman

Military service
- Allegiance: Socialist Federal Republic of Yugoslavia
- Branch/service: Yugoslav People's Army
- Years of service: 1941–45
- Rank: commander
- Commands: Albanian Partisans
- Battles/wars: World War II; Drenica Uprising; Battle of Peja

Fadil Hoxha (Serbo-Croatian: Фадиљ Хоџа, Fadilj Hodža; 15 March 1916 – 22 April 2001) was a Yugoslavian ethnic-Albanian communist revolutionary and politician from Kosovo. He was a member of the Communist Party and fought in the Yugoslav Partisans during World War II. After the war, he was the first President of the Executive Council of the Autonomous Region of Kosovo and Metohija (1945–1963) and later member of the Presidency of Yugoslavia (1974–1984).

== Early life ==
As a young man, Hoxha migrated from his home town of Gjakova to attend secondary school in Albania, since secondary education in the Albanian language was unavailable in Yugoslavia. He continued his education in the town of Shkodër and later in Elbasan. In Albania he joined a communist cell which provided him with his first exposure to the ideas of Marxism-Leninism. In 1939, during fascist Italy's invasion of Albania, Hoxha became active in the emerging resistance movement against the Italian occupation.

Hoxha worked as a teacher before returning to Kosovo in 1941, where he joined the partisan movement. Within a short time Hoxha rose through the partisan ranks to become commander, leading battalions. In 1943, he was appointed Yugoslav Partisan staff commander for Kosovo, the year which the Italian occupation ended and the German occupation began.

Hoxha was instrumental in the Kosovo communist movement's efforts at adopting a resolution at the Bujan Conference of 1943, which expressed the wish of Kosovo for national self-determination and unification with Albania. However, under Serbian pressure, the Communist Party of Yugoslavia annulled the resolution at the end of the war, which resulted in Kosovo's reinstitution into Serbia with a limited degree of autonomy.

== Politics ==
Hoxha's political influence in the Communist Party of Yugoslavia grew during the 1960s, especially after the removal from the upper echelons of the party of Serb hardliner Aleksandar Ranković by Josip Broz Tito. Hoxha led efforts to advance Kosovo's constitutional status in a series of constitutional reforms that took place in Yugoslavia. The efforts were consecrated by the Yugoslav constitution of 1974, which granted Kosovo extensive autonomy and comparable status to the six Yugoslav republics.

Hoxha also fought for the expansion of federal aid and development programs in Kosovo, which led to Kosovo's rapid industrialization throughout the 1960s and 1970s. Hoxha also led or otherwise supported political battles for the expansion of cultural and educational institutions in the Albanian language, leading to the virtual eradication of illiteracy among the Albanian population. In 1970, the Albanian-language University of Pristina was established along with a Kosovo Academy of Arts and Sciences in 1978.

During his political career in socialist Yugoslavia, Hoxha subscribed to the principles of Yugoslav policy of "brotherhood and unity", believing in the need to achieve national equality between Albanians, Serbs, and other national groups within Kosovo and Yugoslavia. In practice, given the grave cultural and economic backwardness which previous regimes had left Albanians in Kosovo, Hoxha believed that overcoming the disadvantages faced by Albanians required special affirmative measures both within Kosovo and at the federal level. Kosovo had inherited the highest illiteracy rates in all of Yugoslavia and was also its poorest region. Hoxha consistently initiated or supported policies which would address these problems, including expanding the educational opportunities of Albanians, expanding Yugoslav programs supporting industrial development in Kosovo, and policies addressing the relative inequality of Albanians in employment, who had disproportionately high unemployment rates.

Hoxha held a number of high posts in Kosovo and Yugoslavia. He served as president of the Assembly of the Kosovo Autonomous Province from 1945 to February 1953, and again from June 1967 to May 1969, and chairman of the executive council from 1953 to 1963. He also received the title of People's Hero of Yugoslavia. In 1967 he was appointed to the Yugoslav Communist Party Presidium and in 1974 became a member of the Federal Presidency. In 1978-79 he held the rotating post of Vice President of the Federal Presidency, the highest leadership post in Yugoslavia under Tito.

In 1981, Hoxha opposed massive demonstrations by Albanians which demanded republican status for Kosovo. Hoxha's position reflected the stance of the established Kosovo communist leadership, which defended Kosovo's existing constitutional position within Yugoslavia. His opposition to the demonstrations consequently put him at odds with Albanian nationalist and radical groups.

At a 1986 luncheon in Prizren for reserve military officers, Hoxha jokingly remarked that Serb and non-Albanian women should work as prostitutes in Kosovo's taverns in order to solve the alleged issue of rapes of Serb women by Albanian men. The statement was reported ten months later and resulted in street protests on the part of Serbian women. As a result, in October 1987, the League of Communists of Yugoslavia expelled Hoxha from the party, while also accusing him of having failed to combat Albanian nationalism in Kosovo during his reign.

Afterwards, Hoxha had withdrawn from public life and was notorious for refusing to grant interviews to the press. However, he continued to throw his support behind popular movements in Kosovo. Though in old age, Hoxha survived the 1999 Kosovo War and remained in hiding in Kosovo. He died on 22 April 2001. He was buried with high honours in his home town of Gjakova.

Hoxha has published his wartime diary Kur pranvera vonohet [When Spring is Late] (Prishtina: Rilindja, 1980) and a three-volume collection of speeches and articles in Jemi në shtëpinë tonë [This is our Home] (Prishtina: Rilindja, 1986), both published in Serbian (Kad proleće kasni : iz partizanske beležnice) and Turkish editions in addition to the original Albanian. In 2010, an autobiography on Fadil Hoxha was published under the title "Fadil Hoxha në vetën e parë" [Fadil Hoxha, in the first person] (Prishtina: Koha, 2010) by Veton Surroi. In 2011, his former associate Ekrem Murtezai published a book called "Fadil Hoxha, siç e njoha une" [Fadil Hoxha, as I knew him]. In 2007, the Association of Veterans of the Anti-Fascist National Liberation War published a collected volume, "Fadil Hoxha - një jetë në shërbim të atdheut" ("Fadil Hoxha - a life in service to the homeland"), containing documents and memoirs on Hoxha's role during and after World War II.

== Succession ==
Government offices
Preceded by Mehmed Hoxha	President of the Assembly of Kosovo and Metohija; 11 July 1945 – 20 February 1953	Succeeded by Ismet Saqiri
Preceded by position created	Chairmen of the Executive Council of Kosovo and Metohija; 1945–1963	Succeeded by Ali Shukrija
Preceded by Stanoje Akšić	President of the Assembly of Kosovo and Metohija; 24 June 1967 – 7 May 1969	Succeeded by Ilaz Kurteshi
Preceded by Stevan Doronjski	Vice-President of the Presidency of Yugoslavia; 1978–1979	Succeeded by Lazar Koliševski
