= Ilija Vakić =

Yugoslav politician

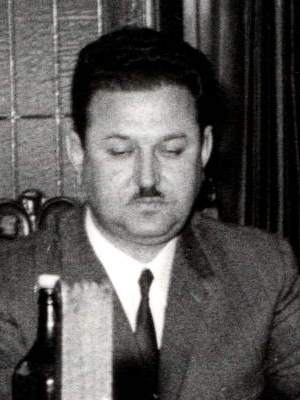
Ilija Vakić in 1968

Ilija Vakić (Serbian Cyrillic: Илија Вакић; 30 July 1932 – 21 November 2023) was a Yugoslav politician who served as Chairman of the Executive Council of the Autonomous Province of Kosovo and Metohija within the Socialist Federal Republic of Yugoslavia from May 1967 to May 1974 and was succeeded in office by Bogoljub Nedeljković. He was a member of the League of Communists of Yugoslavia (LCY), and represented the League of Communists of Kosovo in the Central Committee of the 12th Congress from 1982 until the convocation of the 13th Congress in 1986. Later on, from 1986 to 1988, Vakić served in the Federal Executive Council, the government, as President of the Federal Committee for Veterans' and Disabled Veterans' Affairs.

He died on 21 November 2023 at the age of 91.

== Bibliography ==
- McFarlane, Bruce J. (1988). Yugoslavia: Politics, Economics, and Society. Pinter Publishers. ISBN 9780861874521.
- Staff writer (1983). Directory of Officials of the Socialist Federal Republic of Yugoslavia. University of Michigan.
- Stroynowski, Juliusz, ed. (1989). Who's Who in the Socialist Countries of Europe: P–Z. K. G. Saur Verlag. ISBN 3-598-10719-6.
