= Socialist Autonomous Province of Kosovo =

Province of Serbia in Yugoslavia (1945–1990)

Socialist Autonomous Province of Kosovo Социјалистичка аутономна покрајина Косово (Serbo-Croatian) (Note: Socijalistička autonomna pokrajina Kosovo) Krahina Socialiste Autonome e Kosovës (Albanian) Kosova Sosyalist Özerk Bölgesi (Turkish)
- Autonomous province of Socialist Republic of Serbia in Yugoslavia
- 1945–1990
- Kosovo (dark red) in the Socialist Republic of Serbia (light red), within the Socialist Federal Republic of Yugoslavia
- Capital: Pristina
- Area
  - 1991: 10,887 km^{2} (4,203 sq mi)
- Population
  - 1991: 1,584,441
- Government
  - Type: Unitary communist state
- Leader of the LCK
  - 1945–1956: Đorđije Pajković (first)
  - 1989–1990: Rahman Morina (last)
- Head of state
  - 1945–1956: Fadil Hoxha (first)
  - 1989–1991: Hysen Kajdomçaj (last)
- Historical era: Cold War
  - Autonomous Region: 3 September 1945
  - Autonomous Province: 1963
  - Constitutional reform: 28 September 1990
Preceded by	Succeeded by
Democratic Federal Yugoslavia	Republic of Kosova; Kosovo and Metohija

The Socialist Autonomous Province of Kosovo, (Note: Serbo-Croatian: Социјалистичка аутономна покрајина Косово / Socijalistička autonomna pokrajina Kosovo, Albanian: Krahina Socialiste Autonome e Kosovës, Turkish: Kosova Sosyalist Özerk Bölgesi) referred to simply as Kosovo, SAP Kosovo or SAPK, was one of the two autonomous provinces of the Socialist Republic of Serbia within Yugoslavia (the other being Vojvodina), between 1945 and 1990, when it was renamed Autonomous Province of Kosovo and Metohija.

Between 1945 and 1963 it was officially named the Autonomous Region of Kosovo and Metohija, with a level of self-government lower than that of the Autonomous Province of Vojvodina. In 1963 it was granted the same level of autonomy as Vojvodina, and accordingly its official name was changed to Autonomous Province of Kosovo and Metohija. In 1968 the term "Metohija" was dropped, and the prefix "Socialist" was added, changing the official name of the province to Socialist Autonomous Province of Kosovo. In 1974 both autonomous provinces (Vojvodina and Kosovo) were granted significantly increased levels of autonomy. In 1989, under the presidency of Slobodan Milošević, that level of autonomy was reduced. In 1990 the term "Metohija" was reinserted into the provincial name, with "Socialist" being dropped. From that point on the official name of the province was once again Autonomous Province of Kosovo and Metohija, as it had been between 1963 and 1968.

== Background ==
Until 1912, the region of Kosovo was under Ottoman rule. After the First Balkan War it was incorporated into the Kingdom of Serbia by the Treaty of London. At the time that Serbia annexed Kosovo (1912–1913), the 1903 constitution was still in force. This constitution required a Grand National Assembly before Serbia's borders could be expanded to include Kosovo; but no such Grand National Assembly was ever held. Constitutionally, Kosovo should not have become part of the Kingdom of Serbia. It was initially ruled by decree. Serbian political parties, and the army, could not agree on how to govern the newly conquered territories; eventually this was solved by a royal decree.

In 1918, the region of Kosovo, with the rest of Serbia, became part of newly formed Kingdom of Serbs, Croats and Slovenes (since 1929 renamed as Kingdom of Yugoslavia). During the interwar period (1918-1941), the constitutional status of the region Kosovo within Yugoslavia was unresolved. In 1941, the Kingdom of Yugoslavia was attacked and occupied by Nazi Germany and its allies. The region of Kosovo was occupied by Germans (northern part), Italians (central part) and Bulgarians (eastern part). Italian occupation zone was formally annexed to Fascist Albania. That marked the beginning of mass persecution of ethnic Serbs in the annexed regions of Metohija and central Kosovo. A reign of terror was enforced by Albanian nationalist organization Balli Kombëtar and by Skanderbeg SS Division, created by Heinrich Himmler. By the end of 1944, the Serbian population of the region was decimated.

In 1944, Tito had written that it "will obtain a broader autonomy, and the question of which federal unit they are joined to will depend on the people themselves, through their representatives" although in practice decision making was centralised and undemocratic. There were various proposals to join Kosovo to other areas (even to Albania) but in 1945 it was decided to join Kosovo to the Socialist Republic of Serbia. However, one piece of the former Kosovo Vilayet was given to the new Yugoslav republic of Macedonia (including the former capital Skopje), whilst another part had passed to Montenegro (mainly Pljevlja, Bijelo Polje and Rožaje), also a new entity. In July 1945, a "Resolution for the annexation of Kosovo–Metohija to federal Serbia" was passed by Kosovo's "Regional People's Council".

== 1945–1963 ==
From 1945 to 1963, it was the Autonomous Region of Kosovo and Metohija (Serbo-Croatian: Аутономна Косовско-метохијска област / Autonomna Kosovsko-metohijska oblast), which was a lower level of autonomy than Vojvodina.

The Autonomous Region of Kosovo and Metohija was created on 3 September 1945. After the break with the Cominform in 1948, Yugoslavia tightened certain policies, including stricter collectivisation. This led to serious reductions in grain production in Kosovo; there were food shortages across Yugoslavia. In parallel with this, the Albanian government began to criticise Yugoslav rule over Kosovo; the Yugoslav government responded with crackdowns on the local population, in search of "traitors" and "fifth columnists", although the earliest underground pro-Tirana group was not founded until the early 1960s.

In the mid–1950s, the Assembly of PR Serbia decided that the Leposavić municipality (187 km^{2}) be ceded to the Autonomous Region of Kosovo and Metohija, after requests by the Kosovo leadership. It had up until then been part of the Kraljevo srez, of which the population was wholly Serb. After this, the number of Serbs drastically fell (but remaining the plurality). In 1959, Leposavić was incorporated into the province.

After the Tito-Stalin rift in 1948, the relations between Stalinist Albania and Yugoslavia were also broken. Language policy was of utmost importance in communist Yugoslavia, which after World War II was reorganised as a federation of ethnolinguistically defined nations. In postwar Kosovo, the local Albanian language was distanced from Albania's standard steeped in Tosk, by basing it on the Kosovar dialect of Gheg. As a result, a standard Kosovar language was formed. However, after the rapprochement between Albania and Yugoslavia at the turn of the 1970s, Belgrade adopted Albania's Tosk-based standard of the Albanian language, which ended the brief flourishing of the Gheg-based Kosovar language.

== 1963–1968 ==
The Autonomous Province of Kosovo and Metohija (Serbo-Croatian: Аутономна покрајина Косово и Метохија / Autonomna pokrajina Kosovo i Metohija, Albanian: Krahina Autonome e Kosovës dhe Metohisë) was the name used from 1963 to 1968, when the term "Metohija" was dropped, and the prefix "Socialist" was added.

Kosovo officially became an autonomous province in 1963, after the constitutional reforms, and its position was equalized with the status of Vojvodina. Tensions between ethnic Albanians and the Yugoslav and Serbian governments were significant, not only due to national tensions but also due to political ideological concerns, especially regarding relations with neighbouring Albania. Harsh repressive measures were imposed on Kosovo Albanians due to suspicions that they there were sympathisers of the Stalinist policies of Albania's Enver Hoxha. In 1956, a show trial in Priština was held in which multiple Albanian Communists of Kosovo were convicted of being infiltrators from Albania and were given long prison sentences. High-ranking Serbian communist official Aleksandar Ranković sought to secure the position of the Serbs in Kosovo and gave them dominance in Kosovo's nomenklatura.

Islam in Kosovo at this time was repressed and both Albanians and Muslim Slavs were encouraged to declare themselves to be Turkish and emigrate to Turkey. At the same time Serbs and Montenegrins dominated the government, security forces, and industrial employment in Kosovo. Albanians resented these conditions and protested against them in the late 1960s, accusing the actions taken by authorities in Kosovo as being colonialist, as well as demanding that Kosovo be made a republic, or declaring support for Albania.

== 1968–1990 ==
The Socialist Autonomous Province of Kosovo (Serbo-Croatian: Социјалистичка аутономна покрајина Косово / Socijalistička autonomna pokrajina Kosovo, Albanian: Krahina Socialiste Autonome e Kosovës) was the name used from 1968, when the prefix "Socialist" was added, and the term "Metohija" was dropped. The name Socialist Autonomous Province of Kosovo was officially used until 1990, when the term "Metohija" was reinserted into the official name, and the prefix "Socialist" was dropped.

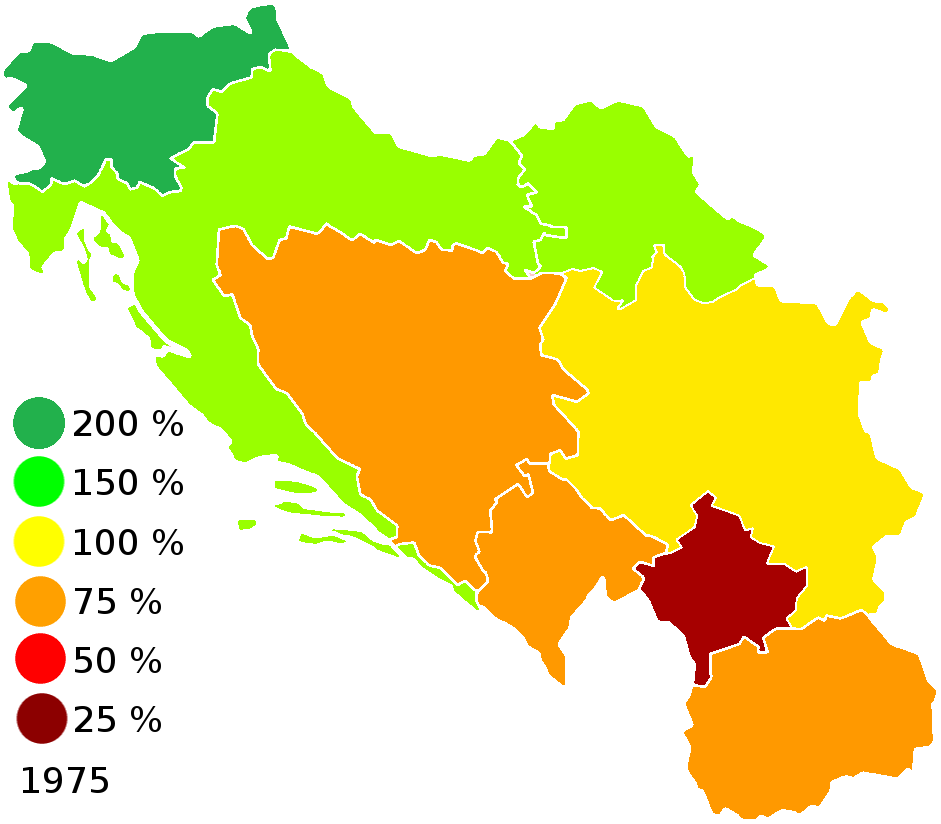
Average strength of Yugoslav economy as a deviation from the main (Yugoslavia = 100 %) indicator in 1975. SAP Kosovo was the poorest entity of SFR Yugoslavia.

=== Building substantial autonomy: 1968–1974 ===
Autonomy of Kosovo was significantly strengthened in 1968, as a result of major political changes in Yugoslavia. After the earlier ouster of Ranković in 1966, the agenda of pro-decentralisation reformers in Yugoslavia, especially from Slovenia and Croatia, succeeded in 1968 in attaining significant constitutional decentralisation of powers, creating substantial autonomy in both Kosovo and Vojvodina, and recognising a Muslim Yugoslav nationality. As a result of these reforms, there was a massive overhaul of Kosovo's nomenklatura and police, that shifted from being Serb-dominated to ethnic Albanian-dominated through firing Serbs in large scale. Further concessions were made to the ethnic Albanians of Kosovo in response to unrest, including the creation of the University of Pristina as an Albanian language institution. These changes created widespread fear amongst Serbs that they were being made second-class citizens in Yugoslavia by these changes.

=== Substantial autonomy achieved: 1974–1990 ===
The Socialist Autonomous Province of Kosovo received more autonomy within Serbia and Yugoslavia by constitutional reform in 1974. In the new constitutions of Yugoslavia and Serbia, adopted during the reform of 1974, Kosovo was granted major autonomy, allowing it to have not only its own administration and assembly, but also a substantial constitutional, legislative and judicial autonomy.

Per the Constitutions of SFR Yugoslavia and SR Serbia, SAP Kosovo also gained its own Constitution, allowing it to regulate its social, economic and political affairs, headed by the assembly. The Province of Kosovo gained the highest officials, most notably Presidency and Government, and gained a seat in the national Presidency of Yugoslavia (including veto power on the federal level) which equated it to the Socialist Republic of Serbia.

The local Albanian-dominated ruling class had been asking for recognition of Kosovo as a parallel republic to Serbia within the Federation, and after Josip Broz Tito’s death in 1980, the demands were renewed. In March 1981, Albanian students started the 1981 protests in Kosovo, where a social protest turned into violent mass riots with nationalist demands across the province, which the Yugoslav authorities contained with force. Emigration of non-Albanians increased and ethnic tensions between Albanians and non-Albanians greatly increased, with violent inner-attacks, especially aimed at the Yugoslavian officials and representatives of authority.

The 1985 Đorđe Martinović incident and the 1987 Paraćin massacre contributed to the atmosphere of ethnic tensions.

In 1988 and 1989, Serbian authorities engaged in a series of moves known as the anti-bureaucratic revolution, which resulted in the sacking of province leadership in November 1988 and a significant reduction of autonomy of Kosovo in March 1989.

On 28 June 1989, Milošević led a mass celebration of the 600th anniversary of a 1389 Battle of Kosovo. Milošević's Gazimestan speech, which marked the beginning of his political prominence, was an important part of the events that contributed to the ongoing crisis in Kosovo. The ensuing Serbian nationalist movement was also a contributing factor to the Yugoslav Wars.

The status of Kosovo was returned to the pre-1968 Autonomous Province of Kosovo and Metohija by the new Constitution of the Republic of Serbia, adopted on 28 September 1990.

The Kosovo War followed with Kosovo coming under United Nations administration in 1999. Later, in February 2008, Kosovo declared its independence from Serbia, while Serbia continues to claim it as the Autonomous Province of Kosovo and Metohija.

== Demographics ==
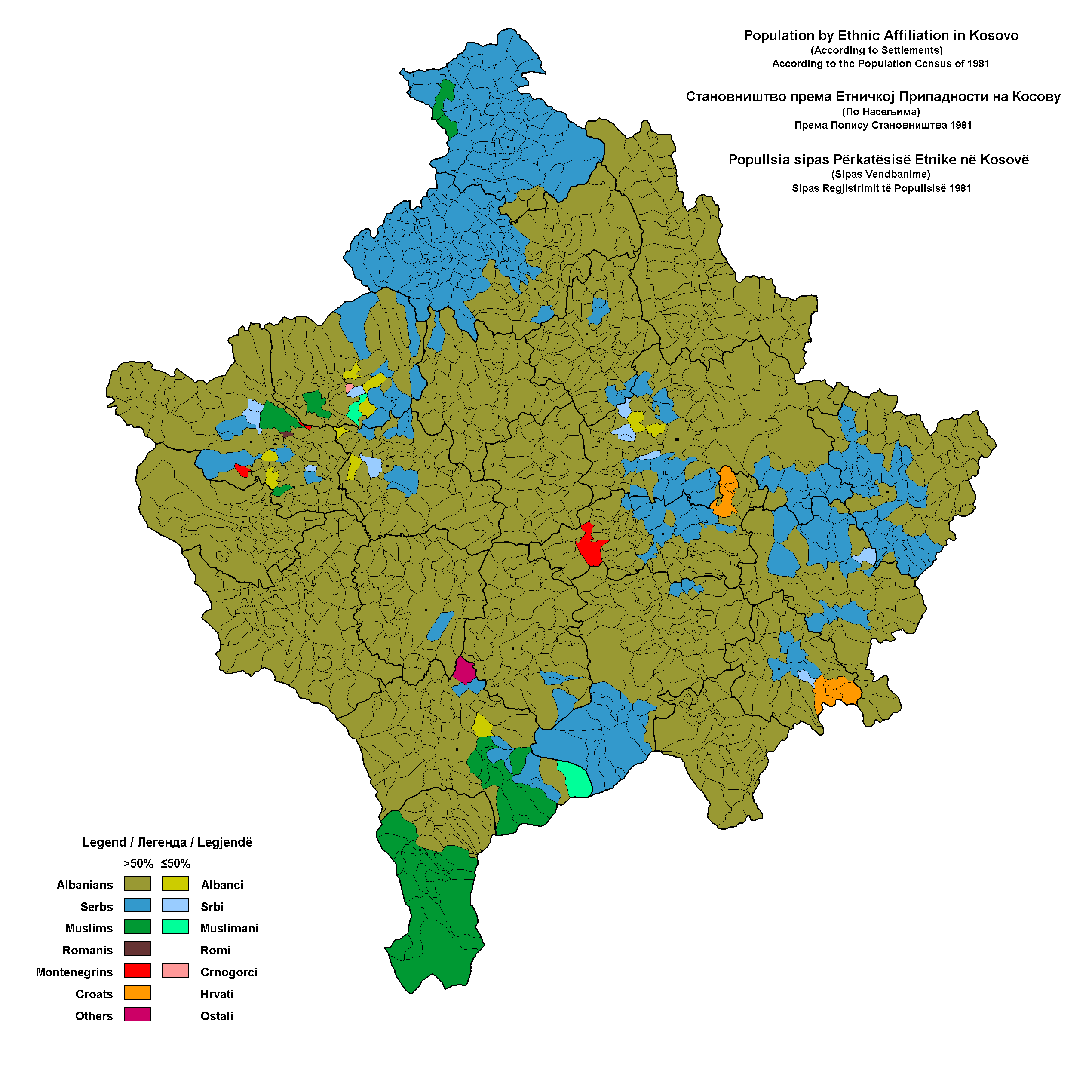
Ethnic structure of Kosovo by settlements, according to the 1981 census

According to the 1981 census, the last one taken during the period between 1974 and 1990, the population of the province numbered 1,584,441 people, including:

- 1,226,736 Albanians (77.4%)
- 236,526 Serbs (14.93%)
- 58,562 ethnic Muslims (3.7%)
- 34,126 Roma (2.2%)
- 12,513 Turks (0.8%)
- 8,717 Croats (0.6%)
- 2,676 Yugoslavs (0.2%)
- 4,584 others (0.2%)

== Politics ==
The only political party in the province was League of Communists of Kosovo, which was part of the League of Communists of Serbia and part of the League of Communists of Yugoslavia.

== Flag ==
Like Vojvodina, Kosovo used the flag of SR Serbia for official use. Despite not having an official flag of its own, the Socialist Autonomous Province of Kosovo used several flags associated with its constituent ethnic groups. Kosovo Albanians used the flag of Albania. Sources also record the use of a Turkish minority flag without the white star among the Turkish community in Kosovo and other parts of Yugoslavia. The Yugoslav federal government allowed flags for its republics only.

Flag	Use	Description
	Flag of Kosovo Albanians	
	Flag of Kosovo Serbs and Montenegrins	
	Flag of Kosovo Turks	

== Political leaders ==
=== Presidents ===
Chairman of the People's Liberation Committee of the Socialist Autonomous Province of Kosovo:

- Mehmed Hoxha, 1 January 1944 – 11 July 1945

Presidents of the Assembly of the Socialist Autonomous Province of Kosovo:

- Fadil Hoxha, 11 July 1945 – 20 February 1953; 24 June 1967 – 7 May 1969
- Ismet Saqiri, 20 February 1953 – 12 December 1953
- Đorđije Pajković, 12 December 1953 – 5 May 1956
- Pavle Jovićević, 5 May 1956 – 4 April 1960
- Dusan Mugoša, 4 April 1960 – 18 June 1963
- Stanoje Akšić, 18 June 1963 – 24 June 1967
- Ilaz Kurteshi, 7 May 1969 – May 1974

Presidents of Presidency of the Socialist Autonomous Province of Kosovo:

- Xhavid Nimani, March 1974 – 1981
- Ali Šukrija, August 1981 – 1982
- Kolë Shiroka, 1982 – May 1983
- Shefqet Nebih Gashi, May 1983 – May 1985
- Branislav Skembarević, May 1985 – May 1986
- Bajram Selani, May 1986 – May 1988
- Remzi Kolgeci, May 1988 – 5 April 1989
- Hysen Kajdomçaj, 27 June 1989 – 11 April 1990

=== Prime Ministers ===
Chairman of the Executive Council of the People's Committee of the Socialist Autonomous Province of Kosovo:

- Fadil Hoxha, 1945–1953

Chairmen of the Executive Council of the Socialist Autonomous Province of Kosovo:

- Fadil Hoxha, 1953–1963
- Ali Šukrija, 1963 – May 1967
- Ilija Vakić, May 1967 – May 1974
- Bogoljub Nedeljković, May 1974 – May 1978
- Bahri Oruçi, May 1978 – May 1980
- Riza Sapunxhiu, May 1980 – May 1982
- Imer Pula, May 1982 – 5 May 1984
- Ljubomir Neđo Borković, 5 May 1984 – May 1986
- Namzi Mustafa, May 1986 – 1987
- Kaqusha Jashari, 1987 – May 1989
- Nikolla Shkreli, May 1989 – 1989
- Daut Jashanica, 1989
- Jusuf Zejnullahu, 4 December 1989 – 5 July 1990

== See also ==
- Political status of Kosovo
- Socialist Republic of Serbia
- Socialist Autonomous Province of Vojvodina
- Autonomous Province of Kosovo and Metohija

== Sources ==
- Bennett, Christopher (1995). Yugoslavia's Bloody Collapse: Causes, Course and Consequences. London: Hurst & Company. ISBN 9781850652281.
- Ćirković, Sima (2004). The Serbs. Malden: Blackwell Publishing. ISBN 9781405142915.
- Krieger, Heike (2001). The Kosovo Conflict and International Law: An Analytical Documentation 1974–1999. Cambridge: Cambridge University Press. ISBN 9780521800716.
- Malcolm, Noel (1998). Kosovo: A Short History. London: Macmillan. ISBN 9780333666128.
- Pavlowitch, Stevan K. (2002). Serbia: The History behind the Name. London: Hurst & Company. ISBN 9781850654773.
- Ramet, Sabrina P.; Pavlaković, Vjeran, eds. (2007) [2005]. Serbia Since 1989: Politics and Society Under Milošević and After. Seattle: University of Washington Press. ISBN 978-0295985381.
- Tomasevich, Jozo (2001). War and Revolution in Yugoslavia, 1941–1945: Occupation and Collaboration. Vol. 2. San Francisco: Stanford University Press. ISBN 9780804779241.
