= 8th session of the Central Committee of the League of Communists of Serbia =

Political event in Serbia

- Slobodan Milošević (back) and Ivan Stambolić (front) at the 8th session
- Native name: Осма седница Централног комитета Савеза комуниста Србије; Osma sednica Centralnog komiteta Saveza komunista Srbije
- Date: 23–24 September 1987
- Location: Belgrade, SR Serbia, SFR Yugoslavia
- Type: Political session
- Organised by: League of Communists of Serbia

The Central Committee of the 10th Congress of the League of Communists of Serbia (SKS) held its 8th session in Belgrade on 23–24 September 1987. This session proved to be a turning point in the history of Serbia and Yugoslavia, as it marked the rise of Slobodan Milošević as the key force in Serbian politics.

Following the death of Josip Broz Tito in 1980, Yugoslavia experienced an economic crisis and ethnic riots in the Socialist Autonomous Province of Kosovo. During the late 1970s and early 1980s, Ivan Stambolić and his protégé Milošević rose through the ranks of the SKS. Stambolić, a political reformist, became the president of the SKS Presidency in 1984, while Milošević became the president of the League of Communists of Belgrade City Committee. Milošević succeeded Stambolić as the president of the SKS Presidency in 1986, and Dragiša Pavlović, another protégé of Stambolić, was chosen as Milošević's replacement in Belgrade.

Amidst the tensions in Kosovo Polje, Milošević was sent to the town in April 1987 where he embraced populism and became increasingly critical of Stambolić's and Pavlović's moderate views on Kosovo. After Pavlović's press conference on the Paraćin massacre on 11 September, a closed session of the presidency of the Central Committee of SKS was held from 18 to 20 September, at which Pavlović's comments were discussed and a letter supportive of Pavlović written by Milošević's ally Dušan Mitević was presented to the attendees as allegedly written by Stambolić.

Later, on 23–24 September, the Central Committee of SKS convened for its 8th session and voted to dismiss Pavlović from the presidency of the Central Committee and his and Stambolić's allies from the City Committee of the League of Communists of Belgrade. Stambolić was later dismissed as president of Serbia in December 1987, which signalled Milošević's successful consolidation of power within the SKS and Serbia. The removal of Pavlović, Stambolić, and others was done in accordance with formal procedures. Despite this, some scholars and journalists, such as Dejan Jović, Jasna Dragović-Soso, Slaviša Lekić, and Zoran Pavić refer to Pavlović's removal as an internal coup d'état or a purge. Stambolić later tried to make a political comeback in the September 2000 general election but was eventually assassinated on the orders of Milošević, a month before the election.

== Background ==
=== Post-World War II ===
After World War II, the Communist Party, under Josip Broz Tito's leadership, seized power and established a socialist state in Yugoslavia. Each constituent republic had its own branch of the Communist Party, with Serbia having the Communist Party of Serbia. The federal Communist Party was renamed the League of Communists of Yugoslavia (SKJ) at its 6th Congress in 1952. Its branches did the same; the Communist Party of Serbia became the League of Communists of Serbia (SKS).

Upon the death of Tito, Yugoslavia experienced an economic crisis, constitutional problems, and a rise in ethnic nationalism. To reduce its debt, Yugoslavia implemented austerity measures. Despite government efforts, the debt, inflation, and unemployment all increased during the 1980s. Additionally, the Socialist Autonomous Province of Kosovo experienced ethnic riots in 1981, which were clamped down on by authorities. Kosovo Albanian demonstrators demanded the formation of the Republic of Kosovo, which would have the same constitutional rights as the other constituent republics of Yugoslavia. The SKS leadership responded to the protests by purging the League of Communists of Kosovo and University of Pristina. These riots have been interpreted by the political scientist Dejan Jović as "the beginning of the deep state crisis in Yugoslavia, one that would lead to its dissolution". The publicist and political analyst Zlatoje Martinov somewhat concurs, claiming that the constituent republicans throughout the 1980s evolved into "de facto states with their own armed forces".

=== The Stambolić–Milošević relationship ===
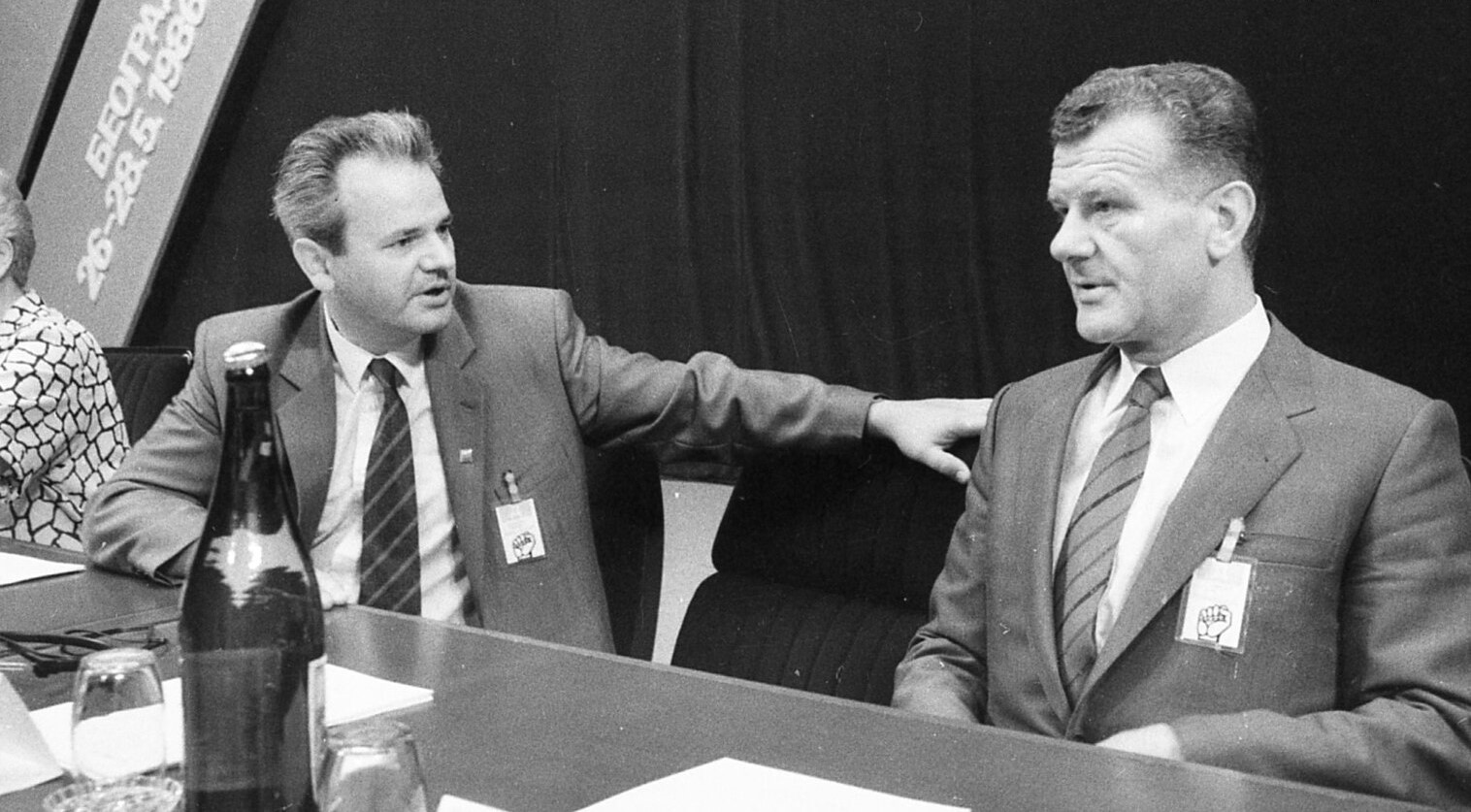
Slobodan Milošević (left) was the protégé of Ivan Stambolić (right). This image was taken during the 10th SKS Congress in May 1986, at which Milošević succeeded Stambolić as the president of the SKS Presidency.

In the 1960s, the Faculty of Law of the University of Belgrade was known for enrolling students who would go on to become high-ranking politicians in Serbia. Slobodan Milošević enrolled there in 1960 and met Ivan Stambolić with whom he soon formed a close bond. After finishing studies, Milošević became Stambolić's protégé. For instance, when Stambolić became the director of Tehnogas, an industrial gas company, in 1965, he appointed Milošević as the assistant director at Tehnogas. When Stambolić left Tehnogas, Milošević became its director. Later in 1978, when Stambolić became the prime minister of Serbia, he appointed Milošević as director of Beobank, one of the leading banks of Yugoslavia at the time.

Stambolić was seen as a political reformist and anti-nationalist. Upon the expiration of his mandate as prime minister in 1982, he was appointed president of the League of Communists of Belgrade City Committee. Later that same year, Milošević entered politics after being appointed head of the Stari Grad SKS committee; he left his position as the director of Beobank in December 1983. Stambolić was elected president of the SKS Presidency in April 1984, becoming the leader of the SKS. Milošević was appointed as his successor to his previous position.

Milošević was considered a technocrat, but inside the City Committee, he began initiating campaigns against reformists and dissidents. Miloš Vasić, a journalist and co-creator of the Vreme magazine, described Milošević's actions as Stalinist, saying that he "talked about 'people's democracy', 'great steps forward in the service of socialism', no other Communist leaders used this jargon". By 1985, Milošević gained full control over the League of Communists of Belgrade, appointing officials who were loyal to him; he also garnered support from various professors from the University of Belgrade that were close to Milošević's wife, Mirjana Marković.

=== Election of Slobodan Milošević ===
Since the president of the SKS Presidency was limited to a two-year term in office, leading party officials began jockeying for Stambolić's successor in January 1985 at informal sessions. Amongst the candidates were Milošević and Radiša Gačić. Stambolić championed Milošević as his successor and gained support from leading officials, such as his uncle Petar Stambolić, a member of the Central Committee of the 12th SKJ Congress (12th SKJ CC) and the state presidency, Nikola Ljubičić, a state presidency and 12th SKJ CC member, Dobrivoj Vidić, a state presidency and Presidency of the 12th SKJ Congress member, and Dušan Čkrebić, the outgoing president of the SKS Presidency. The media, including Politika, Politika Ekspres, and the Radio Television of Belgrade (RTB), also intensively began reporting on Milošević and his candidature.

However, Milošević's candidature was not supported by the reformists, such as candidate Dragoslav Marković, the president of the Presidency of the SKJ Central Committee from 1983 to 1984, who claimed that Milošević would not bring unity within SKS. At a 25 January 1986 session, eight candidates were nominated for the position, including Milošević and Gačić. Besides himself, Marković also nominated Špiro Galović as one of the competing candidates. Despite support in some corners for his election, Gačić opted to support Milošević after being pressured by Stambolić. In early 1986, Stambolić tried to win over as many as possible for Milošević's candidacy; he told Azem Vllasi, the future president of the presidency of the Provincial Committee of the League of Communists of Kosovo, that it would be easier to work with Milošević than with Marković. In Vojvodina, however, Milošević had a negative reputation amongst the political establishment due to his comments at a party session in November 1984. The outcome of the vote was predetermined, considering that Stambolić had already discussed with members of the presidency of SKS. The presidency of SKS eventually voted 12 for and 8 against to nominate Milošević as the sole candidate for the president of SKS. Despite Milošević obtaining a majority, Stambolić's decision to not vote on other candidates besides Milošević received criticism from individuals present at the session. The election's conduct was also criticised by most local party chapters, including the Belgrade and Novi Sad City Committees.

In the aftermath of the session, a purge inside SKS occurred to allow Milošević to be elected president of the SKS Presidency. Milošević was elected at the closure of the 10th SKS Congress, held on 26–28 May 1986, as the president of the SKS Presidency, with 151 out of 157 votes in favour, while Stambolić was elected president of Serbia by the presidency of SKS. Previously at an electoral session in April 1986, Dragiša Pavlović, a reformist and Stambolić's ally, was elected president of the League of Communists of Belgrade City Committee, as Milošević's successor. Milošević had supported his loyalist Aleksandar Bakočević to this position, though Stambolić and the Presidency did not. Following Milošević's election, Galović told Stambolić: "In the next sixth months, [Milošević] will stab you in the back!". The 10th Congress was the second to last Congress of SKS.

== Preceding events ==
=== Kosovo Polje gathering ===
Stambolić, while still the president of the SKS Presidency, initiated discussions to solve Kosovo issue in 1985. The Serbian Academy of Sciences and Arts selected a committee of academics to draft a document that could address the issue. The draft document, titled The Memorandum, was leaked by the newspaper Večernje novosti in 1986. The document made numerous allegations regarding the 1974 Yugoslav Constitution, including that the Constitution discriminated against Serbs and that there was an ongoing "physical, political, legal, and cultural genocide" of the Serb population in Kosovo. Both Stambolić and Milošević condemned the memorandum.

Amidst the tensions in Kosovo, Stambolić sent Milošević to Kosovo Polje on 20 April 1987. There, Milošević gave a speech, which, according to the writer Adam LeBor was in "the standard party line of 'Brotherhood and unity'". After returning to Belgrade, Milošević consulted with officials about the situation in Kosovo Polje. Together with Vllasi, Milošević returned to Kosovo Polje on 24 April. Milošević then took a populist turn. Milošević gave a speech, and then, while walking through the crowd of Kosovo Serb demonstrators, repeated "no one will dare to beat you!" (niko ne sme da vas bije!) twice to the demonstrators. The political scientist Lenard J. Cohen characterised the event as the "serpent in the bosom". Following the gathering, Milošević's popularity among Kosovo Serbs ascended.

According to Stambolić, Milošević returned to Belgrade "as a new man". Stambolić was also appalled by how Milošević sided with only one ethnic group. Stambolić had tried to reconcile the nationalists and Titoists but failed. "Stambolić could not make the political leap of faith", Vasić said. After the gathering in Kosovo Polje, Milošević's criticism towards Stambolić and Pavlović intensified, mainly driven by their moderate positions on Kosovo. Stambolić and Pavlović favoured a more conciliatory approach than Milošević did. At a Central Committee of SKJ meeting in June 1987, Milošević proposed the "unification of the Republic of Serbia" and to strip away Kosovo's and Vojvodina's autonomous rights. Boško Krunić, a Vojvodina politician, said that "[Milošević] was very straightforward about the autonomy of Vojvodina. He opposed it". Following the meeting, Kosovo Serbs organised a protest in front of the Federal Assembly of the SFRY in Belgrade, demanding the abolition of Kosovo's autonomy.

=== Paraćin massacre ===
Aziz Kelmendi, a Kosovo Albanian recruit in the Yugoslav People's Army (JNA), shot and killed four JNA soldiers on 3 September 1987 in Paraćin. Of those killed, two were Bosniaks, one was a Serb, and the fourth was a half-Croat and half-Slovene. Kelmendi then fled from the military camp in Paraćin and committed suicide. The media, such as newspapers Politika and Borba, portrayed the killings as politically motivated. Stambolić and Milošević did not attend the Serb JNA soldier's funeral. Those who were present chanted nationalist slogans, including slogans against Vllasi. In the aftermath of the Paraćin massacre, Serbs smashed windows of local Albanian-owned business shops in Paraćin, Valjevo, and Subotica.

=== Days preceding the 8th session ===
In light of the events in Kosovo and Paraćin, Stambolić and Pavlović endeavoured to tackle the issue at hand, with Pavlović calling a press conference on 11 September. In his assessment, Pavlović highlighted the increasing prevalence of Serbian nationalism and underscored the significance of critiquing this ideology, pointing out its inability to address social issues or enhance inter-nationality events. "We must criticise Serbian nationalism today because, among other things, Serbian nationalists imagine themselves as saviours of the Serbian cause in Kosovo, without in fact being able to solve a single social problem, and especially without being able to improve inter-nationality events", Pavlović said during the press conference. In the following days, Milošević discussed the Kosovo issue with Dušan Mitević, a journalist from RTB. Milošević told Mitević that Marković had written an op-ed, titled "Dragiša Pavlović's Shallow Opinions", about the dispute between himself and Pavlović under the Politika journalist Dragoljub Milanović's name. With the op-ed's publication, the policy differences between the Stambolić–Pavlović group and Milošević came to light. Dejan Jović referred to the Stambolić–Pavlović grouping as "institutionalists" and Milošević's supporters as "revolutionists", while Stambolić, in his 1995 book The Road to Nowhere, used the terms "cool heads" and "hot heads". There were also other policy differences between them regarding the proper implementation of democratic centralism and a dispute over personnel appointments.

Milošević consulted with Borisav Jović, a member of the SKS Presidency and future president of the Assembly of SR Serbia, shortly after the 11 September conference in which Jović told him that Pavlović had to be expelled from the party; Milošević agreed with Jović's suggestion. Pavlović called another session of the City Committee of Belgrade on 17 September where he tried to clarify his political position, stating "Inflammatory words bring nothing but fire. With unmeasured words, only a hysterical mood without a solution that leads to the worst will be created". Pavlović told the attendees that Stambolić wrote him a letter in which he said that if he did not get the right to speak at the session of the Central Committee of SKS, Stambolić would speak in his favour. Despite the SKS Presidency's position, the League of Communists of Belgrade still stood behind Pavlović. Mitević, in the minority, particularly criticised the letter and Stambolić's involvement. The following day, on 18 September, a closed session of the presidency of the Central Committee of SKS was held, with Pavlović's comments at the press conference only on the agenda. When officials tried to interpret his press conference differently and present him as being opposed to the policies of the presidency of the Central Committee of SKS, Pavlović denied the accusations that were made against him. At the session, Vllasi, Stambolić, Branislav Ikonić, and Desimir Jevtić supported Pavlović. Stambolić tried to reconcile Pavlović and Milošević and suggested that "they meet for coffee every day, or maybe even lemonade".

Gačić and Đorđe Stojšić, the president of the League of Communists of Vojvodina Presidency, tried to present a compromise solution but were cut short by Ilija Davidović, an executive secretary of the Presidency of the Central Committee of SKS, who accused Stambolić of writing a letter in support of Pavlović. Milošević read the alleged letter, which was actually written by Mitević, out loud and then criticised Pavlović. Milošević succeeded in presenting the letter as a scandal to gain more votes in his favour. He then called a session of the Central Committee of SKS for 23–24 September, at which Pavlović's comments were again on the agenda. Despite calling the session, Milošević was concerned that the Veterans' Union of Belgrade (SUBNOR), which had supported Pavlović earlier, would support Pavlović again. SUBNOR ended up not taking a position on the matter due to concerted pressure by the State Security Service.

== Session ==
External videos
- Osma sednica: Rat drugova (drugi deo) The Radio Television of Serbia documentary on the 8th session which includes video material from the 8th session and interviews of political figures in 2017

The 8th session of the Central Committee of SKS was held in Belgrade and was broadcast live on television. 91 officials participated in the session, while the agenda consisted of three items, one of which was the vote to dismiss Pavlović. According to LeBor, Milošević played a high-stakes game at the session that could have backfired on him. Zoran Sokolović, the secretary of the Presidency, wrote the opening word of the session, talking about Pavlović's comments and a SKS meeting related to media. Ljubičić was the first to speak at the session; he talked about Pavlović and made threats and suggestions to Stambolić. Stambolić was the next to speak, and went on to criticise Milošević for cracking on dissidents while also calling for "party unity". Throughout the session, Milošević tried to portray himself as someone who adored Tito and Yugoslavia while accusing Pavlović of the opposite. He also talked about Pavlović's political positions regarding Kosovo, describing them as "soft".

During the session, Milošević tried to garner as many votes as possible in his favour. Vllasi declined to support him, and in response, Milošević called him a "cunt". Vllasi responded by calling Milošević "a liar and a cheat". Milošević successfully managed to gain more votes partly due to receiving the backing of the JNA army generals represented in the Central Committee of SKS. One of these generals was Ljubičić. Čkrebić also gave a speech at the session, accusing Stambolić of being a dictator. Stambolić denied Čkrebić's allegations. The session lasted more than 20 hours. Because of the session's length, Mitević managed to manipulate the television broadcast by removing or delaying critical speeches of Milošević.

On the session's last day, Milošević gave the final speech. He then called a vote to dismiss Pavlović from the presidency of the Central Committee of SKS. The Central Committee of SKS voted overwhelmingly for the proposal, with only eight officials opposed to the proposal and 18 members, mostly from Vojvodina and Kosovo, choosing to abstain from voting. Besides Pavlović, five more Stambolić's allies from the City Committee of the League of Communists of Belgrade were dismissed from their positions. After the vote, Milošević accused Pavlović of being unable to tell the difference between Serbian nationalism and the intentions of the Serbian leadership in Kosovo.

With Pavlović dismissed from SKS and Stambolić politically weakened, Milošević successfully consolidated power over SKS, and effectively Serbia itself. According to the authors Allan Little and Laura Silber, the session signalled the beginning of a "purge of everything from the Belgrade media to the head waiter at the Serbian government villa". The Washington Post reported that the tensions between the Serbs and Albanians escalated due to the session. On the other hand, the Croat newspaper Vjesnik wrote that "the public can hardly see any essential political difference between those who remained in the Serbian leadership and those had left" because of the session. The magazine Duga titled their report on the 8th session as the "36 Hours of Sleeplessness".

== Aftermath ==
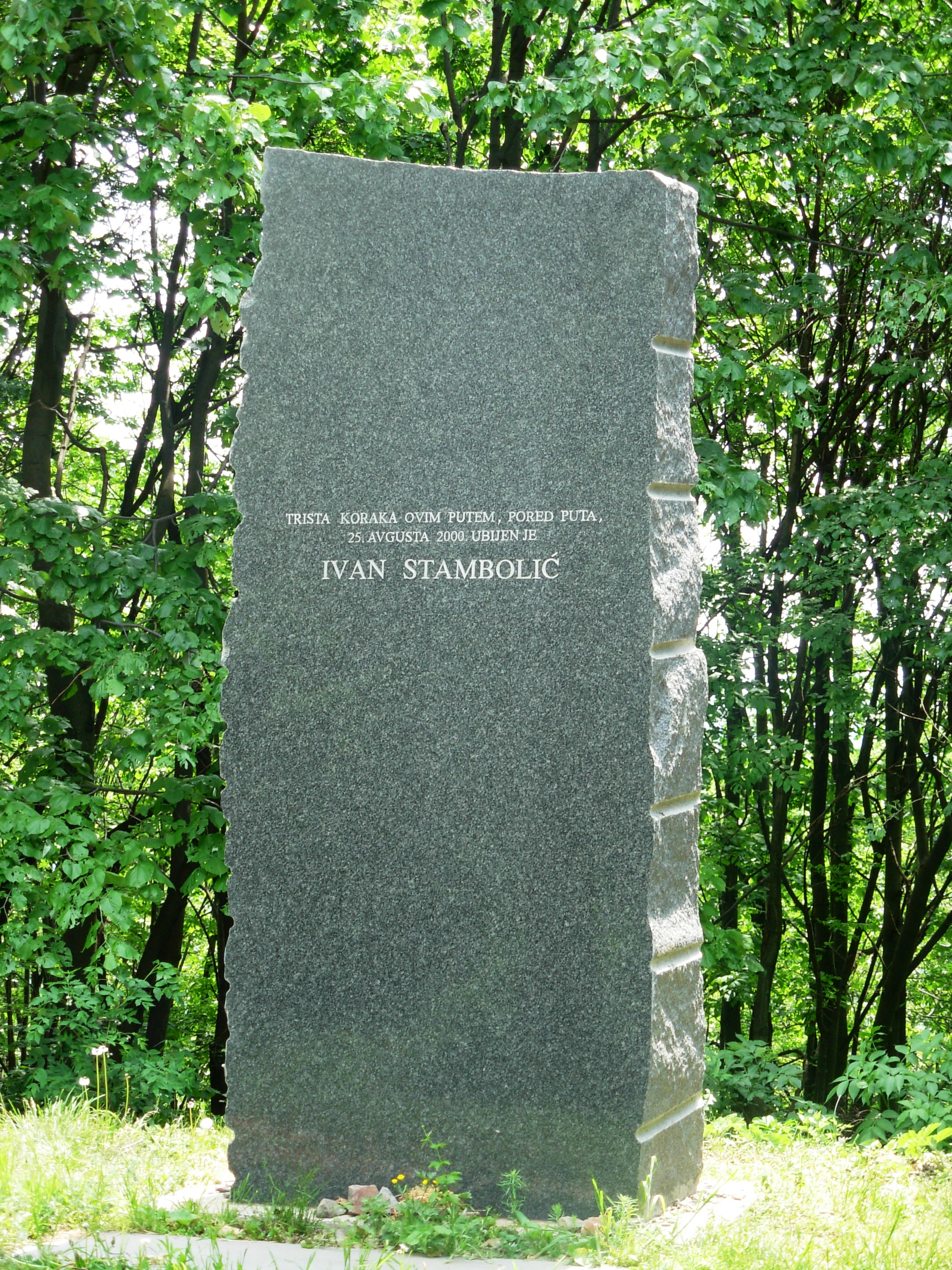
Stambolić was dismissed as president of Serbia shortly after the 8th session. He was later assassinated in 2000 on the orders of Milošević.

The session retired Pavlović permanently from public life; he died in 1996. Radoš Smiljković, a political science professor, was elected as Pavlović's successor as the president of the League of Communists of Belgrade City Committee. Stambolić was left politically isolated, and on 14 December 1987, he was removed from the position of the president of Serbia and replaced by a Milošević loyalist. On the proposal of Ante Marković, the future and last prime minister of Yugoslavia, Stambolić became the director of the Yugoslav Bank for International Economic Cooperation in November 1987. He remained in that role until 1997 when the Government of Federal Republic of Yugoslavia took over the bank. Milošević was also elected president of Serbia in 1990.

During the 1990s, Stambolić remained critical of Milošević and cooperated with opposition politicians such as Žarko Korać, Rasim Ljajić, and Nenad Čanak. Amidst the 1991 protests in Belgrade, Stambolić wrote Milošević a critical letter in which he called for him to resign. He later tried to make a political comeback in 2000; Čanak proposed him as the opposition candidate in the September 2000 Yugoslav general election. During this period, Stambolić retained close relations with the Šumadija Coalition. In an April 2000 interview, Stambolić said that "[Milošević's] fall from power will be hard and dramatic", while in a separate interview, Stambolić said that "the joint performance of the Serbian opposition would not only mean 'defeat' for Milošević, but a 'debacle' in the elections". He accepted to run as the Democratic Opposition of Serbia (DOS) candidate in the general elections, however, Stambolić disappeared in August 2000. According to witnesses on 25 August 2000, after Stambolić finished exercising in Košutnjak, a park-forest in Belgrade, he was thrown into a van while walking towards a restaurant.

Stambolić's remains were found during Operation Sabre in 2003 on Fruška Gora, where he was assassinated by members of the Special Operations Unit on the orders of Milošević. DOS eventually selected Vojislav Koštunica, who went onto defeat Milošević in the 2000 election. Milošević declined to accept the results and this ultimately led to his overthrow in October 2000.

== Legacy ==
The 8th session marked a turning point in the history of Serbia and Yugoslavia. LeBor, who wrote the book Milosevic: A Biography, said that Yugoslavia's history could have taken a different route if Pavlović had won the power struggle, stating, "He was the kind of thoughtful political leader who understood that, with the approaching end of Communism, Yugoslavia needed to move towards social democracy and political liberalisation". Milan Milošević, a Vreme journalist, said in 2018 that the 8th session left "consequences of which we still feel today", while Živana Olbina, a NIN magazine journalist who reported on the events in September 1987, described the session as historical. The writer Jovica Trkulja categorised the 8th session as part of a chain of events that led to the rise of Milošević.

The journalist Nedim Sejdinović said that there have been several interpretations of the 8th session. Sejdinović claims that the consensus among historians and political scientists is that if Pavlović and Stambolić had won the power struggle, the history of Yugoslavia would have been different. Political scientist Ljubinka Trgovčević similarly states that Yugoslavia "might have disintegrated, but there certainly would not have been any bloodshed". The political scientists Marc Hansmann, Elisabeth Bakke, and Ingo Peters said that the dissolution of Yugoslavia could have been "a less disastrous" if Milošević lost at the 8th session. The historian Branka Prpa also said that if Stambolić had won, Yugoslavia would have drifted towards a different path instead. Milan Kučan, Slovenia's first president, said that Yugoslavia's fate could have been different if the 8th session had not occur. Vllasi did not agree, and claimed that nationalistic tensions would have remained no matter if Stambolić and Pavlović had triumphed. However, Vllasi also said in 2020 that "there certainly would not be so much bad blood and, most importantly, those who continue to promote Milošević's today". Al Jazeera Balkans has also said that some political scientists claimed that the 8th session could not have had a different outcome than the one it had. Radosavljević said that Stambolić would have likely "negotiated, instead of going into war" in regards to the Yugoslav Wars. On the other hand, Borisav Jović believes that the session had no impact on the dissolution of Yugoslavia.

Dejan Jović said that Serbian nationalist intellectuals supported the dismissals of Pavlović and Stambolić. Although Dejan Jović, the political scientist Jasna Dragović-Soso, and journalists Slaviša Lekić and Zoran Pavić characterised the 8th session as a coup d'état, the political scientist Marko Grdešić argued that all events occurred in formal procedures and thus did not classify it as a coup d'état. The author and diplomat Louis Sell described the 8th session as a "public show trial", while the political scientist Duško Radosavljević described the 8th session as a "classic Stalinist purge". The political scientists Uwe Backes and Patrick Moreau said that the 8th session was Milošević's zero hour.

LeBor believes that Stambolić made a mistake believing that his long-lasting friendship with Milošević was enough to protect him in politics. Živorad Kovačević, a diplomat and former mayor of Belgrade, told Stambolić in 1987 that Milošević was "preparing something against you, behind your back"; Stambolić told him that those "rumours... are completely groundless". After Stambolić was dismissed from his office, Kovačević asked him "Ivan, do you remember what the last words I said to you were?" and Stambolić replied "Yes, you told me that I am stupid" and added "Well, there is some truth in that". Radoje Stefanović, Stambolić's associate and friend, recalled that Stambolić thought that before the 8th session "Milošević's nationalist policy will be met with criticism and people around him will become aware, you just have to be patient". Mitević also later affirmed that he had no regrets after writing the September 1987 letter that was presented as written by Stambolić.

In 2017, RTS published a documentary, The 8th Session: Birth Of A Leader (Osma sednica: Rađanje vođe), in which Vllasi, Jevtić, Borisav Jović, Smiljković, and Trgovčević were interviewed.

== See also ==
- Anti-bureaucratic revolution
- 1989 Serbian general election
- 14th Congress of the League of Communists of Yugoslavia
- 1990 Serbian constitutional referendum

== Sources ==
=== Books ===
- Backes, Uwe; Moreau, Patrick (2008). Communist and Post-Communist Parties in Europe. Göttingen, Germany: Vandenhoeck & Ruprecht. ISBN 978-3-525-36912-8. OCLC 301781500.
- Banac, Ivo (1988). With Stalin Against Tito: Cominformist Splits in Yugoslav Communism. Ithaca, New York: Cornell University Press. ISBN 978-1-5017-2083-3. OCLC 1083573283.
- Bideleux, Robert; Jeffries, Ian (2007). The Balkans: A Post-Communist History. London: Taylor & Francis. ISBN 978-1-134-58328-7. OCLC 85373407.
- Biondich, Mark (2011). The Balkans: Revolution, War, and Political Violence Since 1878. Oxford, United Kingdom: Oxford University Press. ISBN 978-0-19-929905-8. OCLC 718575569.
- Centrih, Lev (2014). The Road to Collapse: The Demise of the League of Communists of Yugoslavia. Belgrade: Rosa Luxemburg Foundation Southeast Europe. ISBN 978-86-88745-13-0. OCLC 1356439329.
- Crampton, Richard J. (1997). Eastern Europe in the Twentieth Century - And After. London: Routledge. ISBN 978-0-415-16423-8. OCLC 1277420255.
- Čalić, Marie–Janine (2019). A History of Yugoslavia (1 ed.). West Lafayette, Indiana: Purdue University Press. ISBN 978-1-61249-564-4. OCLC 1086547547.
- Derbyshire, Denis J.; Derbyshire, Ian (2000). Encyclopedia of World Political Systems. Armonk, New York: Taylor & Francis. ISBN 978-1-317-47156-1. OCLC 948249715.
- Djokić, Dejan (2003). Yugoslavism: Histories of a Failed Idea, 1918–1992. London: C. Hurst & Co. ISBN 978-0-299-18620-3. OCLC 51093251.
- Djokić, Dejan (2023). A Concise History of Serbia. Cambridge: Cambridge University Press. ISBN 978-1-107-02838-8. OCLC 1321819098.
- Donia, Robert J. (2014). Radovan Karadžić: Architect of the Bosnian Genocide. New York City: Cambridge University Press. ISBN 978-1-107-07335-7. OCLC 896872528.
- Dragović-Soso, Jasna (2002). Saviours of the Nation?: Serbia's Intellectual Opposition and the Revival of Nationalism. Montreal, Canada: McGill-Queen's University Press. ISBN 978-0-7735-2523-8. OCLC 704745756.
- Dyker, David A.; Vejvoda, Ivan (2014). Yugoslavia and After: A Study in Fragmentation, Despair and Rebirth. Abingdon-on-Thames: Routledge. ISBN 978-1-317-89135-2. OCLC 891447279.
- Goulbourne, Harry (2001). Race and Ethnicity: Solidarities and Communities. London: Routledge. ISBN 978-0-415-22501-4. OCLC 47002248.
- Grdešić, Marko (2019). The Shape of Populism: Serbia Before the Disoslution of Yugoslavia. Ann Arbor, Michigan: University of Michigan Press. ISBN 978-0-472-13133-4. OCLC 1099528798.
- Haass, Richard (1998). Economic Sanctions and American Diplomacy. Manhattan, New York City: Council on Foreign Relations. ISBN 978-0-87609-212-5. OCLC 38993152.
- Hansmann, Marc; Bakke, Elisabeth; Peters, Ingo (2012). 20 Years Since the Fall of the Berlin Wall: Transitions, State Break-Up and Democratic Politics in Central Europe and Germany. Berlin: BWV Berliner Wissenschafts-Verlag. ISBN 978-3-8305-2702-2. OCLC 909055412.
- Ingrao, Charles; Emmert, Thomas (2013). Conflict in Southeastern Europe at the End of the Twentieth Century: A "Scholars' Initiative" Assesses Some of the Controversies. Taylor & Francis. ISBN 978-1-317-97016-3. OCLC 1307519158.
- Jović, Dejan (2009). Yugoslavia: A State That Withered Away. West Lafayette, Indiana: Purdue University Press. ISBN 978-1-55753-495-8. OCLC 225531506.
- Jowitt, Kenneth; Sil, Rudra; Howard, Marc Morje; Tismaneanu, Vladimir (2007). World Order After Leninism. Seattle, Washington: University of Washington Press. ISBN 978-0-295-98628-9. OCLC 1273306665.
- Kelly, Michael J. (2005). Nowhere to Hide: Defeat of the Sovereign Immunity Defense for Crimes of Genocide and the Trials of Slobodan Milosevic and Saddam Hussein. New York City: Peter Lang. ISBN 978-0-8204-7835-7. OCLC 57068490.
- Koinova, Maria (2013). Ethnonationalist Conflict in Postcommunist States: Varieties of Governance in Bulgaria, Macedonia, and Kosovo. Philadelphia, Pennsylvania: University of Pennsylvania Press. ISBN 978-0-8122-0837-5. OCLC 859161691.
- Kurspahić, Kemal (2003). Prime Time Crime: Balkan Media in War and Peace. Washington, D.C.: United States Institute of Peace Press. ISBN 978-1-929223-39-8. OCLC 50755952.
- Lampe, John R. (2000). Yugoslavia as History: Twice There Was a Country (2 ed.). Cambridge, United Kingdom: Cambridge University Press. ISBN 978-0-521-77357-7. OCLC 917768569.
- LeBor, Adam (2003). Milosevic: A Biography. London: Bloomsbury Publishing. ISBN 978-0-7475-6181-1. OCLC 53069615.
- MacDonald, David Bruce (2002). Balkan Holocausts?: Serbian and Croatian Victim Centered Propaganda and the War in Yugoslavia. Manchester: Manchester University Press. ISBN 978-0-7190-6466-1. OCLC 994549135.
- Martinov, Zlatoje (2000). U podnožju demokratskih propileja: Izbori u Srbiji, 1990–2000 [At the Pedestal of the Democratic Propylaea: Elections in Serbia, 1990–2000] (in Serbian). Belgrade: Republika. OCLC 50410508.
- Meier, Viktor (1999). Yugoslavia: A History of Its Demise. London: Routledge. ISBN 978-0-203-98186-3. OCLC 1086424079.
- Mertus, Julie (1999). Kosovo: How Myths and Truths Started a War. Berkeley, California: University of California Press. ISBN 978-0-520-20962-6. OCLC 1224279284.
- Nedović, Slobodanka (2001). Oko izbora 4: Izveštaj sa parlamentarnih i predsedničkih izbora u SRJ i pokrajinskih izbora u Vojvodini (septembar-oktobar 2000) [Oko izbora 4: Report of the Parliamentary and Presidential Elections in the FRY and Provincial Elections in Vojvodina (September–October 2000)] (in Serbian). CeSID. OCLC 56212038.
- O'Leary, Brendan; McGarry, John; Moore, Margaret; Mabry, Tristan James (2013). Divided Nations and European Integration. Philadelphia, Pennsylvania: University of Pennsylvania Press. ISBN 978-0-8122-0827-6. OCLC 857711615.
- Pavković, Aleksandar (2000). The Fragmentation of Yugoslavia: Nationalism and War in the Balkans (2 ed.). Basingstoke: Palgrave Macmillan. ISBN 978-0-312-23084-5. OCLC 248869486.
- Ramet, Sabrina P. (2006). The Three Yugoslavias: State-building and Legitimation, 1918–2005. Washington, D.C.: Woodrow Wilson Center Press. ISBN 978-0-253-34656-8. OCLC 61687845.
- Ridgeway, James; Udovički, Jasminka (2000). Burn This House: The Making and Unmaking of Yugoslavia. Durham, North Carolina: Duke University Press. ISBN 978-0-8223-8091-7. OCLC 55843117.
- Saxena, Shalini (2015). Dictatorship, Fascism, and Totalitarianism. New York City: Britannica Educational Publishing. ISBN 978-1-62275-351-2. OCLC 890726393.
- Sell, Louis (2002). Slobodan Milosevic and the Destruction of Yugoslavia. Durham, North Carolina: Duke University Press. ISBN 978-0-8223-3223-7. OCLC 52919756.
- Spasić, Ivana; Subotić, Milan (2001). Revolution and Order: Serbia After October 2000. Belgrade: Institute for Philosophy and Social Theory. ISBN 978-86-82417-03-3. OCLC 51085213.
- Stojšić, Đorđe (2014). Osma sednica: kako je Slobodan Milošević pobedio a Srbija istorijski izgubila [The Eighth Session: How Slobodan Milošević Won and Serbia Historically Lost] (in Serbian). Belgrade: Dan Graf. ISBN 978-86-83517-82-4. OCLC 910708243.
- Tromp, Nevenka (2016). Prosecuting Slobodan Milošević: The Unfinished Trial. London: Routledge. ISBN 978-1-317-33527-6. OCLC 1100656919.
- Woodward, Susan L. (1997). Balkan Tragedy: Chaos and Dissolution After the Cold War. Washington, D.C.: Brookings Institution Press. ISBN 978-0-8157-9514-8. OCLC 898912184.
- Woodward, Susan L. (1995). Socialist Unemployment: The Political Economy of Yugoslavia, 1945–1990. Princeton, New Jersey: Princeton University Press. ISBN 978-0-691-08645-3. OCLC 1248760033.
- East European Economies: Slow Growth in the 1980's: Selected Papers. Vol. 3. Washington, D.C.: U.S. Government Printing Office. 1986. OCLC 12789742.
- Situation in Kosovo: Hearing Before the Subcommittee on Europe and the Middle East of the Committee on Foreign Affairs. Vol. 4. Washington, D.C.: U.S. Government Printing Office. 1994. OCLC 680837147.

=== Journal articles ===
- Đilas, Aleksa (1993). "A Profile of Slobodan Milošević". Foreign Affairs. 72 (3): 81–96. doi:10.2307/20045624. ISSN 0015-7120. JSTOR 20045624.
- Logoreci, Anton (1982). "Riots and trials in Kosovo: Why the Albanian population in Yugoslavia took to the streets". Index on Censorship. 11 (2): 23–25. doi:10.1080/03064228208533359. ISSN 0306-4220. S2CID 141936401.
- Nikolić, Kosta (2006). "Kako je Slobodan Milošević izabran za vođu srpskih komunista" [How Slobodan Milošević Got Elected for the Leader of Serbian Communists]. Istorija 20. veka (in Serbian). 24 (1). ISSN 0352-3160.
- Nikolić, Kosta (2006). "Kako je Slobodan Milošević izabran za vođu srpskih komunista (II)" [How Slobodan Milošević Got Elected for the Leader of Serbian Communists (II)]. Istorija 20. veka (in Serbian). 24 (2). ISSN 0352-3160.
- Primorac, Emil; Babić, Mate (1989). "Systemic Changes and Unemployment Growth in Yugoslavia, 1965–1984". Slavic Review. 48 (2): 195–213. doi:10.2307/2499113. ISSN 0037-6779. JSTOR 2499113. S2CID 4809340.
- Sell, Louis (1999). "The (Un)Making of Milosevic". The Wilson Quarterly. 23 (3). ISSN 0363-3276.
- Vladisavljević, Nebojša (2007). "Institutional Power and the Rise of Milošević". The Journal of Nationalism and Ethnicity. 32 (1): 183–205. doi:10.1080/0090599042000186160. ISSN 0090-5992. S2CID 154090422.

=== News articles ===
- Antonić, Slobodan (16 September 2007). "Da je samo jedan čovek" [If There is Only One Man]. Politika (in Serbian). Archived from the original on 31 August 2023.
- Diehl, Jackson (20 November 1987). "New Serbian Leader Accused of Adding to Ethnic Tension". The Washington Post. Archived from the original on 15 August 2023.
- Georgievski, Jovana (25 August 2020). "Fatalni zaokret: Od najbližeg saradnika do poslednje žrtve režima Slobodana Miloševića" [Fatal U-Turn: From the Closest Collaborator to the Last Victim of Slobodan Milošević's Regime]. BBC News (in Serbian). Archived from the original on 11 August 2023.
- Hall, Richard Andrew (28 May 2003). "East European Perspectives". Radio Free Europe/Radio Liberty. Vol. 5, no. 11. Archived from the original on 30 August 2023.
- Judah, Tim (13 October 2002). "Review: Inside the Circle". The Guardian. Archived from the original on 9 September 2014.
- Mihovilović, Maroje (2 April 2003). "Milošević's Greatest Betrayal: How Milošević Killed His Best Friend". Nacional. Archived from the original on 11 August 2023.
- Milošević, Milan (13 September 2018). "1987 – Trenutak istine Dragiše Pavlovića" [1987 – Dragiša Pavlović's Moment of Truth]. Vreme (in Serbian). Archived from the original on 5 November 2022.
- Partos, Gabriel (29 March 2003). "Ivan Stambolic: Mentor of Milosevic Stabbed in the Back by His Protégé". The Independent. Archived from the original on 5 April 2023.
- Preradović, Zoran; Baxhaku, Gëzim; Karabegović, Dženana; Vežić, Goran; Јanković, Srđan (21 September 2007). "Osma sednica – da li je moglo biti drugačije?" [The Eight Session – Could Have Been it Different?]. Radio Free Europe/Radio Liberty (in Serbian). Archived from the original on 30 August 2023.
- Radovanović, Zoran (5 April 2003). "Ivan Stambolić je prihvatio predsedničku kandidaturu" [Ivan Stambolić Accepted the Presidential Nomination]. B92 (in Serbian). Archived from the original on 30 August 2023.
- Stambolić, Ivan (25 August 2008). "Poslednje pismo Slobodanu Miloševiću" [The Last Letter to Slobodan Milošević]. Peščanik (in Serbian). Archived from the original on 25 August 2022.
- Sejdinović, Nedim (24 September 2020). "Osma sjednica još nije završena: Dani kada je postalo jasno da je rat neizbježan?" [The Eighth Session is Not Over Yet: The Days When It Became Clear That War was Inevitable?]. Al Jazeera Balkans (in Serbian). Archived from the original on 30 August 2023.
- Stojšić, Đorđe (8 August 2014). "Kako je pripremana Osma sednica" [How Was the Eighth Session Prepared]. Danas (in Serbian). Archived from the original on 29 August 2023.
- Traynor, Ian (1 April 2003). "Obituary: Ivan Stambolic". The Guardian. Archived from the original on 4 April 2023.
- Vujić, Predrag (24 September 2020). "Srbija, dvadeset godina kasnije: Dan kad je opozicija pobedila Slobodana Miloševića" [Serbia, Twenty Years Later: The Day When the Opposition Won Over Slobodan Milošević]. BBC News (in Serbian). Archived from the original on 27 August 2023.
- "Nestao Ivan Stambolić" [Ivan Stambolić is Missing]. B92 (in Serbian). 25 August 2000. Archived from the original on 30 August 2023.
- "B92 Specijal: Gde je Ivan Stambolić?: O Ivanu Stamboliću" [B92 Special: Where is Ivan Stambolić?: About Ivan Stambolić]. B92 (in Serbian). 2002. Archived from the original on 26 December 2002.
- "Ne sme niko da vas bije: Rečenica koja je promenila sve" [No One Will Dare to Beat You: The Sentence That Changed Everything]. N1 (in Serbian). 24 April 2023. Archived from the original on 13 August 2023.
- "Preminuo Borisav Jović" [Borisav Jović Died]. Politika (in Serbian). 13 September 2021.
- "Osma sednica: Rađanje vođe" [The Eighth Session: The Birth of the Leader]. Radio Television of Serbia (in Serbian). 3 October 2017. Archived from the original on 30 August 2023.
- "Timeline – Serbia, 20 years Since Milosevic Came to Power". Reuters. 30 September 2010. Archived from the original on 31 August 2023.
