= Secretary of the Presidency of the League of Communists of Vojvodina =

Administrative leader of the League of Communists of Vojvodina

- Serbian: Секретар Председништва Савеза комуниста Војводине
- Emblems of the LCY
- Type: Chief of staff
- Member of: SKV Presidency
- Appointer: SKV Presidency
- Term length: Two years, renewable (1972–1990)
- Constituting instrument: LCY Charter & SKV Charter
- Formation: 4 November 1966
- First holder: Mirko Čanadanović
- Final holder: Emilija Bruner-Bala
- Abolished: 17 July 1990

The secretary was the highest administrative leader of the Presidency of the Provincial Committee of the League of Communists of Vojvodina (SKV), the ruling party of the Socialist Autonomous Province of Vojvodina (SAPV) of the Socialist Republic of Serbia (SR of Serbia) in the Socialist Federal Republic of Yugoslavia and a branch of the League of Communists of Yugoslavia (LCY). The officeholder was elected by and answerable to the SKV Presidency.

== Office history ==
| Title | Established | Abolished | Established by |
|---|---|---|---|
| Secretary of the Executive Bureau of the Provincial Committee of the League of Communists of Vojvodina; Serbian: Секретар Извршног бироа Покрајинског комитета Савеза комуниста Војводине | 4 November 1966 | 25 April 1974 | ? Plenary Session of the Central Committee of the SKS 5th Congress |
| Secretary of the Executive Committee of the Provincial Committee of the League of Communists of Vojvodina; Serbian: Секретар Извршног комитета Покрајинског комитета Савеза комуниста Војводине | 25 April 1974 | 31 May 1978 | 15th Provincial Conference of the League of Communists of Vojvodina |
| Secretary of the Presidency of the Provincial Committee of the League of Communists of Vojvodina; Serbian: Секретар Председништва Покрајинског комитета Савеза комуниста Војводине | 31 May 1978 | 17 July 1990 | 16th Provincial Conference of the League of Communists of Vojvodina |

== Officeholders ==
Secretaries of the Presidency of the Central Committee of the League of Communists of Vojvodina
| No. | Name | Took office | Left office | Tenure | Term of office | Birth | PM | Death | Nation | Ref. |
|---|---|---|---|---|---|---|---|---|---|---|
| 1 | Mirko Čanadanović | 4 November 1966 | 21 March 1969 | 2 years, 137 days | 13th–14th (1965–1974) | 1936 | 1957 | Alive | Serb | |
| 2 | Miloš Radojčin | 21 March 1969 | 18 December 1972 | 3 years, 272 days | 14th (1968–1974) | 1925 | 1944 | ? | Serb | |
| 3 | Jon Srbovan | 18 December 1972 | 19 April 1974 | 1 year, 122 days | 14th (1968–1974) | 1930 | 1951 | 2018 | Romanian | |
| 4 | Nándor Major | 19 April 1974 | 28 April 1978 | 4 years, 9 days | 15th (1974–1978) | 1931 | 1952 | 2022 | Hungarian | |
| 5 | Boško Krunić | 28 April 1978 | 25 April 1982 | 3 years, 361 days | 16th (1978–1982) | 1929 | 1945 | 2017 | Serb | |
| 6 | Sreta Stajić | 25 April 1982 | 28 April 1984 | 2 years, 4 days | 17th (1982–1986) | 1912 | 1944 | ? | Serb | |
| 7 | Katalin Hajnal | 28 April 1984 | 26 April 1986 | 1 year, 363 days | 18th (1986–1989) | 1944 | 1963 | ? | Hungarian | |
| 8 | Milovan Šogorov | 26 April 1986 | 25 April 1988 | 1 year, 365 days | 18th (1986–1989) | 1941 | 1960 | 2020 | Serb | |
| 9 | Janko Drča | 25 April 1988 | 6 October 1988 | 164 days | 18th (1986–1989) | 1943 | 1960 | Alive | Yugoslav | |
| 10 | Miodrag Koprivica | 6 October 1988 | 21 January 1989 | 107 days | 18th (1986–1989) | 1951 | ? | Alive | Serb | |
| 11 | Emilija Bruner-Bala | 21 January 1989 | 17 July 1990 | 1 year, 177 days | 19th (1989–1991) | 1954 | ? | ? | Hungarian | |

== Bibliography ==
=== Books ===
- 8th Congress of the League of Communists of Croatia (1978). Stenografske bilješke [Stenographic Notes] (in Serbo-Croatian). Vol. 8, No. 4. Naprijed.
- Rajović, Radošin, ed. (1970). Jugoslovenski savremenici: Ko je ko u Jugoslaviji [Yugoslav Contemporaries: Who's Who in Yugoslavia] (in Serbo-Croatian). Hronometar.
- Lewytzkyj, Borys; Stroynowski, Juliusz, eds. (1978). Who's Who in the Socialist Countries. K. G. Saur Verlag. ISBN 3-7940-3017-6.
- Marković, Dragan; Kržavac, Savo (1985). Zašto su smenjivani [Why Were They Replaced?] (in Serbo-Croatian). Partizanska knj.
- Staff writer (1982). Politički i poslovni imenik [Political and Business Directory] (in Serbo-Croatian). Telegraphic Agency of New Yugoslavia.
- Stallaerts, Robert (2003). Historical Dictionary of the Republic of Croatia (in Serbo-Croatian). Scarecrow Press. ISBN 0-8108-2999-1.
- Stroynowski, Juliusz, ed. (1989a). Who's Who in the Socialist Countries of Europe: A–H. K. G. Saur Verlag. ISBN 3-598-10719-6.
- Stroynowski, Juliusz, ed. (1989b). Who's Who in the Socialist Countries of Europe: I–O. K. G. Saur Verlag. ISBN 3-598-10719-6.
- Stroynowski, Juliusz, ed. (1989c). Who's Who in the Socialist Countries of Europe: P–Z. K. G. Saur Verlag. ISBN 3-598-10719-6.

=== Newspapers ===
- Staff writer (17 May 1982). "Чланови Савезног извршног већа" [Members of the Federal Executive Council]. Borba (in Serbo-Croatian). Socialist Alliance of Working People: 4.
