= Steffen Kailitz =

German political scientist (born 1969)

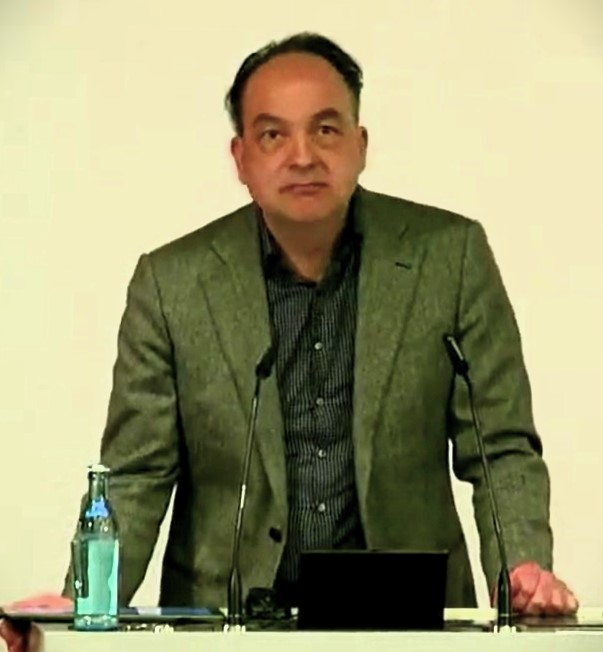
- Kailitz speaks at SLUB Dresden in 2024
- Born: 18 May 1969 (age 57)
- Education: Chemnitz University of Technology
- Scientific career
- Fields: Political science
- Workplaces: Hannah Arendt Institute for Research on Totalitarianism

Steffen Kailitz (born 18 May 1969) is a German political scientist and a senior research fellow at the Hannah Arendt Institute for Research on Totalitarianism. He specializes in comparative studies of democracy, extremism, totalitarianism, electoral systems and studies of political parties. He has also testified as an expert witness before the Federal Constitutional Court, the Parliament of Bavaria and other government authorities.

Kailitz earned a PhD in political science at Chemnitz University of Technology in 1999; his doctoral advisor was Eckhard Jesse. He has worked as a researcher at Chemnitz University of Technology since 1998 and earned his habilitation in 2005.

Following his critical comments regarding the far-right NPD party, the party initiated legal proceedings against him that were eventually dismissed by the court.

== Bibliography ==
- Die politische Deutungskultur im Spiegel des „Historikerstreits“. What's right? What's left?. Westdeutscher Verlag, Wiesbaden 2001, ISBN 3-531-13701-8 (TU Chemnitz 1999).
- Aktuelle Entwicklungen im deutschen Rechtsextremismus (= Zukunftsforum Politik. No. 17). Konrad Adenauer Foundation, Sankt Augustin 2000.
- Politischer Extremismus in der Bundesrepublik Deutschland. Eine Einführung. VS Verlag für Sozialwissenschaften, Wiesbaden 2004, ISBN 3-531-14193-7.
- Rechtsextremismus in der Bundesrepublik Deutschland. Auf dem Weg zur "Volksfront"? (= Zukunftsforum Politik. No. 65). Konrad Adenauer Foundation, Sankt Augustin 2005, ISBN 3-937731-44-X.
