= League of Communists of Vojvodina =

League of Communists of Vojvodina Savez komunista Vojvodine Савез комуниста Војводине Vajdasági kommunisták ligája
- Leader: President of the League of Communists of Vojvodina
- Founded: 1943
- Dissolved: 16 July 1990
- Preceded by: Provincial Committee for Vojvodina
- Succeeded by: Socialist Party of Serbia; League of Social Democrats of Vojvodina
- Headquarters: Novi Sad, SAP Vojvodina, SR Serbia, Yugoslavia
- Ideology: Communism; Marxism–Leninism; Titoism
- Political position: Left-wing to far-left
- Colours: Red

Party flag
- Politics of Vojvodina; Vojvodina branch of the League of Communists of Yugoslavia

The League of Communists of Vojvodina (Serbo-Croatian: Савез комуниста Војводине, Savez komunista Vojvodine, Hungarian: Vajdasági kommunisták ligája; SKV) was the Vojvodina branch of the League of Communists of Yugoslavia.

== History ==
It was officially established on 21 December 1968 from the then Provincial Committee of the League of Communists of Serbia for Vojvodina, which was formed in 1919 as the Provincial Committee of the Communist Party of Yugoslavia for Vojvodina. After the formation of the Communist Party of Serbia in May 1945, the Provincial Committee for Vojvodina became part of it. Although it was a provincial organization, in the early 1970s, together with the League of Communists of Kosovo, it began to develop into a separate organization, which became independent of the League of Communists of Serbia. This situation led to a conflict between the leaderships of the LCV and the LCS, which culminated in October 1988 with the Anti-bureaucratic revolution during which the provincial leadership was replaced, and the LCS re-established control over this provincial organization.

It ceased to exist on 16 July 1990, when the First Conference of the Provincial Organization of the Socialist Party of Serbia for Vojvodina was held, at which the League of Communists of Vojvodina and the Socialist League of the Working People of Vojvodina merged, given that in July of the same year the League of Communists of Serbia transformed into the Socialist Party of Serbia (SPS). Part of the membership of the LCV then joined the SPS and became part of its Provincial Committee.

Another faction of the LCV, led by Nenad Čanak, formed the League of Social Democrats of Vojvodina on 14 July 1990, two days before the LCV officially dissolved.

== Party leaders ==
1. Isa Jovanović (1943) (1906–1983)
2. Jovan Veselinov (1943 – 1946) (1907–1982)
3. Dobrivoje Vidić (1946 – May 1951) (1918–1991)
4. Stevan Doronjski (May 1951 – 1966) (1919–1981)
5. Mirko Tepavac (1966 – 1969) (1922–2014)
6. Mirko Čanadanović (1969 – 24 December 1972) (b. 1936)
7. Dušan Alimpić (24 December 1972 – 28 April 1981) (1921–2002)
8. Boško Krunić (28 April 1981 – 28 April 1982) (1929–2017)
9. Marko Đuričin (28 April 1982 – 28 April 1983) (1925–2013)
10. Slavko Veselinov (28 April 1983 – 28 April 1984) (1925–1997)
11. Boško Krunić (28 April 1984 – 24 April 1985) (1929–2017)
12. Đorđe Stojšić (24 April 1985 – 1988) (1928–2014)
13. Milovan Šogorov (1988 – 6 October 1988) (1941–2020)
14. Boško Kovačević (14 November 1988 – 20 January 1989) (1946–2023)
15. Nedeljko Šipovac (20 January 1989 – 16 July 1990) (1942–2025)

== See also ==
- History of Vojvodina
- League of Communists of Yugoslavia
  - League of Communists of Bosnia and Herzegovina
  - League of Communists of Croatia
  - League of Communists of Macedonia
  - League of Communists of Montenegro
  - League of Communists of Serbia
    - League of Communists of Kosovo
  - League of Communists of Slovenia
- List of leaders of communist Yugoslavia
- Socialist Federal Republic of Yugoslavia
