= President of the League of Communists of Vojvodina =

Leader of the League of Communists of Vojvodina

- Serbian: Председник Савеза Комуниста Војводине
- Emblems of the LCY

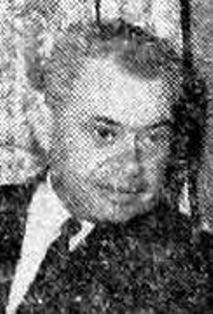
- Longest serving Stevan Doronjski; 1951–1966
- Type: Party leader
- Member of: LCY Presidency and SAPV Presidency
- Appointer: LCV Provincial Committee
- Term length: One years, renewable (1982–1991)
- Constituting instrument: LCY Charter & LCV Charter
- Formation: 12 May 1945
- First holder: Jovan Veselinov
- Final holder: Nedeljko Šipovac
- Abolished: 17 July 1990

The president was the leader of the League of Communists of Vojvodina (LCV), the ruling party of the Socialist Autonomous Province of Vojvodina (SAPV) of the Socialist Republic of Serbia in the Socialist Federal Republic of Yugoslavia. The LCV was the provincial organisation of the League of Communists of Serbia (LCS) in Vojvodina. Party rules stipulated that the LCV Central Committee elected the president. Moreover, the Central Committee was empowered to remove the president. The president served ex officio as a member of the Presidency of the Central Committee of the League of Communists of Yugoslavia (LCY) and of the SAPV Presidency. To be eligible to serve, the president had to be a member of the LCV Executive Committee of the LCV Provincial Committee.

The office traces its lineage back to the office of "Secretary of the Provincial Committee of the Communist Party of Yugoslavia for Vojvodina", established sometime in 1919. As a provincial committee, the Vojvodina communists had no distinct rights and were under the jurisdiction of the Serbian Central Committee. The LCY 6th Congress on 2–7 November 1952, renamed the party League of Communists, and the Vojvodina branch followed suit and changed its name to League of Communists of Vojvodina. On 4 October 1966, the 5th Plenary Session of the Central Committee of the LCY 8th Congress abolished the office of General Secretary at the national level and replaced with the office of President. The LSC Central Committee convened a meeting in 1966 that abolished the office of secretary and established the "President of the Provincial Committee of the League of Communists of Vojvodina". The reforms passed by the LCY Central Committee plenum strengthened the powers of the provincial branches of Kosovo and Vojvodina and gave more powers to the LCV party leader. In 1981, the LCV introduced another set of reforms that abolished the existing office and replaced it with the "President of the Presidency of the Provincial Committee of the League of Communists of Vojvodina". This office was retained until 17 July 1990, when the League of Communists of Serbia changed its name to the "Socialist Party of Serbia".

== Office history ==
Title	Established	Abolished	Established by
Secretary of the Provincial Committee of the Communist Party of Yugoslavia for Vojvodina; Serbian: Секретар Покрајинског комитета Комунистичке партије Југославије за Војводину	20 April 1919	May 1945	1st Congress of the Socialist Labour Party of Yugoslavia (Communists)
Secretary of the Provincial Committee of the League of Communists of Serbia for Vojvodina; Serbian: Секретар Покрајинског комитета Савеза комуниста Србије за Војводину	May 1945	1966	?
President of the Provincial Committee of the League of Communists of Serbia for Vojvodina; Serbian: Председник Покрајинског комитета Савеза комуниста Србије за Војводину	1966	28 April 1981	? Plenary Session of the Central Committee of the 5th Congress of the League of Communists of Serbia
President of the Presidency of the Provincial Committee of the League of Communists of Serbia for Vojvodina; Serbian: Председник Председништва Покрајинског комитета Савеза комуниста Србије за Војводину	28 April 1981	17 July 1990	? Session of the Provincial Committee of the 16th Conference of the League of Communists of Vojvodina

== Officeholders ==
=== CPY Provincial Committee (1919–1945) ===
Secretaries of the Provincial Committee of the Communist Party of Yugoslavia for Kosovo
Name	Took office	Left office	Term of office	Birth	PM	Death	Ref.
Jovan Veselinov	Before 1936	1936 or before	4th (1935–1938)	1906	1923	1982	
Lazar Milankov	1936	1936	4th (1935–1938)	1908	?	?	
Žarko Zrenjanin	1938	4 November 1942	5th–6th (1938–1945)	1902	1927	1942	
Jovan Veselinov	January 1943	12 May 1945	6th–7th (1940–1945)	1906	1923	1982	

=== LCS Provincial Committee (1945–1990) ===
Presidents of the Provincial Committee of the League of Communists of Serbia for Vojvodina
No.	Name	Took office	Left office	Tenure	Term of office	Birth	PM	Death	Ref.
1	Jovan Veselinov	12 May 1945	November 1946	184 days	7th (1945–1951)	1906	1923	1982	
2	Dobrivoje Vidić	November 1946	May 1951	4 years, 181 days	7th–8th (1945–1951)	1918	1939	1992	
3	Stevan Doronjski	May 1951	4 November 1966	15 years, 187 days	9th–13th (1951–1968)	1919	1939	1981	
4	Mirko Tepavac	4 November 1966	21 March 1969	2 years, 137 days	13th–14th (1965–1974)	1922	1942	2014	
5	Mirko Čanadanović	21 March 1969	18 December 1972	3 years, 272 days	14th (1968–1974)	1936	1957	Alive	
6	Dušan Alimpić	24 December 1972	28 April 1981	9 years, 125 days	14th–16th (1968–1982)	1921	1941	2002	
7	Boško Krunić	28 April 1981	28 April 1982	1 year, 0 days	16th (1978–1982)	1929	1946	2017	
8	Marko Đuričin	28 April 1982	28 April 1983	1 year, 0 days	17th (1982–1986)	1925	1948	2013	
9	Slavko Veselinov	28 April 1983	28 April 1984	1 year, 0 days	17th (1982–1986)	1925	1943	1997	
10	Boško Krunić	28 April 1984	24 April 1985	361 days	17th (1982–1986)	1929	1946	2017	
11	Đorđe Stojšić	24 April 1985	25 April 1988	3 years, 1 day	17th–18th (1986–1989)	1928	1945	2014	
12	Milovan Šogorov	25 April 1988	6 October 1988	164 days	18th (1986–1989)	1941	1960	2020	
13	Boško Kovačević	14 November 1988	20 January 1989	67 days	18th (1986–1989)	1946	?	2023	
14	Nedeljko Šipovac	20 January 1989	17 July 1990	1 year, 178 days	15th (1989–1990)	1942	1960	2025	

== Bibliography ==
- Kecić, Danilo; Palić, Milenko (1977). Revolucionarni radnički pokret u Zrenjaninu 1918–1941: 1935–1937 [Revolutionary Labour Movement in Zrenjanin 1918–1941: 1935–1937] (in Serbo-Croatian). Skupština opštine.
- Lewytzkyj, Borys; Stroynowski, Juliusz, eds. (1978). Who's Who in the Socialist Countries. K. G. Saur Verlag. ISBN 3-7940-3017-6.
- Stroynowski, Juliusz, ed. (1989a). Who's Who in the Socialist Countries of Europe: A–H. K. G. Saur Verlag. ISBN 3-598-10719-6.
- Stroynowski, Juliusz, ed. (1989b). Who's Who in the Socialist Countries of Europe: I–O. K. G. Saur Verlag. ISBN 3-598-10719-6.
- Stroynowski, Juliusz, ed. (1989c). Who's Who in the Socialist Countries of Europe: P–Z. K. G. Saur Verlag. ISBN 3-598-10719-6.
- Tito, Josip Broz (1977). Damjanović, Pero; Vujošević, Ubavka (eds.). Sabrana djela [Selected Works] (in Serbo-Croatian). Vol. 4. Komunist.
