= Eckhard Jesse =

German political scientist (born 1948)

- Born: 16 July 1948; Wurzen
- Scientific career
- Fields: Political science
- Institutions: Chemnitz University of Technology
- Thesis: Wahlrecht zwischen Kontinuität und Reform (1982)
- Doctoral advisors: Peter Haungs

Eckhard Jesse (born 16 July 1948) is a German political scientist. Born in Wurzen, Saxony, he held the chair for "political systems and political institutions" at the Technical University of Chemnitz from 1993 to 2014. Jesse is one of the best known German political scholars in the field of extremism and terrorism studies. He has also specialized in the study of German political parties and the German political system.

Together with Uwe Backes, director of the Hannah Arendt Institute for the Research on Totalitarianism, he has edited the Yearbook Extremism & Democracy since 1989; it has become a classic for terrorism scholars. He is one of the founders of the Veldensteiner group on extremism and democracy research. Jesse writes extensively about extremism and political parties in several German newspapers.

== Publications ==
- Die Demokratie der Bundesrepublik Deutschland. Eine Einführung in das politische System. Colloquium-Verlag, Berlin 1978, ISBN 3-7678-0453-0; 8. aktualisierte und erweiterte Auflage: Nomos-Verlagsgesellschaft, Baden-Baden 1997, ISBN 3-7890-5213-2
- Streitbare Demokratie. Theorie, Praxis und Herausforderungen in der Bundesrepublik Deutschland. Colloquium-Verlag, Berlin 1980, ISBN 3-7678-0490-5; 2. durchgesehene Auflage ebd. 1981, 3-7678-0529-4
- (Hrsg.): Bundesrepublik Deutschland und Deutsche Demokratische Republik. Die beiden deutschen Staaten im Vergleich. Colloquium-Verlag, Berlin 1980, ISBN 3-7678-0518-9; 4. erweiterte Auflage ebd., ISBN 3-7678-0658-4
- Literaturführer: Parlamentarische Demokratie. Pluralismustheorie – politisches System der Bundesrepublik Deutschland – Parliamentarismus – Wahlen – Streitbare Demokratie – Systemvergleich. Leske und Budrich, Opladen 1981, ISBN 3-8100-0339-5
- with Uwe Backes: Totalitarismus, Extremismus, Terrorismus. Ein Literaturführer und Wegweiser zur Extremismusforschung in der Bundesrepublik Deutschland. Leske und Budrich, Opladen 1984; 2. aktualisierte und erweiterte Auflage ebd. 1985, ISBN 3-8100-0560-6
- Wahlrecht zwischen Kontinuität und Reform. Eine Analyse der Wahlrechtsdiskussion und der Wahlrechtsänderungen in der Bundesrepublik Deutschland 1949–1983. Droste, Düsseldorf 1985, ISBN 3-7700-5129-7.
- with Uwe Backes, Karl-Heinz Janßen, Hans Mommsen, Henning Köhler & Fritz Tobias: Reichstagsbrand – Aufklärung einer historischen Legende. Piper, München/Zürich 1986, ISBN 3-492-03027-0
- Renaissance der deutschen Frage? Klett, Stuttgart 1987, ISBN 3-12-436800-2
- Wahlen. Bundesrepublik Deutschland im Vergleich. Colloquium-Verlag, Berlin 1988, ISBN 3-7678-0689-4
- with Uwe Backes: Politischer Extremismus in der Bundesrepublik Deutschland. Verlag Wissenschaft und Politik, Köln 1989

Vol 1: Literatur. ISBN 3-8046-8695-8
Vol 2: Analyse. ISBN 3-8046-8727-X
Vol 3: Dokumentation. ISBN 3-8046-8728-8

- with Uwe Backes: Politischer Extremismus in der Bundesrepublik Deutschland. Bundeszentrale für Politische Bildung, Bonn 1989, ISBN 3-89331-040-1; 4. völlig überarbeitete und aktualisierte Auflage ebd. 1996, ISBN 3-89331-260-9
- with Uwe Backes & Rainer Zitelmann (Hrsg.): Die Schatten der Vergangenheit. Impulse zur Historisierung des Nationalsozialismus. Propyläen, Frankfurt/Berlin 1990, ISBN 3-549-07407-7; Ullstein, Frankfurt/Berlin 1992, ISBN 3-548-33161-0
- with Armin Mitter (Hrsg.): Die Gestaltung der deutschen Einheit. Geschichte, Politik, Gesellschaft. Bouvier, Bonn/Berlin 1992, ISBN 3-416-02364-1
- with Uwe Backes: "Totalitarismus und Totalitarismusforschung. Zur Renaissance einer lange tabuisierten Konzeption." In: Jahrbuch Extremismus & Demokratie 4, 1992
- "'Entnazifizierung' und 'Entstasifizierung' als politisches Problem." In: Josef Isensee (Hrsg.): Vergangenheitsbewältigung durch Recht. Drei Abhandlungen zu einem deutschen Problem. Duncker und Humblot, Berlin 1992, ISBN 3-428-07458-0
- Repräsentative Demokratie. Knoth, Melle 1995, ISBN 3-88368-272-1
- with Ralf Altenhof (Hrsg.): Das wiedervereinigte Deutschland. Zwischenbilanz und Perspektiven. Droste, Düsseldorf 1995, ISBN 3-7700-1050-7
- Totalitarismus im 20. Jahrhundert. Eine Bilanz der internationalen Forschung. Nomos-Verlagsgesellschaft, Baden-Baden 1996, ISBN 3-7890-4408-3; ebd. 1999, ISBN 3-7890-5954-4
- with Konrad Löw (Hrsg.): Vergangenheitsbewältigung. Duncker und Humblot, Berlin 1997, ISBN 3-428-09183-3
- with Steffen Kailitz (Hrsg.): Prägekräfte des 20. Jahrhunderts. Demokratie, Extremismus, Totalitarismus. Nomos-Verlagsgesellschaft, Baden-Baden 1997, ISBN 3-7890-4874-7
- with Konrad Löw (Hrsg.): Wahlen in Deutschland. Duncker und Humblot, Berlin 1998, ISBN 3-428-09616-9
- with Günther Heydemann (Hrsg.): Diktaturvergleich als Herausforderung. Theorie und Praxis. Duncker und Humblot, Berlin 1998, ISBN 3-428-09715-7
- (Hrsg.): Eine Revolution und ihre Folgen. 14 Bürgerrechtler ziehen Bilanz. Links, Berlin 2000, ISBN 3-86153-223-9
- with Manfred Agethen & Ehrhart Neubert (Hrsg.) : Der missbrauchte Antifaschismus. DDR-Staatsdoktrin und Lebenslüge der deutschen Linken. Herder, Freiburg/Basel/Wien 2002, ISBN 3-451-28017-5
- with Roland Sturm: Demokratien des 21. Jahrhunderts im Vergleich. Historische Zugänge, Gegenwartsprobleme, Reformperspektive. Leske und Budrich, Opladen 2003, ISBN 3-8100-3732-X
- (Hrsg.): Bilanz der Bundestagswahl 2002. Voraussetzungen, Ergebnisse, Folgen. Westdeutscher Verlag, Wiesbaden 2003, ISBN 3-531-14172-4
- (Hrsg.): Deutsche Geschichte. Vom Kaiserreich bis heute. Compact Verlag, München 2004, ISBN 3-8174-5626-3; Neuauflage ebd. 2006, ISBN 978-3-8174-6120-2
- with Alexander Gallus (Hrsg.): Staatsformen. Modelle politischer Ordnung von der Antike bis zur Gegenwart. Ein Handbuch. Böhlau, Köln/Weimar/Wien 2004, ISBN 3-412-07604-X; 2. aktualisierte und ergänzte Auflage: Staatsformen von der Antike bis zur Gegenwart. Ein Handbuch. ebd. 2007, ISBN 3-8252-8343-7
- with Uwe Backes: Vergleichende Extremismusforschung. Nomos, Baden-Baden 2005, ISBN 3-8329-0997-4.
- Der Umgang mit parteipolitischem Rechtsextremismus. Konrad-Adenauer-Stiftung, Sankt Augustin 2005, ISBN 3-937731-69-5
- with Günther Heydemann (Hrsg.): 15 Jahre deutsche Einheit. Deutsch-deutsche Begegnungen, deutsch-deutsche Beziehungen. Duncker und Humblot, Berlin 2006, ISBN 3-428-12130-9
- with Roland Sturm (Hrsg.): Bilanz der Bundestagswahl 2005. Voraussetzungen, Ergebnisse, Folgen. VS Verlag für Sozialwissenschaften, Wiesbaden 2006, ISBN 978-3-531-14968-4
- with Uwe Backes (Hrsg.): Gefährdungen der Freiheit. Extremistische Ideologien im Vergleich. Vandenhoeck und Ruprecht, Göttingen 2006, ISBN 3-525-36905-0
- (Hrsg.): Friedliche Revolution und deutsche Einheit. Sächsische Bürgerrechtler ziehen Bilanz. Links, Berlin 2006, ISBN 978-3-86153-379-5
- with Hans-Peter Niedermeier (Hrsg.): Politischer Extremismus und Parteien. Duncker & Humblot, Berlin 2007, ISBN 978-3-428-12596-8
- with Eckart Klein (Hrsg.): Das Parteienspektrum im wiedervereinigten Deutschland. Duncker & Humblot, Berlin 2007, ISBN 978-3-428-12624-8
- with Eberhard Sandschneider (Hrsg.): Neues Deutschland. Eine Bilanz der deutschen Wiedervereinigung. Nomos, Baden-Baden 2008, ISBN 978-3-8329-3197-1
- Demokratie in Deutschland. Diagnosen und Analysen. Böhlau, Köln/Weimar/Wien 2008, ISBN 978-3-412-20157-9
- with Jürgen P. Lang: Die Linke – der smarte Extremismus einer deutschen Partei. Olzog, München 2008, ISBN 978-3-7892-8257-7.

Der smarte Extremismus der Linken, Essay von Eckard Jesse in der Märkischen Allgemeinen, 2. Oktober 2008

- Die Parteiendemokratie in der Krise. Bachem, Köln 2008, ISBN 978-3-7616-2114-1
- Diktaturen in Deutschland. Diagnosen und Analysen. Nomos, Baden-Baden 2008, ISBN 978-3-8329-3679-2
