= Ideocracy =

State governed by a particular ideology

Ideocracy (a portmanteau word combining "ideology" and kratos, Greek for "power") is "governance of a state according to the principles of a particular (political) ideology; a state or country governed in this way". It is government based on a monistic ideology—as distinct from an authoritarian state, which is characterized by strong central power and limited political freedoms. An ideocratic state can either be totalitarian (citizens being forced to follow an ideology) or populist (citizens voluntarily following an ideology).

Every government has ideological bases from which assumptions and policies are drawn; ideocracies are governments wherein one dominant ideology has become deeply ingrained into politics and generally politics has become deeply ingrained into all or most aspects of society. The ideology of an ideocracy presents itself as an absolute, universal, and supreme system for understanding social life, much as a god in a monotheistic belief system.

== Analysis ==
Sidney and Beatrice Webb used the term ideocracy in 1936, and it was given added currency by Nicholas Berdyaev in 1947.

An ideocracy may take a totalitarian form, reliant on force, or a populist form, reliant on the voluntary support of true believers. The totalitarian form contains six components; 1) ideology, 2) a single party typically with one leader, 3) a terroristic police, 4) a monopoly of communications, 5) a monopoly of weaponry, 6) a centrally directed or planned economy.

Furthermore, Jaroslaw Piekalkiewicz and Alfred Wayne Penn state that an ideocracy such as a strict religious state or Nazi Germany will suppress scientific research and knowledge if it conflicts with the ideology. Piekalkiewicz and Penn argue that every state is either organic (the organized expression of a community, within which all individuals are dependent and subsumed, as the fingers belong to the body), or mechanical/pragmatic (an artificial concept in which individuals have rights against the state and are co-equal). As Adlai Stevenson II has said, "Since the beginning of time governments have been engaged in kicking people around. The astonishing achievement in modern times is the idea that citizens should do the kicking".

In the view of Piekalkiewicz and Penn, ideocracies derive political legitimacy from one of the following ideological sources: nation, race, class, or culture. They also believe that ideocrats will project their own feelings of guilt onto groups of people — Jews, communists, capitalists, heretics — as forces undermining the ideocracy. These scapegoats symbolize the forces that true believers must combat within themselves. Blame for failures of policy is diverted away from the ideocrats onto the scapegoats, who are subjected to mob attacks, terrorism, show trials, and stylized punishments. In Hitler's Germany the drive to exterminate the Jews eventually took priority over every other goal.

Citizens of pluralist states may emigrate freely, but those who leave an ideocracy may be branded as traitors.

== Psychological aspects ==
Individuals within ideocracies develop an authoritarian personality, say Piekalkiewicz and Penn, in order to succeed or survive. Long after the collapse of the ideocracy, these individuals remain resistant to democratization. They develop a closed mind in which their self-realization within the ideocracy overrides the hostility of the 'heretical' outside world. Simple slogans are adopted and repeated as signs of conformity and loyalty. Those who disbelieve the ideology are fatalistic, supporting the system because they feel powerless to change it, or Machiavellian, cynically exploiting the system for their own ends. Both groups develop a form of doublethink.

A small minority of self-actualisers, tolerant of ambiguity, are able to resist the monistic belief system and continue to search long-term for new ideas and complex answers.

== Inception, stabilization and evolution ==
According to Piekalkiewicz and Penn, ideocracies rise and fall in the following manner:

Inception

1. Civil war: As in the USSR, China, Cuba, Yugoslavia. In order to establish the ideocracy, there must be a ruthless charismatic leader: a Lenin, Mao, Castro, Tito.
2. Takeover: Usually a political party with a determined leader ("the leader is the movement") takes power by coup d'état, which creates a bandwagon effect: as in Fascist Italy and Nazi Germany, and in Iran.
3. In an isolated colony: e.g., White South Africa, and the Puritans of New England

Stabilization

This usually takes 10–15 years. The leader is no longer a Prophet, but is now deified. There is a purge of followers, and bureaucratization of the state and party. The economy is nationalized, and totally mobilized in support of the ideocracy. There will be scapegoating of enemies and terrorizing of dissidents.

Evolution

1. Self-destruction. One or more of the following may cause decline. The ideocracy may split into 'warring camps'. It may be ended by a military coup, as in Peronist Argentina. There may be a popular rebellion. The economy may stagnate, as demands exceed ability. There may be external attacks by other states which fear the spread of the ideology,
2. Peaceful erosion. A new generation matures which is less fervent and more tolerant of pluralism. Technological developments and artistic expression (for example, the plays of Václav Havel in Czechoslovakia) erode faith in the ideology. The leadership become a less-effective self-serving, careerist elite.
3. Regeneration may prevent or postpone collapse. The ideology is rethought and adapted, or replaced by a completely new set of ideals. For example, in Poland, communist ideocracy failed in 1980, the recognition of Lech Wałęsa's Solidarity Trade Union leading to a military coup and authoritarian military rule. Romanian communism ended abruptly in 1989 and again the military took over, trying and executing Ceaușescu.

== History ==
=== From ancient history to the 20th century ===
Piekalkiewicz and Penn described Pharaonic Egypt, ancient Babylon, the Aztec and Inca empires, Sparta, the Islamic empire, Imperial Russia and Imperial China as ideocracies and cite Tito's Yugoslavia, Peronist Argentina, Iraq under Saddam, the USSR, Salazar's Portugal, Albania, the Warsaw Pact countries, and Imperial Japan as among those that rose and fell in the 20th century. Both Catholic and Protestant extremists in Northern Ireland sought ideocratic solutions, but were thwarted by British troops.

According to Uwe Backes and Steffan Kailitz, the USSR, Italy under Fascism, Nazi Germany and the German Democratic Republic (East Germany) all rose and fell as ideocracies during the 20th century.

The populist form of ideocracy has been an important force in Latin American political history, where many charismatic leaders have emerged since the beginning of the 20th century.

=== 21st century ===
Uwe Backes lists China, North Korea and Cuba as regimes currently showing ideocratic tendencies. Willfried Spohn states that China is an ideocracy. Gordon White said in 1999 China had ceased to be one.

Piekalkiewicz and Penn cited Ba'athist Syria, Iran, North Korea, and Sudan as extant ideocracies. In Israel, only the religious Jewish settlers and ultranationalists seek ideocratic solutions. Peter Bernholz asserts that Saudi Arabia, with its Wahhabist ideology, has been an ideocracy since 1924.

== See also ==
- Political religion
- Power politics
- Power Politics (Wight book)
- State collapse
