= Dragiša Pavlović =

Serbian politician (1943–1996)

- Драгиша Павловић
- Pavlović at the 8th session in September 1987

President of the City Committee of the League of Communists of Belgrade
- In office 23 April 1986 – 29 September 1987
- Preceded by: Slobodan Milošević
- Succeeded by: Slobodanka Gruden (acting); Radoš Smiljković

Member of the Presidency of the Central Committee of the League of Communists of Serbia
- In office 28 May 1986 – 24 September 1987

Personal details
- Born: 5 October 1943 Kragujevac, Nazi-occupied Serbia
- Died: 9 September 1996 (aged 52) Belgrade, Serbia, FR Yugoslavia
- Party: League of Communists of Yugoslavia (1963–1988)
- Education: University of Kragujevac (B.S., B.A.); University of Belgrade (PhD)
- Nickname: Buca

Dragiša "Buca" Pavlović (Serbian Cyrillic: Драгиша "Буца" Павловић; 5 October 1943 – 9 September 1996) was a Serbian politician and academic. He played the key role in opposition to Slobodan Milošević and his rise to power. Pavlović was the president of the City Committee of the League of Communists of Belgrade from 23 April 1986 until his resignation on 29 September 1987.

== Early life and career ==
Dragiša Pavlović was born on 5 October 1943 in Kragujevac, Nazi-occupied Serbia. His mother was a schoolteacher. During youth, he performed arts and earned the nickname "Buca". He became a member of the League of Communists of Yugoslavia (SKJ) in 1963. He initially studied at the Faculty of Mechanical Engineering of the University of Kragujevac, before moving to the Faculty of Economics where he earned his master's degree in 1979. He received his doctorate in 1982 at the Faculty of Political Sciences of the University of Belgrade.

He started his career at a repair company Kompresor, and then worked in the Institute for Planning Systems. He was briefly the director of the newspaper publishing company Svetlost, having been appointed there in January 1973. Pavlović began his academic career at the Faculty of Mechanical Engineering, where he worked as a part-time lecturer on the "Socio-Economic System of SFRY" course. He also worked at the Faculty of Organizational Sciences of the University of Belgrade from 1973 to 1975, and again from 1979 to 1981.

== Political career ==
=== Political beginnings ===
After moving from Kragujevac to Belgrade in the early 1980s, Pavlović entered politics and befriended Ivan Stambolić. He was initially a member of the Presidency of the City Committee of the League of Communists of Belgrade, having been elected to the City Committee on 14 April 1982. During his term, he supported the resignation of Rade Končar from the City Committee and was an active member on economic issues. In 1984, he also became the president of the Belgrade Chamber of Commerce; as president, he worked on reforming the institution. He was re-elected to this position in June 1985.

In March 1986, the City Committee nominated Pavlović to the position of president of the City Committee. He was elected president at the session on 23 April 1986, succeeding Slobodan Milošević. His secretary was Borislav Kuzmanović. A month later, on 28 May 1986, Pavlović was elected member of the Presidency of the Central Committee of the League of Communists of Serbia at the 10th Congress. At the same congress, Milošević was elected as president of the League of Communists of Serbia, as Stambolić's successor. In June, Pavlović was also elected member of the Presidency of the City Committee of the Socialist Alliance of Working People of Belgrade.

During 1986, the City Committee under Pavlović worked on forging closer relations between Belgrade and Kosovo. At a session in June, the City Committee discussed cooperation between Serbian and Kosovar institutions; there, Pavlović expressed his opposition to nationalism and to the emigration of Serbs and Montenegrins from Kosovo. In mid-July, he was part of the Belgrade delegation on economic cooperation between Belgrade and Kosovo. Later that month, he met with Boris Yeltsin, the first secretary of the Moscow City Committee of the Communist Party of the Soviet Union, with whom he discussed strengthening cooperation between Belgrade and Moscow.

Stambolić also sought to tackle the Kosovo issue in 1985 by urging the government to discuss the issue for the first time since 1981. In response to this, the Serbian Academy of Sciences and Arts (SANU) selected a committee of academics to draft a document which became known as SANU Memorandum, after it was leaked by the newspaper Večernje novosti in September 1986. Upon the leak, SKJ, Milošević, and Pavlović, denounced the document for its nationalistic writings. Pavlović considered the policies listed in the document to be in opposition to the policies of SKJ and suggested that they could in return boost the support for non-Serb nationalism and conservatism.

=== 8th session ===
The overall situation in Kosovo, which does not improve with the necessary, desirable, or lightly promised speed, creates a dangerous atmosphere in which it seems where every word spoken against Serbian nationalism is perceived as nationalism. Incendiary words bring nothing but fire.

— Dragiša Pavlović, on 11 September 1987

This was seen as a critique of Milošević and party politics. Milošević denounced Pavlović as being soft on Albanian radicals, contrary to advice from President Ivan Stambolić. On 23–24 September 1987, at the subsequent eighth session of the Central Committee, one that lasted more than 20 hours, and was broadcast live on the state television, Milošević had Pavlović deposed, to the utter embarrassment of Ivan Stambolić; Stambolić was dismissed in December 1987. His dismissal marked the rise of Milošević and his faction inside SKS.

== Later life and final years ==
Pavlović retired from politics after the 8th session and was kicked out of SKJ in 1988. After retiring, he lost his status as a lecturer at the University of Kragujevac and tried to obtain a job in the public sector, but was unsuccessful. He then moved to Slovenia, where he obtained a job, but occasionally came to Serbia to visit his parents and his friend Vidosav Stevanović. He owned a car rental business named Hermes from late 1989.

Pavlović remained a lecturer at the Faculty of Mechanical Engineering until 1990.

Pavlović died on 9 September 1996, aged 52. His funeral was attended by only a few relatives and close friends, among them being Stambolić.

== Legacy ==
Milan Milošević, a Vreme journalist, wrote that Pavlović was "a victim of an attempt to forcibly change the broken system" (žrtva pokušaja da se sistem koji se slomio promeni iznutra) and was one of the first to "warn the danger of the fire that was ignited in those days" (upozorio na opasnost od požara koji je tih dana raspaljen) on Kosovo. He also opined that Pavlović was essentially cold-bloodedly purged at the 8th session.

Pavlović was a social democrat, and anti-nationalist.

Pavlović was a co-author and author of four books in total. His last book, Lightly Promised Speed, is about the 8th session.

== Works ==
- Integracija i tehnologija: prostori i granice [Integration and Technology: Spaces and Boundaries] (in Serbian). 1981. OCLC 40986856.
- Ko radnike povezuje lažnim koncima [Who Connects the Workers With False Strings] (in Serbian). Belgrade: BIGZ. 1984. OCLC 13661873.
- Pitanjem na odgovore [By Questioning the Answers] (in Serbian). Belgrade: BIGZ. 1986. ISBN 978-86-13-00076-1.
- Olako obećana brzina [Lightly Promised Speed] (in Serbian). Zagreb: Globus. 1988. ISBN 978-86-343-0486-2.

== Sources ==
=== Books ===
- Bokovoy, Melissa; Irvine, Jill; Lilly, Carol (1997). State-Society Relations in Yugoslavia, 1945–1992. Palgrave Macmillan. ISBN 978-0-312-12690-2.
- Đokić, Dejan (2003). Yugoslavism: Histories of a Failed Idea, 1918–1992. C. Hurst & Co. ISBN 978-1-85065-663-0.
- Grdešić, Marko (2019). The Shape of Populism: Serbia Before the Dissolution of Yugoslavia. Ann Arbor, Michigan: University of Michigan Press. ISBN 978-0-472-12519-7.
- Jović, Dejan (2009). Yugoslavia: A State That Withered Away. West Lafayette, Indiana: Purdue University Press. ISBN 978-1-55753-495-8. OCLC 225531506.
- Kurspahić, Kemal (2003). Prime Time Crime: Balkan Media in War and Peace. Washington, D.C.: United States Institute of Peace Press. ISBN 978-1-929223-39-8.
- Lampe, John R. (2000). Yugoslavia as History: Twice There Was a Country (2 ed.). Cambridge, United Kingdom: Cambridge University Press. ISBN 978-0-521-77357-7. OCLC 917768569.
- LeBor, Adam (2003). Milosevic: A Biography. London: Bloomsbury. ISBN 978-0-7475-6181-1.
- Thomas, Robert (1998). Serbia Under Milošević: Politics in the 1990s (1 ed.). London: C. Hurst & Co. ISBN 978-1-85065-367-7.

=== Journals ===
- Nikolić, Kosta (2006). "Kako je Slobodan Milošević izabran za vođu srpskih komunista (II)" [How Did Slobodan Milošević Get Elected as the Leader of Serbian Communists (II)]. Istorija 20. veka (in Serbian) (2). ISSN 0352-3160.
- Vladisaljević, Nebojša (2004). "Institutional Power and the Rise of Milošević". Nationalities Papers. 32 (1). doi:10.1080/0090599042000186160. ISSN 0090-5992.

=== News sources ===
- A., M. (16 July 1986). "'Radioton' u Batusu" ["Radioton" in Batus]. Borba (in Serbian). p. 3.
- Dražić, D.; Krsmanović, V.; Radević, D. (15 April 1982). "SK mora da da odgovore na sva savremena pitanja" [LC has to Give Answers to All Contemporary Questions]. Borba (in Serbian). p. 4.
- Dražić, D.; Dubljević, R.; Vignjević, V.; Simonović, V. (24 April 1986). "Jedinstvo temelj sistema" [Unity is the Foundation of the System]. Borba (in Serbian). p. 4.
- Dražić, Dušan; Dubljević, Radmila; Radević, Dragan; Veljković, Vlastimir; Pašić, Slobodan (29 May 1986). "Iz krize bez prečica" [From the Crisis Without Shortcuts]. Borba (in Serbian). p. 4.
- Hall, Richard Andrew (28 May 2003). "East European Perspectives: May 28, 2003". Radio Free Europe/Radio Liberty.
- J., S. (19 January 1973). "Novi rukovodioci kragujevačke "Svetlosti"" [New Managers of Kragujevac-Based "Svetlost"]. Borba (in Serbian). p. 14.
- Malešević, M. (28 June 1985). "Napori veći od rezultata" [Efforts Greater than Results]. Borba (in Serbian). p. 5.
- Mihovilović, Maroje (2 April 2003). "Milošević's Greatest Betrayal: How Milošević Killed His Best Friend". Nacional. Archived from the original on 10 August 2023.
- Milošević, Milan (12 September 2018). "1987 – Trenutak istine Dragiše Pavlovića" [1987 – Dragiša Pavlović's Moment of Truth]. Vreme (in Serbian). Archived from the original on 5 November 2022.
- Milošević, Milan (14 September 1996). "Dragiša Pavlović (1943–1996)". Vreme (in Serbian). No. 308.
- Radević, D. (21 September 1982). "Gubitke na videlo" [Losses Exposed]. Borba (in Serbian). p. 5.
- Radević, D. (28 March 1986). "Rad osnovno merilo" [Work is the Basic Measure]. Borba (in Serbian). p. 3.
- Radević, D. (16 October 1986). "Odbačen sporni 'Memorandum'" [Rejected Controversial "Memorandum"]. Borba (in Serbian). p. 3.
- Radević, D.; Simonović, V. (10 September 1985). "Sredstvo a ne cilj" [A Means, Not a Goal]. Borba (in Serbian). p. 3.
- Radević, D.; Simonović, V. (20 June 1986). "Akcija umesto zaključka" [Action Instead of Conclusion]. Borba (in Serbian). p. 3.
- Stevanović, Vidosav (18 August 2010). "Svedočanstva o sramnom vremenu" [Shameful Time Testimonies]. Vreme (in Serbian).
- Torov, M. (27 August 1984). "Odlučnost na proveri" [Determination on the Test]. Borba (in Serbian). p. 3.
- Torov, I.; Radević, D. (23 September 1982). "Prihvaćena ostavka Rade Končara" [Rade Končar's Resignation is Accepted]. Borba (in Serbian). p. 3.
- V., M. (1 July 1986). "Novo predsedništvo GK SSRN" [New Presidency of the CC of SSRN]. Borba (in Serbian). p. 7.
- "Udruženje osnova dogovora" [Uniting on the Basis of the Agreement]. Borba (in Serbian). 30 August 1984. p. 11.
- "Razgovori o saradnji" [Discussion about cooperation]. Borba (in Serbian). 30 July 1986. p. 10.
