= Marko Đuričin =

Serbian communist politician and political activist

President of the League of Communists of Vojvodina
- In office April 28, 1982 – April 28, 1983
- Preceded by: Boško Krunić (as Secretary)
- Succeeded by: Slavko Veselinov

Personal details
- Born: 1925 Novi Bečej, Kingdom of Serbs, Croats, and Slovenes
- Died: 2013 (aged 87–88) Serbia
- Party: League of Communists of Yugoslavia (SKJ)

Marko Đuričin (1925–2013) was a Serbian communist politician and political activist of SFR Yugoslavia. He served as Chairman of the Vojvodina Council of Trade Unions from 1974 to 1978, and as a member of the Presidium of the League of Communists of Vojvodina from 1978. From 1982 to 1983 he served as President of the League of Communists of Vojvodina, succeeding Slavko Veselinov. He died in 2013.
