= Renata Ulmanski =

Serbian actress

- Рената Улмански
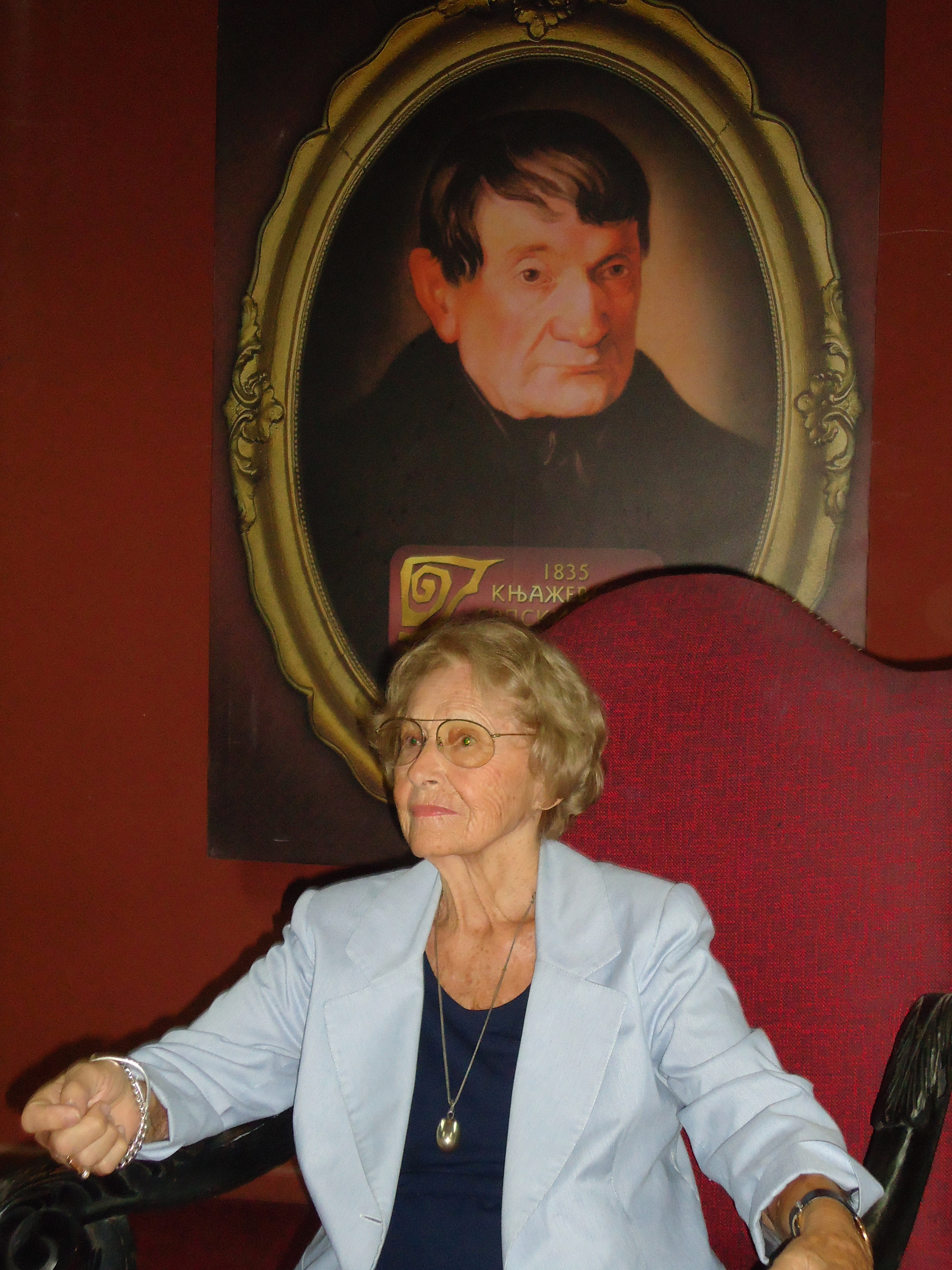
- Renata Ulmanski
- Born: 29 November 1929 (age 96); Zagreb, Kingdom of Yugoslavia
- Occupation: Actress
- Years active: 1955–present
- Spouse: Mirko Tepavac

Renata Ulmanski (Serbian Cyrillic: Рената Улмански: born 29 November 1929) is a Serbian actress. She appeared in more than ninety films since 1955. Ulmanski was married to Serbian politician and writer Mirko Tepavac (1922–2014).

== Selected filmography ==
Year	Title	Role	Notes
1957	Priests Ćira and Spira		
1975	Backbone		
1976	The Farm in the Small Marsh		
1982	Nešto između		
2003	The Professional		
2004	Goose Feather		
2006	Tomorrow Morning		
2012	Night Boats		
