= Hannah Arendt Institute for Totalitarianism Studies =

German research institute

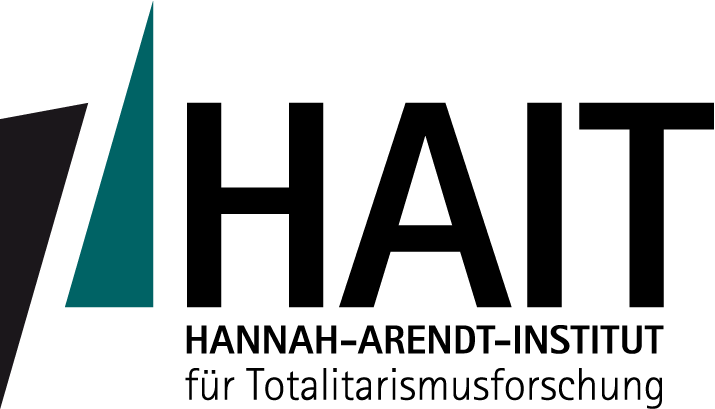
- Logo of the Hannah Arendt Institute for Totalitarianism Studies
- Abbreviation: HAIT
- Named after: Hannah Arendt
- Established: June 17, 1993
- Type: Research institute
- Purpose: Basic research in contemporary history and comparative politics
- Location: Dresden, Germany
- Coordinates: 51.02955°N 13.72430°E
- Director: Jörg Ganzenmüller
- Publication: Totalitarianism and Democracy
- Affiliations: Dresden University of Technology
- Staff: c. 50 (incl. assistants and fellows)
- Website: hait.tu-dresden.de

The Hannah Arendt Institute for Totalitarianism Studies (German: Hannah-Arendt-Institut für Totalitarismusforschung, abbreviated HAIT) is a state-funded independent research institute affiliated with Dresden University of Technology and devoted to the comparative analysis of dictatorships. The institute focusses particularly on the structures of Nazism and Communism as well as on the presuppositions and consequences of the two ideological dictatorships. The institute is named after the German-American philosopher and political scientist Hannah Arendt, whose magnum opus The Origins of Totalitarianism (1951) is considered across disciplines as one of the most influential works of the 20th century and continues to shape in particular scholarly discussions of totalitarian systems of political domination.

The initiative for establishing the HAIT originated in the nearly 60-year, double dictatorship experience of Eastern Germany and in the Enlightenment-driven Peaceful Revolution of 1989/90, and goes back to former civil rights activists who, as members of the Saxon State Parliament, brought about an Act of Parliament setting up the institute in November 1991. The institute began operation on June 17, 1993, under the direction of the historian of Eastern Europe Alexander Fischer.

== Research profile ==
In keeping with the entirety of Hannah Arendt's work, research activities of the institute named after her – the HAIT – focus on the comparative analysis of dictatorships while also reflecting on the historical and political conditions of liberal-democratic polities. In accordance with the institute's statutes, the systematic study of political, social and cultural developments during the Nazi and SED dictatorships lies at the heart of its work.

Particular attention is devoted to the analysis of opposition and resistance to these two German dictatorships of the 20th century. In addition, international as well as intertemporal comparative perspectives on autocratic regimes belong to the research programme, as does analysis of the political, economic and social transformations in the post-Communist countries after 1989. The institute also devotes research to current challenges and dangers faced by democracy, in particular from autocratic and fundamentalist regimes as well as extremist, racist and anti-Semitic attitudes and movements.

Therefore, HAIT considers itself a point of intersection between regional, national and transnational spheres of experience of the Political in a time of necessary redefinition of liberal-democratic societal models. In line with these perspectives, work at the HAIT currently breaks down into three areas of research and one cross-sectional assignment:

- Research on dictatorships and autocracies in the 20th Century and their study (dictatorship research)
- Transformation research from an internationally comparative perspective (transformation research)
- Comparative research into extremism and autocracies (extremism research)
- Cross-sectional assignment: Conceptual and intellectual-historical foundations

A central part of activities at the HAIT lies in conveying, in accordance with the institute's statutes, its own research results to the general public. In keeping with this endeavour, continual collaboration occurs with various memorial sites, organisations supporting historical and political education, teacher training institutions, schools and players from civil society, who regularly avail themselves of the institute's range of services in consulting, continuing education and lectures.

== Publications ==
In the classical print media segment, the range of publications from the HAIT comprises an academic journal as well as four academic book series, in part published in collaboration with co-operation partners. In March 2020 HAIT has started curating his own science blog Denken ohne Geländer [″Thinking Without a Banister″],. In addition, the institute makes available several databases focussing on contemporary history to the academic research community.

=== Journal ===
- The institute's journal, Totalitarianism and Democracy, has been published twice a year since 2004 at Vandenhoeck & Ruprecht and provides an interdisciplinary platform for comparative research on non-democratic systems and movements in history and the present, and for analysis of the preconditions of liberal-democratic societies. Since 2020 it is published also in an open access version.

=== Book series ===
- The series Schriften des Hannah-Arendt-Instituts [″Writings from the Hannah Arendt Institute″] has appeared since 1995 – originally at Böhlau Verlag, and since 2004 at Vandenhoeck & Ruprecht – and serves the publication of comprehensive research results in the history of Nazism, Communism and the transformation after 1989, as well as research on the manifestations of political extremism throughout history and in the present day. The 69 volumes published to date (status: January 2026) comprise both monographs and conference documentation.
- The series Berichte und Studien [″Reports and Studies″] appearing since 1995 – originally published by the institute, and starting in 2004 by V&R unipress – contains studies of narrower scope tied to the institute's programme and devoted to German and (Eastern) European regional history and political extremism in Saxony. The series currently comprises 88 monographs and anthologies (status: January 2026).
- The series Wege der Totalitarismusforschung [″Pathways of Totalitarianism Research″] has been published since 2009 by Vandenhoeck & Ruprecht and disseminates foundational works in totalitarianism studies which, either out of print or forgotten, have in part also remained neglected. The six volumes published so far (status: January 2026) are devoted to pertinent work by Richard Löwenthal, Jacob Talmon, Aleksander Hertz, Aurel Kolnai, Luigi Sturzo and Carl Joachim Friedrich together wirth Henry Kissinger.
- The series Lebenszeugnisse – Leidenswege [″Testimonies – Ordeals″], published by the institute itself since 1996 in co-operation with the Saxon Memorial Foundation and conceived for political education, presents (auto)biographical reports of victims of political tyranny. The series comprises 26 volumes to date (status: December 2020).

=== Databases ===
- The database on the Saxon NSDAP daily newspaper Der Freiheitskampf, under development at the HAIT since 2009 allows open access searching of data and events pertaining to the regional history of National Socialism in the newspaper collection comprising around 66,000 pages. Subject and person indexing is based on the Integrated Authority File and place identification based on the Index of Places in Saxony. So far the period of 1930 through 1938 has been released (status: December 2025), with further years through 1945 to become successively available following processing.
- The database for Film Censorship in East and West, work on which began at the institute in 2016 in co-operation with the DEFA Foundation, contains standardized information on all approximately 630 East German films from DEFA and Deutscher Fernsehfunk examined between 1954 and 1966 by the Interministerial Committee on East-West Film Issues by order of the (West) German Federal Government. The freely accessible online search tool offers, among other things, access to the individual investigatory decisions along with argumentation.
- The databases on Judgements of the Soviet Military Tribunals, developed at the HAIT as part of a research project supported as of 1998 by the Federal Ministry of the Interior and by the German-Russian Historians' Commission, are based on both Russian and German sources pertaining to the altogether over 55,000 recorded proceedings against German civilians and members of the military. The standardised information on SMT activities comprises, among other things, names of the persons concerned, grounds for judgements, sentences and release dates, and if necessary can be individually requested or even researched at a workstation in the institute library.
- Earlier research projects on the Peaceful Revolution in Saxony led at the institute to the creation of a database containing around 1,400 files, each with multiple scanned archived documents and documenting, in chronological order, the 1989–90 political developments of all groups of the population in the former GDR districts Dresden, Leipzig and Karl-Marx-Stadt. Access is available locally on request at a workstation of the institute library.

== Institute library ==
The HAIT maintains its own special library, with currently around 53,800 volumes (status: January 2024) available to both the academic community and the general public for use on site. The collection areas are largely geared to the institute's research specialisations. Priority is accordingly given to literature on the history of National Socialism, the history of the Soviet Occupation Zone/GDR, the history of the transformation after 1989 and on dictatorships and political extremism in Europe. Comprehensive holdings of around 550 pertinent journals and newspapers are also available.

== Evaluation ==
In March 2019 an expert committee appointed by the German Council of Science and Humanities and headed by Caspar Hirschi conducted an evaluation that found the institute to be an ″important driving force for research in contemporary history and political science″ that has made ″valuable and indispensable contributions to both academic support of the remembrance of victims of the Nazi dictatorship and the SED regime and of political education in Saxony in general″.

== Committees and people ==
The HAIT has the legal form of a registered association, with juridical persons governed by private or public law – such as the Free State of Saxony, represented by the Saxon State Ministry for Science, Culture and Tourism – serving as members with voting power.

=== Directorate ===
Currently

- Uwe Backes – Deputy Director (since 1999), acting Director (2024–2025)
- Jörg Ganzenmüller – Director (since 2025)

Formerly

- Gerhard Besier – Director (2003–2008)
- Alexander Fischer – Director (1993–1995)
- Klaus-Dietmar Henke – Director (1997–2002)
- Günther Heydemann – Director (2009–2016)
- Thomas Lindenberger – Director (2019–2025)
- Heinrich Oberreuter – Acting Director (2002–2003)
- Martin Onnasch – Deputy Director (1994–1997), acting Director (1995–1997)
