= Mirko Čanadanović =

Yugoslav Communist politician

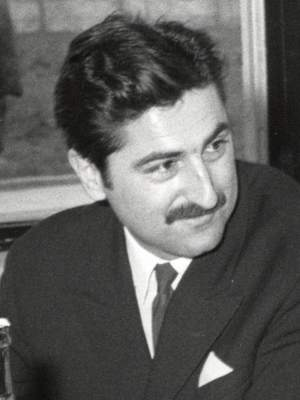

President of the Presidency of the Provincial Committee of the League of Communists of Vojvodina
- In office 1969 – 24 December 1972
- Preceded by: Mirko Tepavac
- Succeeded by: Dušan Alimpić

Personal details
- Born: 1936 (age 89–90) Vojvoda Stepa, Danube Banovina, Kingdom of Yugoslavia
- Party: League of Communists of Yugoslavia (SKJ)
- Profession: Linguist

Mirko Čanadanović (born 1936) is a Serbian and Yugoslav communist politician from Vojvodina who served as President of the Presidency of the Provincial Committee of the League of Communists of Vojvodina from 1969 to 1972. After the failure of liberalization he, along with many of his colleagues, were forced to resign and disappeared in the political realm. Following his departure he was a proofreader at the NIP "Dnevnik".

== Personal life ==
Čanadanović was born in 1936 to a family that came from Hungary after World War I, with his last name coming from Čanad near the Maros river.

Political offices
Preceded by Mirko Tepavac	Chairman of the Presidium of League of Communists of Yugoslavia; 1969–1972	Succeeded by Dušan Alimpić
