= Margaret Moore (academic) =

Canadian political theorist

- Occupations: Political theorist, scholar and academic
- Awards: Fellow, Royal Society of Canada

Academic background
- Education: B.A., Political Science; M.A., Political Science; Ph.D., Economics and Political Science
- Alma mater: Western University; London School of Economics

Academic work
- Institutions: Queen's University at Kingston

Margaret Moore is a Canadian political theorist. She is a Professor of Political Studies and Philosophy at Queen's University at Kingston.

Moore has written on territorial and global distributive justice, just war theory, historical injustice, nationalism, multiculturalism, immigration, and place-related interests. Moore has authored four books including Foundations of Liberalism, The Ethics of Nationalism, A Political Theory of Territory, and Who Should Own Natural Resources?.

She is a fellow of the Royal Society of Canada.

== Education and career ==
After receiving her doctoral degree from London School of Economics and Political Science in 1990, Moore returned to Canada, where she taught at York University from 1990 till 1993 before being appointed by University of Waterloo as an assistant professor at Department of Political Science. In 1997, she was promoted to associate professor. In 2002, Moore left University of Waterloo and was recruited by Queen’s University as Queen’s National Scholar in Political Theory and Associate Professor of Political Science. She received professorship in 2005. During her term at Queen’s University, Moore was appointed as Sir Edward Peacock Professor in Political Theory from 2008 till 2013.

== Research ==
Moore specializes in political theory, political philosophy and territorial rights.

=== Nationalism, multiculturalism and liberalism ===
Moore has conducted research on the ethics of secession and discussed the just cause theory, choice theory, and national self-determination theories of secession in the context of nationalist arguments and mobilization. In the early 2000s, she studied the relationship between international law and the minority national communities' aspirations for collective self-government. She suggested the development of a principled response to the possible challenges to the international legal rules by minority nationalists.

=== Self-determination ===
Moore researched on the concept of self-determination, compared the territorial and national concept of self-determination and highlighted major criticism regarding principle of national self-determination. Through her research, she highlighted two aspects of right of self-determination and discussed internal and collective self-determination. She later examined the relationship among territory, boundaries, and self-determination. Moore especially focused on the relationship between functional justifications for state territory and state borders, and self-determination.

=== Territorial rights and distributive justice ===
Moore has conducted extensive research on natural resources, territorial right, and global distributive justice. She discussed the cosmopolitan theories of global justice and presented arguments for the generation of right over resources through self-determination.

Moore’s book The Ethics of Nationalism was published in 2001 and is based on political philosophy of nationalism. Ronald Beiner from University of Toronto reviewed that the book "moves helpfully back and forth between normative arguments and empirical analyses" and that the reader gets "clearly written and intelligent accounts of debates" regarding nationalism, multiculturalism and citizenship.

Moore published A Political Theory of Territory in 2015. The book revolves around philosophical analysis of territory, which is under-theorized in political theory focusing on the relationship between the state and citizens. According to Tamar Meisels from Tel-Aviv University, "No other philosophical volume thus far has supplied an answer as complete and all-encompassing as the account of territorial justice delivered in this impressive book". Jonathan Kwan stated the book offers "an innovative, systematic, and tightly argued theory of territory rooted in the moral value of self‐determination." He stated Moore's treatise on territory as an "important and valuable work that meets a pressing need in politics and political philosophy today." Ignas Kalpokas from Vytautas Magnus University called the book "a welcome innovation" and a "well-written and relatively accessible book that traverses disciplinary boundaries."

== Awards and honors ==
- Doctoral Award, Social Science and Humanities Research Council of Canada
- 2017 - Book Prize for A Political Theory of Territory, Canadian Philosophical Association
- 2018 - Honorary Fellow and Academic Visitor, Australian National University
- 2018 - Olof Palme Research Professorship, University of Stockholm
- 2019 - Prize for Excellence in Research, Queen’s University
- 2019 - Fellow, Royal Society of Canada
- 2019 - Magnet Scholar at Institute of Human Rights, University of Connecticut

== Books ==
- Foundations of Liberalism (1993) ISBN 9780198273851
- The Ethics of Nationalism (2001) ISBN 9780198297468
- A Political Theory of Territory (2015) ISBN 9780190222246
- Who Should Own Natural Resources? (2019) ISBN 9781509529162
