= Circon Verlag =

German publishing house

- Formerly: Compact Verlag (until 2018)
- Industry: Publishing house
- Founded: 1976; 49 years ago
- Founder: Friedrich Niendieck
- Headquarters: Munich, Germany
- Key people: Alexander Herbert, Ralf Meier
- Owner: Vermar
- Website: www.circonverlag.de

Circon Verlag is a German publishing house, based in Munich. It was founded as Compact Verlag in 1976 by the publisher Friedrich Niendieck. In October 2008, Niendieck announced the sale of its publishing group to the publishing company European Professional Publishing Group (EPPG). Since September 2014, Compact Verlag belongs to Vermar, which has its headquarters in Berlin. Compact publishes about 1,000 books and electronic products. In addition, licenses have been issued in over 35 countries.

In 2018, the name was changed to Circon Verlag after repeated misidentifications with the far-right Compact magazine.

== Publishing program ==
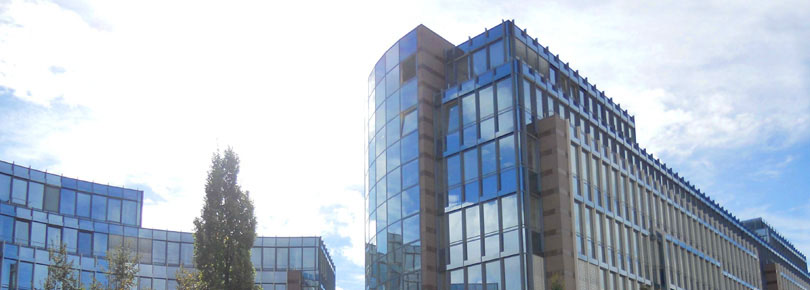
Compact Verlag Office

One focus of the publishing house is in "Lernen und Weiterbildung" (Learning and Training) and includes learning lectures, learning aids, language courses, dictionaries and reference books. Another book series is the Compact LernKrimi that facilitate a didactic approach to learning languages and started in the autumn of 2002. Their range includes more than 150 titles in English, French, Italian, Spanish, Dutch, Swedish and German as a foreign language.

Titles in the areas of "Beratung" (Counseling), "Wissen & Bildung" (Knowledge & Education), "Kochen & Genießen" (Cooking & Relish)", "Gesundheit & Fitness" (Health & Fitness) and "Kreativ in Haus & Garten" (Creative within Home & Garden) are published by the imprint "compact via".

The book series compact kids covers the areas of "Kinderwissen" (Children's knowledge), "Tiere & Natur" (Animals & Nature), "Kinderbeschäftigung" (Children's Entertainment), "Wimmelbücher" (Search and find books), "Grundschule & Vorschule" (Primary School & Preschool) and "Freunde- und Malbücher" (Friends and Coloring Books).
