= Susan L. Woodward =

American political scientist

Susan Lampland Woodward has been a professor at the Political Science Program at The Graduate Center of the City University of New York (CUNY) since 2001. She is an expert on Balkan, East European, and post-Soviet affairs, on intervention in civil wars, and on postconflict reconstruction. She is the author of two books, Balkan Tragedy: Chaos and Dissolution after the Cold War (Brookings Institution Press, 1995), and Socialist Unemployment: The Political Economy of Yugoslavia (Princeton Univ. Press, 1995), about which the reviewer in Foreign Affairs wrote, "Woodward's argument is big and bold, challenging almost every major interpretation, from capitalist assumptions misapplied in a reform socialist context by outside analysis, to explanations of the sources of Yugoslavia's particular dilemmas and failures, to the meaning of Tito's death in the ungluing of the country. It is intellectual discourse at a high level."

Previously she was a senior research fellow at the Centre for Defence Studies at King's College, University of London, and a senior fellow at the Brookings Institution (1990–99). During her time in Washington DC she taught graduate seminars at Georgetown, George Washington, and Johns Hopkins School for Advanced International Studies. She also taught in Yale University (1982–89), Williams College (1978–82), Mount Holyoke College (1977–78), and Northwestern University (1972–77).

In 1994, she worked for the Special Representative of the United Nations Secretary General for UNPROFOR, and in 1998 she was a special advisor to the Organization for Security and Co-operation in Europe Mission to Bosnia and Herzegovina. Eisenhower Fellowships selected Susan Woodward as a USA Eisenhower Fellow in 1998.

She received a PhD in politics from Princeton University in 1975 after completing a doctoral dissertation titled "Training for self-management patterns of authority in Yugoslav secondary schools." She received her bachelor's degree from the University of Minnesota.

Susan L. Woodward and economist Susan E. Woodward shared an apartment for several months and styled themselves the "Susans Woodward".

== Publications ==
- Susan L. Woodward, "The Ideology of Failed States." Cambridge University Press (2017).
- Susan L. Woodward, "Socialist Unemployment: The Political Economy of Yugoslavia, 1945–1990," Princeton, New Jersey: Princeton University Press (1995).
- Susan L. Woodward, “Balkan Tragedy: Chaos and Dissolution after the Cold War," Washington: The Brookings Institution (1995).
- Susan L. Woodward and Stefano Bianchini, eds., “From the Adriatic to the Caucasus: Viable Dynamics of Stabilization," Ravenna: Longo Editore (2003).
- Susan L. Woodward, “Do the Root Causes of Civil War Matter? On Using Knowledge to Improve Peacebuilding Interventions” Journal of Intervention and State-Building volume 1, no. 2 (spring 2007)
- Susan L. Woodward, Astri Suhrke and Espen Villanger; “Economic Aid to Post-Conflict Countries: A Methodological Critique of Collier and Hoeffler,” Conflict, Security, and Development, vol. 5, no. 3 (December 2005).
- Susan L. Woodward, “Kosovo and the Region: Consequences of the Waiting Game,” in Jeffrey Laurenti, ed., Options for Kosovo’s Final Status (New York: United Nations Association of the United States, January 2000);
- Susan L. Woodward, and Benn Steil; "A European ‘New Deal’ for the Balkans," 78 Foreign Affairs 95–105 (November–December 1999).
- Susan L. Woodward, "Reforming the Socialist State: Ideology and Public Finance in Yugoslavia,” 41 World Politics 267–305 (January 1989).
- Susan L. Woodward “Orthodoxy and Solidarity: Competing Claims and International Adjustment in Yugoslavia,” 40 International Organization 505–545 (Spring 1986).
- Susan L. Woodward, “‘The Freedom of the People is in its Private Life’: The Unrevolutionary Implications of Industrial Democracy,” 20 American Behavioral Scientist 579–596 (March–April 1977).
- Susan L. Woodward, “From Revolution to Post-Revolution: How Much Do We Really Know about Yugoslav Politics?” 30 World Politics 141–166 (October 1977).
