= Uwe Backes =

German political scientist (born 1960)

Uwe Backes (born 2 February 1960 in Greimerath) is a German political scientist and specialist in political extremism. He is a professor at the Technical University Dresden and together with Eckhard Jesse the editor of the Yearbook on Extremism and Democracy and Series on Extremism and Democracy. Backes is an adherent of the classical German theory of extremism (Extremismustheorie) that postulates that the extreme right and the extreme left have much in common in their opposition to liberty and democracy.
