= Đorđe Stojšić (Serbian politician, born 1928) =

Serbian politician

Đorđe Stojšić (Serbian Cyrillic: Ђорђе Стојшић; 28 May 1928 – 7 August 2014) was a politician in Serbia and a prominent political figure in the Socialist Autonomous Province of Vojvodina.

== Early life and wartime activities ==
Stojšić was born in Jarak, a village in Sremska Mitrovica in what was then Syrmia Oblast in the Kingdom of Serbs, Croats and Slovenes. In July 1943, at age fifteen, he joined the Fourth Military District Brigade of the 16th Vojvodina Division of the Yugoslav Partisans and fought against German Nazi occupation forces and their allies during the Axis occupation of Serbia.

== Political career ==
Stojšić was the president of the Assembly of Vojvodina from 1982 to 1983 and subsequently served as President of the Presidency of the League of Communists of Vojvodina from 1985 to 1988. By virtue of holding the latter position, he automatically served on the Central Committee of the League of Communists of Yugoslavia and the Central Committee of the League of Communists of Serbia. He was also a delegate in the National Assembly of Serbia and a member of its agriculture committee, and was involved in the political life of Sremska Mitrovica for more than forty years, serving for a time as president of its municipal assembly.

Stojšić was an opponent of Serbian nationalism. His political career came to an end due to a conflict with Slobodan Milošević in 1988, at a time when Milošević was secretary of the League of Communists of Serbia and still consolidating his control over the political institutions of Serbia and Yugoslavia. When Milošević threatened to remove the autonomous status of Vojvodina and Kosovo, Stojšić responded by urging Milošević's removal from office. He was quoted as saying, "if he isn't stopped ... who knows which way we would be heading and where it would all lead us." He also said, "At first I did not take Milošević or his unrealistic personal ambitions seriously [...] But now I see that his mistakes could have disastrous effects." He added that Milošević had used undemocratic means to remove his enemies from the Central Committee of the Serbian party and that a climate of fear had descended over the body.

Stojšić resigned from office on 6 October 1988 amidst the backdrop of the "Yoghurt Revolution," a supposed anti-bureaucratic revolution in Vojvodina orchestrated by Milošević and his supporters. Milošević's allies subsequently took over the leadership of the Vojvodina party. Stojšić was a consistent opponent of Milošević's policies in the Yugoslav Wars of the 1990s.

He died on 7 August 2014, at the age of 86.

== See also ==
- Politics of Serbia
