= Boško Krunić =

Yugoslav Communist politician

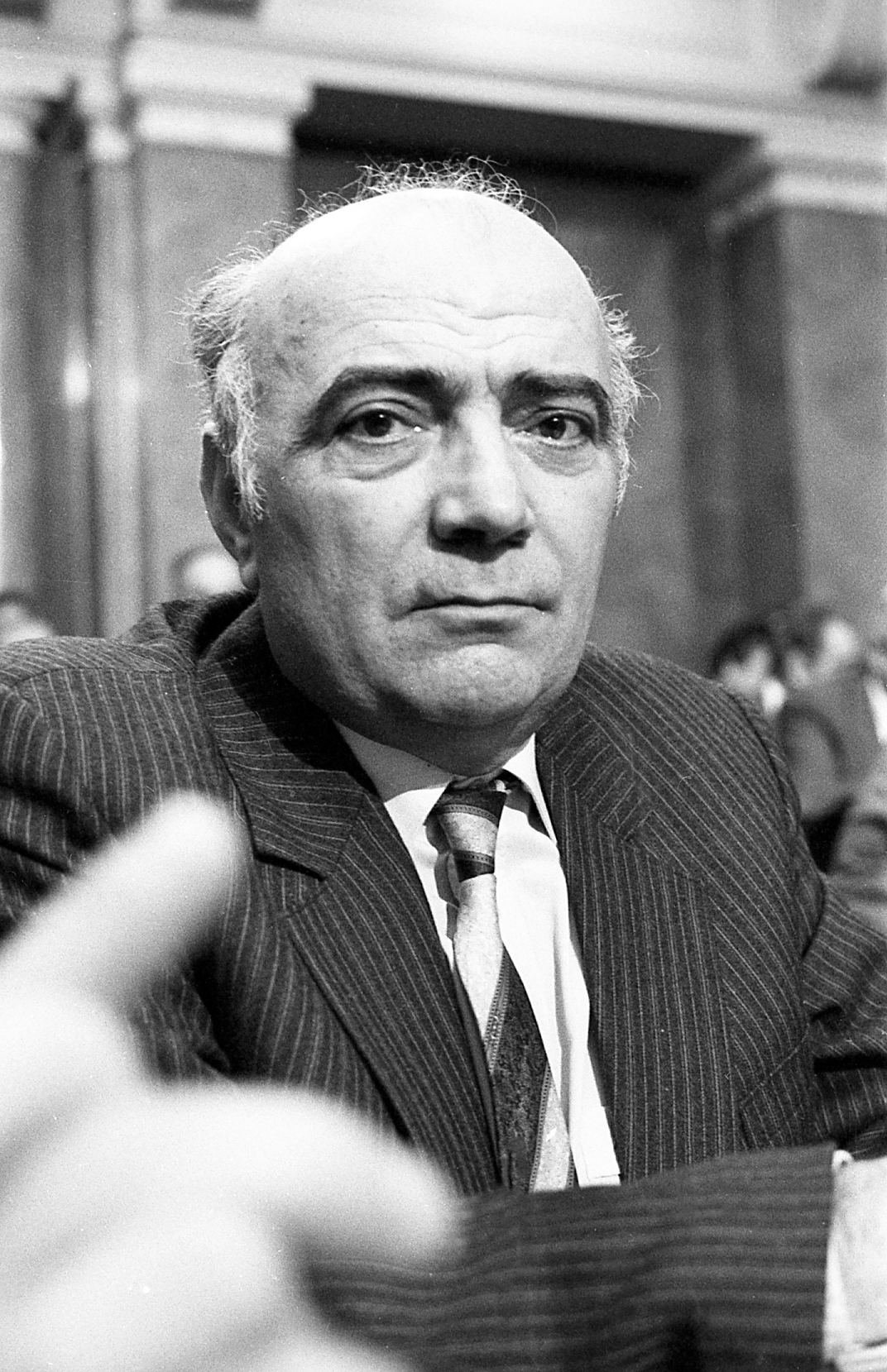

President of the Presidency of the LCY Central Committee
- In office 28 June 1987 – 30 June 1988
- Preceded by: Milanko Renovica
- Succeeded by: Stipe Šuvar

President of the Presidency of the Provincial Committee of the League of Communists of Vojvodina
- In office 28 April 1984 – 28 April 1985
- Preceded by: Slavko Veselinov
- Succeeded by: Đorđe Stojšić
- In office 28 April 1981 – 28 April 1982
- Preceded by: Dušan Alimpić
- Succeeded by: Marko Đuričin

Personal details
- Born: 21 October 1929 Prhovo, Danube Banovina, Kingdom of Yugoslavia
- Died: 23 January 2017 (aged 87) Novi Sad, Serbia
- Party: League of Communists of Yugoslavia (SKJ)

Boško Krunić (21 October 1929 – 23 January 2017) was a Yugoslav Communist politician. He was a chairman of the Presidency of the League of Communists of Yugoslavia for one year between 1987 and 1988, and previously served as Secretary of the Provincial Committee of the League of Communists of Vojvodina from 1981 to 1982, and again from 1984 to 1985 as President of the Presidency. Krunić died on 23 January 2017 at the age of 87.

== Anti-bureaucratic revolution ==
Krunić resigned from the League of Communists of Vojvodina in 1988, pressured by the Anti-bureaucratic revolution, which in Vojvodina had been led by Mihalj Kertes.

Political offices
Preceded by Milanko Renovica	President of the Presidency of League of Communists of Yugoslavia; 1987–1988	Succeeded by Stipe Šuvar
