= Mirko Tepavac =

Yugoslav diplomat

Mirko Tepavac GBE
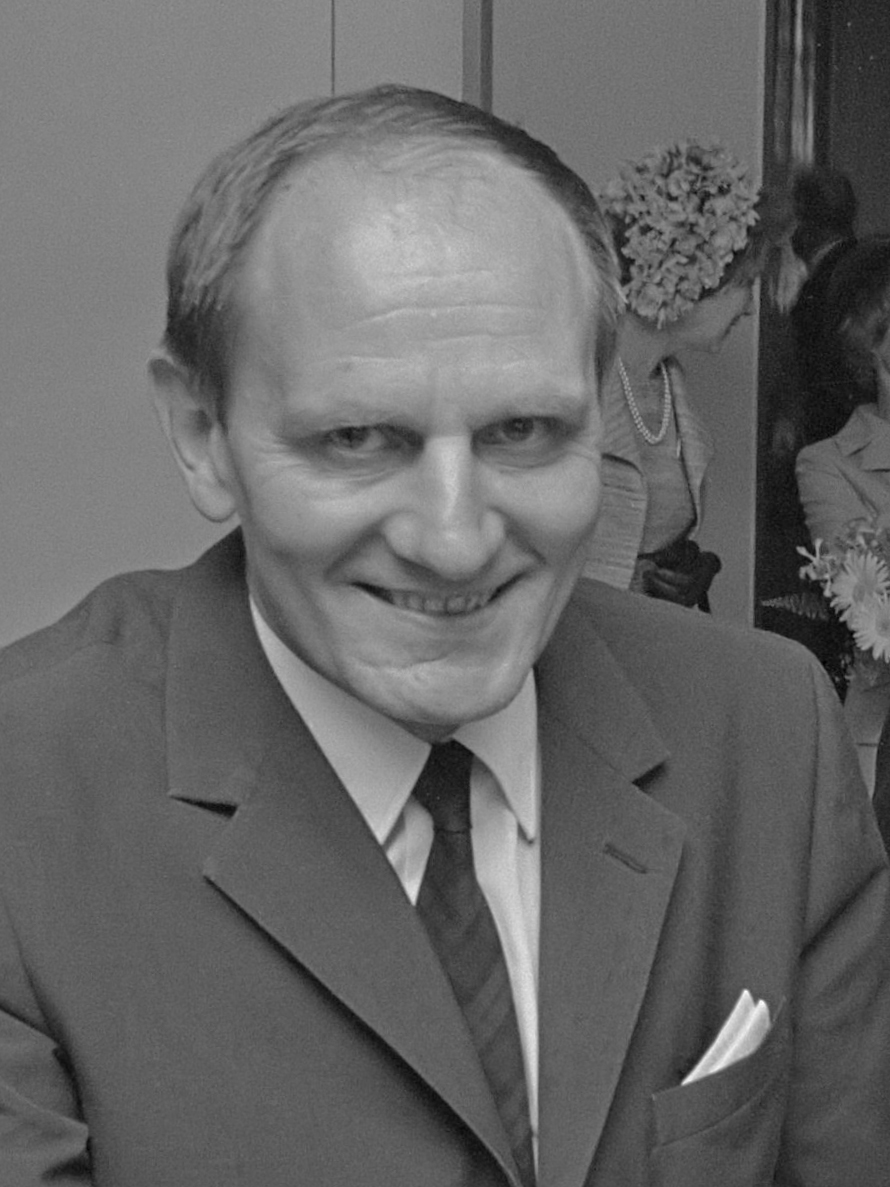
- Tepavac in 1970.

Minister of Foreign Affairs of the SFR Yugoslavia
- In office 25 April 1969 – 1 November 1972
- President: Josip Broz Tito
- Prime Minister: Mika Špiljak; Mitja Ribičič; Džemal Bijedić
- Preceded by: Marko Nikezić
- Succeeded by: Miloš Minić

Personal details
- Born: 13 August 1922 Zemun, Kingdom of Serbs, Croats and Slovenes
- Died: 28 August 2014 (aged 92) Belgrade, Serbia
- Resting place: Belgrade New Cemetery
- Party: League of Communists of Yugoslavia
- Spouse: Renata Ulmanski
- Awards

Mirko Tepavac (Serbian Cyrillic: Мирко Тепавац; 13 August 1922 – 28 August 2014) was a Yugoslav and Serbian politician and communist activist who was the Minister of Foreign Affairs of the SFR Yugoslavia.

He was also President of the Provincial Committee of the Union of Communists of Vojvodina, from 1965 until 1967. He was the husband of actress Renata Ulmanski. He died on 28 August 2014, in Belgrade and was buried at the Zemun Cemetery
