= Presidency of the League of Communists of Yugoslavia =

Political-executive organ of the League of Communists of Yugoslavia

Presidency of the Central Committee of the League of Communists of Yugoslavia

Overview
- Type: Political-executive organ of the Central Committee of the LCY.
- Elected by: Session of the Central Committee.
- Length of term: Varied from 4 to 6 years
- Term limits: Two terms; in exceptional circumstances, a third term could be obtained
- Age limit: None

History
- Established: by 1st Central Council on 23 April 1919; 106 years ago
- Disbanded: by 14th Congress on 26 May 1990; 35 years ago
- First convocation: 23 April 1919
- Last convocation: 15 May 1990

Leadership
- Leader office: President
- Administrative leader: Secretary
- Administrative deputies: Executive Secretaries

Meeting place
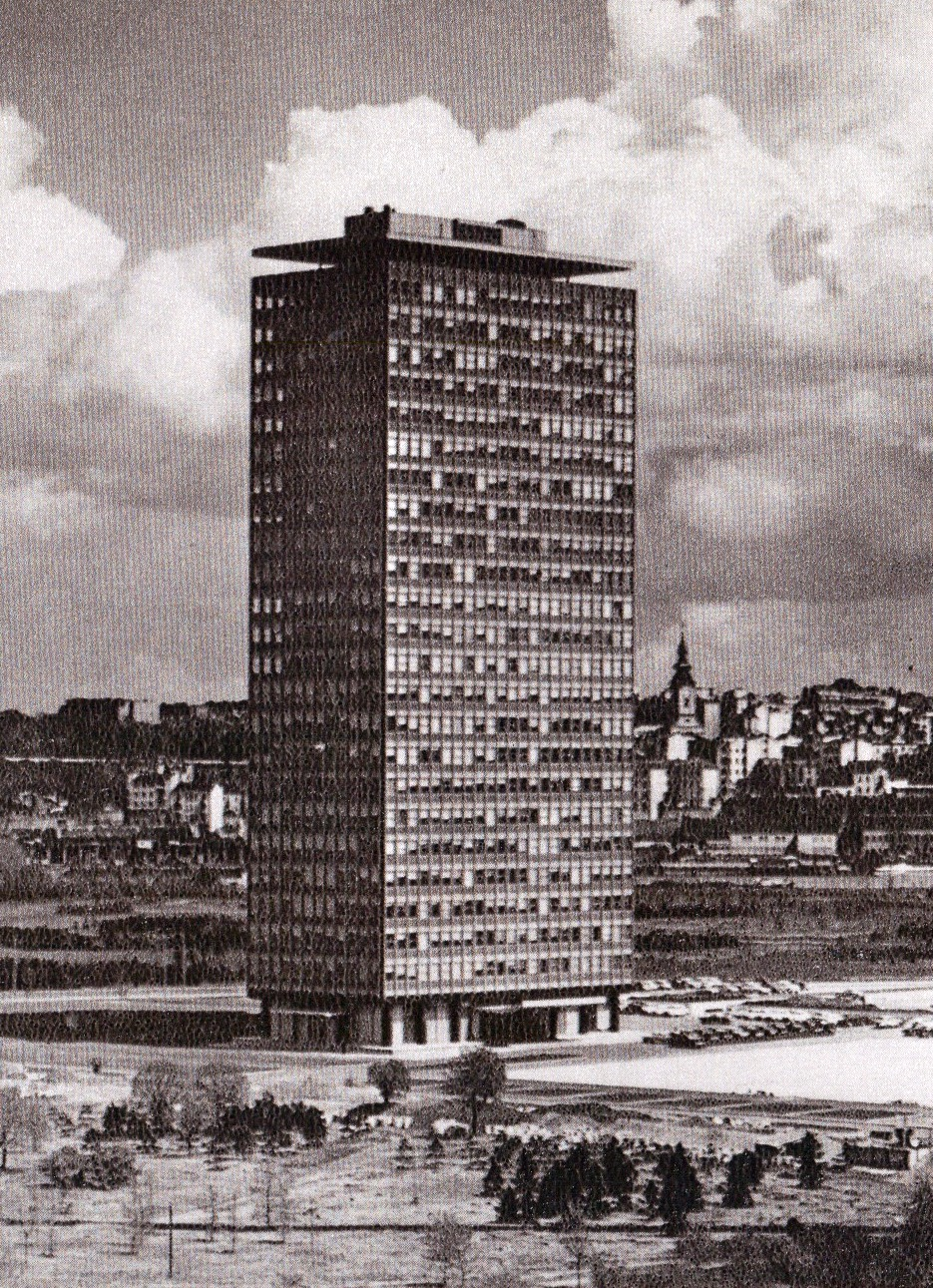
- Palace of Socio-Political Organisations; Belgrade, Socialist Republic of Serbia, Socialist Federal Republic of Yugoslavia

Statute
- "Statute of the League of Communists of Yugoslavia"

Rules
- 1978–1990: "Rules of Procedure on the Organisation and Working Method of the Presidency of the League of Communists of Yugoslavia"; 1969–1978: "Rules of Procedure on the Organisation and Activity of the Presidency of the League of Communists of Yugoslavia"

The Presidency of the Central Committee of the League of Communists of Yugoslavia (LCY) functioned as the political-executive organ of the party and the Socialist Federal Republic of Yugoslavia when the party congress and the Central Committee were adjourned. (Note: An exception to this rule occurred at the 9th LCY Congress in 1969, when the Central Committee was replaced with the Conference, which lasted until the 10th LCY Congress in 1974.) The presidency underwent several name changes; it was known as the Executive Committee from 1919 to 1921, the Political Bureau (Politburo) from 1921 to 1952, the Executive Committee from 1952 to 1966 and the Presidency from 1966 until the adjournment of the 14th Congress in 1990. Foreign observers often referred to the presidency as the presidium, in analogy with similar bodies like the Soviet Communist Party Presidium, as Yugoslavia had nominally been a Soviet ally before the Tito-Stalin split.

Until 1966, the LCY was a unitary organisation in which the central party leadership alone controlled cadre appointments and national policy. At the apex of this system was the presidency. This system was reformed after the purge of Josip Broz Tito's long-standing heir apparent Aleksandar Ranković and replaced with a system of equal representation of the LCY's constitutive branches in its presidency. From 1969, each republican LC branch had two representatives and one ex officio member, each autonomous province had one representative and one ex officio member, and the League of Communists Organisation in the Yugoslav People's Army had one ex officio member. In this system, Tito, the LCY leader from 1939 to his death on 4 May 1980, was the only member of the presidency who was not elected to represent a constitutive branch of the LCY, and was an ex officio member through his office of president of the LCY Central Committee. Upon his death, the LCY presidency was abolished and replaced with the office of President of the Presidency of the LCY Central Committee. Officeholders were limited to one-year terms and the offices annually rotated between the LCY's constitutive branches. This was a system of collective leadership, and the presidency president worked with the secretary of the Presidency of the LCY Central Committee, which had a two-year term limit and rotated between the LCY's constitutive branches. The LCY president presided over the work of the presidency and, with the presidency's secretary, set the agenda and organised its sessions.

The post-Tito system of collective leadership succeeded in spreading power, though it was widely argued these reforms weakened the federal party organs at the expense of those of the LCY's branches. Following the 1989 fall of communism in most of Eastern Europe and heightened conflict within the LCY on ethnic lines, the LCY split at its 14th Congress, which was held on 20–22 January 1990. The Congress was adjourned and did not reconvene before May 1990; during the interval, the constituent Leagues in Macedonia, Slovenia and Croatia had left the LCY. On 26 May 1990, the 14th LCY Congress elected the Committee for the Preparation of the Congress of Democratic and Programmatic Renewal of the LCY Central Committee to function as a provisional leadership with the task of convening the 15th LCY Congress, which was never convened. The committee, the last federal organ of the LCY, dissolved itself on 22 January 1991.

The presidency represented the LCY domestically and abroad. It was chiefly responsible for organising and implementing the LCY Central Committee's work and programmes. Decision-making in the presidency, especially after Tito's death, was based on consensus and not decision by majority. All members of the presidency were of equal standing, including the presidency's president and secretary, and had equal responsibilities for implementing the presidency's decisions. Members had the right to speak freely on any topic at its session but could not publicly broadcast dissenting views without the presidency's consent.

== History ==
=== Formation and the Tito–Stalin split: 1919–1966 ===
The 1st Congress of the LCY was held from 20 to 23 April 1919 and established the Socialist Labour Party of Yugoslavia (Communists). The party adopted a statute that stated that the executive committee functioned as the central committee's operational body. The 3rd LCY Congress, which was held from 14 to 22 May 1926, changed the body's name to the Political Bureau of the Central Committee of the Communist Party of Yugoslavia, which was abbreviated to Politburo. The LCY leadership, including its politburo, was dismissed by the Communist International in April 1928, and a new politburo was elected following the 4th Congress, which was held from 3 to 15 November 1928. The most powerful politburo members concurrently served as members of the Secretariat and collectively held the title Secretary of the Central Committee of the Communist Party of Yugoslavia.

Until 1948, informal norms often trumped formal decision-making institutions, which remained weak and underdeveloped. For instance, Josip Broz Tito was elected to the politburo in 1934 and was later elected to the central committee. According to party statutes, only central committee members could serve in the politburo. The politburo was also formally held accountable to the party's central committee but from October 1940 to 12 April 1948, the Central Committee of the 4th Congress did not convene; during this period, the politburo ran the party in the name of the central committee.

On 8 December 1936, the office of General Secretary of the Central Committee of the Communist Party of Yugoslavia was established, and it chaired the politburo and central committee meetings. As general secretary, Tito had considerable influence over the selection of the central committee and its politburo. During the 1940s, Tito began abrogating the politburo's responsibilities and centralised power in his own hands. According to Aleksandar Ranković, a member of both the politburo and the secretariat, exchanges between the Yugoslav party and its counterparts in Austria, Bulgaria, Greece, Hungary, Italy, Slovenia, Switzerland and the Soviet Union were hidden from the politburo. Upon asking Tito at a politburo session to publicise this information to the attendees, Tito responded: "I am the secretary general of the party. I have the right to decide what to tell you and the others." The party secretaries Tito, Ranković, Edvard Kardelj and Milovan Djilas, who comprised the secretariat, had considerable informal influence on the politburo. They would often decide on policies before meetings and get the politburo to rubber stamp them. These power relations remained intact until the dissolution of the secretariat in 1966.

According to Ranković, the statute adopted by the 5th Congress in 1948, "was by and large a copy of the Statute of the Soviet Communist Party". As a result of the Tito–Stalin split, a conflict in which the Soviet political leadership accused the Yugoslav communists of breaking with communism, the LCY began questioning the Soviet model and its suitability for Yugoslavia. The LCY began to stealthily move towards more democracy and the decentralisation of socio-political life. This trend was first confirmed at the 5th Session of the Central Committee of the 5th Congress on 27 May 1952, and later that year at the 6th Congress, which was held from 3 to 7 November. The congress changed the party's name from Communist Party of Yugoslavia to League of Communists of Yugoslavia; according to Tito: "in view of the fact that the role of the Party at this stage of our social development changed to a certain extent ... the word Party is no longer adequate". It was argued designating the LCY as the leading force in society was wrong and accordingly, the 6th Congress stated instead the party "mobilises and moves the broadest masses of the people to action by political and organisational means, so that its struggle and achievements make it a leader". These changes did not affect the LCY's internal organisation or democratic centralism. The Politburo's name was changed to the Executive Committee and the Secretariat was made responsible to it rather than to the Central Committee.

=== The decentralisation of power: 1966–1978 ===
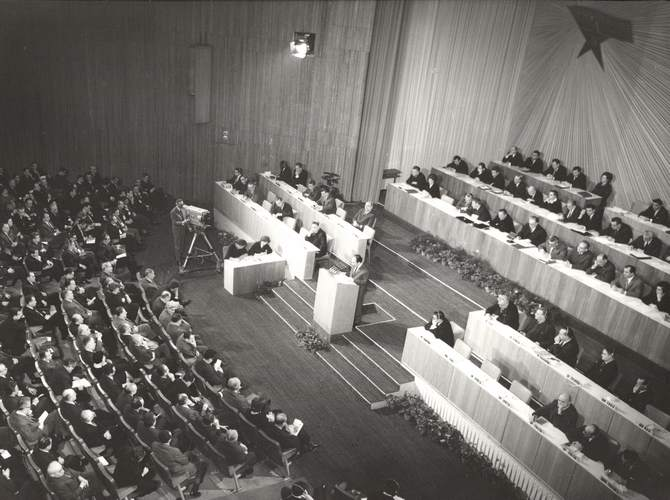
The 8th LCY Congress in 1964 discussed reforming the party structure, but nothing came of it until the 5th Session of the 8th LCY Central Committee.

The institutional framework established at the 6th Congress in 1952 lasted until the 5th Session of the Central Committee of the 8th Congress on 4 October 1966. On 1 July 1966, at the 4th Session of the Central Committee of the 8th Congress, the LCY purged Tito's presumed successor Aleksandar Ranković, the Vice President of Yugoslavia and the head of the State Security Administration, for allegedly bugging Tito's bedroom. To reduce the over-centralisation of power in key individuals, the same session established the 40-member Commission for the Reorganisation and Further Development of the LCY (CRFD–LCY), which was headed by Mijalko Todorović, to recommend party organisational reform. The commission proposed radical measures; Mitja Ribičič proposed abandoning democratic centralism and Krste Crvenkovski talked of the possibility of a non-party democracy and the coming dissolution of the LCY. In September that year, Tito responded by stating neither of these proposals would be debated.

At the 5th Session, the CRFD–LCY proposed abolishing the office of LCY general secretary and replacing it with a President of the LCY Central Committee. On their recommendation, the Executive Committee and the Secretariat were abolished and replaced with two new bodies, the presidency and a new executive committee. The presidency was to be headed by the president while the executive committee was led by a secretary. The executive committee was to execute the presidency's policies and the presidency was to formulate policies. According to the CRFD–LCY, the reorganisation was intended to "put an end to, or at least to reduce to a minimum the danger of monopoly and concentration of competencies". Following the decentralisation of socio-economic life that began with the Tito–Stalin split, the commission proposed to institute a fixed system of representation in the presidency and the executive committee. In the presidency, the League of Communists of Serbia (LC Serbia) and the League of Communists of Croatia (LC Croatia) were each represented by nine members; the League of Communists of Slovenia (LC Slovenia) and the League of Communists of Bosnia-Herzegovina (LC Bosnia-Herzegovina) each with seven members; League of Communists of Macedonia (LC Macedonia) and the League of Communists of Montenegro (LC Montenegro) each with six members; and the League of Communists of Kosovo (LC Kosovo) and the League of Communists of Vojvodina (LC Vojvodina) had one representative each. It was also made clear the presidency and the executive committee were accountable to the sessions of the LCY Central Committee.

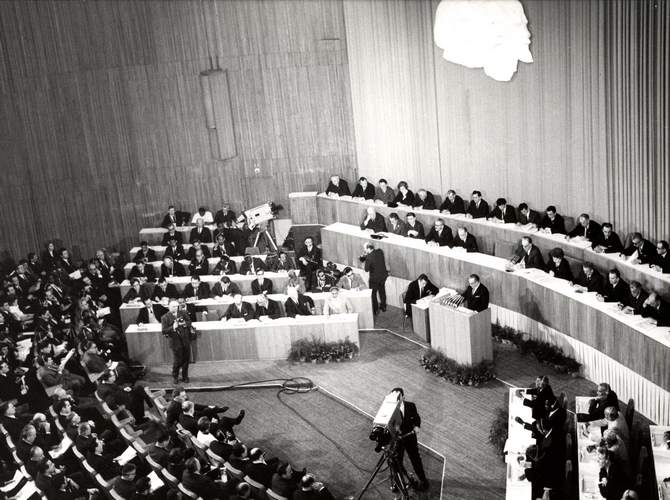
The 9th LCY Congress in 1969 abolished the LCY Central Committee and replaced it with the LCY Conference.

According to Todorović, many commission members feared the reorganisation was insufficient to halt the centralisation of power and that the presidency would do the same as the former executive committee. This fear was confirmed by the reelection of 17 of 18 former executive committee members to the presidency. Fourteen members of the reorganisation commission were also elected to the presidency, and these members may have wanted to implement their own reformist proposals. The reorganisation of the former executive committee and the decentralisation of the appointment of mid-level cadres from the centre to the republican leaderships considerably weakened the new presidency's influence. The delineation of functions between the presidency and the executive committee did not work as planned; the two bodies convened joint sessions rather than working separately. This, combined with the normalisation of term limits and elections in place of the appointment of cadres, also weakened the central party authorities.

At the LCY Central Committee's 7th Session on 1 July 1968, it accepted the commission's proposal to expand the presidency to about fifty members and establish a smaller, non-political secretariat attached to it at the 9th Congress. This proposal was made because the presidency and the executive committee proved too large, and because of this, informal coordination groups were established to enforce policies. The LCY Central Committee also adopted a proposal to be sent to the 9th Congress for its own self-abolition and replacement with a conference. This, by extension, meant that the office of president of the LCY Central Committee was abolished and replaced with that of president of the LCY. At the same session, the Commission for Cadre Policy of the LCY Central Committee proposed the abolition of the existing proportional representation formula approved by the 5th Session and institute equal representation of all republican branches in the presidency. It also proposed a change to method of elections of presidency members. According to the commission, "it is natural that the deciding role in the nomination of members for the [Presidency] of the LCY belongs to the republican organisations of the League of Communists"; it proposed instituting a system in which candidates for the presidency would be nominated by the republican central committees, elected by the republican congresses and verified by the federal congress. The intention was to turn the individuals in question from presidency members who had come from a republic to "representatives of a republic in the central leadership". The 7th Session approved these changes, and by the 9th Congress on 11–15 March 1969, Tito, in his function as LCY president, was the only remnant of an independent party centre. Until the 9th Congress, important decisions were no longer made at federal meetings but through ad-hoc meetings of republican representatives and interpersonal visits.

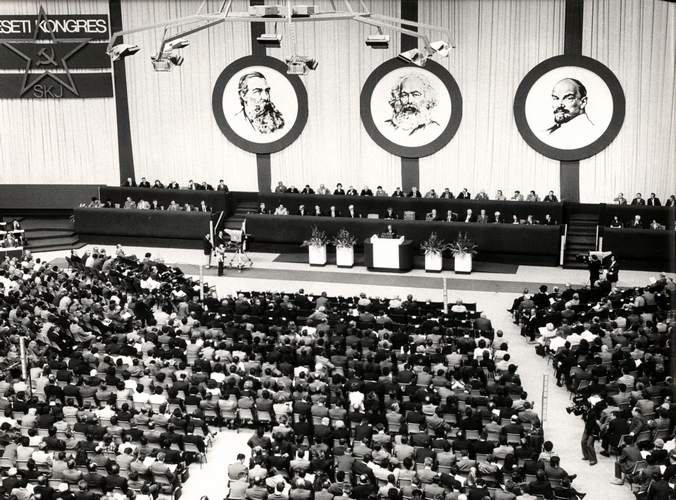
The 10th LCY Congress in 1974 reestablished the LCY Central Committee.

The 9th Congress adopted the LCY Central Committee's suggestions for reorganisation, but before the meeting, Tito had arranged an informal meeting with the republican leaders to discuss the possibility of re-centralisation. Tito informed the congress "we arrived at the mutual view that it is necessary that we strengthen the centre of the leadership of the League of Communists, and particularly the Executive Bureau". The new executive bureau consisted of the LCY president, two members from each republic and one from each autonomous province, and the presidency was expanded to 52 members. Only members of the presidency were eligible to serve in the executive bureau. Some officials, such as Krste Crvenkovski, voiced fears the new organ would re-centralise too much power in their hands; according to Crvenkovski, "in Macedonia, as in other republics, there were certain reservations about the new organisational forms of the leading organs of the LCY". Several rules made that impossible. For instance, all members had to resign from their political positions in the republics and the autonomous provinces. All members except Tito were accountable to the party organisation that elected them, and the members had varied backgrounds that made close collaboration more difficult. Also, the executive bureau met at least once a week, and its responsibilities were broad. It quickly became overwhelmed with work, making it difficult for its members to centralise power. Following the 9th Congress, a report analysing the reorganisation stated the LCY was reduced to an alliance of republican and provincial organisations, and the presidency was reduced to a series of meetings of mutual information and consultation with no obligations to implement the policies agreed upon by its members. The presidency failed, per the "Rules of Procedure on the Organisation and Activity of the Presidency of the League of Communists of Yugoslavia", to convene at least once a month from June to October 1969 and from December 1969 to April 1970.

At the 2nd Conference, which was held from 25 to 27 January 1972, the LCY was re-centralised as a reaction to the Croatian Spring, a political conflict between the LCY and LC Croatia in which the former called for more autonomy for the Socialist Republic of Croatia within Yugoslavia. The executive bureau was reduced from fifteen to eight members. Each member was given different responsibilities and while the branches elected members, they were not supposed to be held accountable to them. The office of Secretary of the Executive Bureau of the LCY Presidency" was established to strengthen the bureau's ability to implement its decisions. The 10th Congress, which was held from 27 to 30 May 1974, formalised these changes by amending the party statute. The congress abolished the conference, re-established the LCY Central Committee and renamed the executive bureau the Executive Committee of the Presidency of the LCY Central Committee. All twelve members of the executive committee were made members of the presidency, blurring the differences between these two organs. A system of executive secretaries of the presidency was established at the 10th Congress; these officeholders were limited to two terms.

=== Collective leadership: 1978–1990 ===
The executive committee was abolished, and the presidency was reduced in size at the 11th Congress, which was held from 20 to 23 June 1978, and the stipulation for the renewal of one-third of its members at every congress was removed. The new presidency was similar to the earlier politburo, and it was given a political and directive role over party affairs. Each presidency member was hereafter given a portfolio and headed a commission. A secretary and several executive secretaries were to be attached to the presidency; these were responsible for "operational work and carrying-out policy", and had "concrete responsibility for specific areas of work". Other amendments to the LCY statute, such as a redefinition of democratic centralism, also strengthened the central party leadership's authority. New lines stated central party organs, which included the presidency, were "the unified political leadership of the entire League of Communists of Yugoslavia", and that each member of the presidency had equal responsibility for the implementation of central party policies. The presidency was given the right to communicate and participate directly in the affairs of the republican organisations and direct communication with mass organisations. The new statute also further clarified the right of the branches of republican, autonomous provinces and the LCY organisation in the Yugoslav People's Army (YPA) to elect and dismiss members of the presidency. The two-term limit for executive secretaries was abolished and replaced with a one-term limit. None of the executive secretaries elected in 1974 were re-elected. According to the new statute, executive secretaries worked under the presidency's leadership by abolishing the executive committee.

Not long after the 11th Congress, on 19 October 1978, the presidency adopted the Rules of Procedure on the Organisation and Working Method of the Presidency to institute and protect collective leadership. It established a new office of Chairman of the Presidency of the LCY Central Committee. In cooperation with the LCY secretary and members of the presidency, the new office would work under the LCY president's instructions. Preparation and scheduling of meetings of the presidency were the chairman's responsibility. In the absence of the LCY president, the chairman presided over the presidency's meetings. When the LCY president was absent from meetings of the presidency, the secretary and chairman had to maintain contact with the chairman to inform him about important questions and the results of the meetings. These responsibilities were formerly assigned to the secretary of the presidency, who was formerly the secretary of the executive committee. The chairmanship was limited to a one-year term and the office rotated in an eight-year cycle among the leadership of the republics, the autonomous provinces and the LCY organisation in the YPA. Term limits were later expanded to include the secretary of the presidency, which had a two-term limit and also rotated in an eight-year cycle. Tito rationalised these reforms on 23 October 1979 at a session of the presidency of the 11th LCY Congress:

"There are some people—I also have those abroad in mind—who believe that the introduction of the post of chairman with a one-year term calls the continuity and stability of development into question. This is not true. ... it is not individuals who ensure the continuity and stability of development but rather the policy line determined by the party and its leaders and the appropriate behaviour of the leading cadres."

Tito died on 4 May 1980. In his last years in power, he seldom participated in decision-making and delegated his authority to the presidency chairman. At first, there was uncertainty about what to do with the office of LCY Central Committee president, but on 12 June 1980, the 11th Session of the Central Committee of the 12th Congress decided to leave the office vacant and delegate its authority to the Central Committee and, between its sessions, to the presidency. The same session renamed the office of chairman of the presidency to President of the Presidency of the LCY Central Committee, and this office functioned as the LCY party leader until the adjournment of the 14th LCY Congress on 26 May 1990. Unlike the LCY president, the presidency president could serve only a one-year term and could not nominate members to the presidency; this authority was delegated to an internal commission of the presidency. These changes were designated as temporary and were formally adopted at the 12th Congress on 26 to 29 June 1982.

Without Tito, the LCY became even more decentralised. With no centralising figure, the LCY became an amalgamation of its branches. Several republican branches opposed the appointment of Dragoslav Marković to the presidency but acquiesced "since it was the business of the Serbian Party". During the 1981 protests in Kosovo, several officials said they first learnt about the crisis through the newspaper rather than through official LCY channels. In the run-up to the 12th Congress, several officials, most of them Serbs from LC Serbia, proposed re-centralising the LCY. In November 1981, the LC Montenegro Central Committee proposed to divest the republican organisations of their right to elect members of the LCY Central Committee while others sought to standardise a two-year term-limit system for the president of the presidency and his counterparts in the branches. The 12th Congress did not approve these changes and instead formalised the temporary changes that were instituted after Tito's death. The congress adopted rules that strengthened the LCY Central Committee vice-a-vice the presidency, making the former more dependent on support in the LCY Central Committee to enact policies. At the 3rd Session of the Central Committee of the 12th Congress on 24 September 1982, LCY presidency president Mitja Ribičič noted the presidency had become a "simple recorder of different attitudes and conditions in the republics and provinces". The re-centralisation debate continued at the 13th LCY Congress, which was held from 25 to 28 June 1986 but the status quo was retained. At the 26th Session of the Central Committee of the 13th Congress, which was held on 11 September 1989, Ivan Brigić, who led the work on formulating amendments to the party statute at the upcoming 14th Congress, proposed abolishing the presidency and replacing it with a new executive body composed of fifteen members and no ex officio members. It also proposed abolishing the office of president of the presidency and reintroducing the office of president of the LCY Central Committee, who would serve a two-year term. The proposed new executive body would not be independent of the LCY Central Committee; its main tasks would be "to ensure that the decisions and conclusions of the LCY [Central Committee] are implemented".

From 20 to 22 January 1990, the LCY convened its 14th Congress. Following the 1989 fall of communism in most of Eastern Europe and in the context of heightened conflict within the LCY on ethnic lines, the Slovene delegation left the congress on 22 January. LC Croatia supported the Slovenes and left as well. The congress went into recess on 22 January and reconvened on 26 May. In the interim, LC Slovena, LC Croatia, and LC Macedonia had left the LCY. Several members of the presidency also left but some, such as president Milan Pančevski, who refused to leave office before his term ended, remained despite the decision of their republican branch. When reconvening on 26 May, the 14th Congress opted not to re-elect the presidency and the central committee, and instead elected a provisional leadership named the Committee for the Preparation of the Congress of Democratic and Programmatic Renewal of the LCY Central Committee. This committee was tasked with convening the 15th LCY Congress and renewing the party organisation. It failed in its task and the committee―the last federal organ of the LCY―self-dissolved on 22 January 1991.

== Authority and powers ==
=== Status ===
The presidency was regulated by the Statute of the League of Communists of Yugoslavia, the Rules of Procedure on the Organisation and Activity of the Presidency of the League of Communists of Yugoslavia from 1969 to 1978, and the Rules of Procedure on the Organisation and Working Method of the Presidency of the League of Communists of Yugoslavia from 1978 until its dissolution. These rules state that when the party congress and the LCY Central Committee were adjourned, the presidency acted as the highest decision-making institution in the LCY and the Socialist Federal Republic of Yugoslavia. The presidency represented the party domestically and abroad. This organ was initially headed by the president of the LCY, an office that was abolished in 1980. From 1980 until the dissolution of the presidency in 1990, it was led by the president of the presidency. The presidency was responsible for organising the work of the LCY Central Committee, executing its work program, and making arrangements for its session. The sessions of the LCY Central Committee were opened by the president of the LCY Presidency and collectively chaired by the Working Presidency of the given Central Committee session, which would be composed of the president and four other members from the Presidency. The presidency had the authority to make decisions regarding urgent measures in specific situations. It had to promptly communicate the efforts undertaken to the LCY Central Committee, seeking approval for its action at the subsequent session. The presidency's work and activities were accountable to the LCY Central Committee. The president, secretary, and members of the presidency were accountable to both the presidency and the LCY Central Committee.

The presidency acted as the LCY Central Committee's political-executive organ and it worked according to the party congress' political guidelines and conclusions, and the political platform, political standpoint and assignments of the LCY Central Committee. The presidency was responsible for making political decisions to ensure the implementation of the policies adopted by Congress and the LCY Central Committee. The presidency raised and discussed ideological and political issues, formulated and defined policy, and directed the party's activity. It was also empowered to quickly respond to political developments and formulate political opinions on the party's behalf. The presidency also initiated, directed and organised actions and adjusted ideological-political activities in coordination with the central and provincial committees and the Committee of the LCY Organisation in the Yugoslav People's Army (YPA). Additionally, it was responsible for assessing the political and ideological situation and putting into practice policies, standpoints, and decisions adopted by the party. It formulated policies and initiated and guided the party's actions in international affairs, and was tasked with considering initiatives and proposals of other party organs. The presidency's other responsibilities included collaborating with central and regional committees and the LCY organisation's political-executive organs to exchange ideas and information on current ideological-political issues and plan attitudes and policies. It was responsible for communicating information to members of the LCY and the public, and reporting on current ideological-political issues and activities of the central committee, its own activities and those of the LCY. The presidency had the right to guide the activities of the party organisation in the YPA but had to report this to the party congress. It was also responsible for overseeing party activities in the YPA and taking measures it saw fit; these actions had to be reported to the LCY Central Committee. The presidency could appoint officials to serve in the Committee of the LCY organisation in the YPA, the highest body of that party organisation.

=== Decision-making process ===
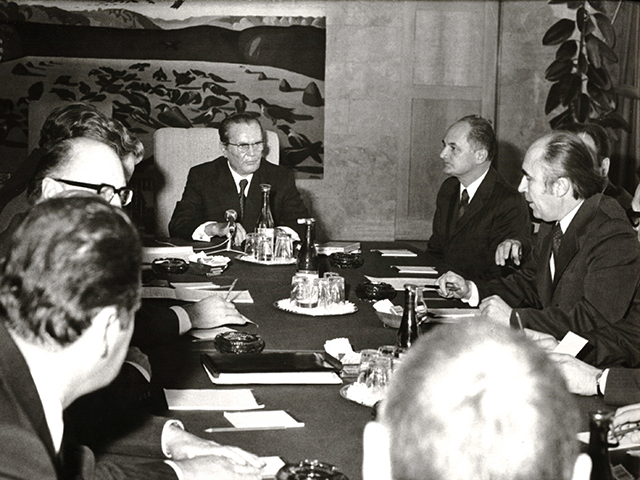
A session of the Executive Committee of the LCY Presidency on 9 December 1974. At this point, all members of the executive committee concurrently served as members of the LCY Presidency.

A session of the presidency could be convened by both its internal officeholders such as the LCY president, individual members and executive secretaries, and at the initiative of league branches in the republics and autonomous provinces by the Commission on Statutory Questions and the Supervisory Commission. The LCY president had the right to preside over the presidency's sessions. The 1974 Yugoslav Constitution and the 10th LCY Congress made consensus decision-making the norm of the sessions of the LCY Presidency and league's federal institutions. The republics and autonomous provinces, which had a prescribed number of representatives in the LCY Presidency, negotiated with each other to formulate and set federal policies. When Tito was alive, a centralising figure could lead such work but the system became more decentralised following his death in 1980. Despite its decentralised nature, this system was still deemed to be in line with democratic centralism. At the 12th LCY Congress, Stane Dolanc criticised those who wanted to return to the pre-1966 system, stating: "those who consciously wish to change the principle of democratic centralism into an instrument of centralism, of unitarism and etatism ... the negation of our basic programmatic goals and, in essence, counter-revolutionary activity". Presidency member Hamdija Pozderac also argued in favour of the LCY's interpretation of democratic centralism at the congress, stating: "the highest form of democratic centralism is the unanimity of a decision". The need for consensus had become a cultural phenomenon. The Rules of Procedure on the Organisation and Activity of the Presidency of the League of Communists of Yugoslavia, which were adopted in 1969, stated a simple majority could adopt some decisions while more important decisions required a two-thirds majority.

On 19 October 1978, the presidency adopted the Rules of Procedure on the Organisation and Working Method of the Presidency of the League of Communists of Yugoslavia to regulate the presidency's "organisation and method of work". The 1978 rules of procedure were based on the LCY Statute's Article 85 and contained 69 articles. The document stipulates the presidency "is a collective, democratic, and political body in which all members have equal rights and responsibilities for its entire work in all areas of its activities". Except for the President of the LCY, no members had the right to make decisions on behalf of the presidency between its sessions. Article 32 of the rules of procedure state:

If, between two sessions of the [presidency], certain decisions are made at a restricted meeting in accordance with the statutory rights of the LCY president, the chairman, that is, the secretary of the [presidency], will orally or in writing inform the other members of the [presidency] at the next session. The information will be included in the session's protocol.

The remaining members had, according to Article 34, "equal rights and duties, and, according to Article 1, "equal rights and responsibilities" for the "entire work" of the presidency. During a session, an ordinary member of the presidency could freely express their views and had the right to propose questions for consideration at sessions. Such views could not be disseminated to external bodies or to the public without the presidency's permission. A member was responsible for the work of the presidency as a whole, as well as the decisions taken by it. Members were held individually accountable for their area fof responsibility.

Article 30 of the 1978 rules of procedure states that at least two-thirds of members had to participate in a presidency session for the body to make a decision. If problems had to be urgently discussed and the necessary number of members were unavailable, the presidency could make decisions if more than half of its members were present. For a decision to be valid, the members present had to constitute a simple majority for the proposal to take effect. The LCY President was the exception to this rule; the officeholder—in this case, Tito—had the right to make binding decisions on behalf of the presidency without majority support in the presidency. Members from republics and autonomous provinces who did not participate in the ordinary session of the presidency had the right to be informed as soon as possible of the issues discussed, and their opinions had to be expressed for the adopted decisions to take effect. If all three representatives from a republican branch were unable to attend a session of the presidency, their opinions were required before the decision would become effective. The member could approve the decision on behalf of the non-participating members if at least one representative from a republican branch were present. According to Article 32, if the LCY president summoned a session of the presidency, the officeholder could limit the number of participants and inform non-participants of the decision on a later, unspecified date. Every decision of the presidency had to be taken by an open ballot unless decided otherwise.

=== Leadership ===
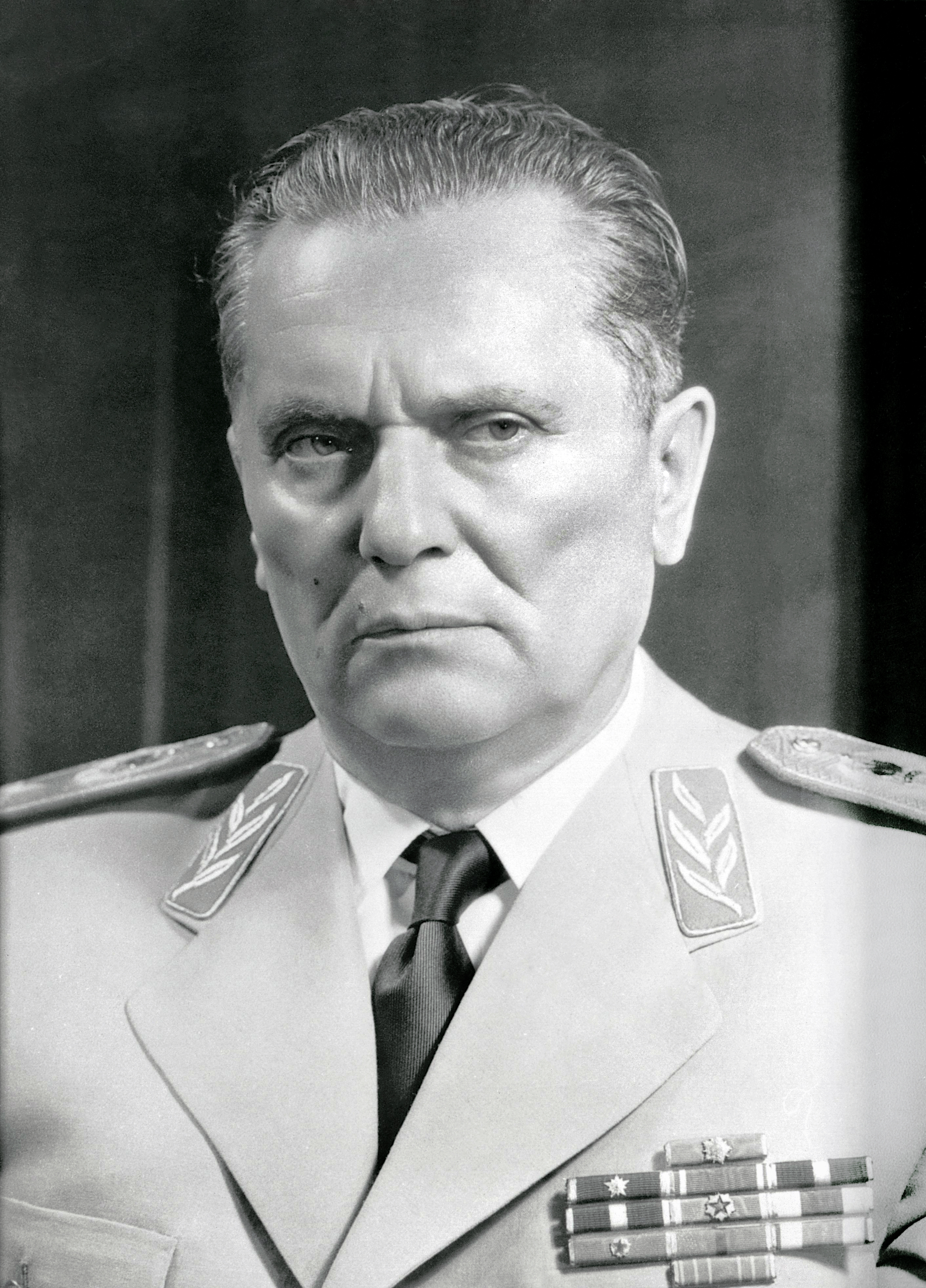
Tito was the longest-serving leader of the LCY, and presided over the work of presidency as party president.

From its inception and the change from the politburo to the executive committee, the presidency was led by a political secretary from 1919 to 1936 and a general secretary from 1936 to 1966. The role of general secretary was abolished in the 1966 reforms, and the office of President of the LCY Central Committee was established, but this office was abolished on 15 March 1969 by a decision of the 9th Congress and replaced with the office of president of the LCY. The president led the presidency's work until Tito's death on 4 May 1980. At the 2nd Conference, which was held from 25 to 27 January 1972, the office of Secretary of the Executive Bureau of the Presidency of the LCY Central Committee was established with Stane Dolanc as its first incumbent. On 19 October 1978, the presidency established the office of Chairman of the Presidency of the Central Committee of the League of Communists of Yugoslavia and elected Branko Mikulić as its first incumbent. The LCY president was the primus inter pares of these three offices but following Tito's death, the LCY Central Committee abolished the chairmanship and rename the office President of the Presidency of the Central Committee of the League of Communists of Yugoslavia. There were no term limits for the LCY president, but the chairman, and later president of the presidency, had a one-year term limit, while the secretary had a two-year term limit.

As originally conceived, the chairman was to preside over sessions of the presidency when the LCY president was prevented from doing so. In conjunction with the presidency secretary, the relevant presidency member in charge of the policy area in question and the executive secretaries, the chairman could set the agenda for sessions of the presidency. This was unlike the LCY president, who could set the agenda alone. In a manner similar to the LCY president, the chairman had the right to maintain communications with Yugoslav mass organisations, individuals in government and the Assembly of Yugoslavia. Despite this, the chairman, and later president of the presidency, was not a leader. According to Article 43 of the Rules of Procedure on the Organisation and Working Method of the Presidency, the incumbent, alongside the secretary of the presidency, had to maintain contact with individual presidency members and the presidency. The presidency president could only implement the work programme and decisions adopted by the LCY Central Committee and the presidency after consulting with the secretary and individual members. According to scholar Slobodan Stanković, these stipulations were intended to ensure the president and secretary supervised each other and that the presidency supervised them.

=== Secretaries ===
The secretaries of the LCY Central Committee had different roles throughout the LCY's existence. Until 1966, the secretaries dominated the decision-making process by concurrently serving as politburo members. From 1966 onwards, the secretaries' influence was gradually weakened. The 5th Session of the Central Committee of the 8th Congress on 4 October 1966 abolished the LCY Secretariat and replaced it with a new LCY Executive Committee that had its own head, the Secretary of the Executive Committee of the Presidency of the League of Communists of Yugoslavia, and was to be held accountable to the sessions of the LCY Central Committee. This organ was abolished by the 9th LCY Congress on 11–15 March 1969. The 2nd LCY Conference, which was held from 25 to 27 January 1972, re-established the office of the secretary and the executive committee. The 10th LCY Congress, which was held from 27 to 30 May 1974, instituted a system of a leading secretary and several executive secretaries. Each executive secretary represented a republic, an autonomous province or the LCY organisation in the YPA. While holding the formal title of Secretary or Executive Secretary of the Presidency, none of the secretaries were members of the presidency but rather ordinary members of the LCY Central Committee. The executive secretaries were accountable to the LCY secretary, whom the presidency held accountable for all of the secretaries' work. Before the establishment of the chairmanship on 19 October 1978, the secretary was, under the terms of his functions, responsible for organising the supervision and implementation of the ideologies, decisions, and resolutions adopted by the presidency. The secretary prepared the presidency sessions in agreement with the LCY president. The secretary also coordinated the work of executive secretaries and performed other duties the presidency assigned. From then on, the secretary, in conjunction with the chairman and later the president of the presidency, shared power.

== Members ==
=== Branch representation and election ===
From 1966 to 1969, the LC republican branches were represented in the LCY presidency according to a proportional representational formula, giving representatives from LC Serbia a majority in the presidency. This formula was abolished and replaced with equal representation at the 9th LCY Congress, which was held from 11 to 15 March 1969, in which every republic was equally represented. In this new system, the autonomous provinces of Serbia were given representation in the presidency to represent their own provincial interests rather than those exclusive to Serbia. Each republican LC branch had two representatives in the presidency and one ex officio member, while each autonomous provincial LC branch had one representative and one ex officio member. The LCY Organisation in the Yugoslav People's Army had one ex officio member. The ex officio members were leaders of the LC branch in question. For example, the ex officio member of the LC Croatia was the President of the LC Croatia Central Committee.

Membership of the LCY Central Committee was required for one to be eligible for election to the presidency. Until the 11th Session of the Central Committee of the 11th Congress, held on 12 June 1980, the president of the LCY was empowered, after consulting with the leadership of the LCY's constitutive branches, to nominate individuals to serve in the LCY Presidency. With the replacement of the LCY president with the president of the LCY Presidency, the right to nominate members was transferred to a commission elected by the LCY Presidency. This commission was composed of the president and the secretary of the LCY Presidency as well as the presidents of the republican, autonomous provincial, and army branches. The commission was also empowered to remove members mid-term. The party statute regulated the number of members in the presidency. As an example, the statute of the 12th LCY Congress prescribed the presidency would consist of 23 members. LCY presidency members were nominated by the LC branch they represented; for example, a Macedonian member of the presidency was nominated by the party congress of the League of Communists of Macedonia and later formally elected by the LCY Central Committee. Despite this arrangement, these members were not accountable to the branches and were to work for the interests of Yugoslavia rather than its constitutive provinces. The 10th LCY Congress clarified this, stating: "The working class needs a unified revolutionary vanguard ... such a role could not be performed by an organisation on the lines of a 'federal coalition' of republican and provincial organisations, or by a centralised 'supra-republic' organisation". According to the 1982 statute, presidency members could serve for only two consecutive electoral terms, and only in exceptional circumstances could be elected for a third consecutive term.

=== Political positions ===
Beginning with the reforms of the 5th Session of the Central Committee of the 8th Congress on 4 October 1966, some members favoured a reduction of the LCY's direct interference in government affairs. On 16 May 1967, the government was re-organised and Petar Stambolić resigned as president of the Federal Executive Council—the Yugoslav government—and was replaced by Mika Špiljak. In the reshuffle, all but three presidency members—Tito, Špiljak and Rudi Kolak—lost their government positions. At the 10th LCY Congress in 1974, all nine members of the Presidency of the Socialist Federal Republic of Yugoslavia—the state presidency—were elected to the party presidency, with each province and autonomous province represented and the LCY president as an ex officio member. The LCY's president remained an ex-officio member of the state presidency until the 1988 constitutional amendments, when the party presidency lost its representational right. At the 11th LCY Congress in 1978, only five individuals concurrently served in the state and party presidencies; these were Tito, Vladimir Bakarić, Petar Stambolić, Fadilj Hodža and Stevan Doronjski. Other presidency members held other state functions, such as Veselin Đuranović, who served as Federal Executive Council president and Nikola Ljubičić, who served as the Federal Secretary of People's Defence. The last three presidents of the Federal Executive Council Milka Planinc, Branko Mikulić and Ante Marković were not members of the LCY presidency.

== Bibliography ==
=== Books and thesises ===
- Историја Савеза комуниста Југославије [History of the League of Communists of Yugoslavia] (in Serbo-Croatian). Publishing Center "Komunist"; Narodna knjiga; Rad. 1985. COBISS 68649479
- Burg, Steven L. (1983). Conflict and Cohesion in Socialist Yugoslavia: Political Decision Making since 1966. Princeton University Press. ISBN 0-691-07651-0.
- Carter, April (1982). Democratic Reform in Yugoslavia: The Changing Role of the Party. Frances Pinter Publishers. ISBN 0-903804-88-3.
- Jancar, Barbara (1985). "Chapter 9: The New Feminism in Yugoslavia". In Ramet, Pedro (ed.). Yugoslavia in the 1980s. Westview Special Studies on the Soviet Union and Eastern Europe. Westview Press. ISBN 0-8133-7012-4.
- Klemenčič, Matjaž; Žagar, Mitja (2004). The Former Yugoslavia's Diverse Peoples: A Reference Sourcebook. ABC-CLIO. ISBN 978-1-57607-294-3.
- McCrea, Barbara P. (1969). The Yugoslav Communist Party: Decentralization and Reorganization (Thesis). Western Michigan University. Archived from the original on 28 September 2023.
- Neal, Fred Warner (1958). Titoism in Action: The Reforms in Yugoslavia After 1948. University of California Press. ISBN 978-0-520-35044-1.
- Pirjevec, Jože (2018). Tito and His Comrades. University of Wisconsin Press. ISBN 9780299317706.
- Rusinow, Dennison (1978). The Yugoslav Experiment 1948–1974. University of California Press. ISBN 0-520-03730-8.
- Shaffer, Harry G. (1967). "Yugoslavia's "Own Road to Socialism": A Non-Marxist View". In Shaffer, Harry G. (ed.). The Communist World: Marxist and Non-Marxist Views (2nd ed.). Meredith Publishing Company. pp. 223–259. ISBN 9780891970934.
- Simons, Williams B.; White, Stephen, eds. (1984). "The Statute of the League of Communists of Yugoslavia". The Party Statutes of the Communist World. Law in Eastern Europe. Martinus Nijhoff Publishers. pp. 485–533. ISBN 90-247-2975-0.
- Stanković, Slobodan (1981). Staar, Richard F. (ed.). The End of the Tito Era: Yugoslavia's Dilemmas. Hoover International Studies. Hoover Institution Press. ISBN 9780817973629.
- Vinterhalter, Vilko (1972). In the Path of Tito. Abacus Press. ISBN 9780856260117.

=== Journal articles and reports ===
- Andrejevich, Milan (1989). "Yugoslav Views on Pluralism and Poland". Situation Report (18 September 1989). Radio Free Europe/Radio Liberty Research: 3–10.
- Djordjioski, Boris (1990). "Macedonian Communists against Pancevski". Daily Report: East Europe. Vol. 61–70. Foreign Broadcast Information Service. p. 65.
- Johnson, A. Ross (1983). "Political Leadership in Yugoslavia: Evolution of the League of Communists" (PDF). Rand Publications Series: The Report. United States Department of State. Archived (PDF) from the original on 2 June 2023.
- Miller, Robert F. (1982). "The 12th congress of the league of communists of Yugoslavia: The succession process continues". Australian Outlook. 36 (3): 11–18. doi:10.1080/10357718208444789.
- Neal, Fred Warner (1957). "The Communist Party in Yugoslavia". The American Political Science Review. 51 (1): 88–111. doi:10.2307/1951773. JSTOR 1951773. S2CID 146357000.
- Ramet, Pedro (1984). "Political Struggle and Institutional Reorganization in Yugoslavia". Political Science Quarterly. 99 (2): 289–301. doi:10.2307/2150406. JSTOR 2150406.
- Remington, Robin Alison (1987). "Nation versus Class in Yugoslavia". Current History. 86 (523): 365–368. JSTOR 45315975.
- Reuter, Jens (1980). "Führungsprobleme des BdKJ" [Leadership Problems of the LCY]. Comparative Southeast European Studies (in German). 29 (8): 189–192. doi:10.1515/soeu-1980-290803.
- Shoup, Paul (1959). "Problems of Party Reform in Yugoslavia". The American Slavic and East European Review. 18 (3): 334–350. doi:10.2307/3004130. JSTOR 3004130.
- Singleton, F.B. (1980). "Yugoslavia without Tito". The World Today. 36 (6): 204–208. JSTOR 40395190.
