= Central Committee of the 6th Congress of the League of Communists of Yugoslavia =

6th Central Committee
- Emblem of the League of Communists of Yugoslavia

7 November 1952 – 26 April 1958 (5 years, 170 days) Overview
- Type: Highest organ
- Election: 6th Congress

Members
- Total: 109 members
- Newcomers: 50 members (7th)
- Old: 59 members (5th)
- Reelected: 103 members (7th)

Meeting place
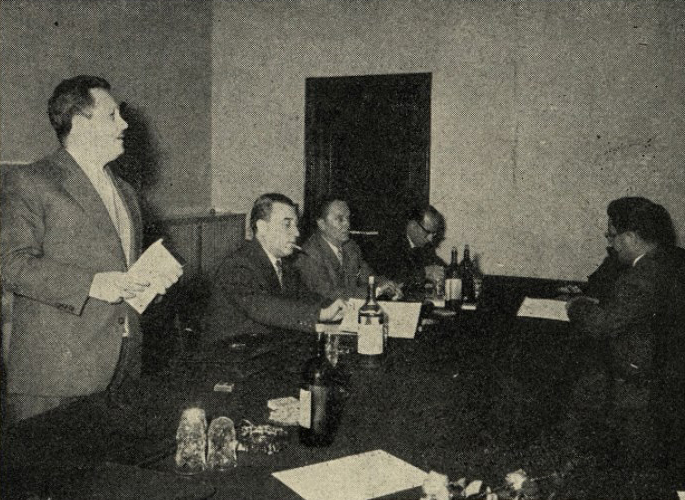
- A picture from the 9th Session of the 6th Congress.

This electoral term of the Central Committee was elected by the 6th Congress of the League of Communists of Yugoslavia in 1952, and was in session until the convocation of the 7th Congress in 1958.

== Convocations ==
Meetings of the Central Committee of the 6th Congress
Meeting	Date	Type	Length	Ref.
1st Session	7 November 1952	Ordinary	1 day	
2nd Session	16–17 June 1953	Ordinary	2 days	
3rd Session	16–17 January 1954	Extraordinary	2 days	
4th Session	30 March 1954	Ordinary	1 day	
5th Session	26 November 1954	Ordinary	1 day	
6th Session	13–14 March 1955	Ordinary	2 days	
7th Session	1 February 1956	Ordinary	1 day	
8th Session	9 September 1957	Ordinary	1 day	
9th Session	7 December 1957	Ordinary	1 day	

== Composition ==
Members of the Central Committee of the 6th Congress of the League of Communists of Yugoslavia
Name	5th	7th	Birth	PM	Death	Branch	Nationality	Gender	Ref.
Vera Aceva	Old	Elected	1919	1940	2006	Macedonia	Macedonian	Female	
Risto Antunović	New	Elected	1917	1940	1998	Serbia	Serb	Male	
Ljupčo Arsov	Candidate	Elected	1910	1940	1986	Macedonia	Macedonian	Male	
Viktor Avbelj	Candidate	Elected	1914	1937	1993	Slovenia	Slovene	Male	
Spasenija Babović	Old	Elected	1907	1928	1977	Serbia	Serb	Female	
Vladimir Bakarić	Old	Elected	1912	1933	1983	Croatia	Croat	Male	
Aleš Bebler	Candidate	Elected	1907	1929	1981	Slovenia	Slovenes	Male	
Vlajko Begović	Candidate	Elected	1905	1930	1989	Bosnia-Herzegovina	Serb	Male	
Marko Belinić	Candidate	Elected	1911	1934	2004	Croatia	Croat	Male	
Anka Berus	New	Elected	1903	1934	1991	Croatia	Croat	Female	
Antun Biber	Old	Elected	1910	1939	1995	Croatia	Croat	Male	
Jakov Blažević	Old	Elected	1912	1928	1996	Croatia	Croat	Male	
Ivan Božičević	New	Elected	1909	1934	1999	Croatia	Croat	Male	
Hasan Brkić	New	Elected	1913	1933	1965	Bosnia-Herzegovina	Muslim	Male	
Zvonko Brkić	Candidate	Elected	1912	1935	1977	Croatia	Croat	Male	
Josip Cazi	New	Elected	1907	1941	1977	Croatia	Croat	Male	
Rodoljub Čolaković	Old	Elected	1900	1919	1983	Bosnia-Herzegovina	Serb	Male	
Krste Crvenkovski	Candidate	Elected	1921	1939	2001	Macedonia	Macedonian	Male	
Uglješa Danilović	Old	Elected	1913	1935	2003	Bosnia-Herzegovina	Serb	Male	
Peko Dapčević	New	Elected	1913	1933	1999	Montenegro	Montenegrin	Male	
Vladimir Dedijer	New	Expelled	1914	1939	1990	Serbia	Serb	Male	
Milovan Đilas	Old	Expelled	1911	1933	1995	Montenegro	Montenegrin	Male	
Stevan Doronjski	New	Elected	1919	1939	1981	Serbia	Serb	Male	
Ilija Došen	Candidate	Elected	1914	1936	1991	Bosnia-Herzegovina	Serb	Male	
Ratomir Dugonjić	Old	Elected	1916	1937	1987	Bosnia-Herzegovina	Serb	Male	
Strahil Gigov	Old	Elected	1909	1929	1999	Macedonia	Macedonian	Male	
Ivan Gošnjak	Old	Elected	1909	1933	1980	Croatia	Croat	Male	
Pavle Gregorić	Old	Elected	1892	1921	1989	Croatia	Croat	Male	
Janez Hribar	Old	Elected	1909	1939	1967	Slovenia	Slovene	Male	
Josip Hrnčević	New	Elected	1901	1933	1994	Croatia	Croat	Male	
Avdo Humo	Old	Elected	1914	1941	1983	Bosnia-Herzegovina	Muslim	Male	
Vlado Janić	Old	Elected	1904	1931	1991	Croatia	Croat	Male	
Blažo Jovanović	Old	Elected	1907	1924	1976	Montenegro	Montenegrin	Male	
Isa Jovanović	Old	Elected	1906	1928	1983	Serbia	Serb	Male	
Niko Jurinčić	Old	Elected	1914	1935	1983	Bosnia-Herzegovina	Serb	Male	
Osman Karabegović	Old	Elected	1911	1932	1996	Bosnia-Herzegovina	Muslim	Male	
Ivan Karaivanov	New	Elected	1889	1945	1960	Macedonia	Bulgarian	Male	
Edvard Kardelj	Old	Elected	1910	1928	1979	Slovenia	Slovene	Male	
Stane Kavčič	Candidate	Elected	1919	1941	1987	Slovenia	Slovene	Male	
Boris Kidrič	Old	Died	1912	1928	1953	Slovenia	Slovene	Male	
Lazar Koliševski	Old	Elected	1914	1935	2000	Macedonia	Macedonian	Male	
Slavko Komar	Candidate	Elected	1918	1940	2012	Croatia	Croat	Male	
Nikola Kovačević	Old	Elected	1890	1920	1964	Montenegro	Montenegrin	Male	
Ivan Krajačić	Old	Elected	1906	1934	1986	Croatia	Croat	Male	
Boris Kraigher	Old	Elected	1914	1934	1967	Slovenia	Slovene	Male	
Sergej Kraigher	New	Elected	1914	1934	2001	Slovenia	Slovene	Male	
Otmar Kreačić	New	Elected	1913	1937	1992	Croatia	Croat	Male	
Vladimir Krivic	New	Elected	1914	1933	1996	Slovenia	Slovene	Male	
Vicko Krstulović	Old	Elected	1905	1922	1988	Croatia	Croat	Male	
Voja Leković	Old	Elected	1912	1939	1997	Serbia	Serb	Male	
Franc Leskošek	Old	Elected	1897	1926	1983	Slovenia	Slovene	Male	
Ivan Maček	Old	Elected	1908	1930	1993	Slovenia	Slovene	Male	
Šefket Maglajlić	Old	Elected	1912	1932	1983	Bosnia-Herzegovina	Muslim	Male	
Pašaga Mandžić	Candidate	Elected	1907	1929	1975	Bosnia-Herzegovina	Serb	Male	
Miha Marinko	Old	Elected	1900	1923	1983	Slovenia	Slovene	Male	
Moma Marković	Old	Elected	1912	1933	1992	Serbia	Serb	Male	
Božidar Maslarić	Old	Elected	1895	1920	1963	Croatia	Croat	Male	
Veljko Mićunović	Candidate	Elected	1916	1934	1982	Montenegro	Montenegrin	Male	
Cvijetin Mijatović	Old	Elected	1913	1934	1993	Bosnia-Herzegovina	Serb	Male	
Nikola Minčev	New	Elected	1915	1942	1997	Macedonia	Macedonian	Male	
Miloš Minić	Candidate	Elected	1915	1936	2000	Serbia	Serb	Male	
Mitra Mitrović	New	Not	1912	1933	2001	Serbia	Serb	Female	
Karlo Mrazović	Old	Elected	1902	1927	1987	Croatia	Croat	Male	
Andrija Mugoša	Old	Elected	1910	1933	2006	Montenegro	Montenegrin	Male	
Kosta Nađ	New	Elected	1911	1937	1986	Serbia	Hungarian	Male	
Naum Naumovski	Candidate	Elected	1920	1940	1960	Macedonia	Macedonian	Male	
Radisav Nedeljković	New	Elected	1911	1937	1996	Serbia	Serb	Male	
Milijan Neoričić	Candidate	Elected	1922	1941	2014	Serbia	Serb	Male	
Džavid Nimani	Candidate	Elected	1919	1941	2000	Serbia	Albanian	Male	
Đorđije Pajković	Old	Elected	1917	1936	1980	Montenegro	Montenegrin	Male	
Slobodan Penezić	Old	Elected	1918	1939	1964	Serbia	Serb	Male	
Puniša Perović	Candidate	Elected	1911	1933	1984	Montenegro	Montenegrin	Male	
Dušan Petrović	Old	Elected	1914	1935	1977	Serbia	Serb	Male	
Moša Pijade	Old	Died	1890	1920	1957	Serbia	Serb /Jewish	Male	
Mile Počuča	Candidate	Elected	1899	1923	1980	Croatia	Croat	Male	
Krsto Popivoda	Old	Elected	1910	1933	1988	Montenegro	Montenegrin	Male	
Koča Popović	New	Elected	1908	1933	1992	Serbia	Serb	Male	
Milentije Popović	Old	Elected	1913	1939	1971	Serbia	Serb	Male	
Vladimir Popović	Old	Elected	1914	1932	1972	Montenegro	Montenegrin	Male	
Jože Potrč	Candidate	Elected	1903	1924	1963	Slovenia	Slovene	Male	
Srđa Prica	New	Elected	1905	1926	1984	Croatia	Croat	Male	
Đuro Pucar	Old	Elected	1899	1922	1979	Bosnia-Herzegovina	Serb	Male	
Dobrivoje Radosavljević	Old	Elected	1915	1933	1984	Serbia	Serb	Male	
Aleksandar Ranković	Old	Elected	1909	1928	1983	Serbia	Serb	Male	
Ivan Regent	Old	Elected	1884	1945	1967	Slovenia	Slovene	Male	
Paško Romac	New	Elected	1913	1935	1982	Serbia	Serb	Male	
Ivan Rukavina	New	Elected	1912	1935	1992	Croatia	Croat	Male	
Đuro Salaj	Old	Elected	1899	1919	1958	Croatia	Croat	Male	
Vlado Šegrt	Candidate	Elected	1907	1931	1991	Bosnia-Herzegovina	Serb	Male	
Nikola Sekulić	New	Elected	1911	1931	2002	Croatia	Croat	Male	
Lidija Šentjurc	Candidate	Elected	1911	1932	2000	Slovenia	Slovene	Female	
Vidoje Smilevski	Old	Elected	1915	1940	1979	Macedonia	Macedonian	Male	
Pal Šoti	Candidate	Elected	1916	1936	1993	Serbia	Hungarian	Male	
Mika Špiljak	New	Elected	1916	1938	2007	Croatia	Croat	Male	
Petar Stambolić	Old	Elected	1912	1935	2007	Serbia	Serb	Male	
Dragi Stamenković	Old	Elected	1920	1937	2004	Serbia	Serb	Male	
Svetislav Stefanović	Candidate	Elected	1910	1928	1980	Serbia	Serb	Male	
Velimir Stojnić	Candidate	Elected	1916	1936	1990	Bosnia-Herzegovina	Serb	Male	
Mihailo Švabić	New	Elected	1919	1938	2002	Serbia	Serb	Male	
Borko Temelkovski	Old	Elected	1919	1939	2001	Macedonia	Macedonian	Male	
Josip Broz Tito	Old	Elected	1892	1920	1980	Not made public	Croat	Male	
Mijalko Todorović	New	Elected	1913	1938	1999	Serbia	Serb	Male	
Vida Tomšič	Old	Elected	1913	1934	1998	Slovenia	Slovene	Female	
Cvetko Uzunovski	Old	Not	1912	1937	1994	Macedonia	Macedonian	Male	
Jovan Veselinov	Old	Elected	1906	1923	1982	Serbia	Serb	Male	
Veljko Vlahović	Old	Elected	1914	1935	1975	Montenegro	Montenegrin	Male	
Svetozar Vukmanović	Old	Elected	1912	1933	2000	Montenegro	Montenegrin	Male	
Veljko Zeković	Old	Elected	1906	1934	1985	Montenegro	Montenegrin	Male	
Boris Ziherl	Candidate	Elected	1910	1930	1976	Slovenia	Slovene	Male	

== Bibliography ==
- Bechev, Dimitar (2019). Historical Dictionary of North Macedonia. Rowman & Littlefield Publishers. ISBN 9781538119617.
- Neal, Fred Warner (1958). Titoism in Action: The Reforms in Yugoslavia After 1948. University of California Press. ISBN 978-0-520-35044-1.
- Pirjevec, Jože (2018). Tito and His Comrades. University of Wisconsin Press. ISBN 9780299317706.
- Rajak, Svetozar (2011). Yugoslavia and the Soviet Union in the Early Cold War: Reconciliation, comradeship, confrontation, 1953–1957. Routledge. ISBN 978-0-415-38074-4.
- Rusinow, Dennison (1978). The Yugoslav Experiment 1948–1974. University of California Press. ISBN 0-520-03730-8.
- Staff writer, ed. (1948). Odluke V. kongresa Komunističke Partije Jugoslavije [Decisions of the Fifth Congress of the Communist Party of Yugoslavia] (in Serbo-Croatian). Kultura.
- Staff writer, ed. (1953). VI kongres Komunističke partije Jugoslavije: 2-7 novembra 1952: stenografske beleške [VI Congress of the Communist Party of Yugoslavia] (in Serbo-Croatian). Kultura.
- Staff writer, ed. (1965). VIII Kongres Saveza Komunista Jugoslavije Beograd, 7–13. decembra 1964.: stenog̈rafske beleške [VIII Congress of the Union of Communists of Yugoslavia Belgrade, 7–13 December 1964: shorthand notes] (in Croatian). Vol. 3. Kultura.
- Staff writer, ed. (1966). Svjetski almanah [World Almanac] (in Serbo-Croatian). Vol. 4. Novinsko izdavačko poduzeće.
- Janković, Slavko, ed. (1957). Ko je ko u Jugoslaviji: biografski podaci o jugoslovenskim savremenicima [Who's Who in Yugoslavia: Biographical Information About Yugoslav Contemporaries] (in Serbo-Croatian). Vol. 3. Izd. "Sedme sile".
- Nešović, Slobodan (1977). Diplomatska igra oko Jugoslavije 1944–1945. Stvarnost. ISBN 978-3-030-54951-0.
- Lewytzkyj, Borys; Stroynowski, Juliusz, eds. (1978). Who's Who in the Socialist Countries. K. G. Saur Verlag. ISBN 3-7940-3017-6.
- Stroynowski, Juliusz, ed. (1989a). Who's Who in the Socialist Countries of Europe: A–H. K. G. Saur Verlag. ISBN 3-598-10719-6.
- Stroynowski, Juliusz, ed. (1989b). Who's Who in the Socialist Countries of Europe: I–O. K. G. Saur Verlag. ISBN 3-598-10719-6.
- Stroynowski, Juliusz, ed. (1989c). Who's Who in the Socialist Countries of Europe: P–Z. K. G. Saur Verlag. ISBN 3-598-10719-6.
- Zalar, Charles, ed. (1961). Yugoslav Communism: A Critical Study. United States Government Printing Office. Archived from the original on 11 June 2023.
