= Central Committee of the 5th Congress of the Communist Party of Yugoslavia =

5th Central Committee
- Emblem of the League of Communists of Yugoslavia

28 July 1948 – 7 November 1952 (4 years, 102 days) Overview
- Type: Highest organ
- Election: 5th Congress

Members
- Total: 63 members
- Newcomers: 46 members (7th)
- Old: 17 members (4th)
- Reelected: 58 members (6th)

This electoral term of the Central Committee was elected by the 5th Congress of the Communist Party of Yugoslavia in 1948, and was in session until the gathering of the 6th Congress in 1952.

== Convocations ==
Meetings of the Central Committee of the 5th Congress
Meeting	Date	Length	Ref.
1st Session	28 July 1948	1 day	
2nd Session	28–30 January 1949	3 days	
3rd Session	29–30 December 1949	2 days	
4th Session	3–4 June 1951	2 days	
5th Session	27 May 1952	1 day	

== Members ==
Members of the Central Committee of the 5th Congress of the Communist Party of Yugoslavia
Name	5th	6th	Birth	PM	Death	Branch	Nationality	Gender	Ref.
Vera Aceva	New	Elected	1919	1940	2006	Macedonia	Macedonian	Female	
Spasenija Babović	Old	Elected	1907	1928	1977	Serbia	Serb	Female	
Vladimir Bakarić	New	Elected	1912	1933	1983	Croatia	Croat	Male	
Antun Biber	New	Elected	1910	1939	1995	Croatia	Croat	Male	
Jakov Blažević	Old	Elected	1912	1928	1996	Croatia	Croat	Male	
Duško Brkić	New	Expelled	1913	1939	2000	Croatia	Serb	Male	
Rodoljub Čolaković	Comeback	Elected	1900	1919	1983	Bosnia-Herzegovina	Serb	Male	
Uglješa Danilović	New	Elected	1913	1935	2003	Bosnia-Herzegovina	Serb	Male	
Milovan Đilas	Old	Elected	1911	1933	1995	Montenegro	Montenegrin	Male	
Ratomir Dugonjić	New	Elected	1916	1937	1987	Bosnia-Herzegovina	Serb	Male	
Strahil Gigov	New	Elected	1909	1929	1999	Macedonia	Macedonian	Male	
Ivan Gošnjak	New	Elected	1909	1933	1980	Croatia	Croat	Male	
Pavle Gregorić	New	Elected	1892	1921	1989	Croatia	Croat	Male	
Janez Hribar	New	Elected	1909	1939	1967	Slovenia	Slovene	Male	
Avdo Humo	New	Elected	1914	1941	1983	Bosnia-Herzegovina	Muslim	Male	
Vlado Janić	Old	Elected	1904	1931	1991	Croatia	Croat	Male	
Blažo Jovanović	Candidate	Elected	1907	1924	1976	Montenegro	Montenegrin	Male	
Isa Jovanović	New	Elected	1906	1928	1983	Serbia	Serb	Male	
Niko Jurinčić	New	Elected	1914	1935	1983	Bosnia-Herzegovina	Serb	Male	
Osman Karabegović	New	Elected	1911	1932	1996	Bosnia-Herzegovina	Muslim	Male	
Edvard Kardelj	Old	Elected	1910	1928	1979	Slovenia	Slovene	Male	
Boris Kidrič	Old	Elected	1912	1928	1953	Slovenia	Slovene	Male	
Lazar Koliševski	New	Elected	1914	1935	2000	Macedonia	Macedonian	Male	
Nikola Kovačević	New	Elected	1890	1920	1964	Montenegro	Montenegrin	Male	
Ivan Krajačić	New	Elected	1906	1934	1986	Croatia	Croat	Male	
Boris Kraigher	Candidate	Elected	1914	1934	1967	Slovenia	Slovene	Male	
Vicko Krstulović	Old	Elected	1905	1922	1988	Croatia	Croat	Male	
Voja Leković	New	Elected	1912	1939	1997	Serbia	Serb	Male	
Franc Leskošek	Old	Elected	1897	1926	1983	Slovenia	Slovene	Male	
Ivan Maček	New	Elected	1908	1930	1993	Slovenia	Slovene	Male	
Šefket Maglajlić	New	Elected	1912	1932	1983	Bosnia-Herzegovina	Muslim	Male	
Miha Marinko	Old	Elected	1900	1923	1983	Slovenia	Slovene	Male	
Moma Marković	New	Elected	1912	1933	1992	Serbia	Serb	Male	
Božidar Maslarić	New	Elected	1895	1920	1963	Croatia	Croat	Male	
Cvijetin Mijatović	New	Elected	1913	1934	1993	Bosnia-Herzegovina	Serb	Male	
Karlo Mrazović	New	Elected	1902	1927	1987	Croatia	Croat	Male	
Andrija Mugoša	New	Elected	1910	1933	2006	Montenegro	Montenegrin	Male	
Blagoje Nešković	New	Not	1907	1935	1984	Serbia	Serb	Male	
Đorđije Pajković	New	Elected	1917	1936	1980	Montenegro	Montenegrin	Male	
Slobodan Penezić	New	Elected	1918	1939	1964	Serbia	Serb	Male	
Dušan Petrović	New	Elected	1914	1935	1977	Serbia	Serb	Male	
Moša Pijade	Old	Elected	1890	1920	1957	Serbia	Serb /Jewish	Male	
Krsto Popivoda	Candidate	Elected	1910	1933	1988	Montenegro	Montenegrin	Male	
Milentije Popović	New	Elected	1913	1939	1971	Serbia	Serb	Male	
Vladimir Popović	Candidate	Elected	1914	1932	1972	Montenegro	Montenegrin	Male	
Đuro Pucar	Old	Elected	1899	1922	1979	Bosnia-Herzegovina	Serb	Male	
Dobrivoje Radosavljević	New	Elected	1915	1933	1984	Serbia	Serb	Male	
Aleksandar Ranković	Old	Elected	1909	1928	1983	Serbia	Serb	Male	
Ivan Regent	New	Elected	1884	1945	1967	Slovenia	Slovene	Male	
Dragutin Saili	New	Not	1899	1919	1968	Croatia	Croat	Male	
Đuro Salaj	Comeback	Elected	1899	1919	1958	Croatia	Croat	Male	
Vidoje Smilevski	New	Elected	1915	1940	1979	Macedonia	Macedonian	Male	
Petar Stambolić	New	Elected	1912	1935	2007	Serbia	Serb	Male	
Dragi Stamenković	New	Elected	1920	1937	2004	Serbia	Serb	Male	
Borko Temelkovski	New	Elected	1919	1939	2001	Macedonia	Macedonian	Male	
Josip Broz Tito	Old	Elected	1892	1920	1980	Not made public	Croat	Male	
Vida Tomšič	Old	Elected	1913	1934	1998	Slovenia	Slovene	Female	
Cvetko Uzunovski	New	Elected	1912	1937	1994	Macedonia	Macedonian	Male	
Jovan Veselinov	New	Elected	1906	1923	1982	Serbia	Serb	Male	
Veljko Vlahović	New	Elected	1914	1935	1975	Montenegro	Montenegrin	Male	
Todor Vujasinović	New	Not	1904	1930	1988	Bosnia-Herzegovina	Serb	Male	
Svetozar Vukmanović	Candidate	Elected	1912	1933	2000	Montenegro	Montenegrin	Male	
Veljko Zeković	New	Elected	1906	1934	1985	Montenegro	Montenegrin	Male	

=== Candidates ===
Candidates of the Central Committee of the 5th Congress of the Communist Party of Yugoslavia
Name	5th	6th	Birth	PM	Death	Branch	Nationality	Gender	Ref.
Bane Andreev	New	Expelled	1905	1923	1980	Macedonia	Macedonian	Male	
Ljupčo Arsov	New	Elected	1910	1940	1986	Macedonia	Macedonian	Male	
Viktor Avbelj	New	Elected	1914	1937	1993	Slovenia	Slovene	Male	
Mitar Bakić	New	Not	1908	1932	1960	Montenegro	Montenegrin	Male	
Aleš Bebler	New	Elected	1907	1929	1981	Slovenia	Slovene	Male	
Vlajko Begović	New	Elected	1905	1930	1989	Bosnia-Herzegovina	Serb	Male	
Marko Belinić	New	Elected	1911	1934	2004	Croatia	Croat	Male	
Zvonko Brkić	New	Elected	1913	1933	1965	Bosnia-Herzegovina	Muslim	Male	
Krste Crvenkovski	New	Elected	1921	1939	2001	Macedonia	Macedonian	Male	
Ilija Došen	New	Elected	1914	1936	1991	Bosnia-Herzegovina	Serb	Male	
Spaso Drakić	New	Not	1904	1935	1984	Montenegro	Montenegrin	Male	
Josip Hrnčević	New	Elected	1901	1933	1994	Croatia	Croat	Male	
Grga Jankes	New	Not	1906	1926	1974	Croatia	Croat	Male	
Savo Joksimović	New	Not	1913	1935	1980	Montenegro	Montenegrin	Male	
Pavle Jovićević	New	Not	1910	1931	1985	Serbia	Serb	Male	
Stane Kavčič	New	Elected	1909	1941	1987	Slovenia	Slovene	Male	
Rudi Kolak	New	Not	1918	1941	2004	Bosnia-Herzegovina	Croat	Male	
Slavko Komar	New	Elected	1918	1940	2012	Croatia	Croat	Male	
Pašaga Mandžić	New	Elected	1907	1929	1975	Bosnia-Herzegovina	Serb	Male	
Veljko Mičunović	New	Elected	1916	1934	1982	Montenegro	Montenegrin	Male	
Ljubinka Milosavljević	New	Not	1917	1936	?	Serbia	Serb	Female	
Miloš Minić	New	Elected	1915	1936	2000	Serbia	Serb	Male	
Mara Naceva	New	Not	1920	1939	2013	Macedonia	Macedonian	Female	
Naum Naumovski	New	Elected	1920	1940	1960	Macedonia	Macedonian	Male	
Milijan Neoričić	New	Elected	1922	1941	2014	Serbia	Serb	Male	
Džavid Nimani	New	Elected	1919	1941	2000	Serbia	Albanian	Male	
Puniša Perović	New	Elected	1911	1933	1984	Montenegro	Montenegrin	Male	
Nikola Petrović	New	Not	1910	1932	?	Serbia	Serb	Male	
Mile Počuča	New	Elected	1899	1923	1980	Croatia	Croat	Male	
Jože Potrč	New	Elected	1903	1924	1963	Slovenia	Slovene	Male	
Ante Roje	New	Not	1914	1939	1982	Croatia	Croat	Male	
Janko Rudolf	New	Not	1914	1941	1997	Slovenia	Slovene	Male	
Vlado Šegrt	New	Elected	1907	1931	1991	Bosnia-Herzegovina	Serb	Male	
Lidija Šentjurc	New	Elected	1911	1932	2000	Slovenia	Slovene	Female	
Pal Šoti	New	Elected	1916	1936	1993	Serbia	Hungarian	Male	
Svetislav Stefanović	New	Elected	1910	1928	1980	Serbia	Serb	Male	
Velimir Stojnić	New	Elected	1916	1936	1990	Bosnia-Herzegovina	Serb	Male	
Mihailo Švabić	New	Elected	1919	1938	2002	Serbia	Serb	Male	
Rade Žigić	New	Expelled	1909	1939	1954	Croatia	Serb	Male	
Boris Ziherl	New	Elected	1910	1930	1976	Slovenia	Slovene	Male	
Savo Zlatić	New	Expelled	1912	1934	2007	Croatia	Croat	Male	
Radovan Zogović	New	Expelled	1907	1934	1986	Montenegro	Montenegrin	Male	

== Bibliography ==
- Bechev, Dimitar (2019). Historical Dictionary of North Macedonia. Rowman & Littlefield Publishers. ISBN 9781538119617.
- Hetemi, Atdhe (2020). Student Movements for the Republic of Kosovo: 1968, 1981 and 1997. Springer International Publishing.
- Janković, Slavko, ed. (1957). Ko je ko u Jugoslaviji: biografski podaci o jugoslovenskim savremenicima [Who's Who in Yugoslavia: Biographical Information About Yugoslav Contemporaries] (in Serbo-Croatian). Vol. 3. Izd. "Sedme sile".
- Joksimović, Milan; Rajović, Radošin (1970). Jugoslovenski savremenici: Ko je ko u Jugoslaviji [Yugoslav Contemporaries: Who's Who in Yugoslavia] (in Serbo-Croatian). Hronometar.
- Marković, Dragan; Kržavac, Savo (1985). Zašto su smenjivani [Why Were They Replaced?] (in Serbo-Croatian). Partizanska knjiga. ISBN 978-3-030-54951-0.
- Neal, Fred Warner (March 1957). "The Communist Party in Yugoslavia". The American Political Science Review. 1 (51): 88–111. doi:10.2307/1951773. JSTOR 1951773.
- Neal, Fred Warner (1958). Titoism in Action: The Reforms in Yugoslavia After 1948. University of California Press. ISBN 978-0-520-35044-1.
- Nešović, Slobodan (1977). Diplomatska igra oko Jugoslavije 1944–1945. Stvarnost. ISBN 978-3-030-54951-0.
- Rajak, Svetozar (2011). Yugoslavia and the Soviet Union in the Early Cold War: Reconciliation, comradeship, confrontation, 1953–1957. Routledge. ISBN 978-0-415-38074-4.
- Rusinow, Dennison (1978). The Yugoslav Experiment 1948–1974. University of California Press. ISBN 0-520-03730-8.
- Nešović, Slobodan (1981). Stvaranje nove Jugoslavije: 1941–1945 [Creation of the New Yugoslavia: 1941–1945] (in Serbo-Croatian). Sarajevo: Mladost. OCLC 444838775.
- Staff writer, ed. (1982). Politički i poslovni imenik [Political and Business Directory] (in Serbo-Croatian). Vol. 3. Tanjug.
- Staff writer, ed. (1948). Odluke V. kongresa Komunističke Partije Jugoslavije [Decisions of the Fifth Congress of the Communist Party of Yugoslavia] (in Serbo-Croatian). Kultura.
- Staff writer, ed. (1953). VI kongres Komunističke partije Jugoslavije: 2-7 novembra 1952: stenografske beleške [VI Congress of the Communist Party of Yugoslavia] (in Serbo-Croatian). Kultura.
- Staff writer, ed. (1965). VIII Kongres Saveza Komunista Jugoslavije Beograd, 7–13. decembra 1964.: stenog̈rafske beleške [VIII Congress of the Union of Communists of Yugoslavia Belgrade, 7–13 December 1964: shorthand notes] (in Serbo-Croatian). Vol. 3. Kultura.
- Staff writer, ed. (1966). Svjetski almanah [World Almanac] (in Serbo-Croatian). Vol. 4. Novinsko izdavačko poduzeće.
- Lewytzkyj, Borys; Stroynowski, Juliusz, eds. (1978). Who's Who in the Socialist Countries. K. G. Saur Verlag. ISBN 3-7940-3017-6.
- Stroynowski, Juliusz, ed. (1989a). Who's Who in the Socialist Countries of Europe: A–H. K. G. Saur Verlag. ISBN 3-598-10719-6.
- Stroynowski, Juliusz, ed. (1989b). Who's Who in the Socialist Countries of Europe: I–O. K. G. Saur Verlag. ISBN 3-598-10719-6.
- Stroynowski, Juliusz, ed. (1989c). Who's Who in the Socialist Countries of Europe: P–Z. K. G. Saur Verlag. ISBN 3-598-10719-6.
- Tito, Josip Broz (1982b). Damjanović, Pero; Vujošević, Ubavka (eds.). Sabrana djela [Selected Works] (in Serbo-Croatian). Vol. 13. Komunist.
- Zalar, Charles, ed. (1961). Yugoslav Communism: A Critical Study. United States Government Printing Office. Archived from the original on 11 June 2023.
- Živkovíc, Dusan; Apostolski, Mihailo; Kačavenda, Petar, eds. (1982). National Heroes of Yugoslavia [Narodni heroji Jugoslavije] (in Serbo-Croatian). Narodna knjiga.
