= Socialist self-management =

Social and economic model

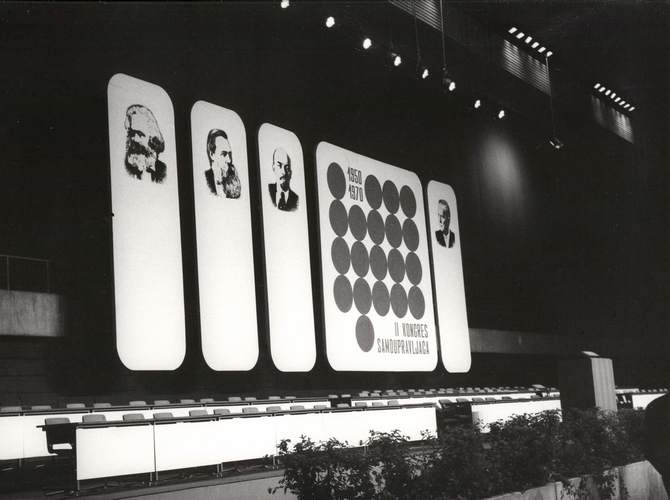
The Second Congress of Self-Managers held in Sarajevo, 1971

Socialist self-management or self-governing socialism was a form of workers' self-management used as a social and economic model formulated by the League of Communists of Yugoslavia. It was instituted by law in 1950 and lasted in the Socialist Federal Republic of Yugoslavia until 1990, just prior to its breakup in 1992.

The main goal was to move the managing of companies into the hands of workers and to separate the management from the state and it was further codified by the 1974 Yugoslav Constitution. It was also meant to demonstrate the viability of a "third way" between the capitalist United States and the socialist Soviet Union.

Based on market-based allocation, social ownership of the means of production and self-management within firms, this system replaced Yugoslavia's former Soviet-type central planning.

== History ==
As President of Yugoslavia, Josip Broz Tito prided himself on Yugoslavia's independence from the Soviet Union, with Yugoslavia never accepting full membership in Comecon and Tito's open rejection of many aspects of Stalinism as the most obvious manifestations of this independence. The Soviets and their satellite states often accused Yugoslavia of Trotskyism and social democracy, charges loosely based on Tito's form of workers' self-management and the theory of associated labor (profit sharing policies and worker-owned industries initiated by him, Milovan Đilas and Edvard Kardelj in 1950). It was in these things that the Soviet leadership accused Tito's Yugoslavia of harboring the seeds of council communism or even corporatism.

In 1948, the Communist Party of Yugoslavia held its Fifth Congress. The meeting was held shortly after Stalin accused Tito of being a nationalist and moving to the right, branding the latter's heresy Titoism. This resulted in a break with the Soviet Union known as the Informbiro period. Initially the Yugoslav communists, despite the break with Stalin, remained as hardline as before but soon began to pursue a policy of independent socialism that experimented with the self-management of workers in state-run enterprises, with decentralization and other departures from the Soviet model of a communist state.

Under the influence of reformers such as Boris Kidrič and Milovan Đilas, Yugoslavia experimented with ideas of workers' self-management where workers influenced the policies of the factories in which they worked and shared a portion of any surplus revenue. This resulted in a change in the party's role in society from holding a monopoly of power to being an ideological leader. As a result, the party name and the names of the regional branches respectively were changed to the League of Communists of Yugoslavia (Savez komunista Jugoslavije, SKJ) in 1952 during its Sixth Congress.

== Criticism ==
By 1989, Ante Marković's reform government abolished self-management. At this time, the country had crippling foreign debt, structural adjustment measures enforced by the International Monetary Fund, and economic collapse amplified the centrifugal pulls of foreign markets.

Contrary to the intended mission of self-management, that being transitioning the control of management into the hands of the workers, authority within enterprises often concentrated in the hands of white-collar workers and the managerial class regardless. Although formally controlled through workers' councils, business and managerial decisions often were delegated to those who already had the experience.

== See also ==
- Socialism with a human face
