= Congress of the League of Communists =

Congress meetings of the League of Communists may refer to:

- Congress of the League of Communists of Yugoslavia, the highest forum of the party
  - Congress of the League of Communists of Bosnia and Herzegovina, the highest forum of this LCY branch
  - Congress of the League of Communists of Croatia, the highest forum of this LCY branch
  - Congress of the League of Communists of Macedonia, the highest forum of this LCY branch
  - Congress of the League of Communists of Montenegro, the highest forum of this LCY branch
  - Congress of the League of Communists of Serbia, the highest forum of this LCY branch
