= 6th Congress of the League of Communists of Yugoslavia =

Political event in Yugoslavia

Overview
- Type: Highest forum
- Presiding organ: Working Presidency

Meeting place
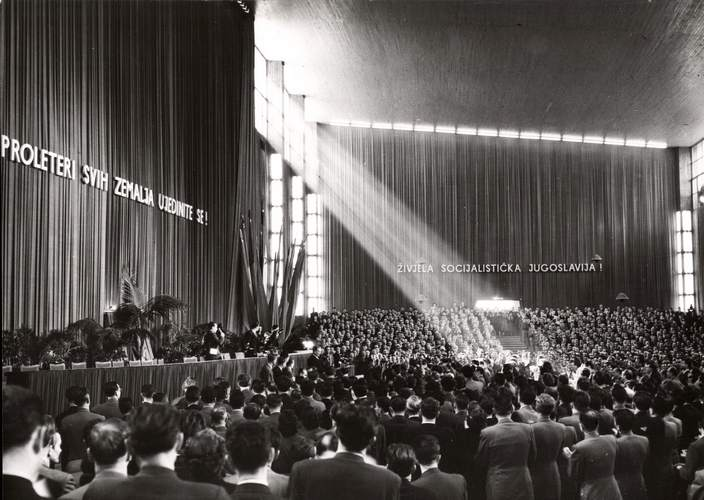
- Zagreb, FPR Yugoslavia

The Communist Party of Yugoslavia (CPY) convened the supreme body for its 6th Congress in Zagreb on 2–7 November 1952. It was attended by 2,022 delegates representing 779,382 party members. The 6th Congress sought to discuss new policies, first of all in reaction to the Yugoslav–Soviet split and Yugoslav rapprochement with the United States. The congress is considered the peak of liberalisation of Yugoslav political life in the 1950s. The Congress also renamed the party the League of Communists of Yugoslavia.

New policies were adopted, while old policies were replaced. The congress was particularly critical of bureaucracy, which was denounced as a remnant of Stalinism. In this respect, Josip Broz Tito, the General Secretary of the party's Central Committee, called for gradual "withering away of the state". The local party organisations were instructed to reorganise territorially by electoral districts. They were given greater decision-making autonomy, but their role was changed from being a virtual administrative arm of the government to a part in which they would be used to persuade and educate instead of direct. A decision was made to separate the party from the central government, and party secretaries would no longer have corresponding functions in the central government. The Congress also declared Marxism incompatible with the performance or attendance of religious events.

Workers' self-management was formally approved by the 6th Congress. This policy change regarding the country's decentralisation led to a wider discussion about the nature of Yugoslav federalism in its immediate aftermath. In response, constitutional amendments were enacted in 1953 to implement the approved changes in the political system. However, some of the 6th Congress' adopted resolutions were reversed when relations with the Soviet Union were normalised. The resolutions and strategies adopted by the congress also led to a conflict between efforts aimed at further decentralisation and empowering Yugoslav constituent republics on the one hand and work to increase Yugoslav unity on the other. The principal authors of the documents adopted by the congress were Edvard Kardelj and Milovan Đilas. The latter thought that the liberalisation policies should be reinforced and extended. This brought him into conflict with Tito, removing Đilas from leading positions in the state and party.

== Background ==
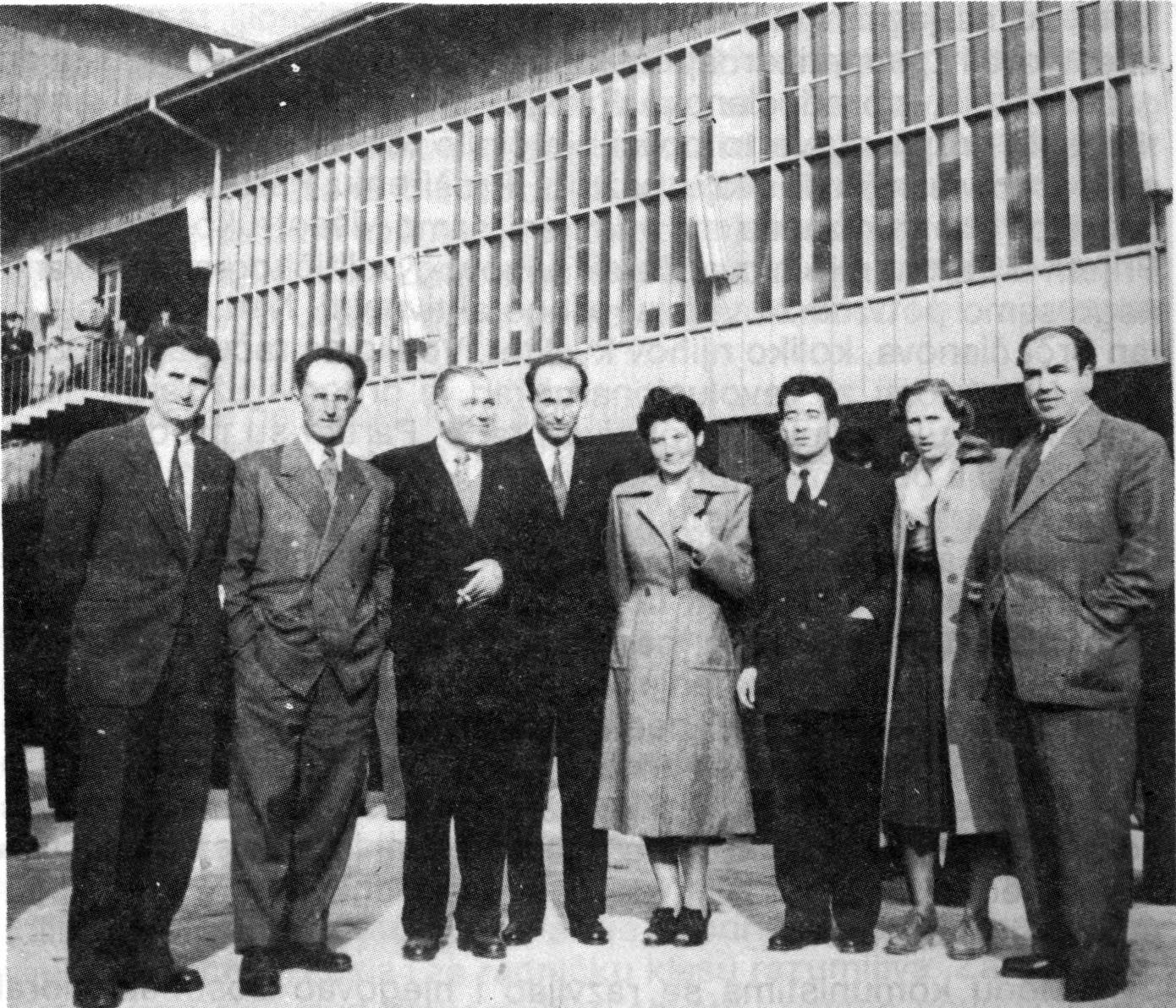
Left to right: Đuro Đurašković, Hasan Brkić, Isa Jovanović, Dane Olbina, Lepa Perović, Nisim Albahari, Jovanka Cović and Mladen Knežević at the 6th Congress of the Communist Party of Yugoslavia.

The Communist Party of Yugoslavia (CPY) was a political party established in the Kingdom of Yugoslavia in 1919. By the end of the next year, it was banned and forced to function covertly and abroad. Following the invasion of Yugoslavia by the Axis powers in 1941, it organised and led Partisan resistance, The resistance grew increasingly successful and received recognition from the Allies. Following the 1944 power-sharing agreement concluded with the Yugoslav government-in-exile, the CPY led the formation of the Provisional Government of the Democratic Federal Yugoslavia in March 1945. Later that year, the CPY won the 1945 Yugoslavian parliamentary election boycotted by the opposition. By 1947, the CPY moved to suppress any political opposition.

In 1948, the Yugoslav–Soviet split occurred. The fifth congress of the CPY, in reaction to the split, reaffirmed its support for Josip Broz Tito's leadership, and he was reelected at the 1st Plenary Session of the Central Committee of the 5th Congress. Nonetheless, the fifth congress reaffirmed its opposition to the capitalism of the Western Bloc. In the immediate aftermath of the fifth congress of the CPY, Yugoslav relations with the West deteriorated, particularly burdened by the dispute over the Free Territory of Trieste. As a result, it is said that the CPY adopted a very rigid position towards the Soviet Union and its leader Joseph Stalin. Hilde Katrine Haug has described the Yugoslav position as more Stalinist than the one held by Stalin.

Yugoslavia was compelled to ask the United States for economic assistance in the summer of 1948 due to the closure of foreign trade with the countries of the Eastern Bloc. The United States Government cautiously approved the request, wishing to score a Cold War victory over the Soviet Union. By 1949–50, the scope of American aid increased to encompass loans and large grants. By 1951, faced with the prospect of a Soviet invasion, Yugoslavia joined the Mutual Defense Assistance Program and began receiving US military aid as well.

Given the circumstances and the ideological aspect of the Yugoslav–Soviet split, the CPY found it necessary to differentiate the Yugoslav political system from the Soviet one. Since the CPY labelled the USSR undemocratic, it was necessary to devise a new communist approach to governing. A unique communist project was started through several actions. In late 1949, workers' councils were introduced and complemented by workers' self-management in June 1950. Earlier insistence on the unitary state was questioned and criticised as a dangerous manifestation of Stalinism. This approach led to ideological flexibility where even longstanding party dogmas were questioned. In the early 1950s, the CPY introduced the concept of "struggle of opinions" to refer to such exchanges of ideas amid the liberalisation of the economy and administration. Nonetheless, even though the self-management policy gave state-owned enterprises and their municipal-level CPY patrons the freedom to decide on enterprise-level economic matters, funding of those enterprises remained highly centralised. By mid-1952, the CPY leadership wanted to reaffirm its commitment to workers' self-management and formally announce its intention to begin separating the CPY apparatus from the government offices. According to Aleksandar Ranković, the principal objective of the upcoming CPY congress was to align the party with the reforms which took place in the preceding years.

== Decisions ==
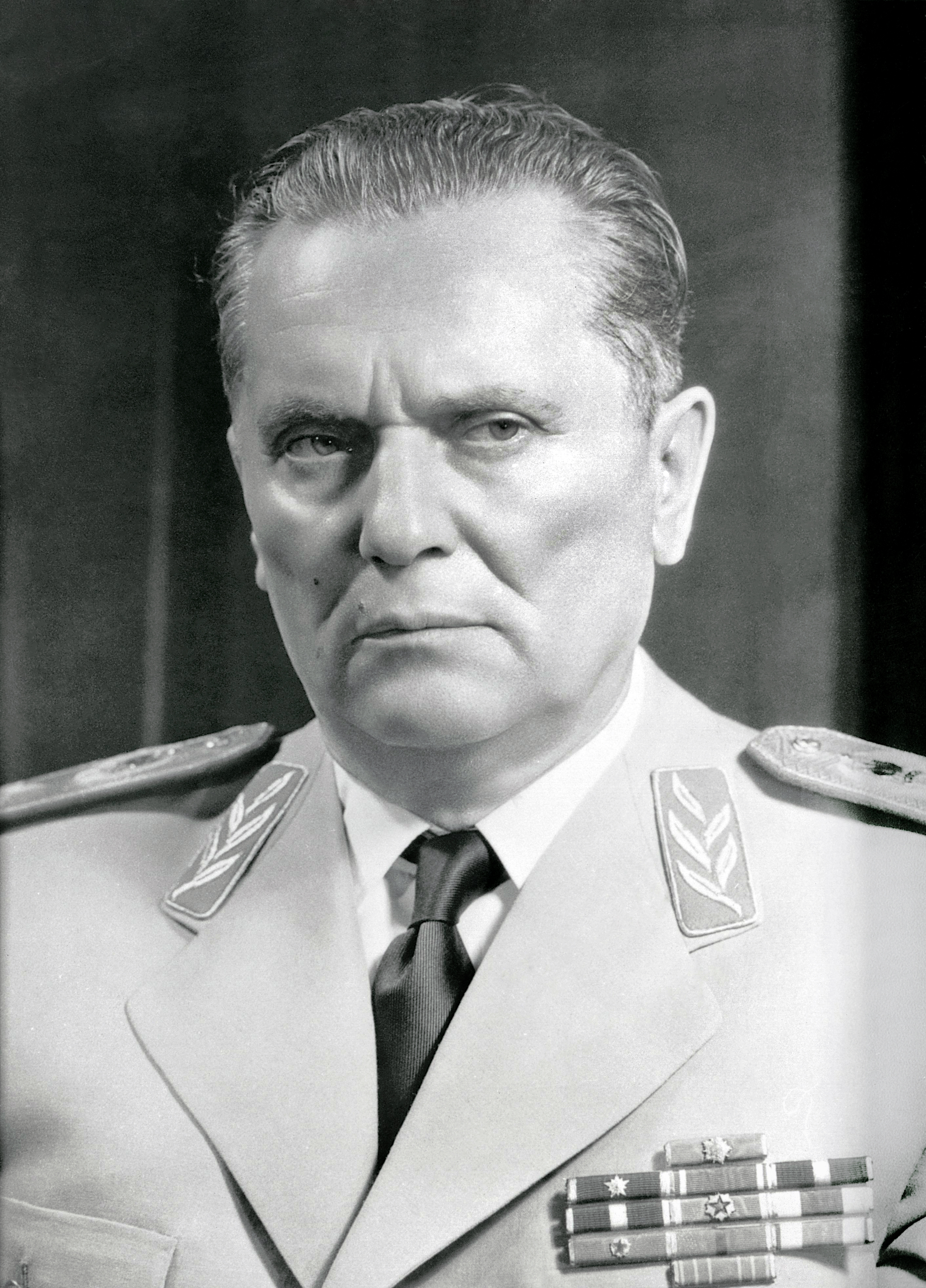
Josip Broz Tito was re-elected General Secretary of the League of Communists of Yugoslavia in 1952.

Originally scheduled for 19 October 1952, the CPY 6th Congress convened on 2 November in Zagreb. The six-day event was attended by 2,022 delegates representing 779,382 CPY members. The main venue was the then site of the Zagreb Fair, specifically the building which later became home of the Nikola Tesla Technical Museum. The tone of the congress was set by Tito. In his speech, he criticised Soviet imperialism and Russian chauvinism, and declared the CPY went down the correct path of decentralisation, democratic economic management, and "withering away of the state".

At the congress, the leadership declared its intention to change the party's role in society. The purpose was to change the party role from director to educator by influencing communists and everyday political and societal life. Another approved proposal was to reduce the central role played by the state bureaucracy. Furthermore, bureaucratism was determined as a significant problem as a remnant of Stalinism. In pursuit of removing the party from the central role in the government, the Congress decided that party secretaries would no longer have corresponding positions in the government. The congress declared that this would leave the central party apparatus to pursue the development of policies and ideology and act primarily through persuasion.

The congress also endorsed the policy of workers' self-management, and instructed the party members to control the workers' councils through persuasion instead of intimidation. At the same time, the congress took steps to restrict the investment decision-making autonomy of the workers' councils and make it more difficult to replace their company managers. These were responses to frequent replacements of company managers and instances of misappropriation of investment funds by the workers' councils manipulated by local party officials. On the other hand, the local-level basic party organisations were granted greater autonomy, although it was explicitly noted that the autonomy would not allow them full independence. Their previous role as an administrative arm of the government was terminated as they were no longer expected to transmit government instructions on enterprise-level economic and administrative decisions. Instead, the basic organisations were given the educational role and told to reorganise so that their one basic party organisation would serve one electoral district.

To make the change more apparent, the CPY changed its name. At the congress, Tito proposed to change the party name to "League of Communists of Yugoslavia" (Savez komunista Jugoslavije, SKJ). The name was inspired by the Communist League, an organisation that existed from 1847 to 1852, of which the likes of Karl Marx, Friedrich Engels, and Karl Schapper were activists. Milovan Đilas claimed that it was he who originally proposed the new name. Similarly, the Politburo's name was changed to "Executive Committee".

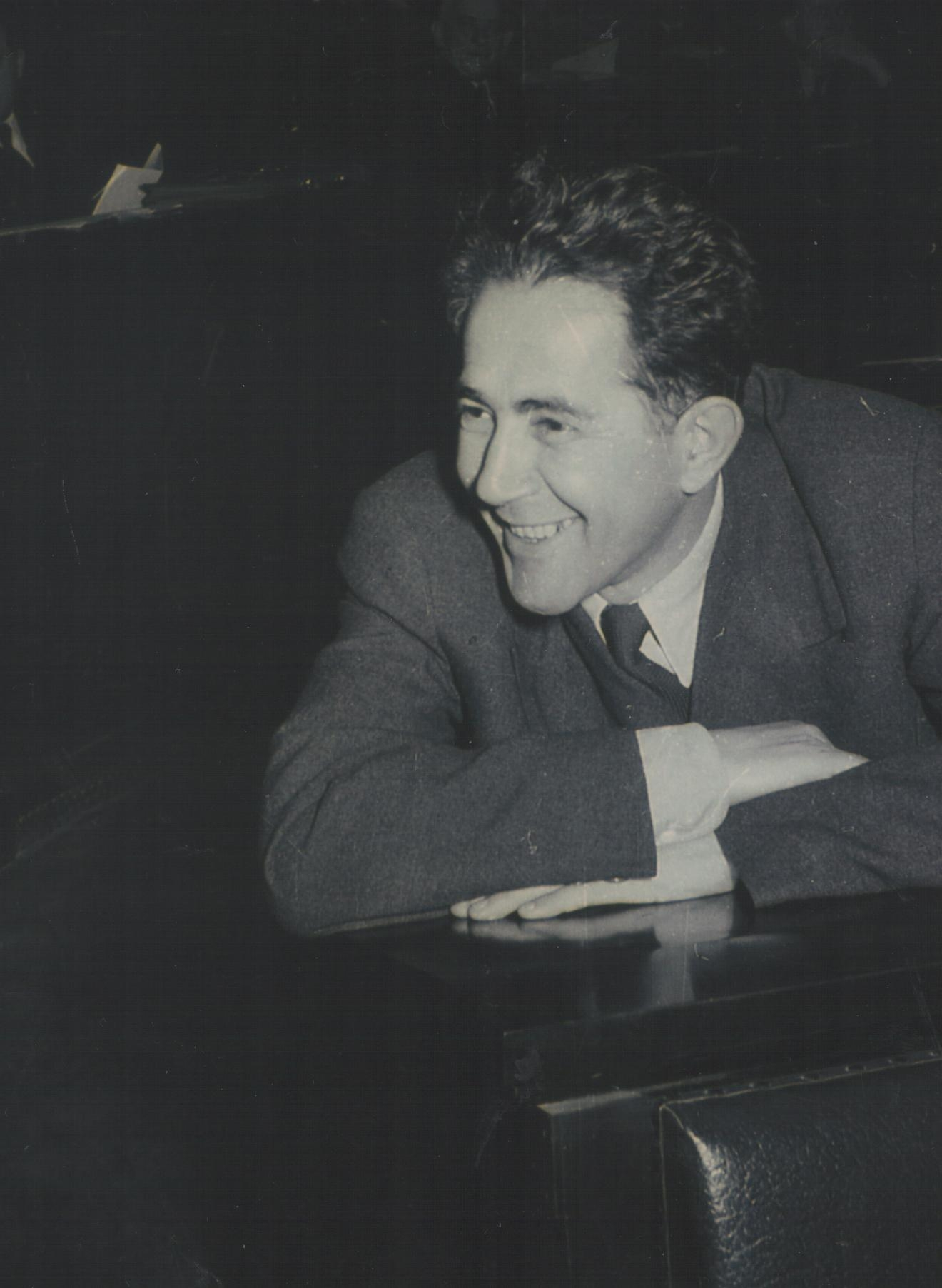
Due to his authorship of much of adopted materials, the 6th congress of the CPY is sometimes referred to as [Milovan] Đilas's congress.

The 6th Congress elected 109 individuals to the Central Committee, 13 to the Executive Committee, and six to the Executive Committee Secretariat. In turn, the Central Committee unanimously reelected Tito as the General Secretary of the SKJ Central Committee at its first meeting. Besides Tito, the Executive Committee consisted of Ranković, Đilas, Edvard Kardelj, Boris Kidrič, Moša Pijade, Ivan Gošnjak, Svetozar Vukmanović, Đuro Salaj, Đuro Pucar, Lazar Koliševski, Franc Leskošek, and Vladimir Bakarić. The congress also concluded that Marxism goes against any religious beliefs. The party charter was amended to note that SKJ membership was incompatible with the performance of religious ceremonies or attending religious events. Kardelj and Đilas were the principal authors of the documents adopted at the congress. Due to the volume of congress materials prepared by the latter, the 6th Congress is also referred to in some sources as Đilas's congress.

The 6th Congress was the high point of liberalisation in Yugoslavia in the 1950s. The party charter was also amended at the congress, with decentralisation and socialist democracy reemphasised. However, the consensus reached by the 6th Congress would prove short-lived, and an ideological conflict would soon occur. One camp, formed around Đilas, Pijade and possibly Blagoje Nešković, favoured a faster pace of decentralisation of the party and the country. Their opponents rallied around Kardelj, Ranković, Gošnjak, and Kidrič, who advocated a more cautious pace. At the time of the congress, Tito was correctly rumoured to favour the latter group's view. The 6th Congress also signalled a decline in critical discourse. Namely, as the SKJ viewed the adopted changes as a formalisation of the reforms leading up to the congress, its membership was cautioned to refrain from straying from the new party line. Even though criticism of the SKJ was allowed, limits of the criticism were imposed.

== Aftermath ==
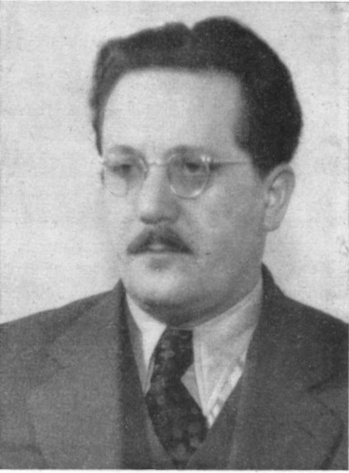
Edvard Kardelj contributed to texts adopted by the 6th congress of the CPY.

Within a year of the congress, complaints of improper implementation of adopted congress policies were made. Lower-ranking party officials continued to accept superior-level instructions without exchanging opinions. In other instances, party organisations interpreted the policy as a call for passivity and an opportunity to work less. Also, there were examples where lower-level party bodies interpreted the new policies as giving them the option of ignoring instructions from above, avoiding meetings, or performing their financial obligations. Seeking to reduce bureaucracy, lower-level party officials consolidated the functions of smaller organisations (known as party cells) into larger local and municipal districts. The drive to reduce bureaucracy reduced the number of SKJ professional party officials to 369 by late 1954.

The policy change also spurred a debate on the Yugoslav federal system – the role of constituent republics and the status of various peoples in Yugoslavia. The discussion was framed around the dilemma of achieving decentralisation and guaranteeing equality of different nations comprising the Yugoslav Federation and increasing Yugoslav unity on the other. The SKJ deemed the national question solved by establishing the Yugoslav Federation in 1945, and it did not anticipate conflict in relations among constituent republics stemming from the national question. Instead, the 6th Congress sought to promote further rapprochement between the nations. The SKJ portrayed the diverse national heritages of the peoples of Yugoslavia as components of a shared Yugoslav culture while avoiding all forms of forced assimilation. While changes to the political system approved by the congress were formally enshrined in legislation through 1953 Yugoslav constitutional amendments, by 1954, Kardelj held that the existing constitution was suffering from mechanical use of Soviet ideas on federalism. While comparatively minor in importance at the time, the issues would be revisited in the late 1960s and early 1970s and lead to the adoption of a new Yugoslav constitution.

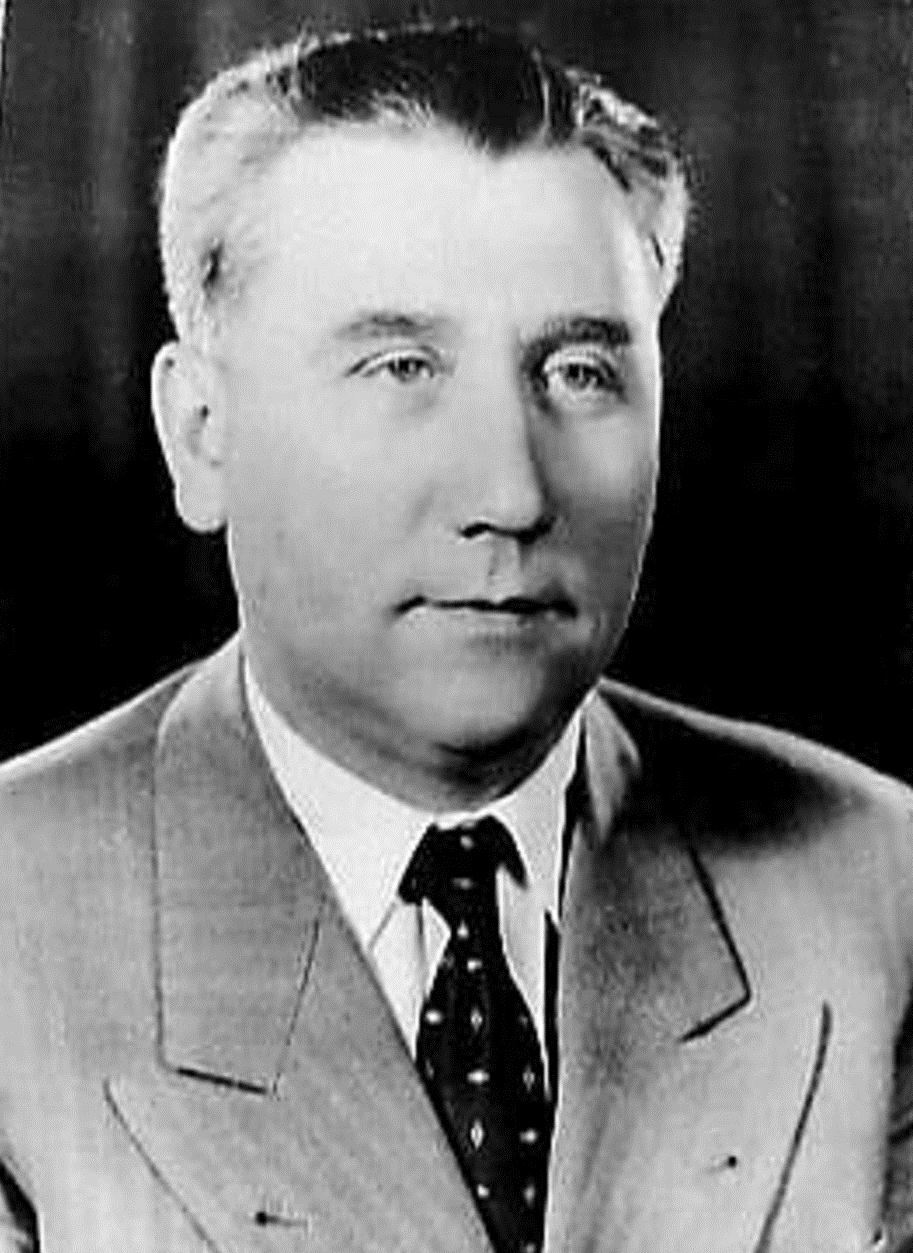
After the death of Stalin, Tito and Aleksandar Ranković (pictured) worked to roll back or slow down reforms.

Stalin's death in 1953 substantially reduced the Soviet threat to Yugoslavia, taking away a significant reason for the far-reaching extent of the reforms embraced by the SKJ. In particular, Tito was concerned about maintaining the leading position of the SKJ in society, fearing that adopting Western ideas might undermine the party's dominance. He was also suspicious of the Western intentions towards Yugoslavia as the Trieste Crisis remained unresolved. In June 1953, Tito and Ranković organised the 2nd Plenary Session of the Central Committee at the Brijuni Islands. There, the Central Committee instituted new rules virtually reversing many elements of the policy adopted at the 6th Congress. Most significantly, the committee began to backtrack on the congress's plans for a reduction in the SKJ's role in government and for a gradual "withering away of the state". Furthermore, the group favouring a slower pace of reforms won Tito's favour and prevailed.

Đilas, on the other hand, held that the resolutions of the 6th Congress did not go sufficiently far. He wrote a series of articles for publication in the party newspaper Borba, effectively advocating the introduction of a multi-party system. The party leadership reacted by expelling him in January 1954. The removal of Đilas was interpreted as a prerequisite for improving relations with the USSR. Months later, the Yugoslav leadership commended Stalin's immediate successor Georgy Malenkov. In May 1955, when Nikita Khrushchev and Nikolai Bulganin visited Belgrade, Yugoslavia and the USSR agreed to rebuild their relations on new grounds, marking the end of the Informbiro period.

Tito discovered he could maximise his negotiating power by keeping Yugoslavia neutral in the Cold War between the United States and the Soviet Union. Therefore, regardless of the rapprochement with the Soviets, Yugoslavs informed the United States their policy towards the West would remain unchanged. In turn, the American officials were confident that Yugoslavia would not become allied with the Soviet Union.
