= National meetings of the League of Communists of Yugoslavia =

National meetings of the League of Communists of Yugoslavia may refer to:

- Conference of the League of Communists of Yugoslavia, an ad-hoc organ convened in special circumstances
- Congress of the League of Communists of Yugoslavia, the highest forum of the party
