= 13th Congress of the League of Communists of Yugoslavia =

Political event in Yugoslavia

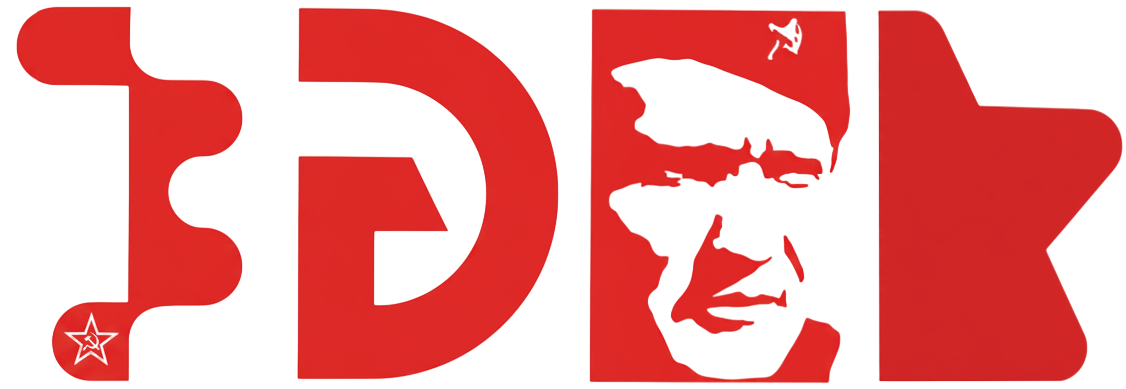
- Logo of 13th Congress of the League of Communists of Yugoslavia in 1986

Overview
- Type: Highest forum
- Convenor: 14th Session of the Central Committee of the 12th Congress
- Presiding organ: Working Presidency
- Electoral organ: Commission for the Verification of the Election
- Elected bodies: Central Committee; Statutory Commission; Supervisory Commission

Meeting place
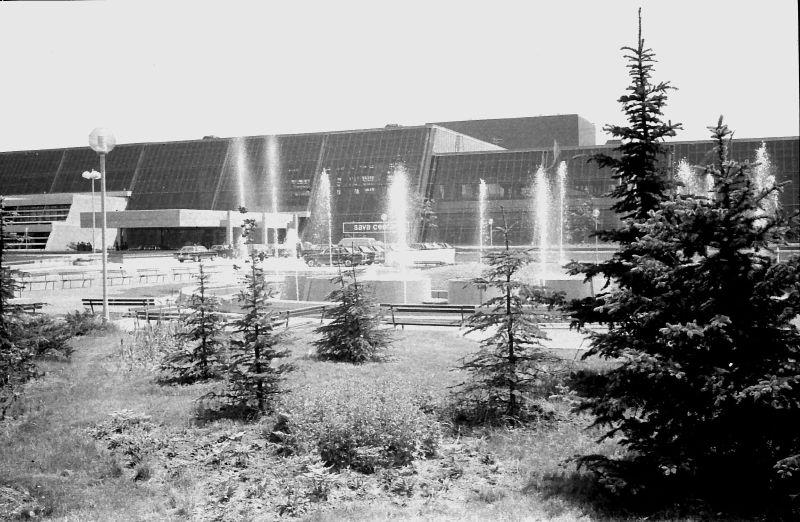
- Sava Centar, Beograd; SR Serbia, SFR Yugoslavia

The League of Communists of Yugoslavia (LCY) convened the highest forum for its 13th Congress on 25–28 June 1986. It was attended by delegates from all the LCY branches. The Congress received numerous congratulatory messages from parties and movements from many countries and over a thousand telegrams from domestic labour organisations.

== Background ==
This conference was notable for the members elected or confirmed. The 13th Congress aimed to bring to the forefront a new generation of politicians to replace the party's old cadre. Instead of seeking agreement within the national framework, the fundamental split in the form of the Yugoslav state was rather confirmed, where the Western republics gravitated towards a more liberal model, while Serbia held centralist and conservative positions.

== Sources ==
- Pirjevec, Jože (2000). Jože Pirjevec: Jugoslavija 1918-1992. Nastanek, razvoj in razpad Karadjordjevićeve in Titove Jugoslavije [Yugoslavia 1918-1992: the creation, development and collapse of Karadjordjević's and Tito's Yugoslavia] (in Slovenian) (1 ed.). Prague: Argo. ISBN 80-7203-277-1.
- Cohen, Lenard J (1993). Broken Bonds: The Disintegration of Yugoslavia. Boulder; San Francisco; Oxford: Westview Press. ISBN 9780367096007. OCLC 1124559654.
- Ramet, Sabrina P. (2005). Balkan Babel: The breakup of Yugoslavia from Tito's death to Milošević's fall (1–4 ed.). Zagreb: Alinea. ISBN 9780813339054.
- Silber, Laura; Little, Allan (1996). Smrt Jugoslavije [Death of Yugoslavia] (in Serbo-Croatian). Opatija: Otokar Keršovani. ISBN 953-153-028-9.
- Istorija Saveza komunista Jugoslavije [History of the League of Communists of Yugoslavia] (in Serbo-Croatian). Belgrade: Komunist; Narodna knjiga; Rad. 1985.
