= 5th Congress of the Communist Party of Yugoslavia =

Political event in Yugoslavia

5th Congress of the League of Communists of Yugoslavia

Overview
- Type: Highest forum
- Presiding organ: Working Presidency

Meeting place
- Belgrade, Yugoslavia

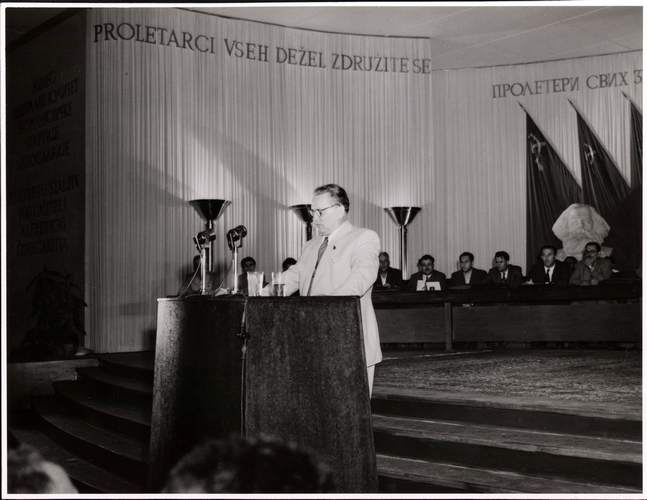
Tito's speech at the 5th Congress of the Communist Party of Yugoslavia.

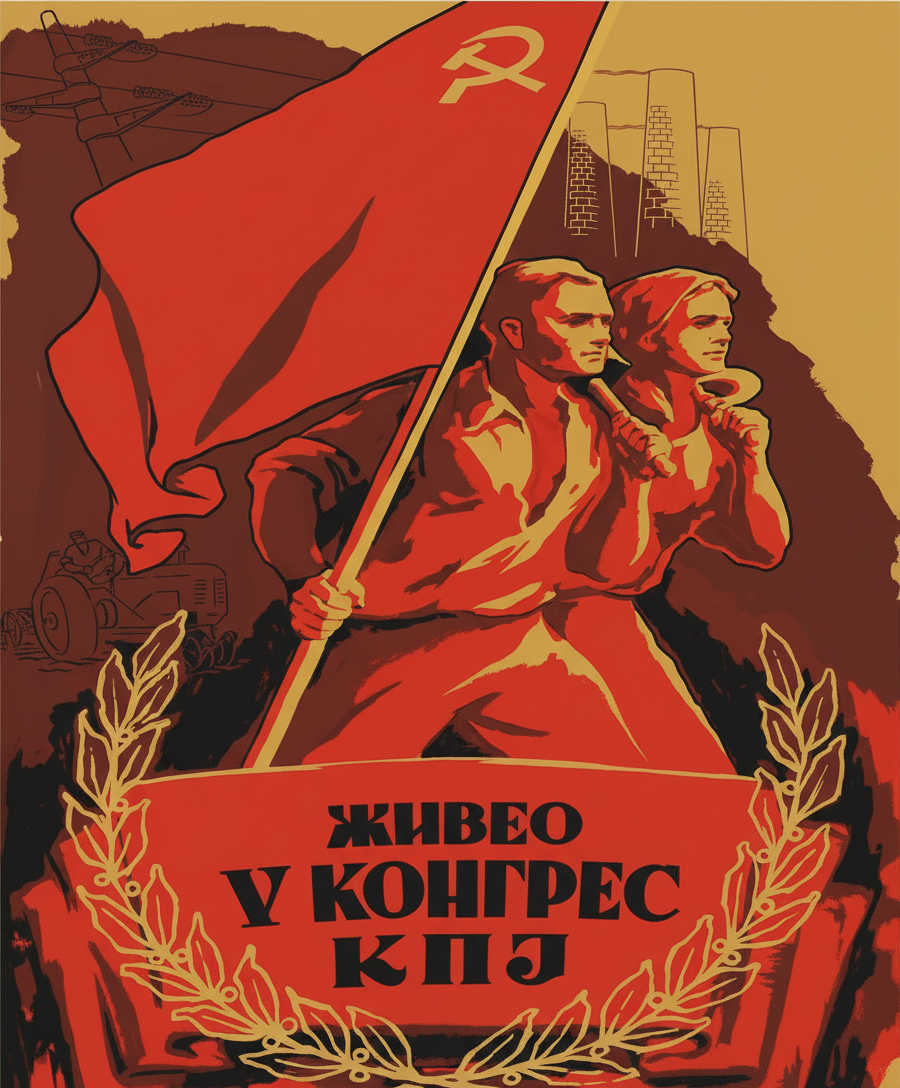
Poster of 5th Congress of the League of Communists of Yugoslavia in 1948

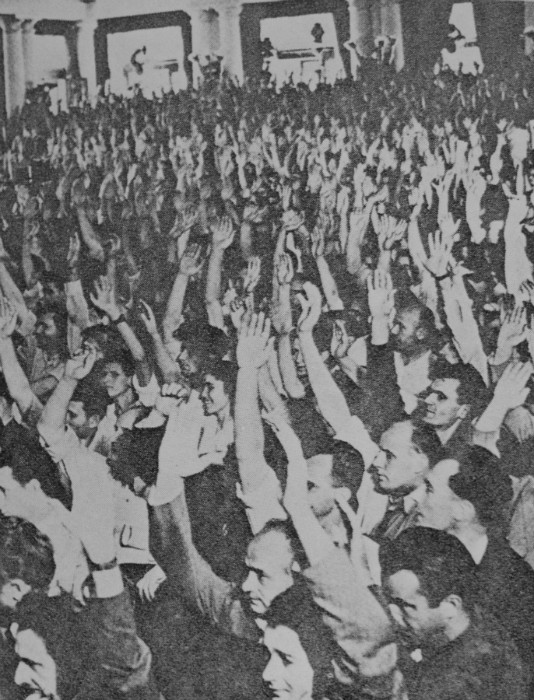
Delegated vote to give support to the leadership of the Communist Party of Yugoslavia.

The Communist Party of Yugoslavia (CPY) convened the supreme body for its 5th Congress in Belgrade on 21–28 July 1948. 2,344 delegates, out of the 468,175 CPY members, attended the congress.

== Background ==
It was the first Congress of Yugoslav communists held after World War II, takeover of power in the country and establishment of the SFR Yugoslavia, but also the first major gathering of Yugoslav communists held since the 5th Territorial Conference, held in October 1940. Although 20 years had passed since the previous meeting, and 8 years have passed since the 5th Territorial Conference, the main reason for conveying the Congress was the "Resolution of the Informbiro", adopted by Soviet–dominated Cominform on 28 June 1948 in Bucharest, Romania.

== The Congress ==
The main topic of the Congress was the "Resolution of the Informbiro" and supporting the Yugoslav leadership in resisting Cominform. Direct radio broadcasting and extensive press coverage gave the broadest publicity to the Congress. Reports to the Congress were submitted by Josip Broz Tito, Aleksandar Ranković, Milovan Đilas, Edvard Kardelj, Boris Kidrič, Moša Pijade and Blagoje Nešković.

The Congress gave political support to the Central Committee in "defending the independence" of Yugoslavia. The decision was made unanimously, and the party's unity was "confirmed". The Congress also adopted the "Resolution on the position of the Communist Party of Yugoslavia towards Cominform", which concluded that the decisions of Cominform were inaccurate and unjust. Still, it was emphasized that the Central Committee should do everything to overcome the conflict.

At the end of the Congress, a new Central Committee consisting of 63 members, and a new Politburo consisting of 9 members, were elected. Josip Broz Tito was re-elected as the General Secretary of the Party Central Committee.

== See also ==
- Tito–Stalin Split
- Informbiro period

== Sources ==
- Pregled Istorije Saveza komunista Jugoslavije. "Institut za izučavanje radničkog pokreta", Beograd 1963 godina.
- Hronologija Radničkog pokreta i SKJ 1919–1979. "Institut za savremenu istoriju" Beograd i "Narodna knjiga" Beograd, 1980. godina.
- Istorija Saveza komunista Jugoslavije. Istraživački centar "Komunist" Beograd, "Narodna knjiga" Beograd i "Rad" Beograd, 1985. godina.
- Dimić, Ljubodrag (2001). Istorija srpske državnosti. Vol. 3. Novi Sad: Ogranak SANU.
