= Congress of the League of Communists of Yugoslavia =

Highest forum of the League of Communists of Yugoslavia

Overview
- Type: Highest forum (Note: Until 1974, the congress was designated as the LCY's supreme body.)
- Convenor: Central Committee
- Presiding organ: Working Presidency
- Electoral organ: Commission for the Verification of the Election
- Delegate types: Voting delegate Non-voting delegate Guest delegate
- Elected bodies: Central Committee; Statutory Commission; Supervisory Commission; Others it deems necessary

Meeting place
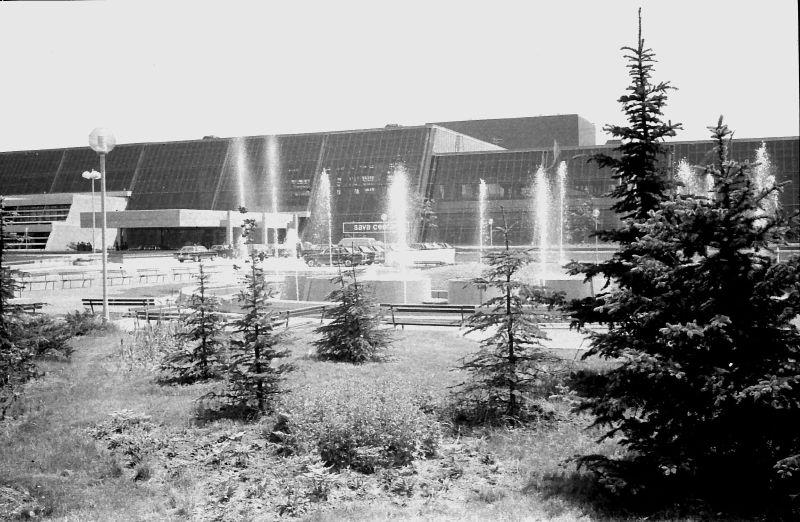
- Sava Centar, Beograd; SR Serbia, SFR Yugoslavia (1978–1990)

Statute
- "Statute of the League of Communists of Yugoslavia"

The congress was the highest forum of the League of Communists of Yugoslavia (LCY), the ruling party of the Socialist Federal Republic of Yugoslavia. It assessed the activities of the LCY organs elected at the last congress and adopted, amended and supplemented the statute and programme. The party programme discussed important issues in Yugoslavia's socialist development and the country's international affairs. The congress assessed, decided on the eligibility of and elected candidates put forward by the LCY branches to the Central Committee, the Commission on Statutory Questions, and the Supervisory Commission.

The incumbent LCY president presided over the congress proceedings until the delegates elected the Working Presidency of the Congress and the Commission for the Verification of the Election of the Organs of the LCY (CVEO). Upon the election of said bodies, the CVEO would analyse the reports submitted by the nominated and elected commissions of the LCY branches. In the event of any grievances regarding specific elections, the CVEO would start an investigation to assess the legitimacy of the election and report its findings to congress. Later, the CVEO would submit a proposal outlining the composition of the organs to be elected by the congress. Following the reports and suggestions made by the CVEO, the congress opened a hearing. Should any congress delegate have commented on the verification and election process, said delegate could submit a written comment to the CVEO. The LCY Central Committee, the Commission on Statutory Questions and the Supervisory Commission were elected by public voting, with delegates casting their votes on a proposed composition list for these organs rather than on individual candidates. Initially, there was a surplus of nominees to the number of seats up for election. The CVEO was empowered to propose one unified list, which meant that nominees who did not make the list were excluded from public vote. Congress delegates had the right to challenge individuals on the CVEO's list, and if that occurred, the member in question had to be elected by secret ballot. Ex officio members of the LCY Central Committee were not elected by congress and were verified by a session of the LCY Central Committee.

In its last years, from 1974 until its dissolution (and from 1948 to 1952), the LCY convened the congress every fourth year. Earlier, from 1964 to 1974, the statute stipulated it was to be called every fifth year. From 1952 to 1964, it was convened every sixth year, and it was convened irregularly prior to the 5th Congress in 1948. Only the LCY Central Committee could adopt a decision to convene the congress and had to do it at least three months before its opening. The decision had to include the proposed draft agenda and information on the preparatory work to convene it. (Note: The statute adopted by the 9th LCY Congress, held in 1969, is an exception to this rule. That congress abolished the LCY Central Committee and transferred its powers to convene the congress to the LCY Presidency (9th term).) The LCY Central Committee could also convene an extraordinary congress on its initiative or at the request of the congress or conference of one of the LCY branches. If an extraordinary congress was to be convened, the LCY Central Committee had to make public the agenda and mode of preparation of relevant material as well as the justification for convening an extraordinary congress. The LCY Central Committee had to publicly decide on convening an extraordinary congress at least three months after the proposal had been made. Part of congress preparatory work was electing congress delegates. A special decision of the LCY Central Committee determined the criteria for the election of congress delegates. They were to be elected in proportion to the number of members the LCY branch in question had. In addition to these delegates, a certain number of delegates from each LCY republican branch, the same number for each of them, were elected, as well as the “appropriate” number of delegates from the autonomous provinces and the party organisation in the Yugoslav People’s Army. Members of the LCY Central Committee, the Commission on Statutory Questions and the Supervisory Commissions had the same rights as congress delegates except the right to vote on the report and on the dissolution of the organ to which they belonged.

== Convocations ==
Congresses of the League of Communists of Yugoslavia
Convocation	Type	Duration	Length	Delegates	Location	Presiding officer	Ref.
1st Congress	Ordinary	20–23 April 1919	4 days	432	Beograd, Yugoslavia		
2nd Congress	Ordinary	20–25 June 1920	5 days	374	Vukovar, Yugoslavia		
3rd Congress	Ordinary	14–22 May 1926	6 days	48 (Note: 36 voting and 12 non-voting.)	Vienna, Austria		
4th Congress	Ordinary	5–16 November 1928	11 days	25	Dresden, Germany		
5th Congress	Ordinary	21–28 July 1948	8 days	2,344	Beograd, Yugoslavia	Josip Broz Tito	
6th Congress	Ordinary	2–7 November 1952	6 days	2,022	Zagreb, Yugoslavia	Josip Broz Tito	
7th Congress	Ordinary	22–26 April 1958	5 days	1,791	Ljubljana, Yugoslavia	Josip Broz Tito	
8th Congress	Ordinary	7–13 December 1964	7 days	1,442	Beograd, Yugoslavia	Josip Broz Tito	
9th Congress	Ordinary	11–15 March 1969	5 days	1,287	Beograd, Yugoslavia	Josip Broz Tito	
10th Congress	Ordinary	27–30 May 1974	4 days	1,666	Beograd, Yugoslavia	Josip Broz Tito	
11th Congress	Ordinary	20–23 June 1978	4 days	2,283	Beograd, Yugoslavia	Josip Broz Tito	
12th Congress	Ordinary	26–29 June 1982	4 days	1,721	Beograd, Yugoslavia	Dušan Dragosavac	
13th Congress	Ordinary	25–28 June 1986	4 days	1,742	Beograd, Yugoslavia	Vidoje Žarković	
14th Congress	Extraordinary	20–23 January 1990 (Note: The 14th Congress officially went into recess on 23 January 1990. That was followed up by the Slovenian, Croatian and Macedonian branches leaving the LCY. The remaining branches reconvened the 14th Congress on 26 May. The reconvened congress elected a provisional leadership, named the Committee for the Preparation of the Congress of Democratic and Programmatic Renewal of the LCY Central Committee, tasked with convening the 15th LCY Congress, which it failed to accomplish.)	4 days	1,654	Beograd, Yugoslavia	Milan Pančevski	
