= Congress of the League of Communists of Bosnia and Herzegovina =

The congress was the highest forum of the League of Communists of Bosnia and Herzegovina.

== Congresses ==
- 1st Congress of the Communist Party of Bosnia and Herzegovina — held from 1 to 5 November 1948 in Sarajevo
- 2nd Congress of the Communist Party of Bosnia and Herzegovina — held from 25 to 27 December 1954 in Sarajevo
- 3rd Congress of the Communist Party of Bosnia and Herzegovina — held from 26 to 28 March 1959 in Sarajevo
- 4th Congress of the Communist Party of Bosnia and Herzegovina — held from 2 to 5 March 1965 in Sarajevo
- 5th Congress of the League of Communists of Bosnia and Herzegovina — held from 9 to 11 January 1969 in Sarajevo
- 6th Congress of the League of Communists of Bosnia and Herzegovina — held from 26 to 28 March 1974 in Sarajevo
- 7th Congress of the League of Communists of Bosnia and Herzegovina — held from 9 to 11 May 1978 in Sarajevo
- 8th Congress of the League of Communists of Bosnia and Herzegovina — held from 18 to 20 May 1982 in Sarajevo
- 9th Congress of the League of Communists of Bosnia and Herzegovina — held from 19 to 21 May 1986 in Sarajevo
- 10th Congress of the League of Communists of Bosnia and Herzegovina — held from 7 to 9 December 1989 in Sarajevo
- 11th Congress of the League of Communists of Bosnia and Herzegovina — Socialist Democratic Party — held on 23 February 1991 in Sarajevo
