= Aleš Bebler =

Yugoslav diplomat (1907–1981)

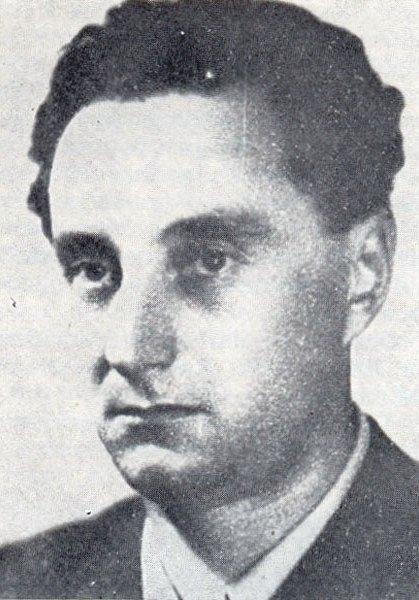
Aleš Bebler

Aleš Bebler (8 June 1907 – 12 August 1981) was a Yugoslav diplomat and a political Commissar. He was a Slovene by ethnicity and was born in Idrija, in the Austro-Hungarian Duchy of Carniola (now Slovenia).

Bebler joined the Yugoslav Communist Party in 1929, while the organization was still illegal. He completed a doctorate in law in Paris, and lived in exile (in both the Soviet Union and France) from 1931 until 1939. He served as a Republican volunteer during the Spanish Civil War, then returned home to join the Yugoslav Partisans during the Second World War. He served in the High Command of the Slovene Partisans. During the onset of World-War II, he joined Tito's Guerrillas against the invading Nazi forces.

After the war, he became Yugoslavia's Deputy Foreign Minister, and served as the country's delegate to the United Nations from 1949 until 1952, including a term as President of the United Nations Security Council in November 1950. He later worked as Under Secretary of State for Foreign Affairs, and then served as an ambassador to France and Indonesia.

In 1963, he became a constitutional court judge. He also became a prominent environmentalist.
