= 4th Congress of the Communist Party of Yugoslavia =

Political event in Yugoslavia

4th Congress of the League of Communists of Yugoslavia

Overview
- Type: Highest forum
- Presiding organ: Working Presidency

Meeting place
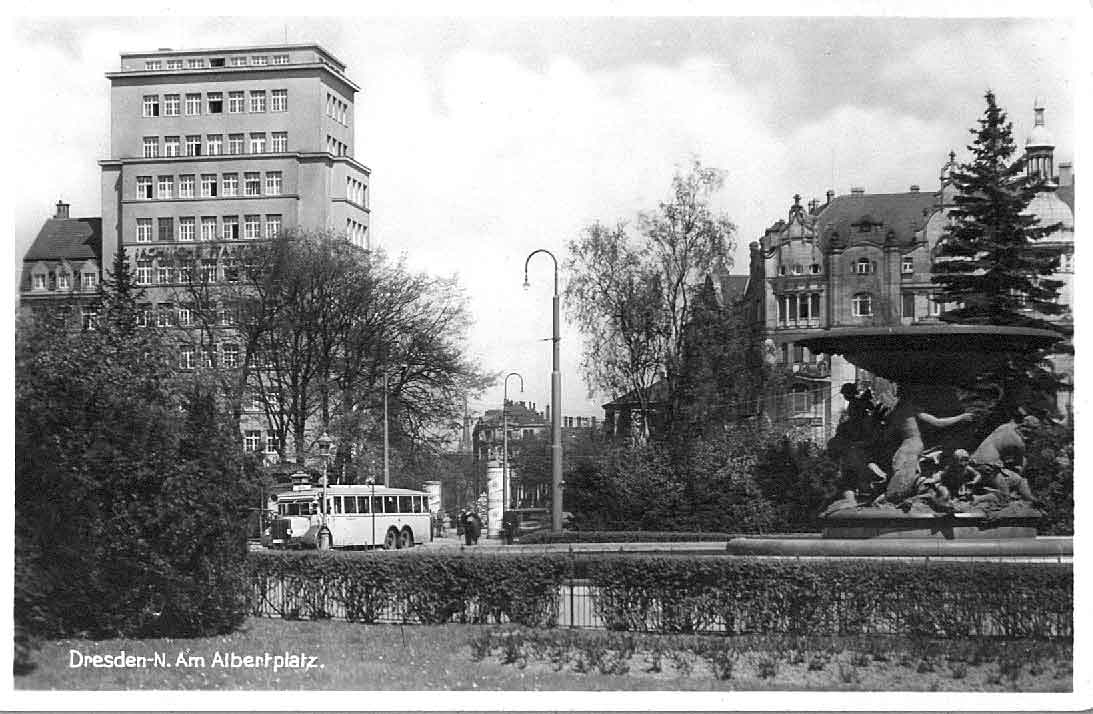
- Dresden, Germany

The Communist Party of Yugoslavia (CPY) convened the supreme body for its 4th Congress in Zonenland, Dresden, in Weimar Republic on 6–12 November 1928. It was held outside Yugoslavia because the Yugoslav authorities had banned the CPY.

== Delegates ==
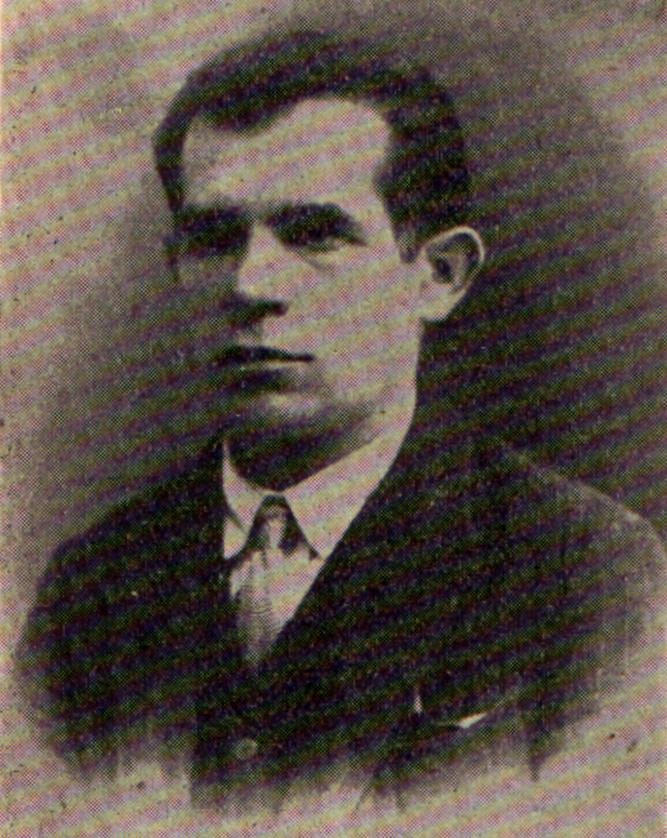
Đuro Đaković, elected in Dresden as organizational secretary

The delegates attending the congress included Sima Marković, Milorad Petrović, Živojin Pecarski, and Kočo Racin.

== Sources ==
- Zlatić, Jovan (1994). Politički život u Nišu između dva svetska rata: 1918-1941. Prosveta. ISBN 978-86-7455-136-3.
- BAS (2006). Bulgarian historical review: Revue bulgare d'histoire. Publishing House of the Bulgarian Academy of Sciences.
- Adanır, Fikret (2005). Mitteilungsblatt des Instituts für soziale Bewegungen. Ruhr-Universität Bochum, Institut für Soziale Bewegungen. ISBN 978-3-89861-431-3.
- Fleming, Thomas (2002). Montenegro: The Divided Land. Chronicles Press. ISBN 978-0-9619364-9-5.
