= Statute of the League of Communists of Yugoslavia =

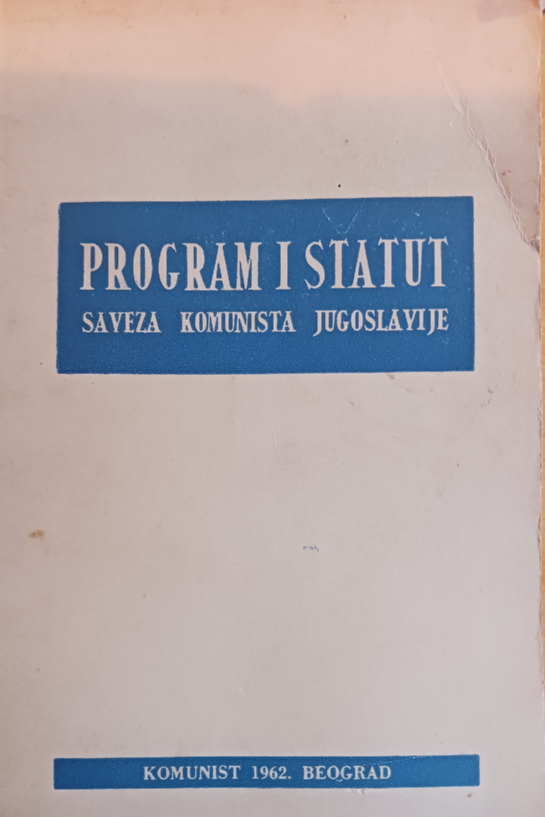
The "Program and Statute of the League of Communists of Yugoslavia" booklet published in 1962.

The Statute regulated the internal organisation of the League of Communists of Yugoslavia and specified the rights and duties of its internal organs. It was first adopted by its founding congress on 20–23 April 1919. The document originally tried to emulate the rulebook of the Communist Party of the Soviet Union, but began to develop in a different direction as a result of the Tito–Stalin split and its repercussions.

The statute explicitly stated that the LCY was governed in accordance with democratic centralism and that the league governed in the name of the dictatorship of the proletariat.
