= Borko Temelkovski =

Macedonian politician (1919–2001)

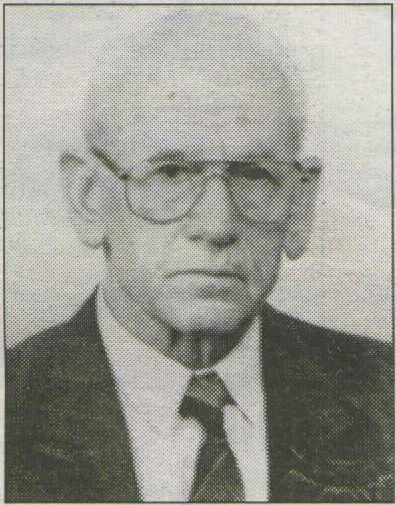

Personal details
- Born: Prilep, Kingdom of Yugoslavia
- Died: 20 November 2001 (aged 81); Skopje, Macedonia
- Political party: League of Communists of Yugoslavia (SKJ)

Borko Temelkovski (1919 – 2001) was a Macedonian politician and communist leader born in Prilep, Yugoslavia.

Temelkovski learned about hardship and unionism at a young age. As a worker he became a member of the Workers Union in early 1938. Later on, he became a member of the Communist Party in 1939.

Temelkovski was captured and imprisoned during the invasion of Yugoslavia in early 1941. Soon after his release from captivity, he joined the Yugoslav Partisans where he took various positions as Communist Party Leader. From 1942 Temelkovski was a member of the PK KPJ for Macedonia, and then Head of the Operational Zone III. From September 1944 until the end of the war he was Political Commissioner of the GS for Macedonia, a member of AVNOJ and ASNOM, and a Secretary of PK SKOJ for Macedonia.

After the war, Temelkovski performed various political functions. Among others, he was President of the Republican Council of Macedonian Trade Unions, member of the Council of Federation, Federal Deputy, member of the CK SKJ, member of the CK SKJ Presidency, the Presidency of the Main Board of SSRN Macedonia and the Central Committee of the Veteran's Federation of Macedonia (VFM).

Long after retiring, he was President of the Veteran's Federation of Macedonia, until he died in 2001. Temelkovski is officially inaugurated as a National Hero and holds numerous political and military decorations.
