= Đuro Salaj =

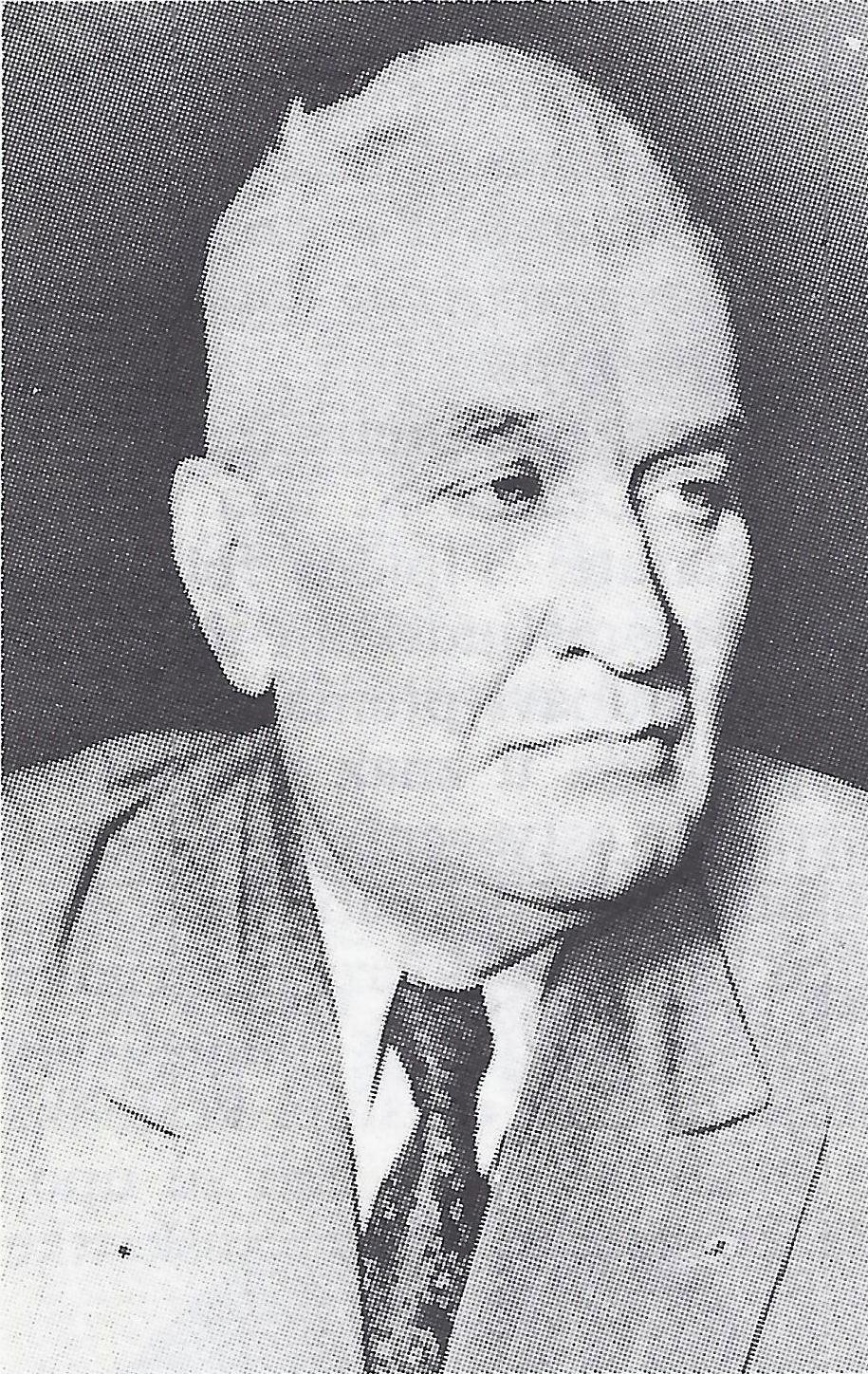
Đuro Salaj

Đuro Salaj (1889 – 20 May 1958) was one of the founders of the Communist Party of Yugoslavia and the first president of the United Labour Unions of Yugoslavia.

Salaj was born in Valpovo and received secondary education as a tailor. In 1907 he travelled to Austria, Germany and Switzerland looking for work, and became a social democrat and a trade union activist. In 1909 he moved to Sarajevo and became a local sewing trade union representative. After World War I he moved to Slavonski Brod where he became further involved in politics, and led the local branch of the Social Democratic Party to become the Communist Party.

Between 1930 and 1944, he was the representative of the Communist Party of Yugoslavia with the Comintern, stationed in the Soviet Union.

In 1945, he attended the World Trade Union Conference in London alongside many renowned trade unionists.

In SFR Yugoslavia, he was decorated with the Order of the Hero of Socialist Labour.

His remains are buried in the Tomb of the People's Heroes, Zagreb.

== Sources ==
- Salaj, Đuro (in Croatian)
