= Executive Committee of the 7th Congress of the League of Communists of Yugoslavia =

7th Executive Committee
- Emblem of the League of Communists of Yugoslavia

26 April 1958 – 13 December 1964 (6 years, 231 days) Overview
- Type: Political organ
- Election: 1st Session of the Central Committee of the 7th Congress

Members
- Total: 15 members
- Newcomers: 5 members (7th)
- Old: 10 members (6th)
- Reelected: 13 members (8th)

This electoral term of the Executive Committee was elected by the 1st Session of the Central Committee of the 7th Congress of the League of Communists of Yugoslavia in 1958, and was in session until the gathering of the 8th Congress in 1964.

== Composition ==
Members of the Executive Committee of the 7th Congress of the League of Communists of Yugoslavia
Name	6th EXE	8th EXE	Birth	PM	Death	Branch	Nationality	Gender	Ref.
Vladimir Bakarić	Old	Elected	1912	1933	1983	Croatia	Croat	Male	
Ivan Gošnjak	Old	Elected	1909	1933	1980	Croatia	Croat	Male	
Blažo Jovanović	New	Elected	1907	1924	1976	Montenegro	Montenegrin	Male	
Edvard Kardelj	Old	Elected	1910	1928	1979	Slovenia	Slovene	Male	
Lazar Koliševski	Old	Elected	1914	1935	2000	Macedonia	Macedonian	Male	
Franc Leskošek	Old	Not	1897	1926	1983	Slovenia	Slovene	Male	
Miha Marinko	New	Elected	1900	1923	1983	Slovenia	Slovene	Male	
Đuro Pucar	Old	Elected	1899	1922	1979	Bosnia-Herzegovina	Serb	Male	
Aleksandar Ranković	Old	Elected	1909	1928	1983	Serbia	Serb	Male	
Đuro Salaj	Old	Died	1889	1919	1958	Croatia	Croat	Male	
Petar Stambolić	New	Elected	1912	1935	2007	Serbia	Serb	Male	
Josip Broz Tito	Old	Elected	1892	1920	1980	Not made public	Croat	Male	
Jovan Veselinov	New	Elected	1906	1923	1982	Serbia	Serb	Male	
Veljko Vlahović	New	Elected	1914	1935	1975	Montenegro	Montenegrin	Male	
Svetozar Vukmanović	Old	Elected	1912	1933	2000	Montenegro	Montenegrin	Male	

== Bibliography ==
- Staff writer, ed. (1966). Svjetski almanah [World Almanac] (in Serbo-Croatian). Vol. 4. Novinsko izdavačko poduzeće.
- Lewytzkyj, Borys; Stroynowski, Juliusz, eds. (1978). Who's Who in the Socialist Countries. K. G. Saur Verlag. ISBN 3-7940-3017-6.
- Zalar, Charles, ed. (1961). Yugoslav Communism: A Critical Study. United States Government Printing Office. Archived from the original on 11 June 2023.
