= Politburo of the 5th Congress of the Communist Party of Yugoslavia =

5th Politburo
- Emblem of the League of Communists of Yugoslavia

28 July 1948 – 7 November 1952 (4 years, 102 days) Overview
- Type: Political organ
- Election: 1st Session of the Central Committee of the 5th Congress

Members
- Total: 9 members
- Newcomers: 3 members (5th)
- Old: 6 members (4th)
- Reelected: 8 members (6th)

This electoral term of the Politburo was elected by the 1st Session of the Central Committee of the 5th Congress of the Communist Party of Yugoslavia in 1948, and was in session until the gathering of the 6th Congress in 1952.

== Composition ==
=== Members ===
Members of the Politburo of the 5th Congress of the Communist Party of Yugoslavia
Name	4th POL	6th EXE	Birth	PM	Death	Branch	Nationality	Gender	Ref.
Milovan Đilas	Old	Elected	1911	1933	1995	Montenegro	Montenegrin	Male	
Ivan Gošnjak	New	Elected	1909	1933	1980	Croatia	Croat	Male	
Edvard Kardelj	Old	Elected	1910	1928	1979	Slovenia	Slovene	Male	
Boris Kidrič	New	Elected	1912	1928	1953	Slovenia	Slovene	Male	
Franc Leskošek	Old	Elected	1897	1926	1983	Slovenia	Slovene	Male	
Blagoje Nešković	New	Not	1907	1935	1984	Serbia	Serb	Male	
Moša Pijade	Old	Elected	1890	1920	1957	Serbia	Serb	Male	
Aleksandar Ranković	Old	Elected	1909	1928	1983	Serbia	Serb	Male	
Josip Broz Tito	Old	Elected	1892	1920	1980	Not made public	Croat	Male	

=== Candidates ===
Candidates of the Politburo of the 5th Congress of the Communist Party of Yugoslavia
Name	4th POL	6th EXE	Birth	PM	Death	Branch	Nationality	Gender	Ref.
Vladimir Bakarić	New	Member	1912	1933	1983	Croatia	Croat	Male	
Đuro Pucar	New	Member	1899	1922	1979	Bosnia-Herzegovina	Serb	Male	
Lazar Koliševski	New	Member	1914	1935	2000	Macedonia	Macedonian	Male	
Svetozar Vukmanović	New	Member	1912	1933	2000	Montenegro	Montenegrin	Male	

== Bibliography ==
- Staff writer, ed. (1966). Svjetski almanah [World Almanac] (in Serbo-Croatian). Vol. 4. Novinsko izdavačko poduzeće.
- Lewytzkyj, Borys; Stroynowski, Juliusz, eds. (1978). Who's Who in the Socialist Countries. K. G. Saur Verlag. ISBN 3-7940-3017-6.
- Zalar, Charles, ed. (1961). Yugoslav Communism: A Critical Study. United States Government Printing Office. Archived from the original on 11 June 2023.
- Živkovíc, Dusan; Apostolski, Mihailo; Kačavenda, Petar, eds. (1982). National Heroes of Yugoslavia [Narodni heroji Jugoslavije] (in Serbo-Croatian). Narodna knjiga.
