= Presidency of the 8th Congress of the League of Communists of Yugoslavia =

8th Presidency
- Emblem of the League of Communists of Yugoslavia

13 December 1964 – 15 March 1969 (4 years, 92 days) Overview
- Type: Political organ
- Election: 1st Session of the Central Committee of the 8th Congress

Members
- Total: 19 members (1964–1966); 35 (1966–1969)
- Newcomers: 5 members (1964–1966); 18 (1966–1969)
- Old: 14 members (7th, 1964–1966); 17 members (1966–1969)
- Reelected: 17 members (1966); 12 members (9th)

This electoral term of the Executive Committee was elected by the 1st Session of the Central Committee of the 8th Congress of the League of Communists of Yugoslavia on 13 December 1964, and was in session until the 5th Session on 4 October 1966, which abolished it and replaced it with a new body: Presidency of the Party Central Committee. The Presidency was in session until the gathering of the 9th Congress in 1969.

== Composition ==
=== 1st Session: 1964–1966 ===
Members of the Executive Committee of the 8th Congress of the League of Communists of Yugoslavia
| Name | 7th EXE | 5th PLS | Birth | PM | Death | Branch | Nationality | Gender | Ref. |
|---|---|---|---|---|---|---|---|---|---|
| Vladimir Bakarić | Old | Elected | 1912 | 1933 | 1983 | Croatia | Croat | Male | |
| Krste Crvenkovski | New | Elected | 1921 | 1939 | 2001 | Macedonia | Macedonian | Male | |
| Ivan Gošnjak | Old | Elected | 1909 | 1933 | 1980 | Croatia | Croat | Male | |
| Blažo Jovanović | Old | Elected | 1907 | 1924 | 1976 | Montenegro | Montenegrin | Male | |
| Edvard Kardelj | Old | Elected | 1910 | 1928 | 1979 | Slovenia | Slovene | Male | |
| Lazar Koliševski | Old | Elected | 1914 | 1935 | 2000 | Macedonia | Macedonian | Male | |
| Boris Kraigher | New | Elected | 1914 | 1934 | 1967 | Slovenia | Slovene | Male | |
| Miha Marinko | Old | Elected | 1900 | 1923 | 1983 | Slovenia | Slovene | Male | |
| Cvijetin Mijatović | New | Elected | 1913 | 1934 | 1993 | Bosnia-Herzegovina | Serb | Male | |
| Đorđije Pajković | New | Elected | 1917 | 1936 | 1980 | Montenegro | Montenegrin | Male | |
| Đuro Pucar | Old | Elected | 1899 | 1922 | 1979 | Bosnia-Herzegovina | Serb | Male | |
| Aleksandar Ranković | Old | Not | 1909 | 1928 | 1983 | Serbia | Serb | Male | |
| Mika Špiljak | New | Elected | 1916 | 1938 | 2007 | Croatia | Croat | Male | |
| Petar Stambolić | Old | Elected | 1912 | 1935 | 2007 | Serbia | Serb | Male | |
| Josip Broz Tito | Old | Elected | 1892 | 1920 | 1980 | Not made public | Croat | Male | |
| Mijalko Todorović | New | Not | 1913 | 1938 | 1999 | Serbia | Serb | Male | |
| Jovan Veselinov | Old | Elected | 1906 | 1923 | 1982 | Serbia | Serb | Male | |
| Veljko Vlahović | Old | Elected | 1914 | 1935 | 1975 | Montenegro | Montenegrin | Male | |
| Svetozar Vukmanović | Old | Elected | 1912 | 1933 | 2000 | Montenegro | Montenegrin | Male | |

=== 5th Session: 1966–1969 ===
Members of the Presidency of the 8th Congress of the League of Communists of Yugoslavia
| Name | 1st PLS | 9th PRE | Birth | PM | Death | Branch | Nationality | Gender | Ref. |
|---|---|---|---|---|---|---|---|---|---|
| Vladimir Bakarić | Old | Elected | 1912 | 1933 | 1983 | Croatia | Croat | Male | |
| Jakov Blažević | New | Elected | 1912 | 1928 | 1996 | Croatia | Croat | Male | |
| Krste Crvenkovski | Old | Elected | 1921 | 1939 | 2001 | Macedonia | Macedonian | Male | |
| Savka Dabčević-Kučar | New | Ex-officio | 1923 | 1943 | 2009 | Croatia | Croat | Female | |
| Ratomir Dugonjić | New | Elected | 1916 | 1937 | 1987 | Bosnia-Herzegovina | Serb | Male | |
| Ivan Gošnjak | Old | Not | 1909 | 1933 | 1980 | Croatia | Croat | Male | |
| Fadilj Hodža | New | Elected | 1916 | 1941 | 2001 | Kosovo | Albanian | Male | |
| Avdo Humo | New | Not | 1914 | 1941 | 1983 | Bosnia-Herzegovina | Muslim | Male | |
| Blažo Jovanović | Old | Not | 1907 | 1924 | 1976 | Montenegro | Montenegrin | Male | |
| Osman Karabegović | New | Not | 1911 | 1932 | 1996 | Bosnia-Herzegovina | Muslim | Male | |
| Edvard Kardelj | Old | Elected | 1910 | 1928 | 1979 | Slovenia | Slovene | Male | |
| Rudi Kolak | New | Not | 1918 | 1941 | 2004 | Bosnia-Herzegovina | Croat | Male | |
| Lazar Koliševski | Old | Elected | 1914 | 1935 | 2000 | Macedonia | Macedonian | Male | |
| Boris Kraigher | Old | Died | 1914 | 1934 | 1967 | Slovenia | Slovene | Male | |
| Ivan Maček | New | Not | 1908 | 1930 | 1993 | Slovenia | Slovene | Male | |
| Miha Marinko | Old | Not | 1900 | 1923 | 1983 | Slovenia | Slovene | Male | |
| Cvijetin Mijatović | Old | Elected | 1913 | 1934 | 1993 | Bosnia-Herzegovina | Serb | Male | |
| Đorđije Pajković | Old | Not | 1917 | 1936 | 1980 | Montenegro | Montenegrin | Male | |
| Dušan Petrović | New | Not | 1914 | 1935 | 1977 | Serbia | Serb | Male | |
| Koča Popović | New | Not | 1908 | 1933 | 1992 | Serbia | Serb | Male | |
| Milentije Popović | New | Elected | 1913 | 1939 | 1971 | Serbia | Serb | Male | |
| Vladimir Popović | New | Not | 1914 | 1932 | 1972 | Montenegro | Montenegrin | Male | |
| Đuro Pucar | Old | Not | 1899 | 1922 | 1979 | Bosnia-Herzegovina | Serb | Male | |
| Dobrivoje Radosavljević | New | Not | 1915 | 1933 | 1984 | Serbia | Serb | Male | |
| Nikola Sekulić | New | Not | 1911 | 1931 | 2002 | Croatia | Croat | Male | |
| Lidija Šentjurc | New | Not | 1911 | 1932 | 2000 | Slovenia | Slovene | Female | |
| Vidoe Smilevski | New | Not | 1915 | 1940 | 1979 | Macedonia | Macedonian | Male | |
| Pal Šoti | New | Not | 1916 | 1936 | 1993 | Vojvodina | Hungarian | Male | |
| Mika Špiljak | Old | Elected | 1916 | 1938 | 2007 | Croatia | Croat | Male | |
| Petar Stambolić | Old | Elected | 1912 | 1935 | 2007 | Serbia | Serb | Male | |
| Borko Temelkovski | New | Not | 1919 | 1939 | 2001 | Macedonia | Macedonian | Male | |
| Josip Broz Tito | Old | Elected | 1892 | 1918 | 1980 | Not made public | Croat | Male | |
| Jovan Veselinov | Old | Not | 1906 | 1923 | 1982 | Serbia | Serb | Male | |
| Veljko Vlahović | Old | Elected | 1914 | 1935 | 1975 | Montenegro | Montenegrin | Male | |
| Svetozar Vukmanović | Old | Not | 1912 | 1933 | 2000 | Montenegro | Montenegrin | Male | |

== Bibliography ==
- Staff writer, ed. (1966). Svjetski almanah [World Almanac] (in Serbo-Croatian). Vol. 4. Novinsko izdavačko poduzeće.
- Lewytzkyj, Borys; Stroynowski, Juliusz, eds. (1978). Who's Who in the Socialist Countries. K. G. Saur Verlag. ISBN 3-7940-3017-6.
- Stroynowski, Juliusz, ed. (1989a). Who's Who in the Socialist Countries of Europe: A–H. K. G. Saur Verlag. ISBN 3-598-10719-6.
- Stroynowski, Juliusz, ed. (1989b). Who's Who in the Socialist Countries of Europe: I–O. K. G. Saur Verlag. ISBN 3-598-10719-6.
- Stroynowski, Juliusz, ed. (1989c). Who's Who in the Socialist Countries of Europe: P–Z. K. G. Saur Verlag. ISBN 3-598-10719-6.
- Zalar, Charles, ed. (1961). Yugoslav Communism: A Critical Study. United States Government Printing Office. Archived from the original on 11 June 2023.
