= Executive Committee of the 6th Congress of the League of Communists of Yugoslavia =

6th Executive Committee
- Emblem of the League of Communists of Yugoslavia

7 November 1952 – 26 April 1958 (5 years, 170 days) Overview
- Type: Political organ
- Election: 1st Session of the Central Committee of the 6th Congress

Members
- Total: 13 members
- Newcomers: 5 members (6th)
- Old: 8 members (5th)
- Reelected: 10 members (7th)

This electoral term of the Executive Committee was elected by the 1st Session of the Central Committee of the 6th Congress of the League of Communists of Yugoslavia in 1952, and was in session until the gathering of the 7th Congress in 1958.

== Composition ==
Members of the Executive Committee of the 6th Congress of the Communist Party of Yugoslavia
Name	5th POL	7th EXE	Birth	PM	Death	Branch	Nationality	Gender	Ref.
Vladimir Bakarić	Candidate	Elected	1912	1933	1983	Croatia	Croat	Male	
Milovan Đilas	Old	Not (Expelled from CC of the LCY on 3rd extraordinary session of CC on January 1954)	1911	1933	1995	Montenegro	Montenegrin	Male	
Ivan Gošnjak	Old	Elected	1909	1933	1980	Croatia	Croat	Male	
Edvard Kardelj	Old	Elected	1910	1928	1979	Slovenia	Slovene	Male	
Boris Kidrič	Old	Died	1912	1928	1953	Slovenia	Slovene	Male	
Lazar Koliševski	Candidate	Elected	1914	1935	2000	Macedonia	Macedonian	Male	
Franc Leskošek	Old	Elected	1897	1926	1983	Slovenia	Slovene	Male	
Moša Pijade	Old	Died	1890	1920	1957	Serbia	Serb	Male	
Đuro Pucar	Candidate	Elected	1899	1922	1979	Bosnia-Herzegovina	Serb	Male	
Aleksandar Ranković	Old	Elected	1909	1928	1983	Serbia	Serb	Male	
Đuro Salaj	New	Elected	1899	1919	1958	Croatia	Croat	Male	
Josip Broz Tito	Old	Elected	1892	1920	1980	Not made public	Croat	Male	
Svetozar Vukmanović	Candidate	Elected	1912	1933	2000	Montenegro	Montenegrin	Male	

== Bibliography ==
- Staff writer, ed. (1966). Svjetski almanah [World Almanac] (in Serbo-Croatian). Vol. 4. Novinsko izdavačko poduzeće.
- Lewytzkyj, Borys; Stroynowski, Juliusz, eds. (1978). Who's Who in the Socialist Countries. K. G. Saur Verlag. ISBN 3-7940-3017-6.
- Zalar, Charles, ed. (1961). Yugoslav Communism: A Critical Study. United States Government Printing Office. Archived from the original on 11 June 2023.
