= Central Committee of the 7th Congress of the League of Communists of Yugoslavia =

7th Central Committee
- Emblem of the League of Communists of Yugoslavia

26 April 1958 – 13 December 1964 (6 years, 231 days) Overview
- Type: Highest organ
- Election: 7th Congress

Members
- Total: 134 members
- Newcomers: 32 members (7th)
- Old: 102 members (6th)
- Reelected: 81 members (10th)

This electoral term of the Central Committee was elected by the 7th Congress of the League of Communists of Yugoslavia in 1958, and was in session until the gathering of the 8th Congress in 1964.

== Convocations ==
Meetings of the Central Committee of the 7th Congress
| Meeting | Date | Length | Ref. |
|---|---|---|---|
| 1st Session | 26 April 1958 | 1 day | |
| 2nd Session | 18–19 November 1959 | 2 days | |
| 3rd Session | 27 November 1961 | 1 day | |
| 4th Session | 22–23 June 1962 | 2 days | |
| 5th Session | 18 May 1963 | 1 day | |
| 6th Session | 17 March 1964 | 2 days | |

== Composition ==
Members of the Central Committee of the 7th Congress of the League of Communists of Yugoslavia
| Name | 6th | 8th | Birth | PM | Death | Branch | Nationality | Gender | Ref. |
|---|---|---|---|---|---|---|---|---|---|
| Vera Aceva | Old | Not | 1919 | 1940 | 2006 | Macedonia | Macedonian | Female | |
| Risto Antunović | Old | Elected | 1917 | 1940 | 1998 | Serbia | Serb | Male | |
| Ljupčo Arsov | Old | Not | 1910 | 1940 | 1986 | Macedonia | Macedonian | Male | |
| Viktor Avbelj | Old | Elected | 1914 | 1937 | 1993 | Slovenia | Slovene | Male | |
| Ljubo Babić | New | Not | 1916 | 1940 | 2014 | Bosnia-Herzegovina | Serb | Male | |
| Spasenija Babović | Old | Elected | 1907 | 1928 | 1977 | Serbia | Serb | Female | |
| Filip Bajković | New | Not | 1910 | 1932 | 1985 | Montenegro | Montenegrin | Male | |
| Vladimir Bakarić | Old | Elected | 1912 | 1933 | 1983 | Croatia | Croat | Male | |
| Mitar Bakić | New | Died | 1908 | 1932 | 1960 | Montenegro | Montenegrin | Male | |
| Aleš Bebler | Old | Not | 1907 | 1929 | 1981 | Slovenia | Slovenes | Male | |
| Vlajko Begović | Old | Not | 1905 | 1930 | 1989 | Bosnia-Herzegovina | Serb | Male | |
| Marko Belinić | Old | Elected | 1911 | 1934 | 2004 | Croatia | Croat | Male | |
| Anka Berus | Old | Elected | 1903 | 1934 | 1991 | Croatia | Croat | Female | |
| Antun Biber | Old | Elected | 1910 | 1939 | 1995 | Croatia | Croat | Male | |
| Džemal Bijedić | New | Not | 1917 | 1939 | 1977 | Bosnia-Herzegovina | Muslim | Male | |
| Jakov Blažević | Old | Elected | 1912 | 1928 | 1996 | Croatia | Croat | Male | |
| Ivan Božičević | Old | Elected | 1909 | 1934 | 1999 | Croatia | Croat | Male | |
| Marijan Brecelj | New | Not | 1910 | 1943 | 1989 | Slovenia | Slovenes | Male | |
| Hasan Brkić | Old | Elected | 1913 | 1933 | 1965 | Bosnia-Herzegovina | Muslim | Male | |
| Zvonko Brkić | Old | Elected | 1912 | 1935 | 1977 | Croatia | Croat | Male | |
| Krsto Bulajić | New | Elected | 1920 | 1941 | 2009 | Montenegro | Montenegrin | Male | |
| Josip Cazi | Old | Not | 1907 | 1941 | 1977 | Croatia | Croat | Male | |
| Rodoljub Čolaković | Old | Elected | 1900 | 1919 | 1983 | Bosnia-Herzegovina | Serb | Male | |
| Krste Crvenkovski | Old | Elected | 1921 | 1939 | 2001 | Macedonia | Macedonian | Male | |
| Marijan Cvetković | New | Elected | 1920 | 1938 | 1990 | Croatia | Croat | Male | |
| Uglješa Danilović | Old | Elected | 1913 | 1935 | 2003 | Bosnia-Herzegovina | Serb | Male | |
| Peko Dapčević | Old | Not | 1913 | 1933 | 1999 | Montenegro | Montenegrin | Male | |
| Stevan Doronjski | Old | Elected | 1919 | 1939 | 1981 | Serbia | Serb | Male | |
| Ilija Došen | Old | Not | 1914 | 1936 | 1991 | Bosnia-Herzegovina | Serb | Male | |
| Ratomir Dugonjić | Old | Elected | 1916 | 1937 | 1987 | Bosnia-Herzegovina | Serb | Male | |
| Strahil Gigov | Old | Elected | 1909 | 1929 | 1999 | Macedonia | Macedonian | Male | |
| Ivan Gošnjak | Old | Elected | 1909 | 1933 | 1980 | Croatia | Croat | Male | |
| Pavle Gregorić | Old | Not | 1892 | 1921 | 1989 | Croatia | Croat | Male | |
| Mito Hadživasilev | New | Not | 1922 | 1940 | 1968 | Macedonia | Macedonian | Male | |
| Fadilj Hodža | New | Elected | 1916 | 1941 | 2001 | Serbia | Albanian | Male | |
| Janez Hribar | Old | Not | 1909 | 1939 | 1967 | Slovenia | Slovene | Male | |
| Josip Hrnčević | Old | Not | 1901 | 1933 | 1994 | Croatia | Croat | Male | |
| Avdo Humo | Old | Elected | 1914 | 1941 | 1983 | Bosnia-Herzegovina | Muslim | Male | |
| Albert Jakopič | New | Elected | 1914 | 1942 | 1996 | Slovenia | Slovene | Male | |
| Vlado Janić | Old | Not | 1904 | 1931 | 1991 | Croatia | Croat | Male | |
| Edo Jardas | New | Not | 1901 | 1948 | 1980 | Croatia | Croat | Male | |
| Đurica Jojkić | New | Elected | 1914 | 1939 | 1981 | Serbia | Serb | Male | |
| Blažo Jovanović | Old | Elected | 1907 | 1924 | 1976 | Montenegro | Montenegrin | Male | |
| Isa Jovanović | Old | Not | 1906 | 1928 | 1983 | Serbia | Serb | Male | |
| Niko Jurinčić | Old | Elected | 1914 | 1935 | 1983 | Bosnia-Herzegovina | Serb | Male | |
| Ante Jurjević | New | Elected | 1915 | 1939 | 2001 | Croatia | Croat | Male | |
| Osman Karabegović | Old | Elected | 1911 | 1932 | 1996 | Bosnia-Herzegovina | Muslim | Male | |
| Ivan Karaivanov | Old | Died | 1889 | 1945 | 1960 | Macedonia | Bulgarian | Male | |
| Edvard Kardelj | Old | Elected | 1910 | 1928 | 1979 | Slovenia | Slovene | Male | |
| Stane Kavčič | Old | Elected | 1909 | 1941 | 1987 | Slovenia | Slovene | Male | |
| Danilo Kekić | New | Elected | 1918 | 1939 | 1999 | Serbia | Serb | Male | |
| Lazar Koliševski | Old | Elected | 1914 | 1935 | 2000 | Macedonia | Macedonian | Male | |
| Slavko Komar | Old | Elected | 1918 | 1940 | 2012 | Croatia | Croat | Male | |
| Nikola Kovačević | Old | Died | 1890 | 1920 | 1964 | Montenegro | Montenegrin | Male | |
| Ivan Krajačić | Old | Elected | 1906 | 1934 | 1986 | Croatia | Croat | Male | |
| Boris Kraigher | Old | Elected | 1914 | 1934 | 1967 | Slovenia | Slovene | Male | |
| Sergej Kraigher | Old | Elected | 1914 | 1934 | 2001 | Slovenia | Slovene | Male | |
| Otmar Kreačić | Old | Elected | 1913 | 1937 | 1992 | Croatia | Croat | Male | |
| Vladimir Krivic | Old | Not | 1914 | 1933 | 1996 | Slovenia | Slovene | Male | |
| Vicko Krstulović | Old | Not | 1905 | 1922 | 1988 | Croatia | Croat | Male | |
| Dušan Kveder | New | Not | 1915 | 1933 | 1966 | Slovenia | Slovene | Male | |
| Voja Leković | Old | Not | 1912 | 1939 | 1997 | Serbia | Serb | Male | |
| Franc Leskošek | Old | Elected | 1897 | 1926 | 1983 | Slovenia | Slovene | Male | |
| Ivan Maček | Old | Elected | 1908 | 1930 | 1993 | Slovenia | Slovene | Male | |
| Šefket Maglajlić | Old | Not | 1912 | 1932 | 1983 | Bosnia-Herzegovina | Muslim | Male | |
| Pašaga Mandžić | Old | Not | 1907 | 1929 | 1975 | Bosnia-Herzegovina | Serb | Male | |
| Miha Marinko | Old | Elected | 1900 | 1923 | 1983 | Slovenia | Slovene | Male | |
| Moma Marković | Old | Elected | 1912 | 1933 | 1992 | Serbia | Serb | Male | |
| Krste Markovski | New | Not | 1925 | 1941 | ? | Macedonia | Macedonian | Male | |
| Božidar Maslarić | Old | Died | 1895 | 1920 | 1963 | Croatia | Croat | Male | |
| Veljko Mićunović | Old | Elected | 1916 | 1934 | 1982 | Montenegro | Montenegrin | Male | |
| Cvijetin Mijatović | Old | Elected | 1913 | 1934 | 1993 | Bosnia-Herzegovina | Serb | Male | |
| Nikola Minčev | Old | Elected | 1915 | 1942 | 1997 | Macedonia | Macedonian | Male | |
| Milka Minić | New | Elected | 1914 | 1938 | 2003 | Serbia | Serb | Female | |
| Miloš Minić | Old | Elected | 1915 | 1936 | 2000 | Serbia | Serb | Male | |
| Lazar Mojsov | New | Elected | 1920 | 1940 | 2011 | Macedonia | Macedonian | Male | |
| Karlo Mrazović | Old | Not | 1902 | 1927 | 1987 | Croatia | Croat | Male | |
| Andrija Mugoša | Old | Not | 1910 | 1933 | 2006 | Montenegro | Montenegrin | Male | |
| Kosta Nađ | Old | Not | 1911 | 1937 | 1986 | Serbia | Hungarian | Male | |
| Naum Naumovski | Old | Died | 1920 | 1940 | 1960 | Macedonia | Macedonian | Male | |
| Radisav Nedeljković | Old | Not | 1911 | 1937 | 1996 | Serbia | Serb | Male | |
| Milijan Neoričić | Old | Elected | 1922 | 1941 | 2014 | Serbia | Serb | Male | |
| Marko Nikezić | New | Elected | 1921 | 1940 | 1991 | Serbia | Serb | Male | |
| Džavid Nimani | Old | Not | 1919 | 1941 | 2000 | Serbia | Albanian | Male | |
| Grujo Novaković | New | Not | 1913 | 1936 | 1975 | Bosnia-Herzegovina | Serb | Male | |
| Bogdan Osolnik | New | Elected | 1920 | 1942 | 2019 | Slovenia | Slovene | Male | |
| Đorđije Pajković | Old | Elected | 1917 | 1936 | 1980 | Montenegro | Montenegrin | Male | |
| Radovan Papić | New | Not | 1910 | 1940 | 1983 | Bosnia-Herzegovina | Serb | Male | |
| Mišo Pavićević | New | Not | 1915 | 1941 | 1995 | Montenegro | Montenegrin | Male | |
| Slobodan Penezić | Old | Died | 1918 | 1939 | 1964 | Serbia | Serb | Male | |
| Puniša Perović | Old | Not | 1911 | 1933 | 1984 | Montenegro | Montenegrin | Male | |
| Dušan Petrović | Old | Elected | 1914 | 1935 | 1977 | Serbia | Serb | Male | |
| Mile Počuča | Old | Not | 1899 | 1923 | 1980 | Croatia | Croat | Male | |
| Krsto Popivoda | Old | Elected | 1910 | 1933 | 1988 | Montenegro | Montenegrin | Male | |
| Koča Popović | Old | Elected | 1908 | 1933 | 1992 | Serbia | Serb | Male | |
| Milentije Popović | Old | Elected | 1913 | 1939 | 1971 | Serbia | Serb | Male | |
| Vladimir Popović | Old | Elected | 1914 | 1932 | 1972 | Montenegro | Montenegrin | Male | |
| Jože Potrč | Old | Died | 1903 | 1924 | 1963 | Slovenia | Slovene | Male | |
| Srđa Prica | Old | Not | 1905 | 1926 | 1984 | Croatia | Croat | Male | |
| Đuro Pucar | Old | Elected | 1899 | 1922 | 1979 | Bosnia-Herzegovina | Serb | Male | |
| Dobrivoje Radosavljević | Old | Elected | 1915 | 1933 | 1984 | Serbia | Serb | Male | |
| Nikola Rački | New | Not | 1914 | 1936 | 1994 | Croatia | Croat | Male | |
| Aleksandar Ranković | Old | Elected | 1909 | 1928 | 1983 | Serbia | Serb | Male | |
| Ivan Regent | Old | Not | 1884 | 1945 | 1967 | Slovenia | Slovene | Male | |
| Paško Romac | Old | Not | 1913 | 1935 | 1982 | Serbia | Serb | Male | |
| Ivan Rukavina | Old | Not | 1912 | 1935 | 1992 | Croatia | Croat | Male | |
| Đuro Salaj | Old | Died | 1899 | 1919 | 1958 | Croatia | Croat | Male | |
| Vlado Šegrt | Old | Not | 1907 | 1931 | 1991 | Bosnia-Herzegovina | Serb | Male | |
| Nikola Sekulić | Old | Elected | 1911 | 1931 | 2002 | Croatia | Croat | Male | |
| Lidija Šentjurc | Old | Elected | 1911 | 1932 | 2000 | Slovenia | Slovene | Female | |
| Boško Šiljegović | New | Elected | 1915 | 1940 | 1990 | Bosnia-Herzegovina | Serb | Male | |
| Vidoje Smilevski | Old | Elected | 1915 | 1940 | 1979 | Macedonia | Macedonian | Male | |
| Pal Šoti | Old | Elected | 1916 | 1936 | 1993 | Serbia | Hungarian | Male | |
| Mika Špiljak | Old | Elected | 1916 | 1938 | 2007 | Croatia | Croat | Male | |
| Petar Stambolić | Old | Elected | 1912 | 1935 | 2007 | Serbia | Serb | Male | |
| Dragi Stamenković | Old | Elected | 1920 | 1937 | 2004 | Serbia | Serb | Male | |
| Svetislav Stefanović | Old | Elected | 1910 | 1928 | 1980 | Serbia | Serb | Male | |
| Velimir Stojnić | Old | Elected | 1916 | 1936 | 1990 | Bosnia-Herzegovina | Serb | Male | |
| Mihajlo Švabić | Old | Not | 1919 | 1938 | 2002 | Serbia | Serb | Male | |
| Blagoje Taleski | New | Not | 1924 | 1940 | 2001 | Macedonia | Macedonian | Male | |
| Borko Temelkovski | Old | Elected | 1919 | 1939 | 2001 | Macedonia | Macedonian | Male | |
| Geza Tikvicki | New | Elected | 1917 | 1939 | 1999 | Croatia | Croat | Male | |
| Josip Broz Tito | Old | Elected | 1892 | 1920 | 1980 | Not made public | Croat | Male | |
| Mijalko Todorović | New | Elected | 1913 | 1938 | 1999 | Serbia | Serb | Male | |
| Vida Tomšič | Old | Elected | 1913 | 1934 | 1998 | Slovenia | Slovene | Female | |
| Miko Tripalo | New | Elected | 1926 | 1943 | 1995 | Croatia | Croat | Male | |
| Jovan Veselinov | Old | Elected | 1906 | 1923 | 1982 | Serbia | Serb | Male | |
| Dobrivoje Vidić | New | Elected | 1918 | 1939 | 1992 | Serbia | Serb | Male | |
| Janez Vipotnik | New | Elected | 1917 | 1942 | 1998 | Slovenia | Slovene | Male | |
| Veljko Vlahović | Old | Elected | 1914 | 1935 | 1975 | Montenegro | Montenegrin | Male | |
| Olga Vrabič | New | Not | 1916 | 1936 | 2001 | Slovenia | Slovene | Female | |
| Svetozar Vukmanović | Old | Elected | 1912 | 1933 | 2000 | Montenegro | Montenegrin | Male | |
| Veljko Zeković | Old | Elected | 1906 | 1934 | 1985 | Montenegro | Montenegrin | Male | |
| Boris Ziherl | Old | Elected | 1910 | 1930 | 1976 | Slovenia | Slovene | Male | |

== Bibliography ==
=== Books ===
- Carter, April (1982). Democratic Reform in Yugoslavia: The Changing Role of the Party. Frances Pinter Publishers. ISBN 0-903804-88-3.
- Hetemi, Atdhe (2020). Student Movements for the Republic of Kosovo: 1968, 1981 and 1997. Springer International Publishing.
- Janković, Slavko, ed. (1957). Ko je ko u Jugoslaviji: biografski podaci o jugoslovenskim savremenicima [Who's Who in Yugoslavia: Biographical Information About Yugoslav Contemporaries] (in Serbo-Croatian). Vol. 3. Izd. "Sedme sile".
- Marković, Dragan; Kržavac, Savo (1985). Zašto su smenjivani [Why Were They Replaced?] (in Serbo-Croatian). Partizanska knjiga. ISBN 978-3-030-54951-0.
- Nešović, Slobodan (1977). Diplomatska igra oko Jugoslavije 1944–1945. Stvarnost. ISBN 978-3-030-54951-0.
- Pirjevec, Jože (2018). Tito and His Comrades. University of Wisconsin Press. ISBN 9780299317706.
- Rusinow, Dennison (1978). The Yugoslav Experiment 1948–1974. University of California Press. ISBN 0-520-03730-8.
- Staff writer, ed. (1948). Odluke V. kongresa Komunističke Partije Jugoslavije [Decisions of the Fifth Congress of the Communist Party of Yugoslavia] (in Serbo-Croatian). Kultura.
- Staff writer, ed. (1953). VI kongres Komunističke partije Jugoslavije: 2-7 novembra 1952: stenografske beleške [VI Congress of the Communist Party of Yugoslavia] (in Serbo-Croatian). Kultura.
- Staff writer, ed. (1963). Summary of the Yugoslav Press. The Service.
- Staff writer, ed. (1964). Summary of the Yugoslav Press. The Service.
- Staff writer, ed. (1965). VIII Kongres Saveza Komunista Jugoslavije Beograd, 7–13. decembra 1964.: stenog̈rafske beleške [VIII Congress of the Union of Communists of Yugoslavia Belgrade, 7–13 December 1964: shorthand notes] (in Serbo-Croatian). Vol. 3. Kultura.
- Staff writer, ed. (1966). Svjetski almanah [World Almanac] (in Serbo-Croatian). Vol. 4. Novinsko izdavačko poduzeće.
- Staff writer, ed. (1982). Politički i poslovni imenik [Political and Business Directory] (in Serbo-Croatian). Vol. 3. Tanjug.
- Lewytzkyj, Borys; Stroynowski, Juliusz, eds. (1978). Who's Who in the Socialist Countries. K. G. Saur Verlag. ISBN 3-7940-3017-6.
- Stroynowski, Juliusz, ed. (1989a). Who's Who in the Socialist Countries of Europe: A–H. K. G. Saur Verlag. ISBN 3-598-10719-6.
- Stroynowski, Juliusz, ed. (1989b). Who's Who in the Socialist Countries of Europe: I–O. K. G. Saur Verlag. ISBN 3-598-10719-6.
- Stroynowski, Juliusz, ed. (1989c). Who's Who in the Socialist Countries of Europe: P–Z. K. G. Saur Verlag. ISBN 3-598-10719-6.
- Zalar, Charles, ed. (1961). Yugoslav Communism: A Critical Study. United States Government Printing Office. Archived from the original on 11 June 2023.
- Živkovíc, Dusan; Apostolski, Mihailo; Kačavenda, Petar, eds. (1982). National Heroes of Yugoslavia [Narodni heroji Jugoslavije] (in Serbo-Croatian). Narodna knjiga.

=== Journals ===
- Spasenovski, Aleksandar (December 2019). "The Transformation of the Macedonian Party System: From Monism Towards Pluralism". Political Thought. 17 (58). Konrad Adenauer Foundation and the Institute for Democracy Societas Civilis: 19–38. Archived from the original on 11 June 2023.
