= Central Committee of the 8th Congress of the League of Communists of Yugoslavia =

8th Central Committee
- Emblem of the League of Communists of Yugoslavia

13 December 1964 – 11 March 1969 (4 years, 88 days) Overview
- Type: Highest organ
- Election: 8th Congress

Members
- Total: 155 members
- Newcomers: 73 members (8th)
- Old: 82 members (7th)
- Reelected: 37 members (10th)

This electoral term of the Central Committee was elected by the 8th Congress of the League of Communists of Yugoslavia in 1964, and was in session until the convocation of the 9th Congress in 1969. That congress opted to abolish the Central Committee and replace it with the Conference of the League of Communists of Yugoslavia, which existed until 1974 when the 10th Congress re-established the Central Committee.

== Convocations ==
Meetings of the Central Committee of the 8th Congress
Meeting	Date	Length	Ref.
1st Session	13 December 1964	1 day	
2nd Session	17 June 1965	1 day	
3rd Session	25–26 February & 11 March 1966	3 days	
4th Session	1 July 1966	1 day	
5th Session	4 October 1966	1 day	
6th Session	10 January 1967	1 day	
7th Session	1 July 1967	1 day	
8th Session	23 November 1967	1 day	
9th Session	16 July 1968	1 day	
10th Session	23 August 1968	1 day	
11th Session	2 December 1968	1 day	
12th Session	5 February 1969	1 day	

== Composition ==
Members of the Central Committee of the 8th Congress of the League of Communists of Yugoslavia
Name	7th	10th	Birth	PM	Death	Branch	Nationality	Gender	Ref.
Roman Albreht	New	Elected	1921	1942	2006	Slovenia	Slovene	Male	
Nikola Andrić	New	Not	1920	1941	1992	Bosnia-Herzegovina	Serb	Male	
Risto Antunović	Old	Not	1917	1940	1998	Serbia	Serb	Male	
Viktor Avbelj	Old	Not	1914	1937	1993	Slovenia	Slovene	Male	
Spasenija Babović	Old	Not	1907	1928	1977	Serbia	Serb	Female	
Tomislav Badovinac	New	Elected	1934	1951	Alive	Croatia	Croat	Male	
Vladimir Bakarić	Old	Elected	1912	1933	1983	Croatia	Croat	Male	
Milutin Baltić	New	Elected	1920	1940	2013	Croatia	Serb	Male	
Marko Belinić	Old	Not	1911	1934	2004	Croatia	Croat	Male	
Muhamed Berberović	New	Not	1936	1954	?	Bosnia-Herzegovina	Muslim	Male	
Anka Berus	Old	Not	1903	1934	1991	Croatia	Croat	Female	
Antun Biber	Old	Not	1910	1939	1995	Croatia	Croat	Male	
Srećko Bijelić	New	Not	1930	1948	2004	Croatia	Serb	Male	
Stojan Bjelajac	New	Not	1923	1941	2004	Bosnia-Herzegovina	Serb	Male	
Jakov Blažević	Old	Not	1912	1928	1996	Croatia	Croat	Male	
Jani Bojčevski	New	Not	1930	1947	?	Macedonia	Macedonian	Male	
Anton Bole	New	Not	1916	1943	1990	Slovenia	Slovene	Male	
Ivan Božičević	Old	Not	1909	1934	1999	Croatia	Croat	Male	
Hasan Brkić	Old	Died	1913	1933	1965	Bosnia-Herzegovina	Muslim	Male	
Zvonko Brkić	Old	Not	1912	1935	1977	Croatia	Croat	Male	
Krsto Bulajić	Old	Not	1920	1941	2009	Montenegro	Montenegrin	Male	
Marin Cetinić	New	Not	1915	1936	1996	Croatia	Croat	Male	
Rodoljub Čolaković	Old	Not	1900	1919	1983	Bosnia-Herzegovina	Serb	Male	
Bogdan Crnobrnja	New	Not	1916	1941	1998	Croatia	Serb	Male	
Krste Crvenkovski	Old	Not	1921	1939	2001	Macedonia	Macedonian	Male	
Dobroslav Ćulafić	New	Elected	1926	1944	2011	Montenegro	Montenegrin	Male	
Marijan Cvetković	Old	Not	1920	1938	1990	Croatia	Croat	Male	
Savka Dabčević-Kučar	New	Not	1923	1943	2009	Croatia	Croat	Female	
Uglješa Danilović	Old	Not	1913	1935	2003	Bosnia-Herzegovina	Serb	Male	
Oskar Davičo	New	Not	1909	1939	1989	Serbia	Serb	Male	
Pavle Davkov	New	Not	1925	1942	1978	Macedonia	Macedonian	Male	
Ema Derosi	New	Not	1926	1944	2020	Croatia	Croat	Female	
Veli Deva	New	Elected	1923	1942	2015	Kosovo	Albanian	Male	
Ivan Dolničar	New	Not	1921	1941	2011	Slovenia	Slovene	Male	
Stevan Doronjski	Old	Elected	1919	1939	1981	Vojvodina	Serb	Male	
Milojko Drulović	New	Not	1923	1941	1989	Serbia	Serb	Male	
Ratomir Dugonjić	Old	Elected	1916	1937	1987	Bosnia-Herzegovina	Serb	Male	
Veselin Đuranović	New	Elected	1925	1944	1997	Montenegro	Montenegrin	Male	
Blažo Đuričić	New	Not	1914	1941	1991	Bosnia-Herzegovina	Serb	Male	
Risto Džunov	New	Not	1919	1940	2005	Macedonia	Macedonian	Male	
Strahil Gigov	Old	Not	1909	1929	1999	Macedonia	Macedonian	Male	
Kiro Gligorov	New	Elected	1917	1944	2012	Macedonia	Macedonian	Male	
Ivan Gošnjak	Old	Not	1909	1933	1980	Croatia	Croat	Male	
Aleksandar Grličkov	New	Elected	1923	1943	1989	Macedonia	Macedonian	Male	
Kiro Hadživasilev	New	Elected	1921	1943	2000	Macedonia	Macedonian	Male	
Fadilj Hodža	Old	Elected	1916	1941	2001	Kosovo	Albanian	Male	
Avdo Humo	Old	Not	1914	1941	1983	Bosnia-Herzegovina	Muslim	Male	
Vjekoslav Ivančić	New	Not	1924	1944	1975	Croatia	Croat	Male	
Albert Jakopič	Old	Not	1914	1942	1996	Slovenia	Slovene	Male	
Đurica Jojkić	Old	Not	1914	1939	1981	Serbia	Serb	Male	
Blažo Jovanović	Old	Not	1907	1924	1976	Montenegro	Montenegrin	Male	
Niko Jurinčić	Old	Not	1914	1935	1983	Bosnia-Herzegovina	Serb	Male	
Ante Jurjević	Old	Elected	1915	1939	2001	Croatia	Croat	Male	
Osman Karabegović	Old	Not	1911	1932	1996	Bosnia-Herzegovina	Muslim	Male	
Edvard Kardelj	Old	Elected	1910	1928	1979	Slovenia	Slovene	Male	
Stane Kavčič	Old	Not	1909	1941	1987	Slovenia	Slovene	Male	
Danilo Kekić	Old	Not	1918	1939	1999	Vojvodina	Serb	Male	
Rudi Kolak	New	Elected	1918	1941	2004	Bosnia-Herzegovina	Croat	Male	
Lazar Koliševski	Old	Elected	1914	1935	2000	Macedonia	Macedonian	Male	
Slavko Komar	Old	Not	1918	1940	2012	Croatia	Croat	Male	
Pero Kosorić	New	Not	1918	1941	1969	Bosnia-Herzegovina	Serb	Male	
Dušanka Kovačević	New	Not	1917	1940	1985	Bosnia-Herzegovina	Serb	Female	
Veljko Kovačević	New	Not	1912	1938	1994	Montenegro	Montenegrin	Male	
Ivan Krajačić	Old	Not	1906	1934	1986	Croatia	Croat	Male	
Boris Kraigher	Old	Died	1914	1934	1967	Slovenia	Slovene	Male	
Sergej Kraigher	Old	Not	1914	1934	2001	Slovenia	Slovene	Male	
Otmar Kreačić	Old	Not	1913	1937	1992	Croatia	Croat	Male	
Todo Kurtović	New	Elected	1919	1941	1997	Bosnia-Herzegovina	Serb	Male	
Mirko Lacković	New	Not	1923	1943	1988	Croatia	Croat	Male	
Franc Leskošek	Old	Not	1897	1926	1983	Slovenia	Slovene	Male	
Nikola Ljubičić	New	Elected	1916	1941	2005	Serbia	Serb	Male	
Vojin Lukić	New	Not	1919	1941	1997	Serbia	Serb	Male	
Ivan Maček	Old	Not	1908	1930	1993	Slovenia	Slovene	Male	
Boris Majer	New	Not	1919	1944	2010	Slovenia	Slovene	Male	
Dragiša Maksimović	New	Not	1917	1941	?	Montenegro	Montenegrin	Male	
Miha Marinko	Old	Not	1900	1923	1983	Slovenia	Slovene	Male	
Moma Marković	Old	Elected	1912	1933	1992	Serbia	Serb	Male	
Velimir Matić	New	Not	1924	1944	?	Serbia	Serb	Male	
Petar Matić	New	Not	1920	1940	2024	Vojvodina	Serb	Male	
Veljko Mićunović	Old	Not	1916	1934	1982	Montenegro	Montenegrin	Male	
Cvijetin Mijatović	Old	Elected	1913	1934	1993	Bosnia-Herzegovina	Serb	Male	
Nikola Miljanić	New	Not	1921	1942	1972	Croatia	Croat	Male	
Dragan Milojević	New	Not	1924	1944	?	Serbia	Serb	Male	
Slavko Milosavlevski	New	Not	1928	1943	2012	Macedonia	Macedonian	Male	
Nikola Minčev	Old	Not	1915	1942	1997	Macedonia	Macedonian	Male	
Milka Minić	Old	Not	1914	1938	2003	Serbia	Serb	Female	
Miloš Minić	Old	Elected	1915	1936	2000	Serbia	Serb	Male	
Iko Mirković	New	Not	1918	1938	2002	Montenegro	Montenegrin	Male	
Marija Miškolci	New	Not	1934	1951	?	Vojvodina	Hungarian	Female	
Lazar Mojsov	Old	Elected	1920	1940	2011	Macedonia	Macedonian	Male	
Dušan Mugoša	New	Not	1914	1934	1973	Kosovo	Montenegrin	Male	
Milijan Neoričić	Old	Not	1922	1941	2014	Serbia	Serb	Male	
Marko Nikezić	Old	Not	1921	1940	1991	Serbia	Serb	Male	
Marjan Orožen	New	Not	1930	1948	2015	Slovenia	Slovene	Male	
Bogdan Osolnik	Old	Not	1920	1942	2019	Slovenia	Slovene	Male	
Đorđije Pajković	Old	Not	1917	1936	1980	Montenegro	Montenegrin	Male	
Miroslav Pečujlić	New	Not	1929	1944	2006	Serbia	Croat	Male	
Dane Petkovski	New	Elected	1922	1943	2005	Macedonia	Macedonian	Male	
Dušan Petrović	Old	Elected	1914	1935	1977	Serbia	Serb	Male	
France Popit	New	Elected	1921	1940	2013	Slovenia	Slovene	Male	
Krsto Popivoda	Old	Elected	1910	1933	1988	Montenegro	Montenegrin	Male	
Koča Popović	Old	Not	1908	1933	1992	Serbia	Serb	Male	
Milentije Popović	Old	Not	1913	1939	1971	Serbia	Serb	Male	
Vladimir Popović	Old	Not	1914	1932	1972	Montenegro	Montenegrin	Male	
Milosav Prelić	New	Not	1933	1951	2003	Serbia	Serb	Male	
Đuro Pucar	Old	Not	1899	1922	1979	Bosnia-Herzegovina	Serb	Male	
Dobrivoje Radosavljević	Old	Not	1915	1933	1984	Serbia	Serb	Male	
Ilija Rajačić	New	Not	1923	1944	2005	Vojvodina	Serb	Male	
Aleksandar Ranković	Old	Expelled	1909	1928	1983	Serbia	Serb	Male	
Milan Rukavina-Šain	New	Not	1926	1943	1995	Croatia	Croat	Male	
Mustafa Šabić	New	Not	1925	1943	?	Bosnia-Herzegovina	Serb	Male	
Jefto Šašić	New	Not	1917	1939	1998	Croatia	Serb	Male	
Đura Savović	New	Not	1928	1945	?	Serbia	Serb	Male	
Kemal Sejfula	New	Not	1923	1941	1978	Macedonia	Turk	Male	
Nikola Sekulić	Old	Not	1911	1931	2002	Croatia	Croat	Male	
Lidija Šentjurc	Old	Not	1911	1932	2000	Slovenia	Slovene	Female	
Boško Šiljegović	Old	Elected	1915	1940	1990	Bosnia-Herzegovina	Serb	Male	
Tankosava Simić	New	Not	1920	1941	1997	Kosovo	Serb	Female	
Vasilije Skendzić	New	Not	1923	1941	2001	Croatia	Croat	Male	
Vidoje Smilevski	Old	Not	1915	1940	1979	Macedonia	Macedonian	Male	
Budislav Šoškić	New	Not	1925	1942	1979	Montenegro	Serb	Male	
Pal Šoti	Old	Not	1916	1936	1993	Vojvodina	Hungarian	Male	
Mika Špiljak	Old	Elected	1916	1938	2007	Croatia	Croat	Male	
Petar Stambolić	Old	Elected	1912	1935	2007	Serbia	Serb	Male	
Dragi Stamenković	Old	Not	1920	1937	2004	Serbia	Serb	Male	
Boško Stankovski	New	Not	1925	1943	1987	Macedonia	Macedonian	Male	
Svetislav Stefanović	Old	Expelled	1910	1928	1980	Serbia	Serb	Male	
Velimir Stojnić	Old	Not	1916	1936	1990	Bosnia-Herzegovina	Serb	Male	
Drago Stojović	New	Not	1920	1941	2020	Montenegro	Montenegrin	Male	
Francka Strmole	New	Not	1934	1957	2024	Slovenia	Slovene	Female	
Anto Sučić	New	Not	1929	1948	1986	Bosnia-Herzegovina	Muslim	Male	
Ali Šukrija	New	Elected	1919	1939	2005	Kosovo	Albanian	Male	
Mihailo Švabić	New	Not	1919	1938	2002	Serbia	Serb	Male	
Borko Temelkovski	Old	Not	1919	1939	2001	Macedonia	Macedonian	Male	
Geza Tikvicki	Old	Not	1917	1939	1999	Croatia	Croat	Male	
Josip Broz Tito	Old	Elected	1892	1920	1980	Not made public	Croat	Male	
Mijalko Todorović	Old	Not	1913	1938	1999	Serbia	Serb	Male	
Ljudevit Tomić	New	Not	1928	1947	?	Bosnia-Herzegovina	Muslim	Male	
Vida Tomšič	Old	Elected	1913	1934	1998	Slovenia	Slovene	Female	
Mika Tripalo	Old	Not	1926	1943	1995	Croatia	Croat	Male	
Zagorka Umičević	New	Not	1918	1940	?	Serbia	Serb	Female	
Norbert Veber	New	Not	1912	1937	1974	Croatia	Slovene	Male	
Andrej Verbič	New	Not	1920	1941	1999	Slovenia	Slovene	Male	
Jovan Veselinov	Old	Elected	1906	1923	1982	Vojvodina	Serb	Male	
Dobrivoje Vidić	Old	Elected	1918	1939	1992	Serbia	Serb	Male	
Janez Vipotnik	Old	Not	1917	1942	1998	Slovenia	Slovene	Male	
Perka Vitorović	New	Not	1926	1944	Alive	Serbia	Serb	Female	
Veljko Vlahović	Old	Elected	1914	1935	1975	Montenegro	Montenegrin	Male	
Vanja Vranjican	New	Not	1920	1939	?	Croatia	Croat	Male	
Milan Vukasović	New	Not	1920	1942	?	Montenegro	Montenegrin	Male	
Svetozar Vukmanović	Old	Not	1912	1933	2000	Montenegro	Montenegrin	Male	
Simeon Zatezalo	New	Not	1927	1945	1998	Serbia	Serb	Male	
Veljko Zeković	Old	Not	1906	1934	1985	Montenegro	Montenegrin	Male	
Boris Ziherl	Old	Elected	1910	1930	1976	Slovenia	Slovene	Male	
Jože Žohar	New	Not	1927	1947	2005	Slovenia	Slovene	Male	

== Bibliography ==
=== Books ===
- Carter, April (1982). Democratic Reform in Yugoslavia: The Changing Role of the Party. Frances Pinter Publishers. ISBN 0-903804-88-3.
- Hetemi, Atdhe (2020). Student Movements for the Republic of Kosovo: 1968, 1981 and 1997. Springer International Publishing. ISBN 978-3-030-54951-0.
- Pirjevec, Jože (2018). Tito and His Comrades. University of Wisconsin Press. ISBN 9780299317706.
- Prifti, Peter R. (1999). Confrontation in Kosova: The Albanian-Serb Struggle, 1969–1999. East European Monographs. ISBN 0-88033-435-5.
- Shaffer, Harry G. (1967). "Yugoslavia's "Own Road to Socialism": A Non-Marxist View". In Shaffer, Harry G. (ed.). The Communist World: Marxist and Non-Marxist Views (2nd ed.). Meredith Publishing Company. pp. 223–259. ISBN 9780891970934.
- Staff writer, ed. (1965). VIII Kongres Saveza Komunista Jugoslavije Beograd, 7–13. decembra 1964.: stenog̈rafske beleške [VIII Congress of the Union of Communists of Yugoslavia Belgrade, 7–13 December 1964: shorthand notes] (in Serbo-Croatian). Vol. 3. Kultura.
- Staff writer, ed. (1953). VI kongres Komunističke partije Jugoslavije: 2-7 novembra 1952: stenografske beleške [VI Congress of the Communist Party of Yugoslavia] (in Serbo-Croatian). Kultura.
- Staff writer, ed. (1966). Svjetski almanah [World Almanac] (in Serbo-Croatian). Vol. 4. Novinsko izdavačko poduzeće.
- Lewytzkyj, Borys; Stroynowski, Juliusz, eds. (1978). Who's Who in the Socialist Countries. K. G. Saur Verlag. ISBN 3-7940-3017-6.
- Rusinow, Dennison (1978). The Yugoslav Experiment 1948–1974. University of California Press. ISBN 0-520-03730-8.
- Stroynowski, Juliusz, ed. (1989a). Who's Who in the Socialist Countries of Europe: A–H. K. G. Saur Verlag. ISBN 3-598-10719-6.
- Stroynowski, Juliusz, ed. (1989b). Who's Who in the Socialist Countries of Europe: I–O. K. G. Saur Verlag. ISBN 3-598-10719-6.
- Stroynowski, Juliusz, ed. (1989c). Who's Who in the Socialist Countries of Europe: P–Z. K. G. Saur Verlag. ISBN 3-598-10719-6.
- Zalar, Charles, ed. (1961). Yugoslav Communism: A Critical Study. United States Government Printing Office. Archived from the original on 11 June 2023.

=== Journals ===
- Spasenovski, Aleksandar (December 2019). "The Transformation of the Macedonian Party System: From Monism Towards Pluralism". Political Thought. 17 (58). Konrad Adenauer Foundation and the Institute for Democracy Societas Civilis: 19–38. Archived from the original on 11 June 2023.
