= 7th Central Committee =

7th Central Committee may refer to:

- Central Committee of the 7th Congress of the Russian Communist Party (Bolsheviks), 1918–1919
- 7th Central Committee of the Chinese Communist Party, 1945–1956
- 7th Central Committee of the Communist Party of Cuba, 2016–2021
- 7th Central Committee of the Workers' Party of Korea, 2016–2021
- 7th Central Committee of the Lao People's Revolutionary Party, 2001–2006
- 7th Central Committee of the Communist Party of Vietnam, 1991–1996
- Central Committee of the 7th Congress of the League of Communists of Yugoslavia, 1958–1964
