= Moša Pijade =

Yugoslav communist politician

- Мoшa Пијаде
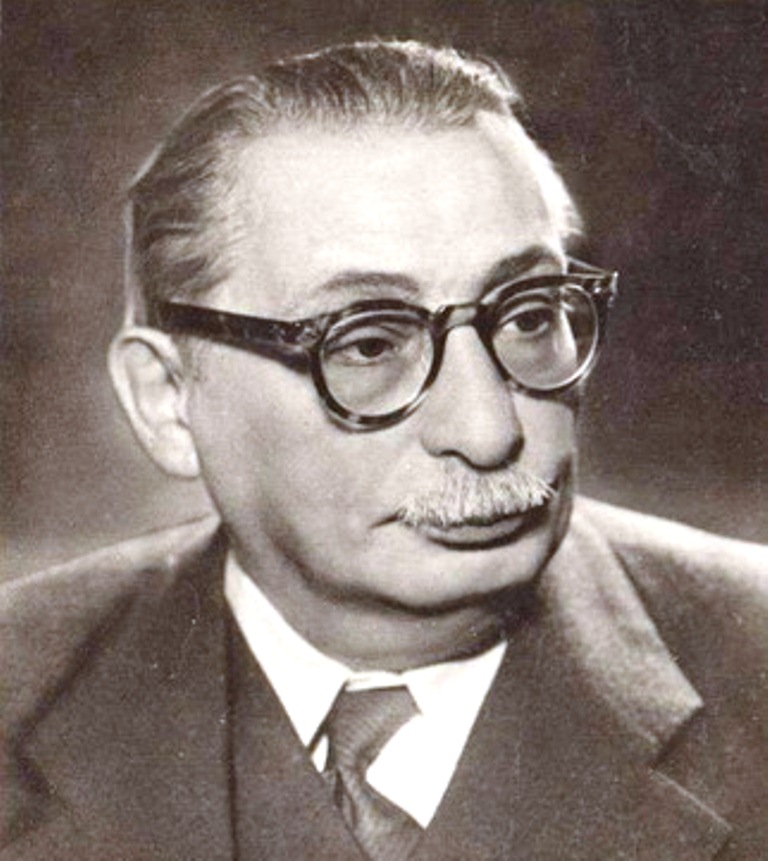

5th President of the Federal People's Assembly
- In office 28 January 1954 – 15 March 1957
- Preceded by: Milovan Đilas
- Succeeded by: Petar Stambolić

Vice President of the Federal Executive Council
- In office 14 January 1953 – 28 January 1954 Serving with Edvard Kardelj, Aleksandar Ranković, Milovan Đilas
- President: Josip Broz Tito

Personal details
- Born: 3 January 1890 [O.S. 22 December 1889] (Note: According to most sources, Pijada was born on 4 January 1890 (Gregorian calendar). But, Serbia was using the Julian (Old Style) calendar until 1919. Sources that use the Old Style all say that he was born on 22 December 1889. Pijade himself wrote that his 14th birthday was on 22 December 1903. In 19th century, the difference between Gregorian and Julian calendars was 12 days. Thus, 22 December 1889 corresponds to 3 January 1890 (see Conversion between Julian and Gregorian calendars). The misunderstanding stems from the fact that the difference between the calendars grew to 13 days after 1900, thus Pijade's birthday (22 December Old Style) only became 4 January New Style after 1900.) Belgrade, Kingdom of Serbia
- Died: 15 March 1957 (aged 67) Paris, France
- Party: Communist Party of Yugoslavia
- Spouse: Lepa Nešić Pijade
- Occupation: Painter, Art critic, Publicist, Revolutionary, Resistance commander, Statesman

Military service
- Allegiance: (Socialist Federal Republic of Yugoslavia) Federal People's Republic of Yugoslavia
- Branch/service: Yugoslav People's Army
- Rank: Major General of Yugoslav People's Army
- Commands: Yugoslav Partisans; Yugoslav People's Army
- Battles/wars: World War II

Moša Pijade (Cyrillic: Мoшa Пијаде, alternate English transliteration Moshe Piade; 3 January 1890 [O.S. 22 December 1889] – 15 March 1957), was a Serbian and Yugoslav painter, journalist, Communist Party politician, World War II participant, and a close collaborator of Josip Broz Tito. He was the full member of the Serbian Academy of Sciences and Arts. During the Interwar period in the Kingdom of Yugoslavia, Pijade was an accomplished painter, but spent almost 15 years in prison because of his communist activity. He took active role in the People's Liberation War and was one of main political leaders of the Partisans. After the WWII and creation of the Federal People's Republic of Yugoslavia, he became a prominent politician and was the president of the Federal People's Assembly of Yugoslavia from 1954 until his death.

== Life and career ==
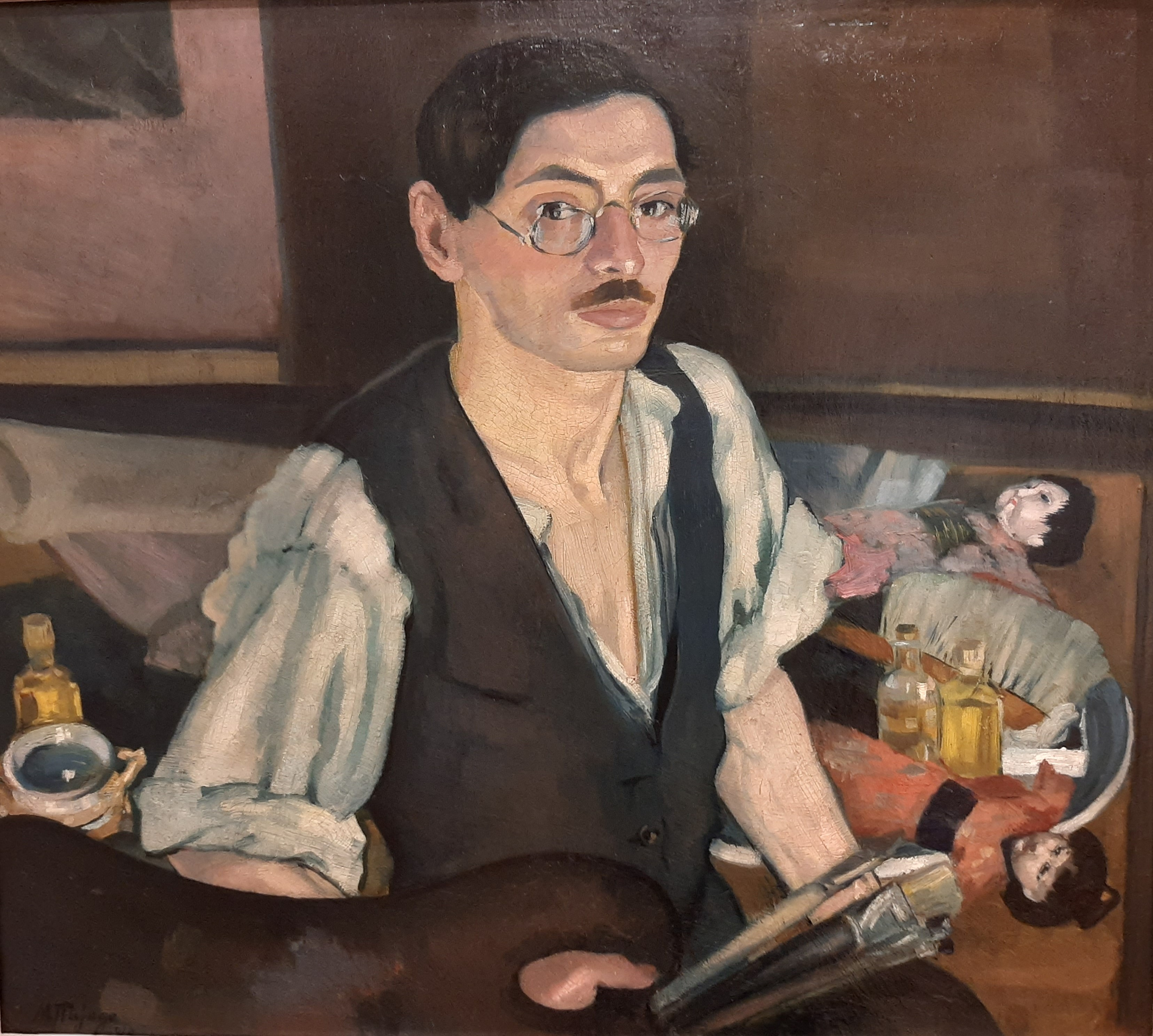
Self-portrait with Japanese Dolls. Painted in 1916, it was bought by the Ministry of Education in 1920 for the Prince Paul Museum. It was hanged in the museum until 1936, when it was removed because of Pijade's communist activity. Today, it is in the National Museum of Serbia.

Pijade was born in Belgrade, Kingdom of Serbia, on 3 January 1890 [O.S. 22 December 1889] into a family of Sephardic Jewish origin. His father Samuilo Pijade was a rich merchant. In 1905, Pijade started studying painting at the State School of Arts and Crafts in Belgrade, under the tutorship of painter Rista Vukanović. Soon, he left the school and moved to a private painting school run by Paško Vučetić. He helped Vučetić with the decoration of the walls of the National Bank of Serbia building. After that, he briefly returned to the School of Arts and Crafts, studying under Marko Murat. In 1906, Pijade moved to Munich, Germany to study painting. Soon after, his father went bankrupt, so Pijade could not afford to continue studies. He then moved to Paris, France in 1909 where he spent a year, and then moved to Brittany where he painted landscapes.

After returning to Belgrade in 1910, Pijade also became a journalist and political caricaturist. In 1913, he moved to Ohrid in then-southern Serbia, where he worked as an art teacher, but also taught French and German. When the World War I broke out in 1914, he volunteered to serve in the Serbian Army, but was refused. Next year, he moved back to Belgrade where he worked for the Pravda newspaper until the Austro-Hungarian occupation of Serbia in September 1915. During the occupation, Pijade worked as a waiter in Ćuprija and then as an advertising professional in Valjevo. He also painted several paintings in this period.

In 1919, in Belgrade, he established daily newspaper Slobodna reč ("Free word"). In 1920, he started to collaborate with the Communist Party of Yugoslavia (CPY) newspaper Radničke novine ("Workers' news"). The same year, he became the member of the CPY. At the elections for the city assembly of Belgrade held on 22 August 1920, Pijade was elected member of the assembly as a candidate of CPY. CPY won majority of seats and was expected to elect communist mayor (Filip Filipović) and municipal council, yet the government prevented them from taking their seats under the false pretext that they did not take the oath properly.

In 1922, Pijade was delegate at the second conference of the Balkan Communist Federation in Sofia, Bulgaria.

=== Ban of the CPY ===
In 1921, he became a member of the party's executive committee, after the previous committee was arrested due to a ban on communist activity. Soon, the CPY was banned altogether and went underground. In this period, he re-established Slobodna reč, now as a weekly. In 1923, in a bid to legalize their work, the communists established a cover party named Independent Workers' Party of Yugoslavia (IWPY), where Pijade became active. He was the editor of that party's newspaper Radnik ("The Worker"), and after Radnik was banned, he edited Okovani radnik ("Chained worker"). The IWPY won no seats at the 1923 and 1925 parliamentary elections. Eventually, the IWPY was banned, too. During the internal struggle between the "rightist" and "leftist" factions inside the CPY during the 1920s, Pijade opposed the rightists, who led the party at that time. He fervently argued for Leninism and Bolshevism.

After the ban of the IWPY, the CPY tasked Pijade with establishing a secret communist print shop in Belgrade. The print shop secretly published communist leaflets and a magazine called Komunist. In February 1925, the print shop was discovered by the police and Pijade was sentenced to 12 years in prison due to "anti-state activity" (Initially to 20 years, but reduced after an appeal). In 1934, while in prison, he was sentenced to two additional years because of communist activity in the prison. While in the Lepoglava Prison, Pijade met Josip Broz Tito, who was serving a five-year sentence. They remained close friends and associates until his death. Pijade served out his full sentence and was released in April 1939.

While in the Sremska Mitrovica Prison, Pijade translated Das Kapital by Karl Marx into Serbo-Croatian (under the pseudonym Porobić). He also translated The Communist Manifesto, The Poverty of Philosophy, and the introduction to A Contribution to the Critique of Political Economy. While he was imprisoned, some of Pijade's earlier paintings became part of collection of the Prince Paul Museum in Belgrade. In 1926, Pijade was allowed to paint in the Sremska Mitrovica prison, but only for few months. In this period, he painted a self-portrait, several portraits of fellow prisoners (including Rodoljub Čolaković) and still lives. After four years without painting, Pijade was again allowed to paint in 1930 in the Lepoglava prison. There, he painted two portraits of Tito and several landscapes. After that, he did not paint until 1936, when he was again allowed to paint for a short time in the Sremska Mitrovica prison.

After returning home in 1939, Pijade immediately continued his communist activities, so he was arrested again in January 1940 and taken to the Bileća prison. He was released in April 1940, only to be arrested again in February 1941. He was released on 4 April 1941, two days before the Axis invasion of Yugoslavia. After being released from prison in 1939, Pijade met and then married Lepa Nešić, a widow and member of the CPY. At the 5th National Conference of the CPY in October 1940, Pijade was elected member of the Central Committee.

During the nine months on freedom (April 1939 - January 1940), Pijade painted a lot. In the Bileća prison, he was allowed to paint a little, but after being released in April 1940, he continued painting and few of his paintings were even exhibited in the Cvijeta Zuzorić Art Pavilion in Belgrade.

=== World War II ===
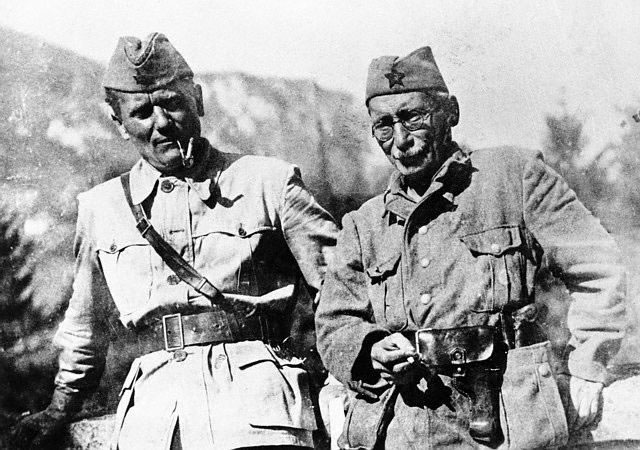
Tito and Moša Pijade in 1942

During the April War, Pijade relocated from Belgrade to Montenegro, where he was one of the leaders of the communist-led uprising against the Axis occupation (July 1941), which was part of the wider communist-led anti-Axis struggle. The uprising saw initial success, and most of the territory of Montenegro was temporarily liberated. Under the influence of Pijade and Milovan Đilas, Montenegrin Partisans pursued an extreme form of prosecution of perceived class enemies and those who were not willing to submit to the communist authorities. This policy was later condemned by the CPY and deemed "Leftist errors". During this period, many "enemies of the people" were killed by the Partisans.

In late 1941, Pijade was transferred to the main Partisan headquarters. There, he was not in charge of military actions, but was organizing supplies and administration of the liberated territories. In the meantime, almost all his family perished in the Holocaust. His sisters Šelika and Micika and brothers Josif and David were all killed in the Sajmište concentration camp in Belgrade, while his brother Velizar was shot in Niš. Pijade's wife Lepa was with him and the Partisans during the whole war.

Pijade was the main author of two documents that were adopted by the main headquarters in Foča on 3 February 1942. Those two documents, collectively known as the "Foča Regulations" defined the way in which Partisan-liberated territories were to be administrated by People's Liberation Councils, and the organization of those councils. Foča Regulations were later celebrated by the communists as the basis of the new post-war system of governance.

Pijade was one of the main organizers of the First session of the Anti-Fascist Council for the National Liberation of Yugoslavia (AVNOJ) in Bihać in November 1942. AVNOJ was the highest executive body of the communist-led People's Front. At the second session of AVNOJ in Jajce in November 1943, Pijade was elected its vice-president. Just before the Jajce session, Pijade initiated the foundation of Tanjug, Partisan news agency which, after the war, became the state news agency of Yugoslavia. Pijade said that one of the main tasks is to quickly inform the allied public about the AVNOJ session and its decisions, so to win their sympathy for Partisans' cause.

Pijade held high political posts during World War II and was a member of the Central Committee and the Politburo of the Communist Party of Yugoslavia, being one of leaders of Tito's partisans. His noms de guerre were Čiča Janko (Uncle Janko) and Šiki.

=== Later career ===
For his services during the war, Pijade was subsequently awarded the Order of the People's Hero of Yugoslavia, Order of People's Liberation, and the Commemorative Medal of the Partisans of 1941. He continued to maintain an important role in the government of the newly proclaimed Federal People's Republic of Yugoslavia. He was one of the Vice Presidents of the Temporary National Assembly (1945), vice president of the Presidium of the National Assembly (deputy head of state) between 1945 and 1953, vice-president of the Federal Executive Council (government) between 1953 and 1954, and then president of the Federal People's Assembly (1954–57).

In August 1945, Pijade delivered a report at the 3rd (last) session of AVNOJ. At the session, AVNOJ was transformed into the Temporary National Assembly and Moše Pijade stayed its vice-president. He was the chair of the Legislative committee of the Assembly. In September, he was named the chair of the council that was tasked with implementing agrarian reform. At the 1945 parliamentary election, he was elected member of the Constituent Assembly as a representative of the City of Belgrade constituency. He was member of the committee that was tasked with the preparation of the text of the new constitution that was eventually ratified as the 1946 Constitution of Yugoslavia. After new constitution was adopted, the Constituent Assembly was transformed into the National Assembly and Pijade was elected vice-president of the Presidium of the National Assembly, a post he held until it was abolished in 1953. In January 1953, Pijade was elected vice-president of the Federal Executive Council. He stayed on that post until January 1954, when he was elected president of the Federal National Assembly. He stayed on that post until his death.

At the 5th Congress of the Communist Party of Yugoslavia (July 1948), Pijade was re-elected member of the Central Committee and then was elected member of the 5th Politburo. During the Tito–Stalin split (1948) and the subsequent Informbiro period, Pijade strongly supported Tito's line. At the 6th Congress (November 1952), he was again elected member of the Central Committee and member of the 6th Executive Committee (former Politburo). In 1950, Pijade was admitted full member of the Serbian Academy of Sciences and Arts.

In 1948 Pijade convinced Tito to allow those Jews who remained in Yugoslavia to emigrate to Israel. Tito agreed on a one-time exception basis. As a result, 3,000 Jews emigrated from Yugoslavia to Israel on the SS Kefalos in December 1948. Among those was Tommy Lapid, who became Deputy Prime Minister of Israel and was the father of Yair Lapid.

During World War II, Pijade did not paint at all, only making a few drawings. But, after the war ended, he continued his artistic work. In the early 1950s, he acquired a painter's studio for the first time in his life. In 1952, he organized an exhibition of his works in his studio in Belgrade.

=== Death and legacy ===
On 15 March 1957, Pijade arrived to Paris from London, where he had talks as leader of a Yugoslav parliamentary delegation. The plane arrived to Le Bourget Airport around 1:30 PM. Pijade stayed with his wife at the residence of Yugoslav ambassador Aleš Bebler. In the afternoon, Pijade and his wife took a walk at the Parc Monceau. During the walk, he felt ill, so they returned to the residence. There, he tried to relax, but his condition worsened, so a doctor was called, but he could not help. Pijade died at 6:15 PM. The cause of death was reported as coronary thrombosis.

His body was transferred to Belgrade on 16 March and lay in state in the House of the Federal Assembly. On March 18, he was buried at the Tomb of People's Heroes inside the Belgrade Fortress. According to the official count, the state funeral was attended by 300,000 people. Tito, Lidija Šentjurc (vice-president of the Federal People's Assembly), Miloš Minić and Siniša Stanković gave eulogies. Following Pijade's death, Federal Executive Council declared five days of national mourning (March 15–19).

Streets and schools in many cities of the former Yugoslavia were once named after him. Many of those names were removed following the Breakup of Yugoslavia due to decommunization. In 1994, there were 22 elementary schools in Serbia named after Moša Pijade. As of 2024, eight of those schools are still named "Moša Pijade". There are around 40 streets in Serbia named after Pijade as of 2024. One street in Maribor is named "Moše Pijade".

Moša Pijade monument is located in front of the Politika a.d. building in downtown Belgrade. It was unveiled in 1969 and declared a cultural monument in 1987. A monument in Zagreb, authored by Antun Augustinčić, was unveiled in 1961, placed near an adult education college at the time named after Pijade, but the institution was since renamed and the monument moved in 1993 from that location in Trnje to an unrelated location in Maksimir, near the nursing home named after Lavoslav Schwarz. Another Moša Pijade monument is located in front of the AVNOJ Museum in Jajce. There is also a bust of Moša Pijade in Podgorica. The monument dedicated to Pijade in Sisak was removed after the breakup of Yugoslavia.

Pijade has been commemorated on Yugoslavian postage stamps twice. First, in 1968, as part of the "People's heroes" issue, and then in 1982 on the occasion of the fortieth anniversary of the Foča regulations.

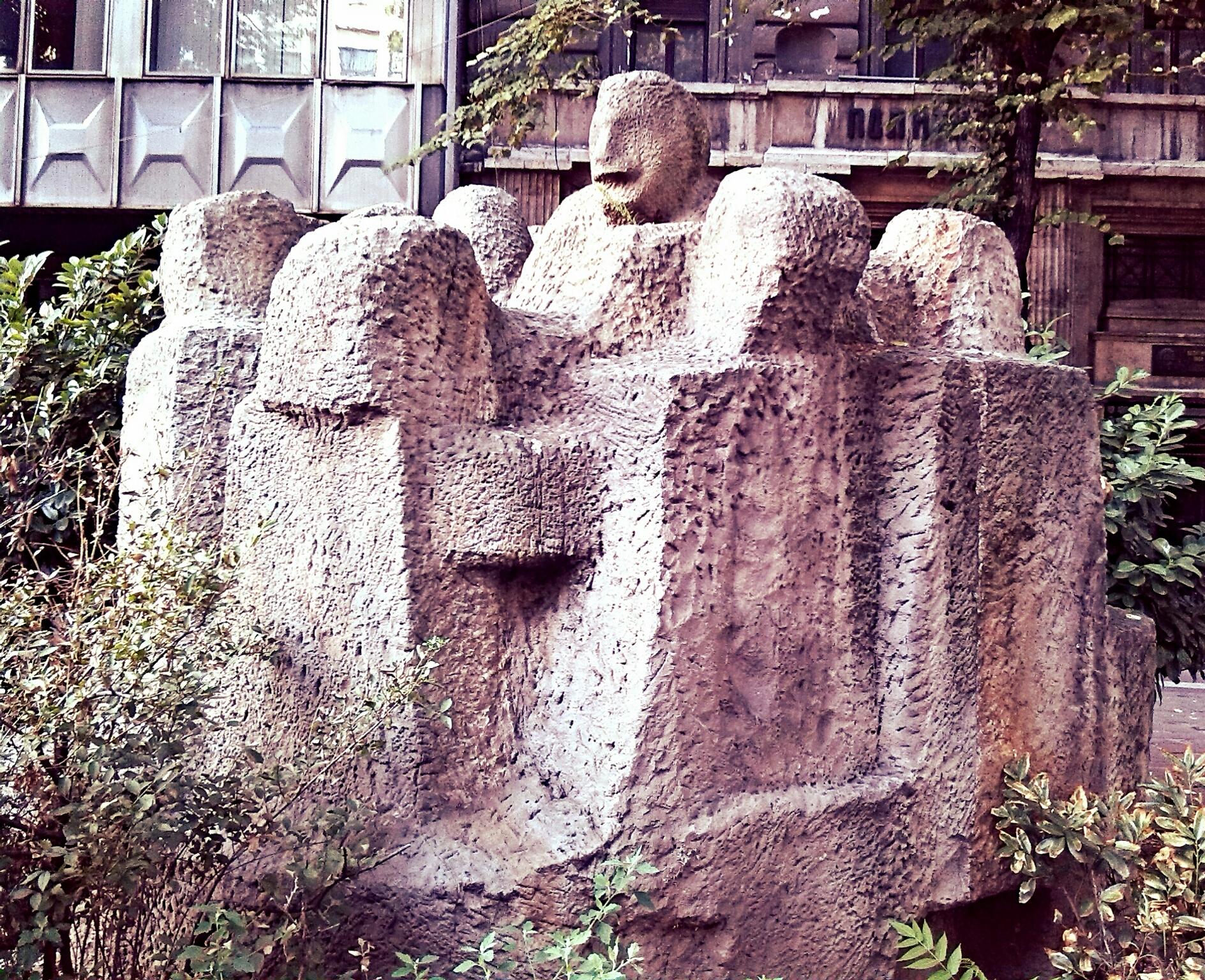
Moša Pijade monument in Belgrade

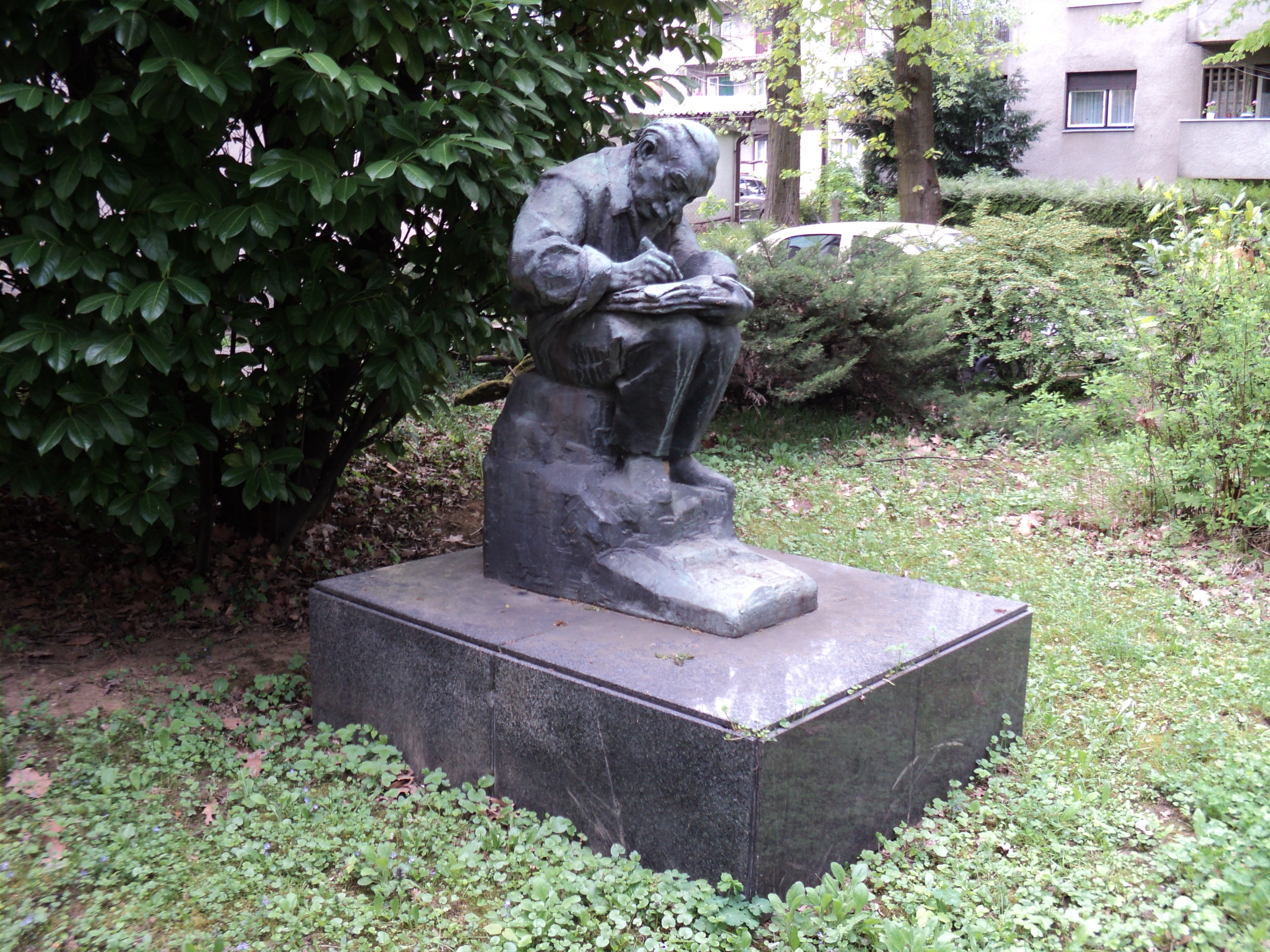
Monument in Zagreb by Antun Augustinčić

== Awards ==
- Order of the People's Hero (1953)
- Order of the Hero of Socialist Labour (1949)
- Order of People's Liberation (1945)
- Order of the Partisan Star, 1st class (1951)
- Order of the Brotherhood and Unity, 1st class (1947)
- Order of Bravery (1947)
- Commemorative Medal of the Partisans of 1941
- Albania:
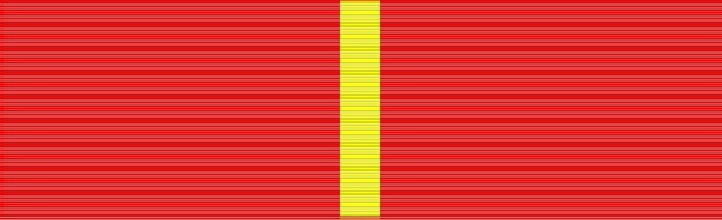
  - Order of Freedom, 1st class (1946)
- Egypt:
  - Grand Cordon of the Order of the Nile (1956)
- Ethiopia:
  - Order of the Holy Trinity
- Greece:
  - Order of George I
