= The Service =

1840 essay by Henry David Thoreau

"The Service" is an essay written in 1840 by Henry David Thoreau. He submitted it to The Dial for publication, but they declined to print it. It was not published until after Thoreau's death.

The essay uses war and military discipline as metaphors that, as Thoreau would have it, can instruct us in how to order and conduct our lives.

== Themes ==
"The Service" is in part a contrarian swipe at the many pacifist writers and lecturers whose teachings on "nonresistance" were then very much in vogue, in part thanks to Christian anarchist and pacifist Adin Ballou who spoke on the subject at the Concord Lyceum on occasion and who founded the New England Non-Resistance Society (of which William Lloyd Garrison was also a leader, and a Lyceum speaker as well).

Thoreau debated the subject "Is it ever proper to offer forcible resistance?" in a formal Lyceum debate (arguing the affirmative) in 1841, and surviving records of the Lyceum note that the subject came up many times in debates, discussions, and lectures.

Thoreau's own views were very much influenced by these non-resistants, and are often confused with them even today. When Amos Bronson Alcott resisted his taxes to protest war and slavery, three years before Thoreau would resist his taxes over the same issues, Alcott's action was explained within the context of "non-resistant" philosophy. When Thoreau explained his own tax resistance, he took pains to distinguish his theory from theirs, titling his essay Resistance to Civil Government.

In "The Service", Thoreau tosses barbs at the non-resistance preachers, warning his readers that pacifism can be a temptation to passivity:

Better that we have some of that testy spirit of knight errantry, and if we are so blind as to think the world is not rich enough nowadays to afford a real foe to combat, with our trusty swords and double-handed maces, hew and mangle some unreal phantom of the brain. In the pale and shivering fogs of the morning, gathering them up betimes, and withdrawing sluggishly to their daylight haunts, I see Falsehood sneaking from the full blaze of truth, and with good relish could do execution on their rearward ranks, with the first brand that came to hand. We too are such puny creatures as to be put to flight by the sun, and suffer our ardor to grow cool in proportion as his increases; our own short-lived chivalry sounds a retreat with the fumes and vapors of the night; and we turn to meet mankind, with its meek face preaching peace, and such non-resistance as the chaff that rides before the whirlwind.

Of such sort, then, be our crusade, – which, while it inclines chiefly to the hearty good will and activity of war, rather than the insincerity and sloth of peace, will set an example to both of calmness and energy; – as unconcerned for victory as careless of defeat, – not seeking to lengthen our term of service, nor to cut it short by a reprieve, – but earnestly applying ourselves to the campaign before us.

== Sources ==
- My Thoughts are Murder to the State by Henry David Thoreau (ISBN 978-1434804266)
- The Service by Henry David Thoreau (ISBN 978-1410104700)
- The Higher Law: Thoreau on Civil Disobedience and Reform (ISBN 978-0691118765)
- Collected Essays and Poems by Henry David Thoreau (ISBN 978-1-88301195-6)
