= Boris Kidrič =

Slovenian communist politician and revolutionary

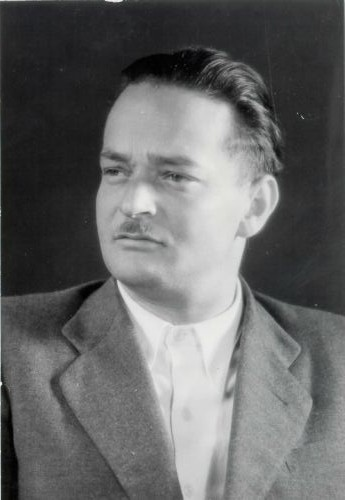

Prime Minister of Slovenia
- In office 5 May 1945 – June 1946
- President: Josip Vidmar
- Preceded by: Position Established
- Succeeded by: Miha Marinko

Personal details
- Born: 10 April 1912 Vienna, Austria-Hungary
- Died: 11 April 1953 (aged 41) Belgrade, PR Serbia, Yugoslavia
- Party: League of Communists

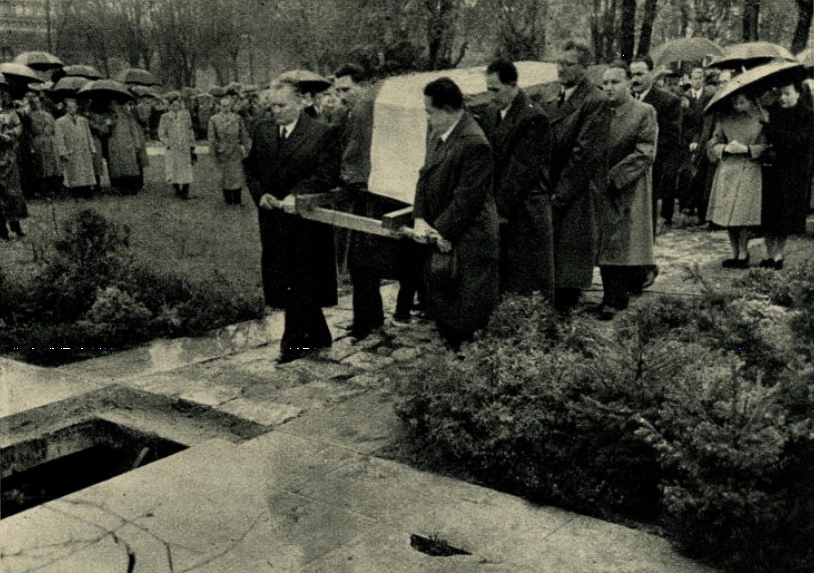
Boris Kidrič burial in 1953.

Boris Kidrič (10 April 1912 – 11 April 1953) was a Slovene and Yugoslav politician and revolutionary who was one of the chief organizers of the Slovene Partisans, the Slovene resistance against occupation by Nazi Germany and Fascist Italy after Operation Barbarossa in June 1941. He became the de facto leader of the Liberation Front of the Slovenian People. As such, he had a crucial role in the anti-Fascist liberation struggle in Slovenia between 1941 and 1945. After World War II he was, together with Edvard Kardelj, a leading Slovenian politician in communist Yugoslavia.

== Early life ==
Kidrič was born in Vienna, then capital of the Austro-Hungarian Empire, as the son of the prominent Slovene liberal literary critic France Kidrič. He became a communist while still a teenager, aged fifteen, and was arrested for his writings, as well as for organisational and agitative work among Slovene factory workers, subsequently serving a year's prison term before having even reached the age of twenty.

== Political career ==
In the early 1930s, Kidrič was drafted by the communist publicist Vlado Kozak to join the Communist Party of Yugoslavia. He soon rose to high political posts in the Drava Banovina and was among the founders of the autonomous Communist Party of Slovenia in 1937. While in Vienna, where the CPY's Central Committee was based for a time, he was arrested by Austrian police in 1936 following an increase in pressure on communists by Chancellor Kurt Schuschnigg.

During the Second World War, Kidrič, alongside Milovan Đilas and Ivan Milutinović, was one of the major exponents of the policy of leftist errors. He also led a successful resistance movement within the Slovene Partisans.

After the end of World War II, the Slovenian National Liberation Council appointed him as the first president of the Slovenian socialist government and he moved into the Ebenspanger Mansion, which the communist government had confiscated from its previous Jewish owners. Very early on, in May 1945, he became the head of the Ministry of Education in Slovenia, which was said to have had a greater level of autonomy from the central government in Belgrade than the ministries of other Yugoslav republics.

Kidrič attended negotiations in Moscow following the end of the war, and then noted that the Soviet government under Joseph Stalin perceived Yugoslavia not as an equal socialist state, but as a part of its own sphere of influence. In the fall of 1950, he was recorded as having spoken of being "duped" by the Soviets in the past.

He became a member of the Yugoslav Politburo in 1948, and was in charge of the Yugoslav economy from 1946 until his death.

Alongside Edvard Kardelj, Vladimir Bakarić, Milovan Djilas, and Moša Pijade, he took part in the drafting of the 1950 "Basic Law on the Management of State Economic Enterprises", which laid the foundations for the Yugoslav system of workers' self-management. These and other reforms were meant to win popular support, and involve the working people more intimately in government and economy, in contrast to the then-prevailing Stalinist form of socialism. Kidrič, in an influential speech, said that the working masses had to “have their say directly and daily, and not only by way of the vanguard of their political parties."

Kidrič was also the main architect of the first five-year plan for economic development from 1947 to 1952, after which there would be a massive shift towards the development of heavy industries and the production and export of armaments. In particular, he was also concerned with the economic disparities between the various Yugoslav republics, a chronic issue that would haunt Yugoslavia for the entirety of its history; in connection to this, Kidrič said that the foundational privilege brotherhood and unity "categorically demands elimination of this unevenness."

In 1953, he died from leukemia in Belgrade.

== Honours and awards ==
He was awarded the Order of the People's Hero, Order of the Hero of Socialist Labour, Order of the People's Liberation and the Commemorative Medal of the Partisans of 1941. The National Institute of Chemistry in Ljubljana was named after him and until 1990 the main award for scientific achievements in Slovenia was called "Kidrič Prize". Consequently, there was also a Boris Kidrič Fund, which was based in Ljubljana.

Among the foreign decorations were the Soviet Union's Order of Kutuzov, 2nd class, the Hungarian Order of the Republic, the Bulgarian Order of the People's Freedom and the Polish Partisan Cross. After his death, the eastern Slovenian industrial town of Strnišče was renamed Kidričevo in his honour. In 1959, a large monument was erected in his honour in front of the Slovenian Government Office in Ljubljana, where it still stands despite some protests by anti-Communist groups and victims of Communist persecution. The Institute for Physics, near Belgrade, was renamed in his honour.

Political offices
Preceded by Minister for Slovenia; Edvard Kocbek	Prime Minister of Slovenia; 5 May 1945–1 June 1946	Succeeded by Miha Marinko

== Sources ==
- Janko Prunk, "Kidrič, Boris - Peter" in Enciklopedija Slovenije (Ljubljana: Mladinska knjiga, 1987–2002), book 5, 62-63.
- Božo Repe, Rdeča Slovenija (Ljubljana: Sophia, 2003).
- Banac, Ivo (1988). With Stalin Against Tito: Cominformist Splits in Yugoslav Communism. Cornell University Press. ISBN 0-8014-2186-1.
