= Franc Leskošek =

Yugoslav politician (1897–1983)

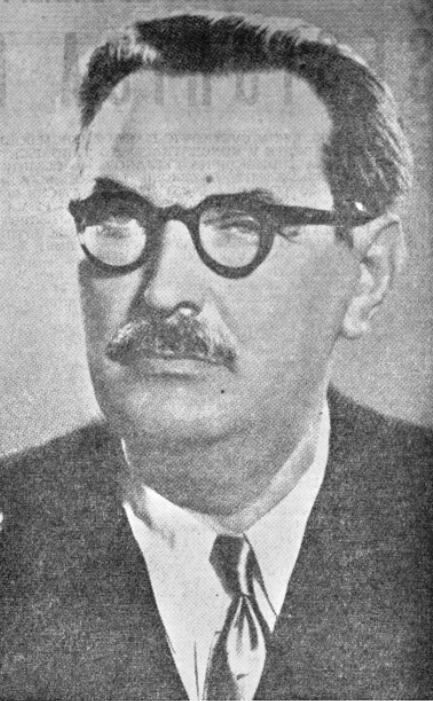
- Franc Leskošek in 1959

Secretary of the League of Communists of Slovenia
- In office 1937–1945
- Preceded by: Position Established
- Succeeded by: Boris Kidrič

Personal details
- Born: 9 December 1897 Celje, Austria-Hungary
- Died: 5 June 1983 (aged 85) Ljubljana, PR Slovenia, Yugoslavia
- Party: League of Communists

Franc Leskošek (nom de guerre Luka; 9 December 1897 – 5 June 1983) was a Yugoslav politician and Partisan commander.

== Biography ==
Born in Celje, Slovenia, Leskošek worked as a locksmith in his youth. He was drafted into the Austro-Hungarian Army during World War I and fought mostly on the Isonzo Front. After the war he returned to his hometown and became active in the trade union movement and participated in many strikes.

Leskošek joined the Communist Party of Yugoslavia (KPJ) and in 1926 and became a member of its Central Committee in 1934. He was secretary of the Association of Metalworkers for Slovenia and chairman of the expert commission of the United Workers' Trade Unions of Slovenia. During this period he successfully hid his KPJ membership from Yugoslav authorities.

In 1935 he traveled to the Soviet Union alongside Edvard Kardelj and became a functionary in the Communist International and was appointed a member of the Politburo of the KPJ in 1936 at a conference held in Moscow. After the appointment of Josip Tito as the general secretary of the KPJ, Leskošek became one of the leading members of the party. At the fourth congress of the Communist Party of Slovenia, he was elected the first secretary of the party.

During the final elections in Yugoslavia, he participated as a member of the United Opposition. After 1940 he avoided arrest by retiring the KPJ in time. He resumed his illegal activities and was once again elected to KPJ leadership.

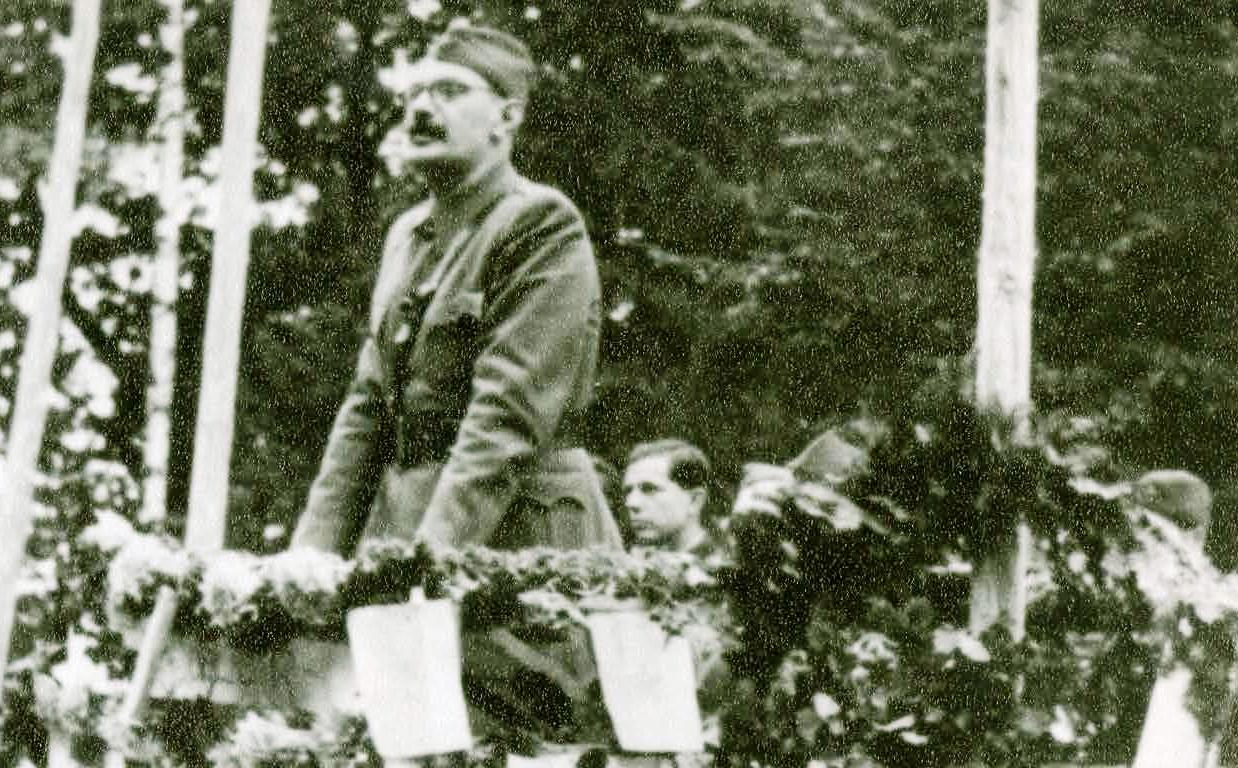
Leskošek giving a speech during a rally in Bočna, October 1944

After the creation of the Slovene Partisan units, Leskošek was appointed commander of its main staff. After the war and communist takeover of Yugoslavia, he remained first secretary of the KPS until 1945 and was also president of the Assembly of the Delegates of the Slovene Nation.

He was the minister of industry and mining in the first Slovenian government. From 1948 to 1951, he was the federal Yugoslav minister of heavy industry. From 1951 to 1953, he was the chairman of the Council for Industrialization of Slovenia, and then until 1958 he was a member of the executive committee of the National Group of the Federal People's Republic of Yugoslavia (FNRJ). From 1958 to 1963, he was the vice-chairman of the People's Group of the FNRJ and from 1963 he was a member of the Federation Council. From 1945 to 1963, he was a member of the Slovenian group and from 1946 to 1953 and 1958 to 1963 of the federal group.

He was a member of the executive committee of the Central Committee of the League of Communists of Slovenia (CK ZKS) from 1956 to 1966, and then (1966 to 1968) he was a member of the presidency of CK ZKS. Until 1964 he was a member of the Politburo of the Central Committee of the League of Communists of Yugoslavia (CK ZKJ) and until 1969 a member of the CK ZKJ. From 1953 he was a member of the Main Department of the Socialist Alliance of Working People of Yugoslavia (SSRNJ) and from 1967 he was a member of the presidency of the Slovenian Republican Conference of the SSRNJ.

Leskošek died in Ljubljana on 5 June 1983.
