= Miha Marinko =

Yugoslavian and Slovenian revolutionary and Communist statesman (1900-1983)

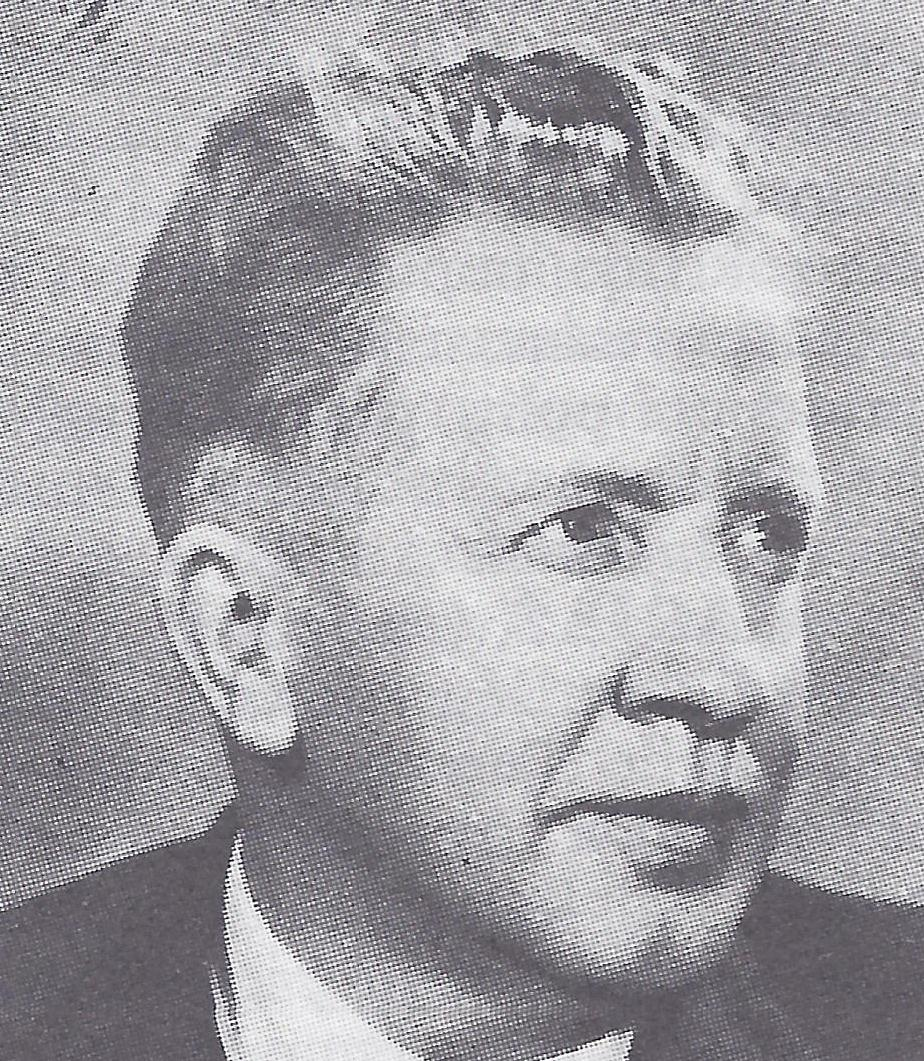
Miha Marinko

Miha Marinko (8 September 1900 – 19 August 1983) was a Slovenian and Yugoslavian revolutionary and communist statesman who served as Prime Minister of Slovenia from June 1946 to 1953. During the latter part of 1953, he served as the president of the executive council, in the same role as prime minister. On this position he succeeded Boris Kidrič and was succeeded by Boris Kraigher. He was also (political) secretary of the League of Communists of Slovenia from 1946 to 1966, member of presidency of Central Committee of the Communist Party of Yugoslavia 1966-69 and chairman of Slovene people˙s assembly (republic parliament) from 1953 to 1962.
