= League of Communists of Croatia =

League of Communists of Croatia Savez komunista Hrvatske
- Leader: President of the League of Communists of Croatia
- Founded: 1 August 1937
- Dissolved: 3 November 1990
- Preceded by: Provincial Committee KPJ of Croatia and Slavonia
- Succeeded by: Social Democratic Party
- Headquarters: Zagreb, SR Croatia, Yugoslavia
- Ideology: Communism; Marxism–Leninism; Titoism
- Political position: Left-wing to far-left
- National affiliation: League of Communists of Yugoslavia
- Colours: Red

Party flag
- Politics of Croatia; Political parties; Elections; Croatian branch of the League of Communists of Yugoslavia

League of Communists of Croatia (Serbo-Croatian: Savez komunista Hrvatske, SKH) was the Croatian branch of the League of Communists of Yugoslavia (SKJ). It came into power in 1945. Until 1952, it was known as the Communist Party of Croatia (Komunistička partija Hrvatske, KPH). The party dissolved in 1990.

== History ==
=== Kingdom of Yugoslavia ===
The party was formally founded in 1937 with Pavle Gregorić as its first general secretary. The reasons for the KPJ to have a specifically Croatian branch were partly ideological, partly practical. Croatia, just as Slovenia, which would have its Communist Party at the same time, was the most industrialised part of the country, with the biggest percentage of the working class in the population, and, therefore, more likely to adopt communism than rural Serbia.

The other, more practical, reason was in the increased marginalisation of Communists in Croatian political life due to public more preoccupied with ethnic issues and position of Croatia within Yugoslavia (cf. Croatia in the first Yugoslavia). Territorial aspirations of Fascist Italy towards Croatian parts of Yugoslavia also presented opportunity for the creation of broad Communist-dominated alliances modelled on the Popular Front.

Prior to the formation of the Communist Party of Croatia there was a Croatian-Slavonian Provincial Committee of the Socialist Workers Party of Yugoslavia (Communists) and there was a developed party structure of the Socialist Party of Croatia and Slavonia. Dalmatia had its own structures up to 1937.

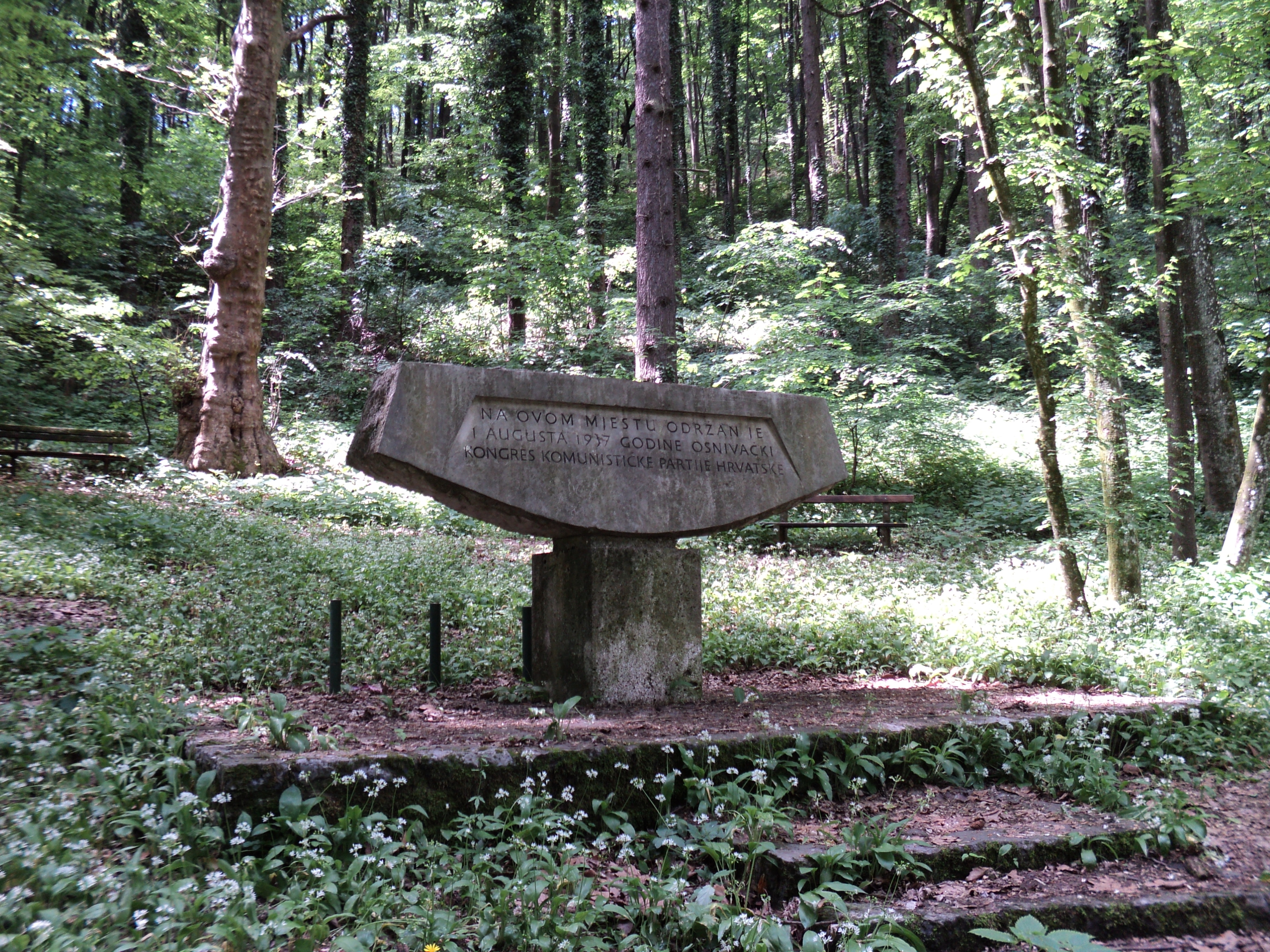
Monument in Anindol, built at the establishment place of the Communist party of Croatia in 1937.

The KPH, just like the KPJ, was illegal and, therefore, remained marginalised, especially after the 1939 Cvetković–Maček Agreement and the creation of the banovina of Croatia within the Kingdom of Yugoslavia.

The party's fortunes dramatically changed with the 1941 Axis invasion of Yugoslavia and the creation of the Independent State of Croatia. At the beginning of the Axis occupation of Yugoslavia, Aleksandar Ranković was secretary of the Central Committee of the Communist Party of Croatia. Although the KPH had many of its leading figures arrested and killed by the new regime, it remained strong enough to form what would become the only truly effective resistance movement in Croatia – the Partisans. The KPH was based on ideological rather than ethnic grounds and, therefore, had support in both ethnic Croat and ethnic Serb areas. This allowed Josip Broz Tito's Partisans to mount an ultimately successful guerrilla campaign. The KPH platform of a post-war reorganisation of Yugoslavia on federal grounds also attracted many non-Communist Croatians to its cause, especially in the later stages of the war.

=== SFR Yugoslavia ===
Flag of Croatia within Yugoslavia

In 1945 Yugoslavia was indeed federalised with Croatia becoming a republic, but its nominal autonomy was of little importance with the KPJ being heavily centralised and the KPH – reformed into the SKH in 1952 – being its integral part.

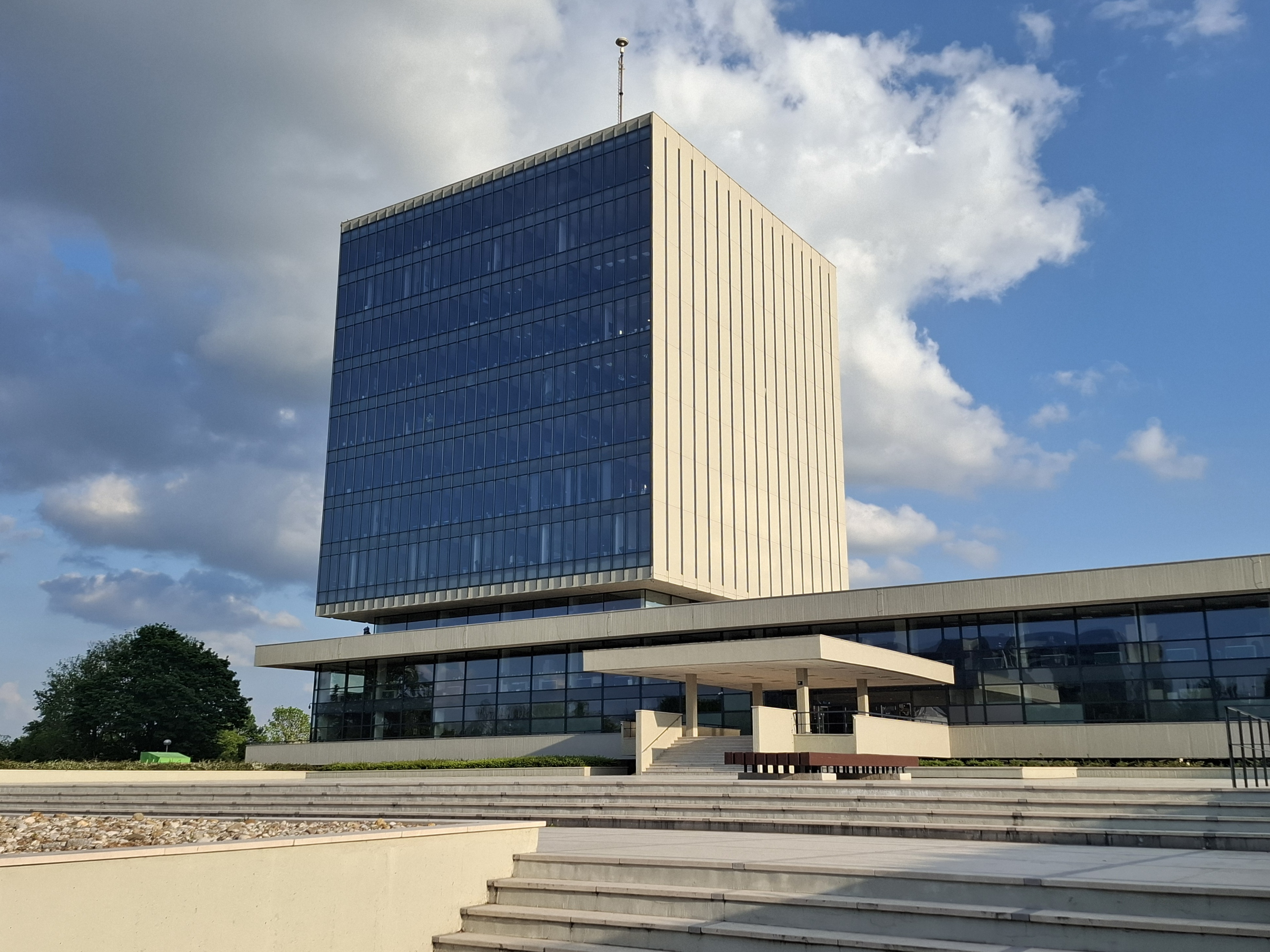
The Kockica Building ("little cube"). Former headquarters of the League of Communists of Croatia in Zagreb.

Things began to change in the late 1960s with Tito allowing for reformist policies embodying a new generation of Communist leaders. This generation included SKH leaders Savka Dabčević-Kučar and Miko Tripalo, who would start a movement called the Croatian Spring, advocating for more autonomy of Croatia within Yugoslavia. They advocated against centralism which disproportionately benefited the eastern parts of Yugoslavia, especially Serbia and SR Macedonia.

The movement, however, created a lot of ethnic tension and increasing opposition from the more conservative Party members. In December 1971, at the Karađorđevo conference of the SKJ, Tito publicly distanced himself from Croatian Spring, leading to the end of the movement. Using the alleged Croatian nationalism as a pretext, the SKH was subsequently purged of most of its liberal and reformist elements.

As a result, the SKH in the 1970s became one of the most conservative sections of the SKJ and remained interested in maintaining the ideological and political status quo even when other branches of the SKJ began to explore new ideas.

Because of that, the SKH in late 1980s was slow to react when the League of Communists of Serbia under Slobodan Milošević aimed to reassert Serbian interests. The SKH began to openly condemn Milošević only in 1989 after Serbian nationalist demonstrations in areas that would later become the Republic of Serbian Krajina.

It is estimated that in the 1980s, during its zenith, the SKH had around 300-400,000 members. Subsequent surveys showed that most of the membership left the party in 1990, with only a minority remaining active in politics. Of those, a majority joined the HDZ.

=== Party of Democratic Changes ===
With increasingly apparent prospect of SKH being forced to allow some form of multi-party democracy and having its power tested on free elections, the party changed policy and quickly adopted a new reformist platform and pushed for the constitutional amendments allowing the first free elections in 1990.

In January 1990 the Croatian Party delegation led by Ivica Račan left the 14th Congress of the SKJ, a few hours after the Slovenian Party delegation did so over a row with the Serbian Party delegation.

In the next few months, the SKH tried very hard to present itself as a modern and reformist party, rebranding itself into a new party called the League of Communists of Croatia – Party of Democratic Changes (Savez komunista Hrvatske – Stranka demokratskih promjena, SKH-SDP), then to just the Party of Democratic Changes (Stranka demokratskih promjena, SDP).

Those and other changes, however, weren't very convincing to the Croatian electorate and the SKH lost power to Croatian Democratic Union of Franjo Tuđman.

In 1991, it was renamed to the Socialdemocratic Party of Croatia–Party of Democratic Changes (Socijaldemokratska partija Hrvatske–Stranka demokratskih promjena, SDPH), that would ultimately become the Social Democratic Party of Croatia in 1993.

== Ethno-nationalist issues ==
Another reason why the party lost support in Croatia was because it was accused of being dominated by the Serb minority. Serb influence was indeed disproportionate at times. In 1989, 30% of members of the Croatian League of Communists were Serbs, while their overall percentage in the republic was less than 13%.

Serbs held the presidency of the party twice, one up to 1942 with Rade Končar, the other from 1986 until 1989 by Stanko Stojčević.

=== Ethnic composition of the governments ===
Government of April 14, 1945

- 5 Croats
- 1 Serb
- 8 members of unknown or undeclared ethnicity

Government of October 22, 1949

- 13 Croats
- 3 Serbs
- 1 Yugoslav
- 7 members of unknown or undeclared ethnicity

Executive Committee of February 7, 1953

- 18 Croats
- 3 Serbs
- 3 members of unknown or undeclared ethnicity

Executive Committee Spring 1958

- 16 Croats
- 2 Serbs
- 6 members of unknown or undeclared ethnicity

Executive Committee of 1963

- 5 Croats
- 6 members of unknown or undeclared ethnicity

== Party leaders ==
1. Andrija Hebrang (1942 – October 1944) (1899–1949)
2. Vladimir Bakarić (October 1944 – 1969) (1912–1983)
3. Savka Dabčević-Kučar (1969–1971) (1923–2009)
4. Milka Planinc (14 December 1971 – May 1982) (1924–2010)
5. Jure Bilić (May 1982 – 1 July 1983) (1922–2006)
6. Josip Vrhovec (1 July 1983 – 15 May 1984) (1926–2006)
7. Mika Špiljak (15 May 1984 – May 1986) (1916–2007)
8. Stanko Stojčević (May 1986 – December 1989) (1929-2009)
9. Ivica Račan (13 December 1989 – 3 November 1990) (1944–2007)

== Revival ==
On 29 November 2004 – the date specifically chosen as Republic Day, former public holiday in socialist Yugoslavia – a group of Socialist Labour Party of Croatia dissidents in Vukovar tried to found new political party called Communist Party of Croatia, but in the end they failed to register and organize. A new Communist Party of Croatia was founded in 2013 and became a registered party in the same year.

This new party should not be mistaken with KPH/SKH, because, unlike the Social Democratic Party of Croatia, it is not its formal successor.

== Congresses ==
Congress of the League of Communists of Croatia
Congress	Start date	End date	Duration	Location
1st	1 August	2 August 1937	2 days	Samobor
2nd	21 November	25 November 1948	5 days	Zagreb
3rd	26 May	28 May 1954	3 days	Zagreb
4th	7 April	10 April 1959	4 days	Zagreb
5th	26 April	29 April 1965	4 days	Zagreb
6th	5 December	7 December 1968	3 days	Zagreb
7th	7 April	9 April 1974	3 days	Zagreb
8th	24 April	26 April 1978	3 days	Zagreb
9th	13 May	16 May 1982	4 days	Zagreb
10th	16 May	18 May 1986	3 days	Zagreb
11th	11 December	13 December 1989	3 days	Zagreb
12th	3 November 1990		1 day	Zagreb

== See also ==
- History of Croatia
- League of Communists of Yugoslavia
  - League of Communists of Bosnia and Herzegovina
  - League of Communists of Macedonia
  - League of Communists of Montenegro
  - League of Communists of Serbia
    - League of Communists of Vojvodina
    - League of Communists of Kosovo
  - League of Communists of Slovenia
- List of leaders of communist Yugoslavia
- Praxis School

== Sources ==
- Glišić, Venceslav; Borković, Milan (1975). Komunistička partija Jugoslavije u Srbiji 1941-1945. Rad.
