= Ivan Gošnjak =

Yugoslav communist politician (1909–1980)

Ivan Gošnjak Иван Гошњак
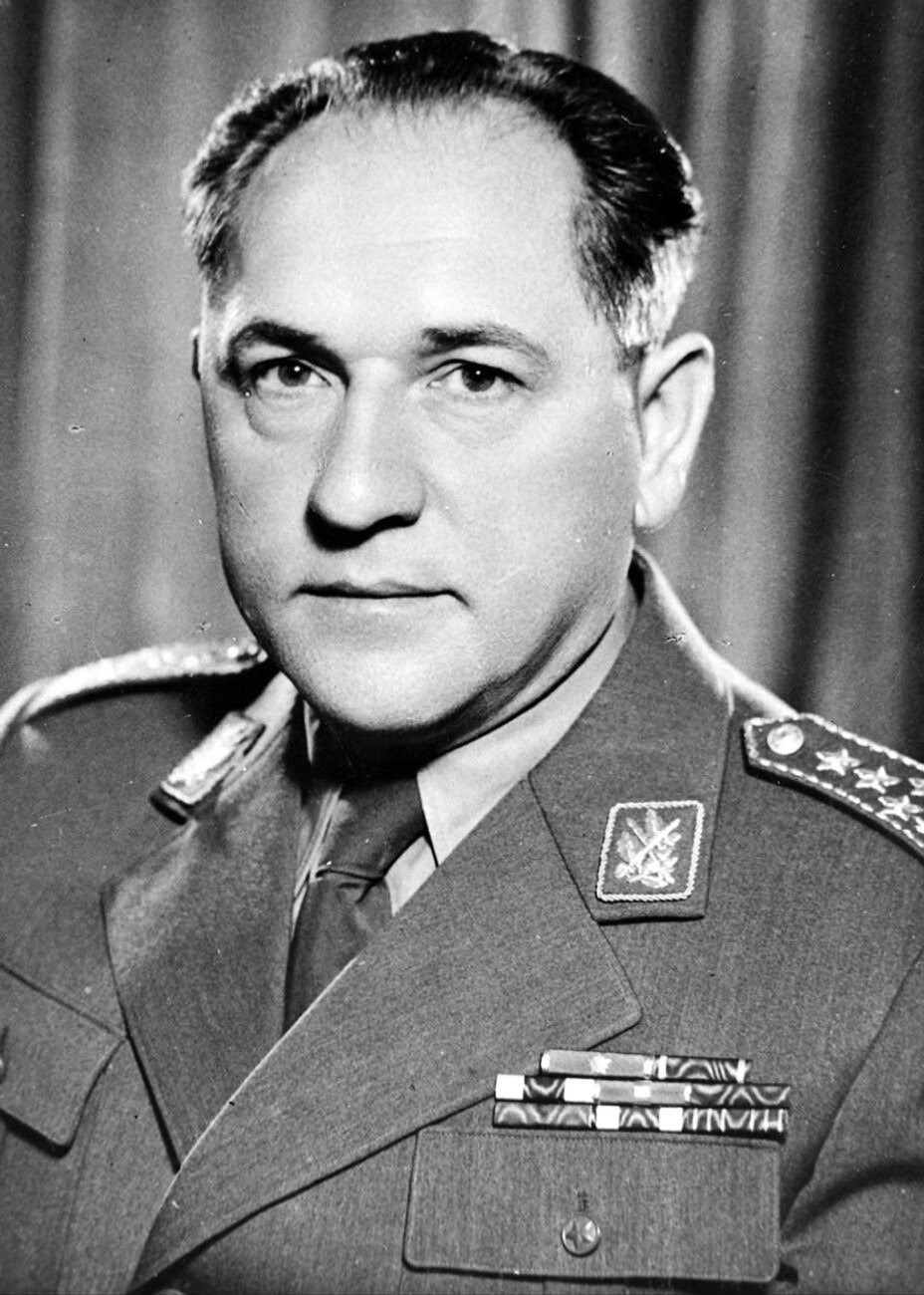
- Ivan Gošnjak, 1964.

2nd Federal Secretary of People's Defence of Yugoslavia
- In office 14 January 1953 – 18 May 1967
- Preceded by: Josip Broz Tito
- Succeeded by: Nikola Ljubičić

Personal details
- Born: 10 June 1909 Ogulin, Croatia-Slavonia, Austria-Hungary
- Died: 8 February 1980 (aged 70) Belgrade, SR Serbia, SFR Yugoslavia
- Party: SKJ
- Spouse: Tea Gošnjak
- Awards: Order of Freedom; Order of National Hero of Yugoslavia

Military service
- Allegiance: Socialist Federal Republic of Yugoslavia
- Branch/service: International Brigades; Yugoslav People's Army
- Years of service: 1937–1939; 1941–1974
- Rank: General of the Army
- Commands: Yugoslav People's Army
- Battles/wars: Spanish Civil War; World War II

Ivan Gošnjak (10 June 1909 – 8 February 1980) was a Croatian and Yugoslav communist who held numerous important offices in Yugoslavia during and after World War II, serving as the Minister of Defence from 1953 to 1967.

== Early life and interwar years ==
Ivan Gošnjak was a carpenter by profession and joined the Communist Party of Yugoslavia in 1933. In 1935 Gošnjak was sent to Moscow and was enrolled for one year at the Lenin School where he also attended lectures by "comrade Walter", better known by his World War II-era codename Tito. In 1936 Gošnjak was sent to a military barracks in Ryazan where he was given the designation "Number 36", instead of his real name and was given military instruction before being sent as a volunteer to the Spanish Civil War in January 1937. A great admirer of Joseph Stalin, Gošnjak was appointed captain in the International Brigades. After the defeat of the republican forces in Spain, Gošnjak was detained in France in 1939.

== World War Two ==
After the capitulation of France in 1940 Gošnjak escaped from the camp, going in 1941 to Germany as a worker. In Germany he used a fake passport, and in July 1942 returned to Croatia and immediately joined Tito's partisans.

As a Spanish civil war veteran, he was given command of all Croatian Partisan units, regrouped in the 4th (Croatian) Corps, in 1943. Gošnjak was appointed as deputy commander-in-chief at the end of the war, a post which he held until 1950.

== Post-war career ==
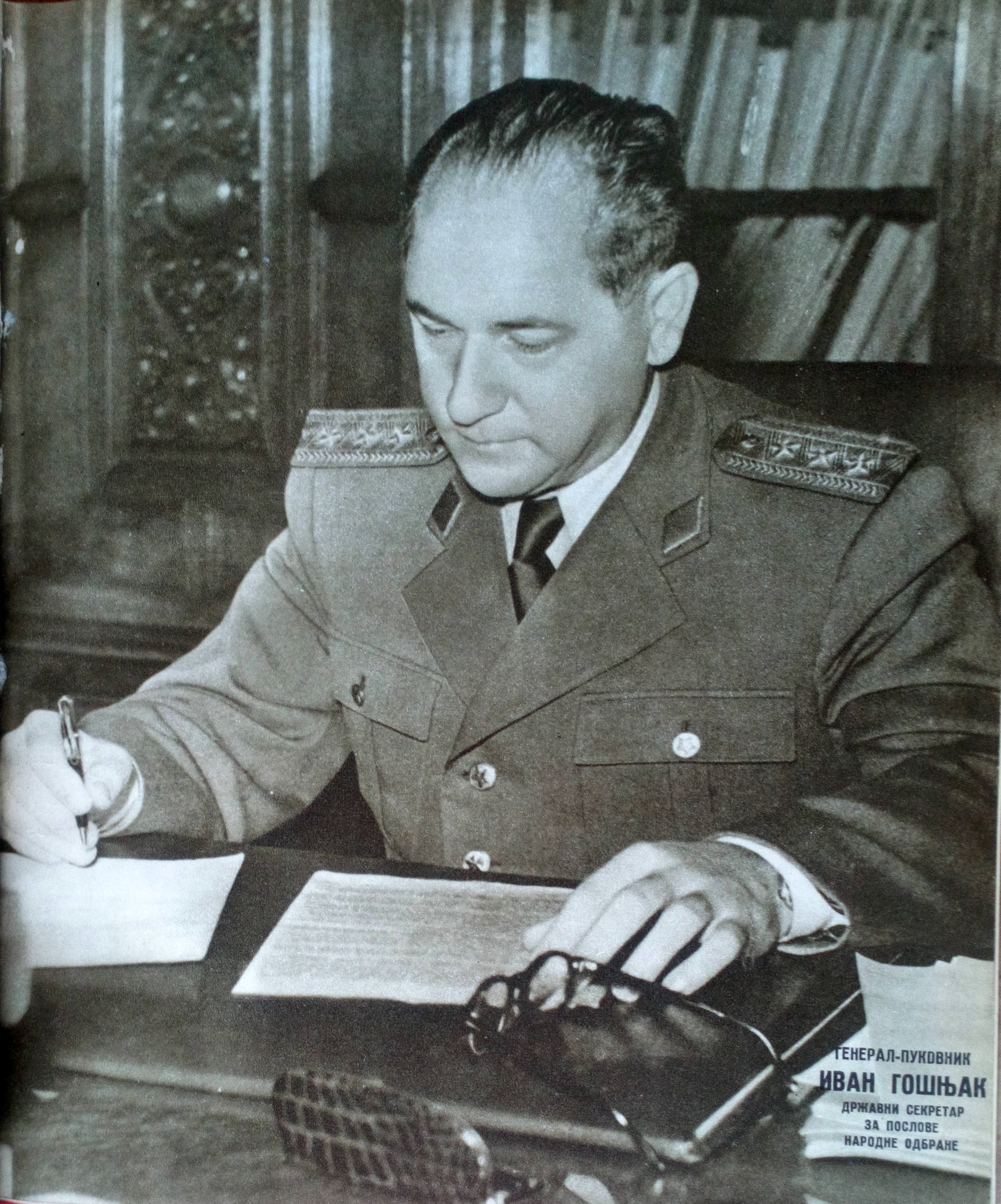
Ivan Gošnjak, colonel general and Federal Secretary of People's Defence of Yugoslavia, 1953.

In 1946, Tito wanted to send him to complete his military studies at the Soviet Voroshilov Military Academy, but Gošnjak asked him for permission to stay in Belgrade and work in the Central Committee. Tito agreed and later appointed him as deputy Defence Minister (1950–1953). At the Fifth Yugoslav CP congress Gošnjak was elected a member of the Politburo and later was made a member of the Executive Committee (the new name for the Politburo), elected at the sixth (1952), seventh (1958), and eighth (1964) party congresses. In 1953 Gošnjak became Defence Minister, a post which he held until 1967 when he was replaced by General of the Army Nikola Ljubičić. In 1963, he was considered for promotion to the rank of general but was never promoted.

== Later life ==
General Ivan Gošnjak retired from active military service in 1974, and was later appointed to serve on the Council of Federation, an advisory body to President Tito. He is buried in the Alley of Distinguished Citizens in Belgrade, Serbia.

Political offices
Preceded by Josip Broz Tito	Federal Secretary of People's Defence of Yugoslavia; 14 January 1953 – 18 May 1967	Succeeded by Nikola Ljubičić
