= League of Communists of Slovenia =

League of Communists of Slovenia Zveza komunistov Slovenije Savez komunista Slovenije
- Leader: General Secretary of the League of Communists of Slovenia
- Founded: 18 April 1937
- Dissolved: 4 February 1990
- Succeeded by: United List of Social Democrats (ZLSD)
- Headquarters: Ljubljana, SR Slovenia, Yugoslavia
- Ideology: Communism; Marxism–Leninism; Titoism
- Political position: Left-wing to far-left
- National affiliation: League of Communists of Yugoslavia
- Colours: Red

Party flag
- Politics of Slovenia; Political parties; Elections; Slovenian branch of the League of Communists of Yugoslavia

The League of Communists of Slovenia (Slovene: Zveza komunistov Slovenije, ZKS; Serbo-Croatian: Savez komunista Slovenije, SKS) was the Slovenian branch of the League of Communists of Yugoslavia, the sole legal party of Yugoslavia from 1945 to 1990. It was established in April 1937 as the Communist Party of Slovenia (Slovene: Komunistična partija Slovenije, KPJ; Serbo-Croatian: Komunistička partija Slovenije, KPJ) and was the first autonomous sub-national branch of the federal party. Its initial autonomy was further amplified with the Yugoslav constitution of 1974, which devolved greater power to the various republic level branches.

== History ==
The Slovene Socialist Party was founded in 1919 and merged with the Communist Party of Yugoslavia the following year. In 1937, a separate Slovenian communist party was established at a congress in Čebine.

In 1989, Slovenia passed amendments to its constitution that asserted its sovereignty over the federation, its right to secede and set foundations to a multi-party system. These amendments were bitterly opposed by the leadership of Yugoslavia under Slobodan Milošević. On 23 January 1990, the Slovene delegation, headed by Milan Kučan, left the Party Congress of the League of Communists of Yugoslavia, leading to the collapse of the all-Yugoslav party.

On 4 February 1990, the League of Communists of Slovenia changed its name to the League of Communists of Slovenia – Party of Democratic Renewal (Slovene: Zveza komunistov Slovenije – Stranka demokratične prenove, ZKS-SDP); shortly afterwards, it began negotiations with the Democratic Opposition of Slovenia for the establishment of a multi-party system. In April 1990, the reformed Communists lost the elections to the DEMOS coalition.

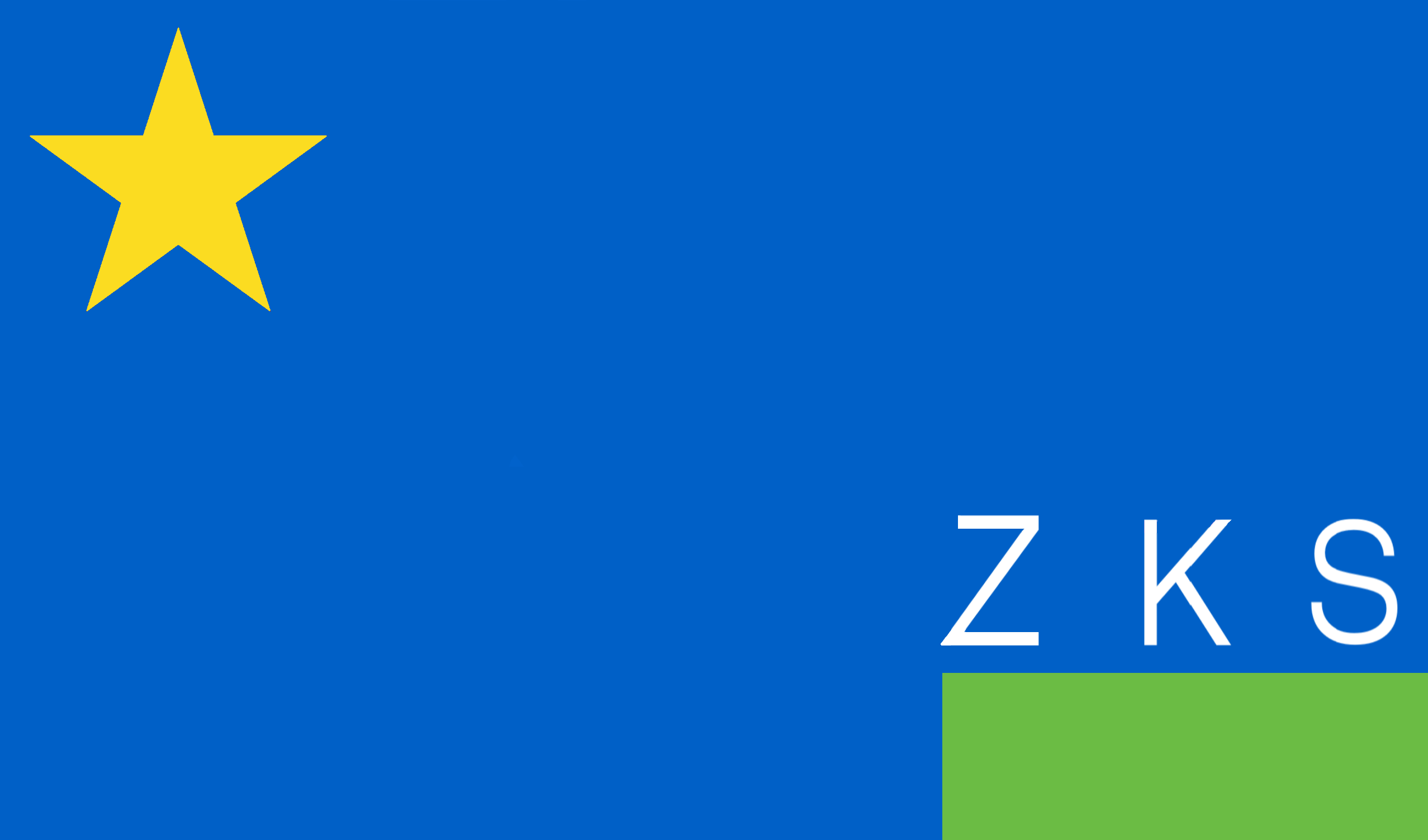
Flag of the Party in 1990

The party discarded the ZKS part of its name around 1992, even though it had ceased to be a Marxist-Leninist/Titoist party long before then. It eventually evolved into the Social Democrats, which is still one of the major parties in independent Slovenia.

== Party leaders ==
- Franc Leskošek (1937–1945) (1897–1983)
- Boris Kidrič (1945–1946) (1912–1953)
- Miha Marinko (1946–1966) (1900–1983)
- Albert Jakopič (October 1966– December 1968) (1914–1996)
- Franc Popit (December 1968 – April 1982) (1921–2013)
- Andrej Marinc (April 1982 – May 1986) (1930–2025)
- Milan Kučan (May 1986 – December 1989) (born 1941)
- Ciril Ribičič (December 1989 – May 1990) (born 1947)

Other influential leaders

- Edvard Kardelj (1910–1979)
- Tone Tomšič (1910–1942)
- Vida Tomšič (1913–1998)
- Boris Kraigher (1914–1967)
- Lidija Šentjurc (1911–2000)
- Ivan Maček (1908–1993)
- Sergej Kraigher (1914–2001)
- Boris Ziherl (1910–1976)
- Stane Dolanc (1925–1999)
- Mitja Ribičič (1919–2013)
- Prežihov Voranc (1893–1950)
- Dragotin Gustinčič (1882–1974)
- Stane Kavčič (1919–1987)
- Viktor Avbelj (1914–1993)
- Vladimir Krivic (1914–1996)
- Ivan Regent (1884–1967)
- Jože Potrč (1903–1963)
- Aleš Bebler (1907–1981)
- Joža Vilfan (1908–1987)
- Mirko Košir (1905–1951)
- Angela Vode (1892–1985)
- Dušan Kermavner (1903–1975)
- France Klopčič (1903–1986)
- Dušan Pirjevec (1921–1977)
- Franc Šetinc (1929–2016)
- Janez Vipotnik (1917–1998)
- Vinko Hafner (1920–2015)
- Jože Smole (1927–1996)

== Electoral results ==
=== Presidential ===
Election	Candidate	1st round		2nd round		Result
Election	Candidate	Votes	%	Votes	%	Result
1990	Milan Kučan	538,278	44.43	657,196	58.59	Won
1992	Milan Kučan	795,012	63.93			Won

=== National Assembly ===
Election	Leader	Votes	%	Seats	+/–	Government
1990	Ciril Ribičič	186,928	17.3 (#1)	14 / 80	▲14	Opposition
1992	Ciril Ribičič	161,349	13.6 (#3)	14 / 90	Steady	Coalition

== See also ==
- History of Slovenia
- Timeline of Slovenian history
- League of Communists of Yugoslavia
  - League of Communists of Bosnia and Herzegovina
  - League of Communists of Croatia
  - League of Communists of Macedonia
  - League of Communists of Montenegro
  - League of Communists of Serbia
    - League of Communists of Vojvodina
    - League of Communists of Kosovo
- List of leaders of communist Yugoslavia
- Socialist Federal Republic of Yugoslavia

== Sources ==
- Batič, Matic (2024). "Between Communism and Nationalism: Slovene Communist Spatial Politics in the North Adriatic Region, 1943–54". Journal of Contemporary History. 59 (4): 599–620. doi:10.1177/00220094241271045.
