= League of Communists of Serbia =

Political party in Serbia

League of Communists of Serbia Савез комуниста Србије Savez komunista Srbije
- Abbreviation: KPS (until 1952); SKS (after 1952)
- Secretary/President: See list
- Founded: 8 May 1945
- Dissolved: 17 July 1990
- Preceded by: Provincial Committee for Serbia
- Succeeded by: Socialist Party of Serbia
- Headquarters: Ušće Tower, Belgrade
- Youth wing: League of Socialist Youth of Serbia
- Ideology: Communism; Marxism–Leninism; Titoism
- National affiliation: League of Communists of Yugoslavia (Note: Known as the Communist Party of Yugoslavia until 1952.)
- Colours: Red

Party flag

The League of Communists of Serbia (Serbian: Савез комуниста Србије, romanised: Savez komunista Srbije, abbr. SKS), known as the Communist Party of Serbia (Serbian: Комунистичка партија Србије, romanised: Komunistička partija Srbije, abbr. KPS) until 1952, was the ruling political party of Serbia from 1945 to 1990. It was the Serbian branch of the League of Communists of Yugoslavia, known until 1952 as the Communist Party of Yugoslavia. The two autonomous provinces within Serbia had their own branches of the federal party: the League of Communists of Kosovo and the League of Communists of Vojvodina.

== History ==
Poster of the Second Congress of the Communist Party of Serbia, 1948

The republic-level branches of Kosovo and Vojvodina were associated with the League of Communists of Serbia as its "integral parts". Under the 1974 Yugoslav Constitution, greater power was devolved to these republic-level branches. Following the 8th Session of the Central Committee of the League of Communists of Serbia in 1987, the party was taken over by the populist faction led by Slobodan Milošević. Milošević appeased nationalists in Serbia by promising to reduce the level of autonomy within the autonomous provinces of Kosovo and Vojvodina. This policy increased ethnic tensions with the other republics and nationalities and led to the Yugoslav Wars. During the early 1990s, the growing ethnic tensions between the republics of Yugoslavia led to the break-up of the federal party.

On 17 July 1990, it merged with several smaller parties to form the Socialist Party of Serbia.

== Party leaders ==
1. Blagoje Nešković (1941 – 1948)
2. Petar Stambolić (1948 – March 1957)
3. Jovan Veselinov (March 1957 – 4 November 1966)
4. Dobrivoje Radosavljević (4 November 1966 – February 1968)
5. Petar Stambolić (February 1968 – November 1968)
6. Marko Nikezić (November 1968 – 26 October 1972)
7. Tihomir Vlaškalić (26 October 1972 – May 1982)
8. Dušan Čkrebić (May 1982 – 17 May 1984)
9. Ivan Stambolić (17 May 1984 – May 1986)
10. Slobodan Milošević (May 1986 – 24 May 1989)
11. Bogdan Trifunović (24 May 1989 – 16 July 1990)

== Congresses ==
Flag of Serbia within Yugoslavia

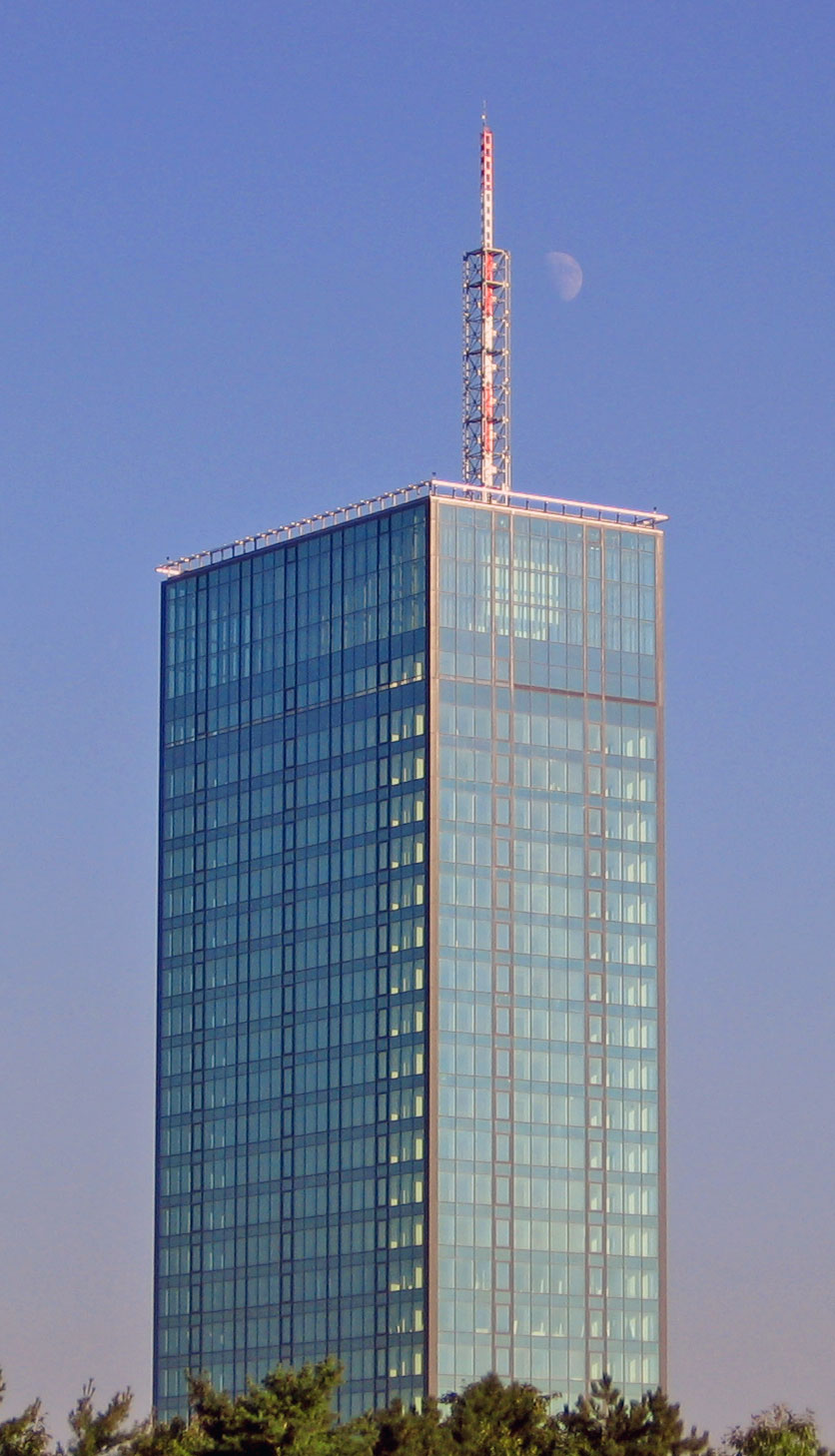
Ušće Tower, former headquarters of the League of Communists of Serbia in Belgrade

- I. (Founding) Congress – 8–12 May 1945
- II. Congress – 17–21 January 1949
- III. Congress – 26–29 April 1954
- IV. Congress – 4–6 June 1959
- V. Congress – 11–14 May 1965
- VI. Congress – 21–23 November 1968
- VII. Congress – 23–25 April 1974
- VIII. Congress – 29–31 May 1978
- IX. Congress – 1982
- X. Congress – 29–31 May 1986
- XI. Congress – December 1989
- XII. (Extraordinary) Congress – July 1990

== See also ==
- History of Serbia
- League of Communists of Yugoslavia
  - League of Communists of Bosnia and Herzegovina
  - League of Communists of Croatia
  - League of Communists of Macedonia
  - League of Communists of Montenegro
  - League of Communists of Slovenia
  - League of Communists of Vojvodina
  - League of Communists of Kosovo
- List of leaders of communist Yugoslavia
- Socialist Federal Republic of Yugoslavia
