= 14th Congress of the League of Communists of Yugoslavia =

Political event in Yugoslavia

- Logo of 14th extraordinary Congress of the League of Communists of Yugoslavia in 1990

Overview
- Type: Highest forum
- Convenor: 15th Session of the Central Committee of the 13th Congress
- Presiding organ: Working Presidency
- Electoral organ: Commission for the Verification of the Election
- Elected bodies: Central Committee; Statutory Commission; Supervisory Commission

Meeting place
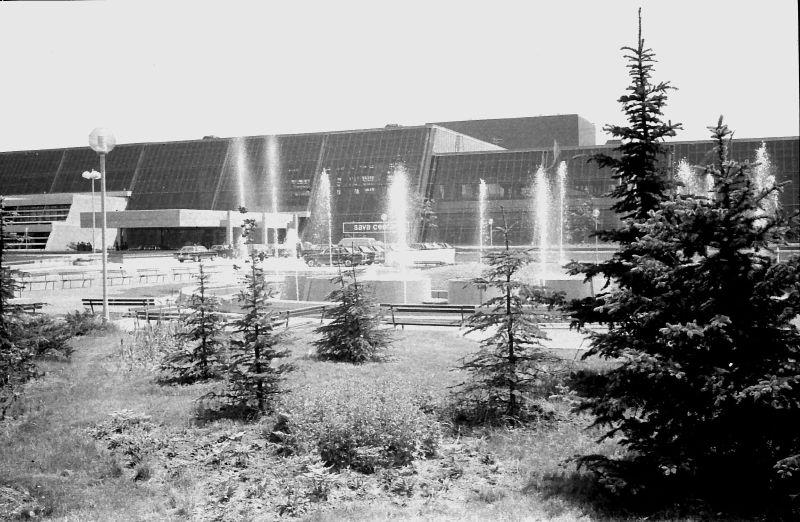
- Sava Centar, Beograd; SR Serbia, SFR Yugoslavia

The League of Communists of Yugoslavia (LCY) convened the highest forum for its 14th Extraordinary Congress on 20–23 January 1990 before it adjourned. It later reconvened for one day on 26 May. This was the last convened LCY Congress and was composed of 1,655 delegates. The congress was chaired by the Macedonian Milan Pančevski, the president of the Presidency of the Central Committee, on 20–23 January and by the Serb Petar Škundrić when it reconvened on 26 May 1990. It reconvened without the delegates from Croatia, Macedonia and Slovenia and verified a new provisional leadership, the Committee for the Preparation of the Democratic and Programmatic Renewal of the League of Communists of Yugoslavia, tasked it with convening the 15th LCY Congress on or before 29 September 1990.

== Background ==
Beginning in the 1970s, Yugoslavia began to experience a severe economic crisis. The federal state leadership, alongside the LCY Central Committee and its Presidency, failed to formulate a set of policies to get the state out of the crisis. This combined with increasing ethnic unrest, chiefly amongst Kosovo Albanians in the Socialist Autonomous Province of Kosovo in the Socialist Republic of Serbia, and the crisis European communism was experiencing, formed the chief backdrop to the 14th Extraordinary Congress. Due to the increasing incapacity of federal state and central party authorities, the republican branches of the LCY began to formulate independent proposals to solve the crisis. The League of Communists of Serbia (SKS), headed by Slobodan Milošević as the president of the Presidency of the SKS Central Committee, reaffirmed their belief in the communist form of government by calling for centralising reforms that strengthened democratic centralism by amassing more powers in the central party organs. The League of Communists of Slovenia (ZKS), headed by Milan Kučan as the president of the Presidency of the ZKS Central Committee, began moving in the opposite direction, seeking to institute liberal democracy by paving the way for multi-party elections and replacing democratic centralism with a confederalised party structure based on "democratic unity". Both sides harnessed nationalism in their respective republics to mobilise their supporters.

Slovene nationalists began to call for Slovene independence increasingly, and in January 1987, they gained national attention with the publication of the "Contributions to the Slovene National Programme", a special issue of the oppositionist newspaper Nova revija. The paper was anti-communist and called for the abolition of the ZKS' monopoly on state power in favour of liberal democracy. The Presidency of the ZKS Central Committee at first declared the programme to be "anti-Yugoslav, undemocratic and contrary to self-management." However, the Socialist Alliance of Working People of Slovenia, headed by Jože Smole, reacted more hesitantly and did not call for sanctions against the authors. Considering the deteriorating political situation in the Socialist Republic of Slovenia, the Yugoslav People's Army (YPA) formulated a plan in May 1988 to arrest over 200 purportedly anti-Yugoslav and anti-communist Slovenian intellectuals. The YPA then initiated a trial against the dissidents Janez Janša, Ivan Borštner, David Tasić and Franci Zavrl, known as the JBTZ trial, that mobilised even more Slovenes for national independence. Seeing where the wind was blowing, the ZKS Central Committee decided on 17 January 1989 to back liberal democracy and abolish its monopoly on state power. The ZKS Central Committee argued that political pluralism would safeguard socialism since it would produce a more open political system that was in accordance with international norms and modern civilisational values. The disagreement between the SKS and the ZKS came out into the open at the 21st Session of the Central Committee of the 13th LCY Congress, held on 17 February 1989, where Kučan openly advocated liberal democracy, stating, "Yugoslavia will become a democrat society or it will no longer exist. There can be no democracy without political pluralism."

== Congressional Preparations ==
The regular congress of the LCY should have been held in 1990, although the extraordinary congress was suggested earlier at the 18th session of the League of Communists of Yugoslavia when this proposal was rejected. Then, at the 20th session, the delegation of Vojvodina again proposed the holding of an extraordinary congress, which was again rejected, while the same proposal at the 22nd session was not accepted. Calling this congress 'extraordinary' (which (iz)vanredni literally translates to, in a sense of emergency) was especially opposed by the Slovenian delegation. On the issues to be addressed, especially those concerning the future organization of Yugoslavia, the congress was indeed remarkable.

=== Preliminary conferences and congresses of the constitutive branches ===
Per party rules, a constitutive branch of the LCY had the right to convene an extraordinary congress. The League of Communists of Vojvodina (SKV) did this at their 19th Provincial Conference, held on 19–21 January 1989. Not surprisingly, the SKV called for a unified LCY based on democratic centralism and the maintenance of the communist system. To prepare for the congress, the remaining LCY constitutive branches also convened their highest forums to elect delegates to the 14th Congress and members to the LCY Central Committee, LCY Supervisory Commission and LCY Commission on Statutory Questions as well as discussing policies to be taken up at the upcoming congress. On the day the SKV's provincial conference ended, the League of Communists of Kosovo (SKK) convened its 15th Provincial Conference, and called for upholding democratic centralism, opposition to confederalism and removing any threats to the LCY and the federal state. The 10th Extraordinary Congress of the League of Communists of Montenegro (SKCG), held on 26–28 April 1989, supported the policies of the SKS. It supported pluralism within the permits established by the communist state system.

These pro-SKS congresses and conferences were followed by the 9th Conference of the League of Communists in the Yugoslav People's Army (OSK JNA), held on 23–24 November 1989, which advocated for a unified LCY and Yugoslavia based on socialist principles. It voted to uphold democratic centralism and the LCY as a uniform organisation and opposed those calling for the de-ideologisation and de-politicisation of the Yugoslav People's Army (JNA), arguing that it was the army of socialism. One day later, the League of Communists of Macedonia (SKM) convened its 10th Congress, held on 25–27 November 1989, and called for upholding a federal Yugoslavia. The SKM retained a neutral stance on the issue of a multi-party system. The League of Communists of Bosnia and Herzegovina (SKBiH), at their 10th Congress convened on 7–9 December 1989, tried like the SKM to take a centrist position, but reaffirmed democratic centralism, opposed the confederalisation of the LCY and the de-politicisation of the JNA. However, the SKBiH did not make clear its opposition to a multi-party system, instead leaving that issue to the 14th Congress.

The 11th Congress of the League of Communists of Croatia (SKH), held from 11 to 13 December 1989, was evenly divided between reformists and traditional communists. It also tried to formulate a compromise that would work for both the ZKS and the SKS. It voted to approve the Presidency of the SKH Central Committee's proposal for instituting liberal democratic elections in Croatia. It opposed the SKS call for instituting a voting system based on one member, one vote. It also supported replacing democratic centralism with democratic unity, a new concept that was loosely defined. However, despite these decisions, traditional communists managed to stop any amendments to the SKH's statute, and the 11th Congress ended up reaffirming democratic centralism, the exclusion of religious members into the party and maintained atheism. In contrast, the 11th Congress of the SKS, held on 15–17 December 1989, while supporting political reforms within the traditional boundaries of the communist system, opposed any liberal democratic reforms. It reaffirmed its commitment to a federal Yugoslavia, stating, "no republic can have the right to be in the federation to the extent that it suits it". It called for upholding democratic centralism and instituting a voting system based on one member, one vote.

The ZKS held its 11th Congress on 22–23 December 1989. It adopted a platform entitled "Democratic Reform Today" that called for reforms that guaranteed human rights throughout Yugoslavia, liberal democratic multi-party elections, the establishment of a "Yugoslav Democratic Forum" in which all political parties could participate, the abolishment of the LCY's monopoly on state power, the elimination of social property, the establishment of liberal democratic parliaments with two internal chambers, local self-government for republics and autonomous provinces, the restoration of constitutional order in SAP Kosovo, the abolition of the criminal offence of counter-revolutionary crimes in the Yugoslav Criminal Code, and transforming the LCY's political program of communism and renouncing the organisational principle of democratic centralism and the system of one member, one vote.

Despite the policy differences of the LCY constitutive branches, opinion polls conducted amongst the LCY membership saw a clear dividing line that was not necessarily apparent from congress and conference resolutions. For example, 70,1 per cent of LCY members supported retaining democratic centralism, but 73 per cent of SKZ members opposed it. In the other branches, the numbers were as follows: 81 per cent in favour amongst SKS members, 78 per cent in the SKCG, 77 per cent in the SKV, 76 per cent in the SKBiH, 68 per cent in the SKM, 66 per cent in the SKK and 64 per cent in the SKH. Despite this, 45 per cent of SKH members supported ZKS' proposals of political and economic reforms and, in contrast, only 4-6 per cent supported the proposals emanating from the SKS, despite 25 per cent of SKH members being of Serbian ethnicity. A system based on one member, one vote was supported by members in the SKS (73%), SKCG (66%), SKV (65%), SKM (57%) and SKBiH (52%). In the SKH and SKK, a small majority opted for consensual decision-making. As such, it was becoming increasingly apparent that the LCY was not only splitting up along republican and provincial lines, but from within in some of the constitute branches of the LCY.

=== "A New Project for Democratic Socialism and Yugoslavia" ===
The proposed congressional declaration was entitled "A New Project for Democratic Socialism and Yugoslavia". Despite its title, the declaration was vague.

== Delegates ==
In total, the 14th Congress had 1,655 delegates. Of these, 1,457 were elected as delegates and 198 represented the LCY's central party organs. The first session was attended by 1,601 delegates, the second by 1,612 delegates and the third by 1,096 delegates.

Delegates of the 14th Congress
Branch	Jan.	May	Ref.
Bosnia-Herzegovina	248	205	
Central party organs	198	107	
Croatia	216	22	
Federal state organs	7	5	
Kosovo	94	75	
Macedonia	141	18	
Montenegro	99	103	
Serbia	333	339	
Slovenia	114	0	
Vojvodina	137	143	
Yugoslav People's Army	68	79	

== Proceedings ==
=== 1st–2nd Session (20–23 January) ===
At the congress, there were two congressional blocs, one led by SKS, that opposed political reforms that abolished the LCY's monopoly of power, and a reformist current by the ZKS that sought to institute liberal democracy. The SKS proposed reforms under the banner "socialist democratisation". However, the system of delegate elections was based on proportionate representation, meaning that the largest constitutive branches had more representatives. However, both sides believed some reforms were necessary. That meant that the ZKS and those opposing reforms had a majority. The voting system was also ingrained with much symbolism, with delegates voting for congressional delegates having to use a red paper while those opposing had to use a green one.

During the Congress, any illusions about a united LCY front that could bring the country out of crisis were dispelled. Instead, the Congress was dominated mostly by clashes between the Serbian and Slovenian delegations over the power and decision-making process of the constituent republics of Yugoslavia. The Serbian delegation advocated introducing a "one man – one vote" policy with a more centralized Yugoslavia. The Slovenes, however, suggested a confederation party and state, giving more power to the republics.

The congress rejected all the ZKS proposals. Only one ZKS proposal, introduced by Marko Bulc, received more than one-third of the votes. That proposal concerned lifting the blockade Serbia had installed against Slovenia in 1989. In retrospect, Kučan is to have said that this rejection had boosted the separatist tendency of the ZKS since it was a feeling that Yugoslavia as a whole had let them down since none of the other constitutive branches came to their defence. When discussing the amendment of the LCY's statute, the ZKS proposed turning the LCY into a confederal like-party where the LCY could not override the constitutive branches, and 1,165 delegates voted against it, and 169 supported it. Generally, only the reformist wing of the League of Communists of Croatia supported them.

After two days of sharp verbal conflict, the Slovene delegation walked out of the Sava Center on 22 January. The next day, the Slovene delegation would argue that the policy programme that was winning at the congress was wrongheaded; "the unitarism of the [LCY] under conditions of political pluralism was suicidal stupidity". Immediately after the Slovene delegation left, Milošević as the informal head of the ZKS delegation, suggested that 14th Congress continue to work and move on to decision-making. However, the Croatian delegation opposed this motion, arguing it was unconstitutional. At the prompting of Slobodan Lang, Ivica Račan, head of the Croatian delegation, informed the congress that "we cannot accept a Yugoslav party without the Slovenes". When Milošević asked what it would take to recommence the meeting, the Croatian delegation remarked, "the Slovene delegation", and that if the meeting was recommenced, they too would leave the proceedings. They also argued that they could not accept "market competition without the competition of political ideas".

The Macedonian and Bosnian delegations were left bewildered, having stood a middle-ground, having opposed a Serbian-dominated party like the Slovenes, but supported reforms that strengthened the LCY. In the heat of the moment Nijaz Duraković, the president of the Central Committee of the League of Communists of Bosnia and Herzegovina, went to the podium and, according to scholar Ensar Muharemović, "gave a speech in which he publicly called out those who criticized the LCY and showed them the door." However, in retrospect, Duraković counter-argued that his speech was misinterpreted and that he actually criticised those within the Bosnian delegation that were calling to split the LCY into two parties; one social democratic and another communist thus violating the SK BIH's political position adopted at its 10th Congress in 1989. His speech was greeted by applause by the Serbian and Montenegrin delegations, and the Serbian media, which had previously villainised him, began to praise him. However, at midnight, at an internal meeting of the Bosnian delegation, it discussed whether it should stay or leave. It eventually decided to leave after Duraković argued in favour of remaining neutral in the conflict between the reformists and the traditionalists. He also made the case that leaving the congress would not mean the LCY's demise. At 22.45, Milan Pančevski, the president of the Working Presidency of the 14th Congress, called the day's proceedings to a close and an adjournment for the following day; however, this did not happen, and the congress was recalled on 26 May.

=== Adjournment ===
On 17 May, Pančevski's term as president of the LCY Presidency ran out, and the LCY Presidency replaced him on 23 May 1990 with Miomir Grbović as "Coordinator of the Work of the LCY Presidency". The Central Committee of the League of Communists of Macedonia (SKM) had previously asked him to step down in order "to respect the stands of the League of Communists of Macedonia", but he refused to acquiescence to their demands. The following day, on 24 May, the leagues of communists of Croatia and Slovenia announced that they would not attend the 14th Congress' reconvocation. The Slovenian league reasoned that it could not attend due to the "violence against those who think differently", the use of majority votes, and the belittling of oppositional views at the first and second plenary sessions of the 14th Congress in January. However, the Slovenes positively greeted the fact that the LCY branches had transformed themselves into independent political parties and were positively disposed of a Yugoslav alliance of left-wing forces but not a federal party. The Croatian league, for that matter, informed the reconstituted congress that it believed that the LCY had ceased to exist and that the old conception of socialism was no longer viable. The next day, on 25 May, the SKM Central Committee informed the LCY Presidency that it could not attend the congress, arguing that the previously unacceptable policies that had been discussed in January would be forced upon the congress participants. It opposed the idea of electing a new LCY Presidency, calling instead for establishing a coordination committee of the constitutive branches, and the establishment of a uniform party. However, the SKM was positively disposed to reconvening a new congress later to transform the LCY. The remainder of the LCY Central Committee, attended by the leagues of Serbia, Montenegro, Vojvodina, Kosovo, Bosnia and Herzegovina and the Yugoslav People's Army, reconvened for its 31st Working and Consultative Session on 25 May 1990, and endorsed without much discussion the proposed documents to be discussed at the reconvened 14th Congress.

=== 3rd Session (26 May) ===
The 14th Congress reconvened on 26 May. It was attended by delegates of LCY branches in Serbia, Montenegro, Kosovo, Vojvodina, the army, and Bosnia and Herzegovina, as well as by individual delegates from Croatia and Macedonia. None attended from the Slovenian branch. Grbović led the opening proceedings until the election of the presiding organ, the Working Presidency. The presidency was mostly composed of the presidents of the remaining LCY branches: Momir Bulatović, Nijaz Duraković, Rahman Morina, Nedeljko Šipovac, Bogdan Trifunović, Simeon Bunčić, as well as Petar Škundrić and Miomir Grbović. Škundrić was elected president of the Working Presidency, and led congress proceedings. The congress concluded by electing a provisional leadership, the Committee for the Preparation of the Democratic and Programmatic Renewal of the LCY Central Committee. The renewal committee failed to provide cohesive leadership. Yugoslavia faced an uncertain period after the Congress, without any significant, cohesive force or individual that could lead the state out of its crisis. Soon after, the LCY became defunct after 71 years of existence, ending 45 years of uninterrupted rule and paving the way for free elections. This event was one of the key moments for the beginning of the breakup of Yugoslavia.
