= Leadership of the League of Communists Organisation in the Yugoslav People's Army =

Leader of the League of Communists Organisation in the Yugoslav People's Army

The leadership, consisting of the president and the secretary of the Presidency, led the work of the Committee of the League of Communists Organisation in the Yugoslav People's Army (LCY–YPA), the party organisation of the Central Committee of the League of Communists of Yugoslavia (LCY) in the military. The president served ex officio as a member of the LCY Presidency and of the LCY Central Committee. To be eligible to serve, the president had to be a member of the LCY–YPA Presidency.

== Officeholders ==
=== Presidents ===
Presidents of the Presidency of the Committee of the League of Communists Organisation in the Yugoslav People's Army
No.	Name	Took office	Left office	Tenure	Term of office	Birth	PM	Death	Nation	Ref.
1	Branko Borojević	1 March 1969	15 January 1971	1 year, 320 days	1st–2nd (1969–1971)	1919	1941	1982	Croat	
2	Džemil Šarac	15 January 1971	26 December 1978	7 years, 345 days	3rd–5th (1971–1978)	1921	1941	2002	Muslim	
3	Dane Ćuić	26 December 1978	28 May 1984	5 years, 154 days	6th–7th (1978–1986)	1923	1942	1988	Serb	
4	Georgije Jovičić	28 May 1984	22 April 1988	3 years, 330 days	7th–8th (1982–1989)	1927	1942	2011	Montenegrin	
5	Petar Šimić	22 April 1988	11 April 1990	1 year, 354 days	8th–9th (1986–1990)	1932	1948	1990	Croat	
6	Božidar Grubišić	25 May 1990	17 December 1990	206 days	9th (1989–1990)	1932	1951	2021	Croat	

=== Secretaries ===
Secretaries of the Presidency of the Committee of the League of Communists in the Yugoslav People's Army
No.	Name	Took office	Left office	Tenure	Term of office	Birth	PM	Death	Nation	Ref.
1	Milan Krdžić	February 1975	26 December 1978	3 years, 328 days	4th–5th (1975–1978)	1922	1941	?	Serb	
2	Georgije Jovičić	26 December 1978	26 April 1982	3 years, 121 days	6th–7th (1978–1986)	1927	1942	2011	Montenegrin	
3	Slavko Maričević	26 April 1982	28 May 1984	2 years, 32 days	7th (1982–1986)	1926	1942	2015	Montenegrin	
4	Simeon Bunčić	28 May 1984	22 April 1988	3 years, 330 days	7th–8th (1982–1989)	1928	1943	?	Serb	
5	Nebojša Tica	22 April 1988	17 December 1990	2 years, 239 days	8th–9th (1986–1990)	1934	1954	2020	Serb	

== Bibliography ==
- Hronologija radničkog pokreta i SKJ 1919–1979: tom — I — 1919–1941 [Chronology of the labor movement and SKJ 1919–1979: Volume — I — 1919–1941] (in Serbo-Croatian). Beograd: Narodna knjiga; Institut za savremenu istoriju. 1980. COBISS 1539739342
- Hronologija radničkog pokreta i SKJ 1919–1979: tom — II — 1941–1945 [Chronology of the labor movement and SKJ 1919–1979: Volume — II — 1941–1945] (in Serbo-Croatian). Beograd: Narodna knjiga; Institut za savremenu istoriju. 1980. COBISS 49272583
- Hronologija radničkog pokreta i SKJ 1919–1979. tom — III — 1945–1979 [Chronology of the labor movement and SKJ 1919–1979: Volume — III — 1945–1979] (in Serbo-Croatian). Beograd: Narodna knjiga; Institut za savremenu istoriju. 1980. COBISS 1539739598
- Lewytzkyj, Borys; Stroynowski, Juliusz, eds. (1978). Who's Who in the Socialist Countries. K. G. Saur Verlag. ISBN 3-7940-3017-6.
- Marković, Dragan; Kržavac, Savo (1985). Zašto su smenjivani [Why Were They Replaced?] (in Serbo-Croatian). Partizanska knj.
- Martinović, Savo (1970). Deveti kongres Saveza komunista Jugoslavije, Beograd, 11-13. III.1969 [Ninth Congress of the League of Communists of Yugoslavia, Belgrade, 11–13. III 1969] (in Serbo-Croatian). Komunist.
- Pirjevec, Jože (2018). Tito and His Comrades. University of Wisconsin Press. ISBN 9780299317706.
- Staff writer, ed. (1953). VI kongres Komunističke partije Jugoslavije: 2-7 novembra 1952: stenografske beleške [VI Congress of the Communist Party of Yugoslavia] (in Serbo-Croatian). Kultura.
- Staff writer (1988). Daily Report: East Europe. Vol. 74–83. Foreign Broadcast Information Service.
- Stanković, Slobodan (1981). Staar, Richard F. (ed.). The End of the Tito Era: Yugoslavia's Dilemmas. Hoover International Studies. Hoover Institution Press. ISBN 9780817973629.
- Stroynowski, Juliusz, ed. (1989a). Who's Who in the Socialist Countries of Europe: A–H. K. G. Saur Verlag. ISBN 3-598-10719-6.
- Stroynowski, Juliusz, ed. (1989b). Who's Who in the Socialist Countries of Europe: I–O. K. G. Saur Verlag. ISBN 3-598-10719-6.
- Stroynowski, Juliusz, ed. (1989c). Who's Who in the Socialist Countries of Europe: P–Z. K. G. Saur Verlag. ISBN 3-598-10719-6.
- Tadić, Aleksandar (1968). Pali za lepša svitanja: Majke heroja pričaju [Lights For More Beautiful dawns: Mothers of Heroes Talk] (in Serbo-Croatian). Međunarodna štampa-Interpress.
- Zalar, Charles, ed. (1961). Yugoslav Communism: A Critical Study. United States Government Printing Office. Archived from the original on 11 June 2023.
