= Central Committee of the League of Communists of Yugoslavia =

Highest organ of the League of Communists of Yugoslavia between two congresses

Overview
- Type: Highest organ
- Elected by: Congress
- Length of term: Varied from 4 to 6 years
- Term limits: None

History
- Established: by 1st Congress on 23 April 1919; 106 years ago
- Disbanded: by 14th Congress on 26 May 1990; 35 years ago
- First convocation: 23 April 1919
- Last convocation: 23 May 1990

Leadership
- Leader office: President
- Executive organ: Presidency
- Administrative officer: Secretary of the Presidency

Meeting place
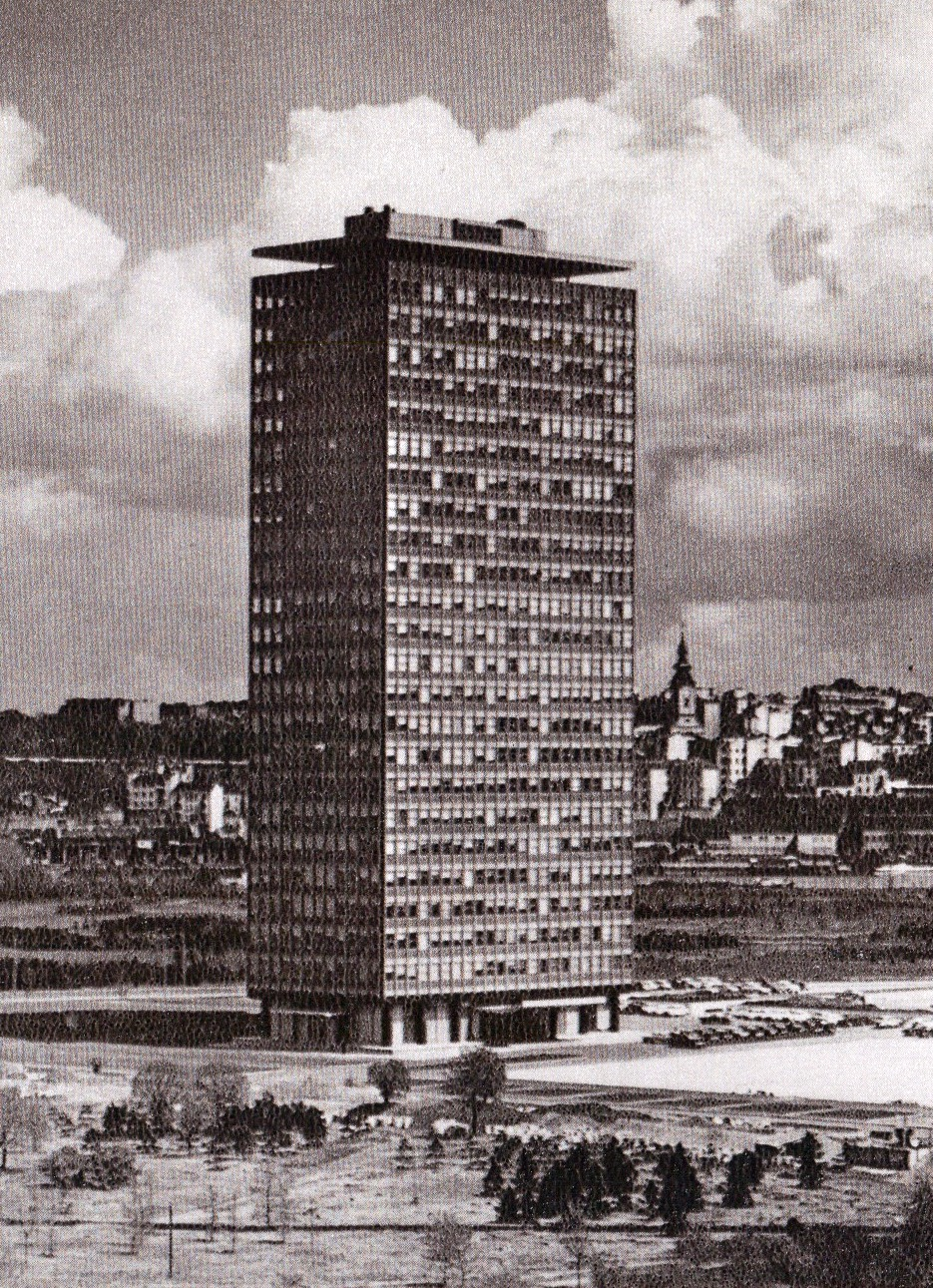
- Palace of Socio-Political Organisations

Statute
- "Statute of the League of Communists of Yugoslavia"

Regulation
- "Rules of Procedure on the Organisation and Activity of the Central Committee of the League of Communists of Yugoslavia"

The Central Committee was the highest organ of the League of Communists of Yugoslavia (LCY), the ruling party of the Socialist Federal Republic of Yugoslavia, between two congresses, which it was elected by and reported to. An exception to this rule occurred at the LCY 9th Congress in 1969 when the Central Committee was replaced with the Conference, which lasted until the reestablishemtn of the central committee at the 10th LCY Congress in 1974. The central committee oversaw the work of the LCY as a whole and ensured that the guidelines and assignments adopted by the LCY Congress were complied with. It could set policy and formulate a political platform within the parameters set by the last convened party congress. All central committee members were of equal standing, including the presidency members. Specifically, the LCY Central Committee had the right to elect and remove members of its political-executive organ, the LCY Presidency, which led the LCY when the central committee was not in session.

Until 1966, the LCY was a unitary organisation in which the central party leadership controlled cadre appointments and national policy alone through the central committee apparatus and primarily through its secretariat. This system was institutionally reformed after the purge of Josip Broz Tito's long-standing heir apparent Aleksandar Ranković and replaced with a system in which the LCY Central Committee became a more independent body. With its reestablishment in 1974, each republican LC branch had two representatives and one ex officio member, each autonomous province one representative and one ex officio member and the League of Communists Organisation in the Yugoslav People's Army had one ex officio member. In this system, Tito, the LCY leader from 1939 to his death on 4 May 1980, was the only member of the central committee who was not elected to represent a constitutive branch of the LCY, and was an ex officio member through holding the office of president of the LCY Central Committee. Upon his death, the LCY presidency was abolished and replaced by the office of president of the Presidency of the LCY Central Committee. The officeholders had the right to convene the LCY Central Committee for sessions.

The post-Tito system of collective leadership succeeded in spreading power, but it was widely argued that these reforms weakened the federal party organs at the expense of the organs of the LCY's branches. With the fall of communism in 1989 in most of Eastern Europe, as well as heightened conflict within the LCY on ethnic lines, the LCY split at its 14th Congress, held on 20–22 January 1990. The congress was adjourned and did not reconvene before May 1990; in the meantime, the LCs Macedonia, Slovenia and Croatia had left the LCY. On 26 May 1990, the 14th LCY Congress elected a Committee for the Preparation of the Democratic and Programmatic Renewal to function as a provisional leadership with the task of convening the 15th LCY Congress. The congress was never convened, and the committee itself―the last federal organ of the LCY―dissolved itself on 22 January 1991.

== History ==
=== A weak institution: 1948–1969 ===
The 5th Congress, held on 21–28 July 1948, amended the party statute. According to Ranković, the statute adopted "was by and large a copy of the Statute of the Soviet Communist Party". Like its Soviet counterpart, the Yugoslav party centralised most decision-making at the expense of lower-level organs. The 6th Congress, held on 2–7 November 1952, amended the statute. These amendments weakened the central committee. The statute of the 5th Congress had bestowed on the central committee the right to appoint and dismiss party organisers in special areas. This right was now deemed undemocratic and harmful to party development. Moreover, the position of "Candidate of the Central Committee", where the officeholder had "no right except an advisory vote", was abolished. If, by any chance, central committee vacancies were reduced to a third of those elected at the previous congress, an extraordinary congress was to be convened to elect members to fill the remaining spots. The 6th Congress also sought to democratise and make the party more transparent in its activities. For instance, the proceedings of the 3rd Extraordinary Session of the Central Committee of the 6th Congress, held on 16–17 January 1954, were publicly broadcast and made public in written form in Komunist, which was in contrast to the Soviet Central Committee which kept its activities mostly secret. These changes remained in force until the 8th LCY Congress, held on 7–13 December 1964.

The 8th LCY Congress sought to clarify in the statute the accountability of the LCY Executive Committee to the central committee. According to scholar April Carter, "Despite the stated intention of the new Statute to subordinate the Executive Committee to the wider body of the Central Committee, no real change appears to have occurred [...] although there was an indication, made in a brief aside at the Fifth [Session] in October 1966, that attempts had been made earlier to invigorate the Central Committee through reorganisation". Critiques of Ranković claimed that he had created a machine within the LCY Central Committee that was neither accountable to the sessions of the central committee nor its executive committee. Ranković defended himself, saying that he barred the other secretaries from discussing issues outside their scope of responsibilities. Others, such as the Montenegrin LCY Central Committee member Budislav Šoškić, criticised the 8th LCY Congress for passing a statute he described as "a half-way measure" which contained "a fair amount of compromise solutions".

The institutional framework established at the 8th Congress lasted until the 5th Session of the Central Committee of the 8th Congress on 4 October 1966. Earlier, at the 4th Session of the Central Committee of the 8th Congress on 1 July 1966, the LCY had purged Tito's presumed heir apparent Ranković, the Vice President of Yugoslavia and the head of the State Security Administration, for allegedly bugging Tito's bedroom. In a bid to reform the party structure, the fifth session established the Commission for the Reorganisation and Further Development of the LCY (CRFD–LCY), headed by Mijalko Todorović and composed of 40-members, to recommend party organisational reform. The main problem was perceived to be the central committee's failure in holding its executive organs to account. This was now blamed on Ranković, who had stifled debate both at the federal level but also within the Central Committee of the League of Communists of Serbia (LC Serbia), according to LCY and SKS Central Committee member Dragi Stamenković, "as soon as we get to the lobbies real discussion begins. We have often heard, or made jokes, about this. If the debates in the lobbies had taken place in the conference hall, every Central Committee meeting would have been lively and what a meeting of the Central Committee is supposed to be."

Rejecting calls to convene an extraordinary congress of the LCY, the fifth session abolished the secretariat and the executive committee and replaced them with a presidency and a new executive committee. The executive committee was to be held accountable to the presidency, while the presidency was given the right to convene central committee sessions, set the agenda for central committee sessions and review its work. Furthermore, stipulations were made to clarify that commissions of the LCY Central Committee worked independently and reported on their to the sessions of the central committee in a bid to weaken the executive committee's meddling in their affairs. Despite these changes, the executive committee still managed to relegate the central committee, as it did at the 9th Session of the LCY Central Committee on 16 July 1968. At the session, the executive committee proposed abolishing the central committee altogether and delegating its functions to a new institution, the "Conference of the League of Communists of Yugoslavia", and others to the LCY Presidency. The ninth session adopted the proposal. Apparently, the main reason for pressing these changes was the executive committee's perception that reorganising the central party bodies would make rejuvenating the LCY's leadership organs easier.

=== Preparing for Tito's death: 1974–1980 ===
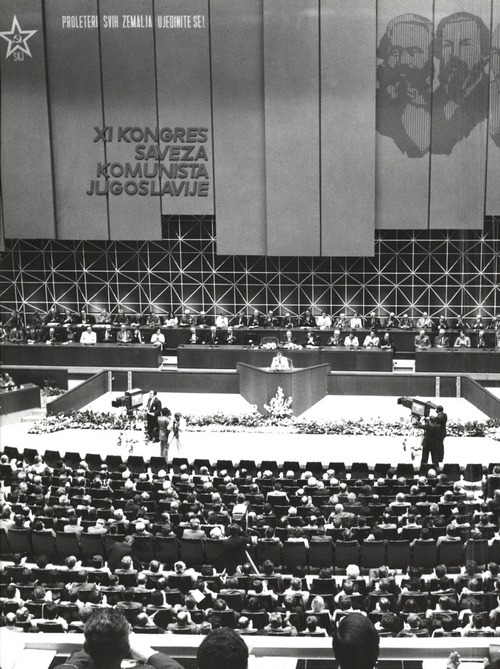
The 11th LCY Congress, held in 1978, was the last party congress attended by Tito.

The 10th Congress of the League of Communists of Yugoslavia, held on 27–30 May 1974, reestablished the LCY Central Committee and sought to recentralise power by emphasising democratic centralism. The presidency and executive were accountable to it. Tito argued in favour of reestablishing the central committee, telling the congress, "The League of Communists needs a strong, dynamic and influential leadership, or to be more precise, that kind of ideological-political centre—the central committee with its executive organs—which, with its organised and timely action, with its political positions and decisions, will secure unity of leadership and unity of action of the entire League of Communists, will steer its activities towards the solving of the vital issues of the socialist self-management development of the Yugoslav community." The statute adopted at the congress referred to the central committee as "the highest organ of the League of Communists of Yugoslavia between two congresses". Rules regarding membership was clarified on 20 March 1978 at the 6th Session of the Central Committee of the 10th Congress, which decided to institute a fixed formula of branch representation. Each republic was to be represented by 20 members in the LCY Central Committee, of which 19 were elected and one member, the president of the presidency of the republican branch in question, serving ex officio. The party branches in the autonomous provinces and in the army were represented by 15 members, of which 14 were elected, and one served ex officio. Combined, this would total 165 members. Additionally, the LCY Central Committee president also served as ex officio, bringing the membership to 166. From then on, the republican parties were equally represented in the LCY Central Committee. Dane Ćuić, the President of the Presidency of the Committee of the League of Communists Organisation in the Yugoslav People's Army (YPA), explained the system the following way, "The Leagues of Communists of the republics and provinces are equally represented in the LCY Central Committee and its Presidency, and on that basis it is impossible to have outvoting and the imposition of anyone's views".

Three months after the 11th Congress, held on 20–23 June 1978, the presidency convened and adopted on 19 October 1978 the "Rules of Procedure on the Organisation and Working Method of the Presidency" to institute and protect collective leadership. It established a new position, the Chairman of the Presidency of the LCY Central Committee, in which the officeholder was limited to a one-year term in office. Later, at the 2nd Session of the Central Committee of the 11th Congress on 19 December 1978, the presidency adopted the "Rules of Procedure on the Organisation and Working Method of the Central Committee" to institute and protect collective leadership. The rules of procedure were adopted unanimously and stated that the LCY Central Committee was the highest decision-making body of the LCY between the two congresses. Its responsibilities regarding the realisation of congressional decisions and political positions were clarified. It also made clear that all LCY Central Committee members were responsible for the work and decisions of the central committee and not any other body except the party congress. The intention of these reforms were to strengthen the party and prepare for the post-Tito years.

Tito died of natural causes on 4 May 1980. The 11th Session of the 11th Central Committee convened on 12 June 1980 and on the suggestion of Bosnian Croat Branko Mikulić, decided that the LCY Presidency and Central Committee "should work in accordance with their duties and with the authorisation provided for in the Standing Rules of the Party Statutes concerning their work and on the basis of the decisions to be made at today’s [12 June 1980] plenum." The eleventh session decided not to elect a person to serve as president of the LCY Central Committee and instead transformed the office of chairman of the Presidency of the LCY Central Committee into the office of president of the Presidency of the LCY Central Committee. It was decided that the LCY Central Committee would retain its role as the highest organ between two congresses but opted against turning it into a collective party presidency. Instead, a five-member Working Presidium of the LCY Central Committee, which was to be elected at each convocation of a session of the LCY Central Committee, would function as the collective party presidency. It was decided that the president and secretary of the LCY Presidency would be nominated by a special commission of the LCY Presidency while other presidency members were to be nominated and elected by a special commission of the LCY Central Committee.

=== A crisis of unity: 1980–1991 ===
Since Tito's death, central committee sessions were characterised by infighting, but this was never made public (despite certain rumours). However, beginning with the 14th Session of the Central Committee of the 12th Congress, held on 16 October 1984, when Serb member Dragoslav Marković proposed a series of political reforms that would replace consensus with majority decision-making the infighting was brought into the open. At the end of the session, he criticised Andrej Marinc, an ex officio member and the president of the Presidency of the Slovenian Central Committee, of rejecting reforms because they were "unconstitutional". Marinc argued that the reforms Marković outlined might strengthen the federal government and central party at the expense of the republics and autonomous provinces, and was, therefore, not wise. Fellow Slovene Central Committee member France Popit argued, on Marinc's behalf, that Yugoslavia faced "an economic, not a political crisis." On the other hand, Hamdija Pozderac, a Bosnian member of the LCY Presidency, pointed to the fact that decentralisation had immobilised the federal government and central party. At the 18th Session of the 12th Central Committee, held on 19 July 1985, Macedonian LCY Presidency member Dimče Belovski noted in his report, which was made public, that "The Central Committee has had to overcome various contradictions caused by the desire to achieve the unity of the League of Communists of Yugoslavia on the one hand and the practical independence of the republic and provincial Leagues of Communists on the other." He stated that the LCY had room for uncompromising criticism of its activity but that it did not need leaders who could not, for whatever reason, participate in formulating and implementing policies. Belovski concluded his report by stating, "We must abandon the practice whereby individual members of the Central Committee, as well as other political functionaries, make statements that go against adopted resolutions or views expressed by the leadership; this is what has been confusing party members."

The ensuing 19th Session of the Central Committee of the 12th Congress, held on 30 July 1985, adopted a resolution which, in practice, replaced articles 73 to 79 of the LCY statute. The resolution stated, "The LCY Central Committee will become more efficient through the consistent and responsible implementation of its own functions and through the overall work of all organisations and agencies of the League of Communists of Yugoslavia, above all the work of the republican and provincial committees." The resolution stated that the LCY Central Committee would, from then on, promptly discuss and react to political events and reconcile differing political positions. On behalf of the republican central committee, the provincial committees of autonomous provinces, the LCY Committee in the Yugoslav People's Army and all party organisations, the LCY Central Committee would initiate and direct all ideological and political activities. A major emphasis was placed on the fact that the LCY Central Committee had the right to guide the party's international worker movement policies and to initiate cooperation with foreign movements and parties. The LCY Presidency was required to implement the Central Committee's policies if these goals were to be reached. The resolution also amended, informally, the LCY statute section on democratic centralism. This change emphasised the "equal responsibility" of the branches to formulate and implement the LCY's unified policies. The committees of the republican and autonomous provincial committees were from the nineteenth session onwards to report regularly on the implementation of the resolutions of the LCY Central Committee. The resolution stressed that "All attempts to deny the principle of democratic centralism should be energetically resisted, regardless of whether centralistic, bureaucratic uniformity is in question or liberalistic ideas leading to the federalisation [of the LCY]; they objectively constitute an attack on the LCY as a united revolutionary organisation." The resolution gave the LCY Central Committee the right to expel people from the party who acted against party policy.

At the 13th Congress, held on 25–28 June 1986, the LCY admitted that there existed a "crisis of unity" and that it "challenged the very foundations of the communist revolution." The party statute was amended to strengthen the powers of the LCY Central Committee and its presidency. The Central Committee elected at the 13th Congress comprised 127 newcomers and 38 reelected individuals. Despite these changes, the lack of unity remained. In a bid to solve this crisis, the 11th Session of the 13th Central Committee, held on 7–8 December 1987, decided to convene the LCY Conference, which was heralded as an "emergency meeting" by the official press. The Serbian Branch demanded to convene an extraordinary congress if the 1st Conference failed to solve the acute problems facing the LCY. Despite adopting clear policies and the republican branches consenting to them at the conference, they were not implemented by the republican branches. Considering this failure, renewed calls were made for convening an extraordinary congress.

The 19th Provincial Conference of the Vojvodina branch, held on 19–21 January 1989, adopted a resolution which demanded a vote of confidence on Stipe Šuvar (which he survived), the president of the Presidency of the LCY Central Committee, and the convocation of an extraordinary congress. While controversial, the LCY statute stated that if one LCY branch called for an extraordinary congress, the LCY Central Committee had to convene it. The 13th Central Committee's 20th Session, held on 19 April 1989, formally approved the holding of an extraordinary congress: only twenty-four central committee members voted against the proposal. Of those voting against, twenty came from the Slovenian branch, three from the Croatian branch and one member from the Bosnian branch. Scholar Dejan Jović has interpreted this move by the Vojvodina branch as part of a plan initiated by Slobodan Milošević, the president of the Presidency of the Serbian Central Committee, "to take over the [LCY] and subsequently the state." Milošević's goal, according to Jović, was introducing a system of one member, one vote at the congress and putting an end to the system of decentralised republican control of the LCY. However, this was greeted by the Slovenian branch, led by Milan Kučan, as threatening the principle of national affirmation and autonomy. However, the 20th Session stopped some of Milošević's plans. According to the party statute, the initiator of an extraordinary congress had the right to draft the main congress documents and agenda, which in this instance would have meant giving the pro-Milošević Vojvodina branch chief responsibility for organising the congress. The twentieth session opted instead to adopt ordinary congress procedures, which made the LCY Central Committee the chief congress organiser.

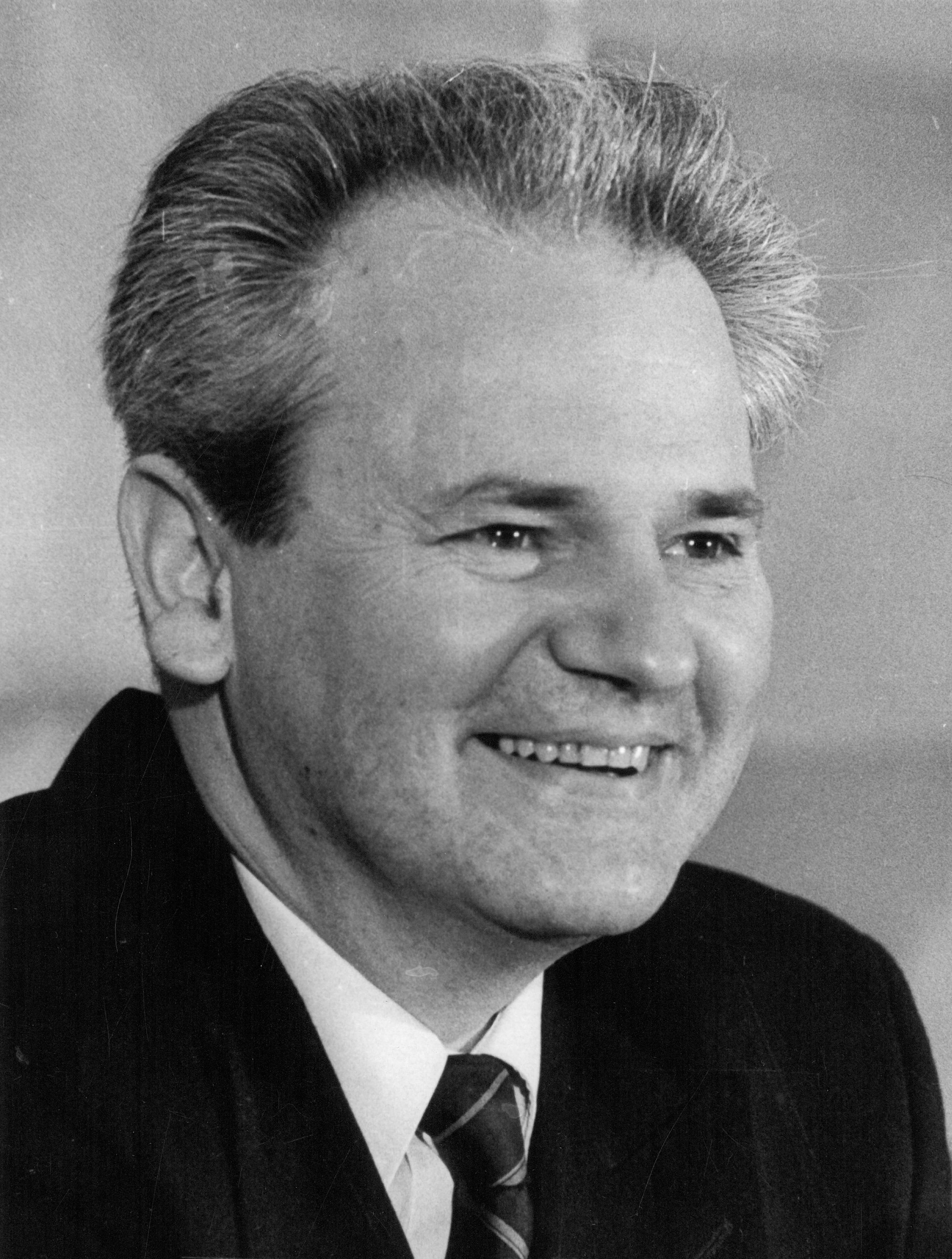
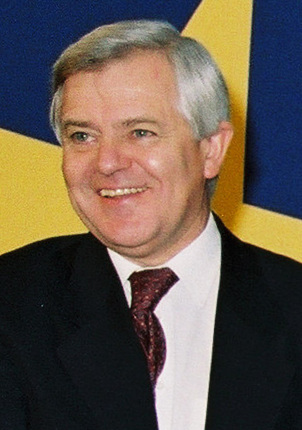
The period in between the 13th and 14th Congress saw a widening conflict between the Serbian branch, led by Slobodan Milošević, and the Slovenian branch, led by Milan Kučan. The Serbian branch sought to centralise power and maintain a non-liberal system, while the Slovenes campaigned for liberal democratic politics and a confederal party structure.

The Presidency of the Slovenian Central Committee reacted on 20 June by convening a session of its Central Committee do discuss whether to convene an extraordinary congress of its own if the Slovenian branch was outvoted at the upcoming LCY extraordinary congress. The Slovenian extraordinary congress was to "decide either for a unilateral cancellation of compliance with democratic centralism or for the complete organisational independence of the League of Communists of Slovenia." Earlier on 16 June, the National Assembly of Slovenia had adopted a statement which made clear Slovenia's "inalienable" right to secede from Yugoslavia. The 14th Congress convened on 20 January and produced a raft of policies. On 22 January, it adopted abolishing the LCY's monopoly of political power and creating a pluralist society. How to define pluralism was, however, controversial and Macedonian Milan Pančevski, the president of the LCY Presidency, argued, "The LCY finds unacceptable the thesis according to which the essence and form of political pluralism are reduced to a classic multiparty system alone" and that pluralism had to "be based on socialist orientation and the federal structure." Ciril Ribičič, the president of the Presidency of the Slovene Central Committee, countered Pančevski's argument, "[this is] the last chance for Yugoslav communists to mark a watershed on the way towards multiparty pluralism." The congress voted overwhelmingly against the Slovenian proposal to transform the LCY into a confederal party and its conception of pluralism. Upon losing several votes, the Slovenian delegation left the congress on 22 January, which was followed by the leaving of the Croat delegation. The Serbian delegation led by Milošević wanted to continue the congress, but it was decided on 23 January to adjourn the congress and resume it at a later date.

Shortly after the congress, on 4 February, a conference of the League of Communists of Slovenia adopted a resolution which stated, "for the Slovene LC the 14th extraordinary congress of the LCY has ended, and the LCY, in the form which it had up to the congress, has ceased to exist" and that the Slovenian branch would hereafter act as "an independent political organisation with its own membership, programme and statute". The Slovenian communist party changed its name to "League of Communists of Slovenia–Party of Democratic Renewal" and introduced liberal democracy in the Socialist Republic of Slovenia. The Croatian and Macedonian branches mirrored the Slovenian changes and added "Party of Democratic Change" to their names while arguing in favour of turning the LCY into a confederal party. When the LCY Presidency tried to convene the LCY Central Committee on 30 March for its 31st Session, it failed to muster a quorum, which was defined as each branch sending a minimum number of representatives to the session. Despite this, a majority of LCY Central Committee members attended the session, with the army, Bosnia-Herzegovina, Kosovo, Montenegro, Serbia and Vojvodina branches sending representatives, and with some representatives of Croatia and Macedonia showing up despite the positioning of their branches. However, during the session, representatives from Bosnia-Herzegovina staged a walkout. The 32nd Session of the Central Committee of the 13th Congress, held on 23 May, formally called for reconvening the 14th Congress on 26 May. It also decided to elect the acting president of the LCY Presidency Miomir Grbović, from Montenegro, as congress coordinator. The 14th Congress concluded by electing a provisional leadership, the Committee for the Preparation of the Congress of Democratic and Programmatic Renewal of the LCY Central Committee, headed by Montenegrin Miroslav Ivanović and tasked with convening the 15th LCY Congress. However, at the 12th Extraordinary Congress of the Serbian branch on 16–17 July, the Serbian leadership adopted a resolution that stated that the LCY "no longer exists" and stopped supporting the committee's work. With all branches eventually opposing its work, the committee—the last federal organ of the LCY—dissolved itself on 22 January 1991 and transferred all its funds and property to the League of Communists – Movement for Yugoslavia.

== Authority and powers ==
=== Status ===
The LCY Central Committee was the Party's highest decision-making body when the LCY Congress was adjourned. It was answerable to the party congress. Individual central committee members were accountable for their work to both the LCY Central Committee and the LCY Congress. While answerable to the congress, it was supervised by the Commission on Statutory Questions (CSQ) and the Supervisory Commission (SC). The LCY Central Committee had to assess questions and suggestions formulated by the CSQ and the SC. Representatives of the CSQ and the SC had the right to take part in any sessions of the LCY Central Committee, specifically, those sessions that discussed topics that one or both of these organs were tasked with supervising. The LCY Central Committee was regulated by the "Statute of the League of Communists of Yugoslavia" and, as stipulated by article 78 of the LCY statute, the "Rules of Procedure on the Organisation and Working Method of the Central Committee of the League of Communists of Yugoslavia".

As part of its mandate, the LCY Central Committee oversaw the work of the LCY as a whole and ensured that the guidelines and assignments adopted by the LCY Congress were complied with. As long as it adhered to the limits set by the LCY Congress, the LCY Central Committee had the right to develop a political platform as well as adopt political viewpoints on significant issues, such as the development of the political system and international relations, as defined by the long-term and ideological and political tasks adopted by the party congress for those areas for which it was responsible. When vital issues arose, the LCY Central Committee reviewed them and defined the LCY's political objectives. It also assessed and evaluated the activities of LCY, defining the responsibilities of its organisations and organs in ideological-political activism and cadre development. Furthermore, the LCY Central Committee examined and evaluated the actions taken by the LCY in implementing the policies enacted by the party congress, as well as the progress made in democratic relations and the advancement of collective work and responsibilities. It directed the activities of the LCY's organisation and organs that dealt with issues such as total national defence and social self-protection in accordance with the policies enacted by the congress. It was tasked with formulating swift assessments and responses to political events. It coordinated political viewpoints and opinions and initiated and directed the ideological-political activities of the central, regional, and provincial committees, the Committee for the Organisation of the LCY within the Yugoslav People's Army (YPA), as well as all members of the LCY. In addition, it evaluated and directed the implementation of LCY policies in international workers' movements and cooperated with foreign parties and activities whose realisation was the responsibility of the LCY Presidency's jurisdiction. It also had the right to elect, among its own membership, delegations to, and the Presidency of, the Federal Conference of the Socialist Alliance of Working People of Yugoslavia (SAWPY). Additionally, it was assigned the responsibility of dispatching delegations or permanent representatives of the LCY Central Committee to other forums, organs, or socio-political organisations within or outside the SAWPY per the procedures outlined in the state constitutions or the statute of the respective organisation.

=== Decision-making process ===
The LCY Presidency president convened the LCY Central Committee at his initiative or at the proposal of either the LCY Presidency, the central committee of a socialist republic, the provincial committee of an autonomous province, the Committee of the Organisation of the LCY within the YPA or by members of the LCY Central Committee. The Commission on Statury Questions, the Supervisory Commission and the LCY Central Committee commissions also had the right to convene sessions of the LCY Central Committee. The LCY Presidency president opened the sessions of the LCY Central Committee. The session's work was directed by the working presidency, composed of the presidency president, the presidency secretary and three members of the LCY Central Committee.

The LCY Central Committee had the right to set up commissions and other working bodies to examine specific problems, draft proposals, or perform certain tasks.

In conformity with the provisions of the party statute, candidates for membership of the LCY Central Committee were nominated by communal conferences and other corresponding conferences, applying a democratic procedure based on uniform criteria. Nominees for LCY Central Committee membership were decided by the congress of the LC branches of the socialist republics, provincial conferences, and the Conference of the Organisation of the LCY within the YPA, according to their respective jurisdictions. The number of members in a given electoral term of the LCY Central Committee was made by a decision of the LCY Central Committee of the prior term. That is, the 11th LCY Central Committee decided on how many members the 12th LCY Central Committee would have. Each LC republican branch had an equal number of representatives in the LCY Central Committee, each LC branch of an autonomous province had an equal number of representatives, and the Organisation of the LCY with the YPA also had a fixed number of representatives. The presidents of the republican branches, the autonomous branches and the Organisation of the LCY within the YPA were ex officio members of the LCY Central Committee. Changes in the composition of the LCY Central Committee due to changes in the ex officio presidents were ratified by the first convened LCY Central Committee session after the fact.

=== Congress and conference ===
While the LCY Statute stipulated that the party congress had to be convened every fourth year, the LCY Central Committee was tasked with convening it. A decision to convene the congress had to be adopted by the LCY Central Committee at least three months before its opening. The LCY Central Committee also decided upon the criteria for being elected as a delegate to the LCY congress in question. Members of the LCY Central Committee were ex officio delegates to the congress in question but could not vote on reports and dissolutions of organs they were members of. For example, the 21st Session of the LCY Central Committee decided to convene the 12th LCY Congress in June 1982. It also adopted an electoral regulation which described how delegates were to be nominated and elected. Later, on 9 April 1982, at the 26th Session of the LCY Central Committee, it adopted the congress agenda and the exact date for the convocation (26–29 June). It also had the right to convene extraordinary congresses of the LCY either at its own initiative or at the request of a congress of an LC republican branch or at the request of a conference of an LC autonomous branch. Similarly to the ordinary congress, the LCY Central Committee was tasked with approving the convocation of the congress at least three months before its opening after consultation with central and lower-level committees. The LCY Central Committee was also to empowered to reject suggestions to convene an extraordinary congress as they did in 1987–88. Rather than calling an extraordinary congress, the LCY opted to convene the 1st LCY Conference on 29–31 May 1988.

The LCY Central Committee convened the conference between two congresses when it thought it necessary to get insight from members of basic organisations on specific policy questions. The LCY Central Committee had the sole right to convene the conference. The LCY Presidency, a republican branch central committee and the provincial committee of an autonomous province had the right to propose the convocation of a party conference to the LCY Central Committee, which it could either accept or reject. LCY Central Committee members were, by right of office, delegates to an LCY Conference. Regarding the 1st LCY Conference of 1988, calls for convening it came from local and republican organisations. After these proposals, the 11th Session of the Central Committee of the 13th LCY Congress, held on 7–8 December 1987, decided to convene the congress, but no date was fixed, but it was preliminary convened for late March. It was the 13th Session of the LCY Central Committee, which convened on 28 February 1988, that scheduled the conference to convene in May.

=== Political-executive organ ===
The political-executive organ of the LCY Central Committee was the presidency, officially the "Presidency of the Central Committee of the League of Communists of Yugoslavia". To be eligible for election to the LCY Presidency, one had to be a member of the LCY Central Committee. Changes in the composition of the presidency were determined through elections conducted within the republican and autonomous provincial branches and within the Committee of the Organisation of the LCY within the YPA. During an electoral term, the LCY Central Committee could not adopt compositional changes that surpassed more than one-third of the presidency's total membership. The presidency was headed by the "President of the Presidency of the LCY Central Committee" in collaboration with the "Secretary of the Presidency of the LCY Central Committee".

== Bibliography ==
=== Archives ===
- Andrejevich, Milan (1989a). "LCY To Hold Extraordinary Party Congress". Situation Report (16 May 1989). Radio Free Europe/Radio Liberty Research: 21–23.
- Andrejevich, Milan (1989b). "Slovenian Communists Suggest Breaking Away From the League of Communists of Yugoslavia". Situation Report (16 May 1989). Radio Free Europe/Radio Liberty Research: 3–4.
- Staff writer (1974). "Adoption of New Constitution. — Election of New Assembly of Federal Republic. — Marshal Tito elected President of Federal Republic for Unlimited Term. — New Collective Presidency and Federal Executive Council. — 10th Congress of League of Communists of Yugoslavia. — Related Developments". Keesing's Record of World Events. 20 (1, January 1974). Keesing’s Record of World Events: 26655.
- Staff writer (1990a). "Collapse of federal communist Party congress — Appointments". Keesing's Record of World Events. 36 (1, January 1990). Keesing’s Record of World Events: 37172.
- Staff writer (1990b). "Independence declaration by Slovene communists". Keesing's Record of World Events. 36 (2, February 1990). Keesing’s Record of World Events: 37255.
- Staff writer (1990c). "Worsening crisis in LCY". Keesing's Record of World Events. 36 (3, March 1990). Keesing’s Record of World Events: 37324.
- Staff writer (1990d). "New state President–Warning on country's disintegration–Non-communist governments in Slovenia and Croatia". Keesing's Record of World Events. 36 (5, May 1990). Keesing’s Record of World Events: 37463.
- Stanković, Slobodan (1984a). "Reform of Yugoslav Party under Discussion". Situation Report (30 November 1984). Radio Free Europe/Radio Liberty Research: 2–5.
- Stanković, Slobodan (1984b). "Diversity of Views on Reform and Recovery". Situation Report (30 November 1984). Radio Free Europe/Radio Liberty Research: 10–12.
- Stanković, Slobodan (1985a). "LCY Central Committee Deplores Serious Disunity in Party Ranks". Situation Report (12 August 1985). Radio Free Europe/Radio Liberty Research: 3–6.
- Stanković, Slobodan (1985b). "Yugoslav Central Committee Demands Discipline". Situation Report (3 September 1985). Radio Free Europe/Radio Liberty Research: 1–4.
- Stanković, Slobodan (1986). "13th LCY Congress". Situation Report (17 July 1986). Radio Free Europe/Radio Liberty Research: 2–7.

=== Books and thesises ===
- Историја Савеза комуниста Југославије [History of the League of Communists of Yugoslavia] (in Serbo-Croatian). Publishing Center "Komunist"; Narodna knjiga; Rad. 1985. COBISS 68649479
- Burg, Steven L. (1983). Conflict and Cohesion in Socialist Yugoslavia: Political Decision Making since 1966. Princeton University Press. ISBN 0-691-07651-0.
- Carter, April (1982). Democratic Reform in Yugoslavia: The Changing Role of the Party. Frances Pinter Publishers. ISBN 0-903804-88-3.
- Furtak, Robert (1986). The Political Systems of the Socialist States: An Introduction to Marxist–Leninist Regimes. The Harvester Press Publishing Group. ISBN 0-7450-0048-7.
- Hardman, Helen (2012). Gorbachev's Export of Perestroika to Eastern Europe: Democratisation Reconsidered. Manchester University Press. ISBN 978-0-7190-7978-8.
- Hazan, Baruch (1985). The East European Political System: Instruments of Power. Westview Press. ISBN 0-8133-7064-7.
- Klemenčič, Matjaž; Žagar, Mitja (2004). The Former Yugoslavia's Diverse Peoples: A Reference Sourcebook. ABC-CLIO. ISBN 1-57607-294-0.
- Jancar, Barbara (1985). "Chapter 9: The New Feminism in Yugoslavia". In Ramet, Pedro (ed.). Yugoslavia in the 1980s. Westview Special Studies on the Soviet Union and Eastern Europe. Westview Press. ISBN 0-8133-7012-4.
- Jović, Dejan (2009). Yugoslavia: A State that Withered Away. Purdue University Press. ISBN 978-1-55753-495-8.
- McCrea, Barbara P. (1969). The Yugoslav Communist Party: Decentralization and Reorganization (Thesis). Western Michigan University. Archived from the original on 28 September 2023.
- Neal, Fred Warner (1958). Titoism in Action: The Reforms in Yugoslavia After 1948. University of California Press. ISBN 978-0-520-35044-1.
- Pirjevec, Jože (2018). Tito and His Comrades. University of Wisconsin Press. ISBN 9780299317706.
- Shaffer, Harry G. (1967). "Yugoslavia's "Own Road to Socialism": A Non-Marxist View". In Shaffer, Harry G. (ed.). The Communist World: Marxist and Non-Marxist Views (2nd ed.). Meredith Publishing Company. pp. 223–259. ISBN 9780891970934.
- Simons, Williams B.; White, Stephen, eds. (1984). "The Statute of the League of Communists of Yugoslavia". The Party Statutes of the Communist World. Law in Eastern Europe. Martinus Nijhoff Publishers. pp. 485–533. ISBN 90-247-2975-0.
- Stanković, Slobodan (1981). Staar, Richard F. (ed.). The End of the Tito Era: Yugoslavia's Dilemmas. Hoover International Studies. Hoover Institution Press. ISBN 9780817973629.

=== Journal articles and reports ===
- Cohen, Leonard J. (1979). "Partisans, Professionals, and Proletarians: Elite Change in Yugoslavia, 1952–78". Canadian Slavonic Papers. 21 (4): 446–478. doi:10.1080/00085006.1979.11091597. JSTOR 40867634.
- Johnson, A. Ross (1983). Political Leadership in Yugoslavia: Evolution of the League of Communists (PDF). United States Department of State. Archived (PDF) from the original on 2 June 2023.
- Miller, Robert F. (1982). "The 12th congress of the league of communists of Yugoslavia: The succession process continues". Australian Outlook. 36 (3): 11–18. doi:10.1080/10357718208444789.
- Neal, Fred Warner (1957). "The Communist Party in Yugoslavia". The American Political Science Review. 51 (1): 88–111. doi:10.2307/1951773. JSTOR 1951773. S2CID 146357000.
- Ramet, Pedro (1984). "Political Struggle and Institutional Reorganization in Yugoslavia". Political Science Quarterly. 99 (2): 289–301. doi:10.2307/2150406. JSTOR 2150406.
- Remington, Robin Alison (1987). "Nation versus Class in Yugoslavia". Current History. 86 (523): 365–368. JSTOR 45315975.
- Shoup, Paul (1959). "Problems of Party Reform in Yugoslavia". The American Slavic and East European Review. 18 (3): 334–350. doi:10.2307/3004130. JSTOR 3004130.
- Singleton, F.B. (1980). "Yugoslavia without Tito". The World Today. 36 (6): 204–208. JSTOR 40395190.
