= Central Committee of the 13th Congress of the League of Communists of Yugoslavia =

This electoral term of the Central Committee was elected by the 13th Congress of the League of Communists of Yugoslavia (LCY) in 1986, and was in session until the election of the Committee for the Preparation of the Democratic and Programmatic Renewal (CPDPR) by the 14th Congress on 26 May 1990. The CPDPR failed to convene the 15th LCY Congress and dissolved itself on 22 January 1991, marking the official dissolution of the LCY.

== Composition ==
Members of the Central Committee of the 13th Congress of the League of Communists of Yugoslavia
Name	12th	Birth	PM	Death	Branch	Nationality	Gender	Ref.
Muhamed Abadžić	By-election	1945	?	2022	Bosnia-Herzegovina	Muslim	Male	
Mato Andrić	Old	1928	1945	2015	Bosnia-Herzegovina	Croat	Male	
Miloš Bajčetić	New	1931	?	2016	Yugoslav People's Army	Serb	Male	
Aleksandar Bakočević	By-election	1928	1948	2007	Serbia	Serb	Male	
Siniša Batalo	By-election	?	?	?	Vojvodina	Serb?	Male	
Dimitrije Baucal	New	1937	?	2005	Yugoslav People's Army	Serb	Male	
Dušan Bić	New	?	?	?	Serbia	Slovene?	Male	
Pandora Blaževa	By-election	?	?	?	Macedonia	Macedonian	Female	
Marko Brdarić	By-election	?	?	?	Croatia	Croat	Male	
Ivan Brigić	New	1936	1957	2015	Bosnia-Herzegovina	Croat	Male	
Stane Brovet	New	1930	?	2007	Yugoslav People's Army	Slovene	Male	
Josip Bukovčan	New	1930	?	?	Croatia	Croat	Male	
Radoslav Bulajić	New	1935	?	?	Montenegro	Montenegrin	Male	
Momir Bulatović	New	1956	?	2019	Montenegro	Montenegrin	Male	
Seniha Bulja	New	?	?	?	Bosnia-Herzegovina	Muslim	Female	
Simeon Bunčić	New	1928	1943	?	Yugoslav People's Army	Serb	Male	
Ali Buza	By-election	?	?	?	Kosovo	Albanian	Male	
Branko Caratan	By-election	1938	?	Alive	Croatia	Croat	Male	
Nufran Ćato	New	?	?	?	Macedonia		Male	
Tomo Cerjan	New	1943	?	Alive	Croatia	Croat	Male	
Dušan Čkrebić	Old	1927	1945	2022	Serbia	Serb	Male	
Darja Colarič	New	1952	1978	Alive	Slovenia	Slovene	Female	
Nikola Čubra	By-election	1933	?	?	Yugoslav People's Army	Croat	Male	
Dušica Danilović	New	?	?	?	Serbia	Serb	Female	
Ladislav Daraboš	New	?	?	?	Vojvodina	Hungarian?	Male	
Božidar Debenjak	By-election	1935	?	Alive	Slovenia	Slovene	Male	
Enver Gjerqeku	New	1928	?	2008	Kosovo	Albanian	Male	
Tereza Dimić	New	1954	?	Alive	Croatia	Croat	Female	
Dimitar Dimidžievski	New	?	?	?	Macedonia	Macedonian	Male	
Suzana Dinevska	New	?	?	?	Macedonia	Macedonian	Female	
Raif Dizdarević	Old	1926	1945	2026	Bosnia-Herzegovina	Muslim	Male	
Ampo Djordjevski	By-election	?	?	?	Macedonia	Macedonian	Male	
Stane Dolanc	Old	1925	1944	1999	Slovenia	Slovene	Male	
Svetislav Dolašević	Old	1926	1945	1995	Kosovo	Serb	Male	
Janos Domakoš	By-election	?	?	?	Vojvodina	Hungarian	Male	
Dali Đonlagić	New	1930	1948	2019	Slovenia	Slovene/Muslim	Male	
Angel Dragašev	New	?	?	?	Macedonia	Macedonian	Male	
Dušan Dragosavac	Old	1919	1942	2014	Croatia	Serb	Male	
Ivo Družić	New	1950	?	Alive	Croatia	Croat	Male	
Milo Đukanović	New	1962	1979	Alive	Montenegro	Montenegrin	Male	
Nijaz Duraković	New	1949	?	2012	Bosnia-Herzegovina	Muslim	Male	
Darinka Đurašković	By-election	?	?	?	Bosnia-Herzegovina		Female	
Sreten Đurić	By-election	?	?	?	Serbia		Male	
Mladen Đurin	New	?	?	?	Vojvodina		Male	
Josip Eterović	New	?	?	?	Croatia	Croat	Male	
Anđelija Filipović	New	?	?	?	Bosnia-Herzegovina		Female	
Omer Filipović	New	?	?	?	Bosnia-Herzegovina	Muslim	Male	
Slobodan Filipović	New	1939	1959	1995	Montenegro	Montenegrin	Male	
Blagoje Franceski	New	?	?	?	Macedonia	Macedonian	Male	
Radiša Gačić	New	1938	1957	Alive	Serbia	Serb	Male	
Vangel Gagačev	New	1941	?	2022	Macedonia	Macedonian	Male	
Veljko Galić	New	?	?	?	Bosnia-Herzegovina		Male	
Milan Gorjanc	New	1943	?	Alive	Yugoslav People's Army	Slovene	Male	
Miomir Grbović	New	1951	1973	Alive	Montenegro	Montenegrin	Male	
Božidar Grubišić	New	1932	1951	2021	Yugoslav People's Army	Croat	Male	
Vinko Hafner	New	1920	1940	2015	Slovenia	Slovene	Male	
Gojko Hajduković	New	?	?	?	Croatia		Male	
Sinan Hasani	Old	1922	1942	2010	Kosovo	Albanian	Male	
Vladimir Hodalj	New	1947=?	?	2019/21?	Yugoslav People's Army		Male	
Ahmet Hodžić	New	1923	?	?	Yugoslav People's Army	Muslim	Male	
Hrvoje Ištuk	New	1935	1954	2002	Bosnia-Herzegovina	Croat	Male	
Mitar Janjić	New	?	?	?	Vojvodina		Male	
Branko Jerčinović	New	?	?	?	Croatia		Male	
Radivoje Jokić	New	?	?	?	Montenegro	Montenegrin	Male	
Ljupčo Jordanovski	New	1953	?	2010	Macedonia	Macedonian	Male	
Lambe Jovanoski	New	?	?	?	Macedonia	Macedonian	Male	
Neradža Jovanov	New	?	?	?	Serbia	Serb	Male	
Radovan Jovanov	New	?	?	?	Vojvodina	Serb	Male	
Nikola Jovanović	New	1925	?	?	Serbia	Serb	Male	
Georgije Jovićić	Ex-officio	1927	1943	2011	Yugoslav People's Army	Montenegrin	Male	
Vjekoslav Juričić	New	1938	?	?	Croatia	Croat	Male	
Ivo Karamarko	Old	1945	?	Alive	Croatia	Croat	Male	
Milka Kiković	New	?	?	?	Serbia	Serb	Female	
Dragan Kalinić	New	1948	?	Alive	Bosnia-Herzegovina	Serb	Male	
Dragan Kragulj	New	?	?	?	Bosnia-Herzegovina		Male	
Momčilo Knežević	New	?	?	?	Montenegro	Montenegrin	Male	
Vojislav Knežević	New	1924	?	?	Bosnia-Herzegovina	Serb	Male	
Janez Kocijančič	New	1941	?	2020	Slovenia	Slovene	Male	
Rudi Kolak	Old	1918	1940	2004	Bosnia-Herzegovina	Croat	Male	
Martina Kolar	New	1949	1973	Alive	Slovenia	Slovene	Female	
Štefan Korošec	Return	1938	1957	2014	Slovenia	Slovene	Male	
Dragutin Kosovac	Old	1924	1941	2012	Bosnia-Herzegovina	Serb	Male	
Radoje Kostadinović	New	?	?	?	Serbia	Serb	Male	
Andjelka Kovačević	New	1941	?	Alive	Montenegro	Montenegrin	Female	
Sergej Kraigher	Old	1914	1934	2001	Slovenia	Slovene	Male	
Zdenko Krajina	New	?	?	?	Croatia		Male	
Adem Krasniqi	New	?	?	?	Kosovo	Albanian	Male	
Lev Kreft	New	1951	?	Alive	Slovenia	Slovene	Male	
Haralampi Krstevski	New	?	?	?	Macedonia	Macedonian	Male	
Svetozar Krstić	New	?	?	?	Vojvodina	Serb	Male	
Dara Krnetić	New	?	?	?	Bosnia-Herzegovina	Serb	Female	
Antun Kruljac	New	1946	?	Alive	Croatia	Croat	Male	
Boško Krunić	Old	1929	1946	2017	Vojvodina	Serb	Male	
Borivoje Kuč	New	?	?	?	Montenegro		Male	
Milan Kučan	Ex-officio	1941	1958	Alive	Slovenia	Slovene	Male	
Muhiba Kulović	New	?	?	?	Bosnia-Herzegovina	Muslim	Female	
Dragana Labus	New	?	?	?	Vojvodina	Serb	Female	
Branko Lađević	New	?	?	?	Serbia	Serb	Male	
Mihailo Lalić	New	1914	?	1992	Montenegro	Serb	Male	
Jakov Lazaroski	Ex-officio	1936	1953	2021	Macedonia	Macedonian	Male	
Marko Lolić	Old	1936	1955	?	Croatia	Serb	Male	
Vukašin Lončar	New	?	?	?	Vojvodina	Serb	Male	
Anton Lukežić	New	1926	?	2000	Yugoslav People's Army	Croat	Male	
Nandor Major	Old	1931	1952	2022	Vojvodina	Hungarian	Male	
Mladenko Maksimović	New	1926	?	?	Yugoslav People's Army		Male	
Branko Mamula	Old	1921	1942	2021	Yugoslav People's Army	Serb	Male	
Mijo Maruš	New	?	?	?	Bosnia-Herzegovina		Male	
Ante Marković	New	1924	1943	2011	Croatia	Croat	Male	
Krste Markovski	Old	1925	1941	?	Macedonia	Macedonian	Male	
Petar Matić	Old	1920	1940	2024	Yugoslav People's Army	Serb	Male	
Liman Matoši	New	?	?	?	Kosovo	Albanian	Male	
Ljubomir Međeši	New	?	?	?	Vojvodina	Hungarian?	Male	
Suljo Mehić	New	1945	?	2020	Bosnia-Herzegovina	Muslim	Male	
Ahmet Mehović	Old	1950	1974	Alive	Montenegro	Muslim	Male	
Esad Merdić	New	?	?	?	Bosnia-Herzegovina	Muslim	Male	
Munir Mesihović	Old	1928	1946	2016	Bosnia-Herzegovina	Muslim	Male	
Vukašin Mićunović	New	1919	1939	2005	Serbia	Serb	Male	
Ivan Mihaljev	New	?	?	?	Vojvodina		Male	
Borislav Mikelić	New	1939	?	2018	Croatia	Serb?	Male	
Dragan Miković	New	?	?	?	Montenegro		Male	
Branko Mikulić	Old	1928	1945	1994	Bosnia-Herzegovina	Croat	Male	
Mihajlo Milojević	New	?	?	?	Serbia	Serb	Male	
Slobodan Milošević	Ex-officio	1941	1959	2006	Serbia	Serb	Male	
Stevan Mirković	New	1927	1945	2015	Yugoslav People's Army	Serb	Male	
Blagoje Mitanovski	New	?	?	?	Macedonia	Macedonian	Male	
Biljana Mitrović	New	?	?	?	Vojvodina	Serb	Female	
Lazar Mojsov	Old	1920	1940	2011	Macedonia	Macedonian	Male	
Rahman Morina	New	1943	1969	1990	Kosovo	Albanian	Male	
Said Mujkanović	New	?	?	?	Bosnia-Herzegovina	Muslim	Male	
Boris Muževič	Old	1949	1968	2025	Slovenia	Slovene	Male	
Đuro Nemet	New	1928	?	2003	Croatia	Croat	Male	
Andrija Nikić	New	?	?	?	Montenegro		Male	
Branka Obrenić	New	?	?	?	Montenegro		Female	
Borislav Odadžić	New	1946	?	Alive	Vojvodina	Serb	Male	
Marko Orlandić	Old	1930	1948	2019	Montenegro	Montenegrin	Male	
Marjan Orožen	Return	1930	1948	2015	Slovenia	Slovene	Male	
Milica Ozbič	New	1929	1953	2014	Slovenia	Slovene	Female	
Tosum Pahumi	New	?	?	?	Macedonia	Albanian	Male	
Jovo Panajotović	New	?	?	?	Macedonia	Macedonian	Male	
Milan Pančevski	Old	1935	1957	2019	Macedonia	Macedonian	Male	
Milica Pejanović	New	1935	?	?	Montenegro		Female	
Muzaver Pepić	New	?	?	?	Montenegro		Male	
Mihajlo Pešić	New	?	?	?	Serbia		Male	
Marica Petrović	New	1951	?	Alive	Bosnia-Herzegovina	Croat	Female	
Milka Planinc	Old	1924	1944	2010	Croatia	Croat	Female	
Jordan Pop-Jordanov	New	1925	?	2024	Macedonia	Macedonian	Male	
Milovan Popović	New	?	?	?	Serbia		Male	
Hamdija Pozderac	Old	1924	1943	1988	Bosnia-Herzegovina	Muslim	Male	
Trajko Prendžov	New	?	?	?	Macedonia	Macedonian	Male	
Ivica Račan	Old	1944	1959	2007	Croatia	Croat	Male	
Radovan Radonjić	New	1936	?	Alive	Montenegro		Male	
Ljubomir Radović	New	?	?	?	Kosovo		Male	
Miljan Radović	Ex-officio	1933	1951	2015	Montenegro	Montenegrin	Male	
Tomislav Radević	New	?	?	?	Serbia		Male	
Hašim Redžepi	New	1958	?	?	Kosovo	Albanian	Male	
Bogoljub Redžić	New	1934	?	2022	Yugoslav People's Army	Serb	Male	
Milanko Renovica	New	1928	1947	2013	Bosnia-Herzegovina	Serb	Male	
Ali Šabani	New	?	?	?	Kosovo	Albanian	Male	
Stevan Santo	New	1946	1972	2018	Vojvodina	Hungarian	Male	
Enver Šehović	New	?	?	?	Croatia	Muslim?	Male	
Zorka Sekulović	Old	1938	1961	?	Montenegro	Montenegrin	Female	
Maksimilijan Senica	New	1946	1974	?	Slovenia	Slovene	Male	
Franc Šetinc	New	1929	1948	2016	Slovenia	Slovene	Male	
Franc Šifkovič	New	1939	1967	?	Slovenia	Slovene	Male	
Branislav Simić	New	1924	?	2002	Bosnia-Herzegovina	Serb	Male	
Petar Šimić	New	1932	1948	1990	Yugoslav People's Army	Croat	Male	
Dobrivoje Simonović	New	?	?	?	Serbia	Serb	Male	
Nedeljko Šipovac	New	1942	1960	2025	Vojvodina	Serb	Male	
Kolj Široka	Old	1922	1941	1994	Kosovo	Albanian	Male	
Petar Škundrić	New	1947	1965	Alive	Serbia	Serb	Male	
Jože Slokar	New	1934	1964	2022	Slovenia	Slovene	Male	
Drago Šofranac	Old	1942	1964	?	Montenegro	Montenegrin	Male	
Andrej Spasov	New	?	?	?	Macedonia	Macedonian	Male	
Borisav Srebrić	New	1927	1945	1997	Serbia	Serb	Male	
Milica Stanivuković	New	?	?	?	Croatia	Serb	Female	
Boris Stankovski	New	?	?	?	Macedonia	Macedonian	Male	
Vlajko Stoiljković	New	?	?	?	Serbia	Serb	Male	
Ivan Stojanović	New	1940	?	1996	Serbia	Serb	Male	
Nikola Stojanović	Old	1933	1952	2020	Bosnia-Herzegovina	Serb	Male	
Stanislav Stojanović	Old	1937	1958	?	Serbia	Serb	Male	
Stanko Stojčević	Ex-officio	1929	1944	2009	Croatia	Serb	Male	
Đorđe Stojšić	Ex-officio	1928	1945	2014	Vojvodina	Serb	Male	
Borut Šuklje	New	1958	1974	2022	Slovenia	Slovene	Male	
Ali Šukrija	Old	1919	1939	2005	Kosovo	Albanian	Male	
Stipe Šuvar	New	1936	1955	2004	Croatia	Croat	Male	
Taip Taipi	Old	1924	1944	2001	Macedonia	Albanian	Male	
Darinka Tešić	By-election	?	?	?	Bosnia-Herzegovina		Female	
Dragomir Dragan Tomić	New	1935	?	2022	Serbia	Serb	Male	
Stanko Tomić	Return	1926	1943	?	Bosnia-Herzegovina	Serb	Male	
Nedelko Trajkovski	New	?	?	?	Macedonia	Macedonian	Male	
Bogdan Trifunović	New	1933	1950	2007	Serbia	Serb	Male	
Vasil Tupurkovski	New	1951	1973	Alive	Macedonia	Macedonian	Male	
Igor Uršič	New	1943	1960	Alive	Slovenia	Slovene	Male	
Milan Uzelac	Ex-officio	1932	1949	2005	Bosnia-Herzegovina	Serb	Male	
Uglješa Uzelac	Old	1938	?	1997	Bosnia-Herzegovina	Muslim	Male	
Ljubomir Varošlija	New	?	?	Dead	Macedonia	Macedonian	Male	
Matija Vaslović	New	?	?	?	Vojvodina		Male	
Mehiba Vehović	New	?	?	?	Bosnia-Herzegovina	Muslim	Female	
Sanije Veselji	New	?	?	?	Kosovo	Albanian	Female	
Dobrivoje Vidić	Old	1918	1939	1992	Serbia	Serb	Male	
Radovan Vlajković	Old	1922	1943	2001	Vojvodina	Serb	Male	
Azem Vllasi	Ex-officio	1948	1965	Alive	Kosovo	Albanian	Male	
Josip Vrhovec	Old	1926	1944	2006	Croatia	Croat	Male	
Milutin Vukašinović	New	1944	?	?	Montenegro	Montenegrin	Male	
Pero Vukotić	New	1945	1953	?	Montenegro	Montenegrin	Male	
Mlađen Vuković	New	1935	?	Alive	Montenegro	Montenegrin	Male	
Dragica Zagrebec	New	?	?	?	Croatia	Croat	Female	
Janez Zahrastnik	New	1937	1955	?	Slovenia	Slovene	Male	
Vidoje Žarković	Old	1927	1943	2000	Montenegro	Montenegrin	Male	
Jusuf Zejnullahu	New	1944	?	?	Kosovo	Albanian	Male	
Janez Zemljarič	Old	1928	1947	2022	Slovenia	Slovene	Male	
Snežana Zlatari	New	?	?	?	Vojvodina		Female	
Janko Zupančič	New	1952	1974	?	Slovenia	Slovene	Male	

== Bibliography ==
=== Books ===
- League of Communists of Croatia (1978). "Osmi kongres Savez komunista Hrvatske" [8th Congress of the League of Communists of Croatia]. Stenografske bilješke. 4 (8). League of Communists of Croatia.
- Djokić, Dejan (2023). A Concise History of Serbia. Cambridge University Press. ISBN 978-1-107-02838-8.
- Hetemi, Atdhe (2020). Student Movements for the Republic of Kosovo: 1968, 1981 and 1997. Springer International Publishing. ISBN 978-3-030-54951-0.
- Kravchenko, Leonid Petrovich (1990). Кто есть кто в мировой политике [Who's Who in World Politics] (in Russian). Publishing House of Political Literature. ISBN 9785250005135.
- Lewytzkyj, Borys; Stroynowski, Juliusz, eds. (1978). Who's Who in the Socialist Countries. K. G. Saur Verlag. ISBN 3-7940-3017-6.
- Marković, Dragan; Kržavac, Savo (1985). Zašto su smenjivani [Why Were They Replaced?] (in Serbo-Croatian). Partizanska knj.
- McFarlane, Bruce J. (1988). Yugoslavia: Politics, Economics, and Society. Pinter Publishers. ISBN 9780861874521.
- Plut-Pregelj, Leopoldina; Kranjc, Gregor; Lazarević, Žarko; Rogel, Carole (2018). Historical Dictionary of Slovenia. Rowman & Littlefield Publishers. ISBN 9781538111062.
- Ristovski, Blazé (2009). Македонска енциклопедија [Macedonian Encyclopedia] (in Macedonian). Macedonian Academy of Sciences and Arts. ISBN 978-608-203-023-4. OCLC 499142958.
- Schneider, Henrique (2016). Indifferenz, Gegnerschaft, Identität Veränderungen im politischen Verhältnis von Dorf und Staat im Kosovo [Indifference, Opposition, Identity Changes in the Political Relationship Between Village and State in Kosovo] (in German). BWV Berliner Wissenschafts-Verlag. ISBN 978-3-8305-3717-5.
- Rajović, Radošin, ed. (1970). Jugoslovenski savremenici: Ko je ko u Jugoslaviji [Yugoslav Contemporaries: Who's Who in Yugoslavia] (in Serbo-Croatian). Hronometar.
- Rusinow, Dennison (2015). Martin McCauley & Stephen Carter (ed.). Leadership and Succession in the Soviet Union, Eastern Europe and Asia. Routledge. ISBN 978-0-87332-347-5.
- Staff writer (1968). Osmi kongres Saveza omladine Jugoslavije [Eighth Congress of the Youth Association of Yugoslavia] (in Serbian). People's Youth Organisation of Yugoslavia.
- Staff writer (1986). Directory of Yugoslav officials: A Reference Aid. Reference aid. University of Michigan.
- Staff writer (1990). Directory of Yugoslav officials: A Reference Aid. Reference aid. University of Michigan.
- Stanković, Slobodan (1981). Staar, Richard F. (ed.). The End of the Tito Era: Yugoslavia's Dilemmas. Hoover International Studies. Hoover Institution Press. ISBN 9780817973629.
- Stroynowski, Juliusz, ed. (1989a). Who's Who in the Socialist Countries of Europe: A–H. K. G. Saur Verlag. ISBN 3-598-10719-6.
- Stroynowski, Juliusz, ed. (1989b). Who's Who in the Socialist Countries of Europe: I–O. K. G. Saur Verlag. ISBN 3-598-10719-6.
- Stroynowski, Juliusz, ed. (1989c). Who's Who in the Socialist Countries of Europe: P–Z. K. G. Saur Verlag. ISBN 3-598-10719-6.

=== Newspaper archives ===
- Staff writer (21 February 1989). "Mogući još jedan vodič" [Another Possible Candidates]. Borba (in Serbo-Croatian). Socialist Alliance of Working People: 1.
- Staff writer (21 February 1989). "Novi članovi Predsedništva CK SKJ" [New members of the Presidency of the CC LCY]. Borba (in Serbo-Croatian). Socialist Alliance of Working People: 1.
- Staff writer (17 March 1989). "Biografije članova Saveznog izvršnog veća" [Biographies of members of the Federal Executive Council]. Borba (in Serbo-Croatian). Socialist Alliance of Working People: 1.
- Staff writer (23 September 1987). "генерал Стеван Мирковић, начелник Генералштаба Југословенске народне армије" [General Stevan Mirković, Chief of the General Staff of the Yugoslav People's Army]. Borba (in Serbo-Croatian). Socialist Alliance of Working People: 1.
- Staff writer (29 June 1986). "Председништво ЦК СКЈ" [Presidency of the CC LCY]. Borba (in Serbo-Croatian). Socialist Alliance of Working People: 1.
- Staff writer (28 April 1984). "Светислав Долашевићп редседник" [Svetislav Dolašević President]. Borba (in Serbo-Croatian). Socialist Alliance of Working People: 1.
- Staff writer (30 June 1982). "Централни комитет Савеза комуниста Југославије" [Central Committee of the League of Communists of Yugoslavia]. Borba (in Serbo-Croatian). Socialist Alliance of Working People: 6.
- Staff writer (17 May 1982). "Чланови Савезног извршног већа" [Members of the Federal Executive Council]. Borba (in Serbo-Croatian). Socialist Alliance of Working People: 4.
- "Централни комитет Савеза комуниста Југославије" [Central Committee of the League of Communists of Yugoslavia]. Borba (in Serbo-Croatian). Socialist Alliance of Working People: 8. 24 June 1978.
- "Вукашин Мићуновић" [Vukašin Mićunović]. Borba (in Serbo-Croatian). Socialist Alliance of Working People: 13. 15 June 1969.

=== Websites ===
- "Preminuo Dušan Čkrebić" [Dušan Čkrebić passed away] (in Bosnian). Banjaluka.net. 8 April 2022.
- Allcock, John B. (2023). "Slobodan Milošević: president of Yugoslavia". Britannica Encyclopaedia.
- "Radovan Radonjić" [Radovan Radonjić] (in Croatian). Disput.
- "In memoriam: Franc Šetinc (1929–2016)" [In memoriam: Franc Šetinc (1929–2016)]. Dnevnik (in Slovenian). 25 February 2016.
- "Me kënd është i varrosur Rrahman Morina në një varr në Beograd" [Who is buried by Rrahman Morina in a tomb in Belgrade]. Gazeta Infokus (in Albanian). 16 January 2018.
- "Borut Šuklje (1958 - 2022)" [Borut Šuklje (1958 - 2022)] (in Slovenian). Government of Slovenia. 20 June 2022.
- "Godišnjica smrti Uglješe Uzelca" [Anniversary of the death of Ugljaša Uzelac] (in Bosnian). Historija.ba. 6 September 1997.
- "19 years ago, on 22 February 2002, Hrvoje Ištuk died" [Prije 19 godina, 22. veljače 2002. godine, umro je Hrvoje Ištuk] (in Croatian). HKD Napredak. 22 February 2021.
- Judah, Tim (7 June 2006). "The Razor". Politico Europe.
- "Stane Brovet" [Stane Brovet] (in Serbian). Military Intelligence Agency. 2023.
- "Почина Вангел Гагачев" [Vangel Gagachev died]. MKD (in Macedonian). 3 November 2022.
- Nikolic, Maja (10 January 2019). "Petrović: Jezik najčešće mijenjanju oni koji nisu stručni" [Petrovic: The language is most often changed by those who are not experts]. Radio Slobodna Evropa (in Croatian). Radio Free Europe/Radio Liberty.
- "Aleksandar Bakočević" [Aleksandar Bakočević]. Olympedia. 2023.
- "Лустриран починатиот Љубомир Варошлија, екс-министер за полиција" [Lustratized deceased Miodrag Varosha, ex-police minister] (in Macedonian). Online Nova TV. 4 November 2013.
- "U bogatoj karijeri Abadžić je bio i političar i sportista i privrednik, direktor Oslobođenja i osnivač aviokompanije" [In his rich career, Abadžić was a politician, athlete and businessman, director of Oslobođenje and founder of an airline]. Oslobođenje (in Bosnian). 2022.
- "Preminuo Enver Đerđeku" [Enver Đerđeku passed away] (in Albanian). Pcnen.com. 24 October 2008.
- Peterka, Franc (1989). "Bunčić, Simeon" [Bunčić, Simeon]. Croatian Biographical Lexicon (in Croatian). Archived from the original on 6 December 2024.
- Bartolović, Sandra (30 April 2007). "Ivica Račan 1944-2007" [Ivica Račan 1944-2007]. Poslovni dnevnik (in Serbian).
- Radaljac, Danko (9 April 2015). "'Strogo povjerljivo': Petra Šimića, »kočničara« rata, smaknuli jastrebovi JNA" ['Top Secret': Petar Šimić, the "brakeman" of the war, executed by JNA hawks]. Novi list (in Serbian).
- "Преминуо Драган Томић, некадашњи председник Народне скупштине" [Dragan Tomić, former Speaker of the National Assembly, has died] (in Serbian). Radio Television of Serbia. 21 June 2022.
- "Времеплов (17. август 2019)" [Time Machine (17 August 2019)] (in Serbian). Radio Television of Serbia. 17 August 2019.
- "Vremeplov (28. decembar 2016)" [Time machine (December 28, 2016)] (in Serbian). Radio Television of Serbia. 28 December 2016.
- "Umro general Stevan Mirković" [General Stevan Mirković has died] (in Serbian). Radio Television of Serbia. 29 September 2015.
- "Jakov Lazaroski, university professor and president of the Presidency of the Central Committee of SCM, has died". Sloboden Pečat. 16 May 2021.
- "Komitet Organizacije SKJ u JNA: Predsjednik Grubišić" [Organisation Committee of the SKJ in the JNA: President Grubišić]. Slobodna Dalmacija (in Croatian). 26 May 1990. Archived from the original on 19 September 2023.
- "Božidar Grubišić" [Božidar Grubišić]. Slobodna Dalmacija (in Croatian). 2 June 2021. Archived from the original on 18 September 2023.
- "Branko Caratan – Životopis" [Branko Caratan – Curriculum vitae] (in Croatian). Social Democratic Party of Croatia. 8 April 2022.
- "Matične vesti: Rođeni, venčani i preminuli (od 26. novembra do 2. decembra 2018. godine)" [Home News: Born, married and deceased (from 26 November to 2 December 2018)] (in Serbian). Subotica Assembly. 3 December 2018.
- Torov, Ivan (1990). "Pancevski Replaced by Grbovic as LCY Chief". Daily Report: East Europe. Vol. 101–110. Foreign Broadcast Information Service. p. 46.
