= Secretary of the Presidency of the League of Communists of Yugoslavia =

Secretary of the League of Communists of Yugoslavia
- Sekretar Predsjedništva Centralnog komiteta Saveza komunista Jugoslavije (Serbo-Croatian)
- Emblem of the LCY

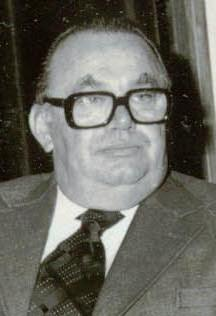
- Longest serving Stane Dolanc; 27 January 1972 – 15 May 1979
- Seat: Palace of Socio-Political Organisations, Belgrade
- Appointer: Central Committee
- Formation: 4 October 1966
- First holder: Mijalko Todorović
- Final holder: Petar Škundrić (acting)
- Abolished: 27 May 1990

The secretary of the Presidency of the Central Committee of the League of Communists of Yugoslavia (LCY) was the administrative leader of the LCY Presidency and worked alongside the LCY president to lead the aforementioned body.

A predecessor to this office, the Secretary of the Executive Bureau, existed from 1966 to 1969.

== Officeholders ==
Secretaries of the Presidency of the League of Communists of Yugoslavia
No.	Name	Took office	Left office	Tenure	Term	Birth	PM	Death	Branch	Ethnicity	Ref.
1	Mijalko Todorović	4 October 1966	15 March 1969	2 years, 162 days	9th (1969–74)	1913	1938	1999	Serbia	Serb	
2	Stane Dolanc	27 January 1972	15 May 1979	7 years, 108 days	9th–11th (1972–82)	1925	1944	1999	Slovenia	Slovene	
3	Dušan Dragosavac	15 May 1979	25 May 1981	2 years, 10 days	11th (1978–82)	1919	1940	2014	Croatia	Serb	
4	Dobroslav Čulafić	25 May 1981	29 June 1982	1 year, 35 days	11th (1978–82)	1926	1944	2011	Montenegro	Montenegrin	
5	Nikola Stojanović	29 June 1982	26 June 1984	1 year, 363 days	12th (1982–86)	1933	1952	2020	Bosnia-Herzegovina	Serb	
6	Dimče Belovski	26 June 1984	28 June 1986	2 years, 2 days	12th (1982–86)	1923	1943	2010	Macedonia	Macedonian	
7	Radiša Gačić	28 June 1986	30 June 1988	2 years, 2 days	13th (1986–90)	1938	1957	2026	Serbia	Serb	
8	Štefan Korošec	30 June 1988	16 February 1990	1 year, 231 days	13th (1986–90)	1938	1947	2014	Slovenia	Slovene	
9	Petar Škundrić (acting)	16 February 1990	26 May 1990	99 days	13th (1986–90)	1947	1965	Alive	Serbia	Serb	
10	Predrag Jereminov	26 May 1990	22 January 1991	241 days	PROV (1990–91)	1954	?	Alive	Vojvodina	Serb	
