= Miomir Grbović =

Leader of the League of Communists of Yugoslavia in May 1990

Coordinator of the Presidency of the LCY Central Committee
- In office 23 May – 26 May 1990
- Preceded by: Milan Pančevski; (as president)
- Succeeded by: Miroslav Ivanović; (as chairman)

Personal details
- Born: 5 March 1951 (age 75) Pljevlja, Socialist Republic of Montenegro, Socialist Federal Republic of Yugoslavia
- Party: League of Communists of Yugoslavia

Miomir Grbović (born on 5 March 1951) is a Montenegrin politician and former leading figure in the League of Communists of Yugoslavia (LCY). He joined the Montenegrin branch of the LCY in 1973.

== Career ==
Grbović was elected to the 13th term of the LCY's political-executive organ, the presidency, at the 21st Session of the LCY Central Committee (13th term). After the early adjournment of the 14th LCY Congress on 22 January 1990, which was followed by the Slovenian, Croatian and Macedonian branches leaving the LCY, Grbović continued to serve in the LCY Presidency. (Note: At the 10 April 1990 session of the LCY Presidency 13 of 23 members were still active. They were Dušan Čkrebić, Petar Škundrić and Bogdan Trifunović from the Serbian branch, Rrahman Morina from the Kosovo branch, Nedeljko Šipovac from the Vojvodinan branch, Ljubomir Varošlija and Pančevski from the Macedonian branch, Uglješa Uzelac, Ivan Brigić and Nijaz Duraković from the Bosnian branch, Simeon Bunčić from the LCY Organisation in the Yugoslav People's Army, and Momir Bulatović and Grbović from the Montenegrin branch.) He retained his membership until 26 May 1990, when the 14th LCY Congress elected a provisional leadership, known as the Committee for the Preparation of the Congress of Democratic and Programmatic Renewal of the LCY Central Committee. Earlier, on 17 May, the office of president of the LCY Presidency was left vacant when Milan Pančevski's term expired, and Grbović was chosen to serve as acting president of the presidency. The 32nd Session of the Central Committee of the 13th Congress opted to elect Grbović as the coordinator of the LCY Presidency on 23 May, an office he retained until the completion of the 14th Congress on 26 May.

== Bibliography ==
- Kravchenko, Leonid Petrovich (1990). Кто есть кто в мировой политике [Who's Who in World Politics] (in Russian). Publishing House of Political Literature. ISBN 9785250005135.
- Staff writer (May 1990). "New state President–Warning on country's disintegration–Non-communist governments in Slovenia and Croatia". Keesing's Record of World Events. 36 (5). Keesing’s Record of World Events.
- Torov, Ivan (1990). "Pancevski Replaced by Grbovic as LCY Chief". Daily Report: East Europe. Vol. 101–110. Foreign Broadcast Information Service. p. 46.
