= 10th Central Committee =

10th Central Committee may refer to:

- Central Committee of the 10th Congress of the Russian Communist Party (Bolsheviks), 1921–1922
- 10th Central Committee of the Bulgarian Communist Party, 1971–1976
- 10th Central Committee of the Chinese Communist Party, 1973–1977
- 10th Central Committee of the Socialist Unity Party of Germany, 1981–1986
- 10th Central Committee of the Polish United Workers' Party, 1986–1990
- 10th Central Committee of the Romanian Communist Party, 1969–1974
- 10th Central Committee of the Lao People's Revolutionary Party, 2016–2021
- 10th Central Committee of the Communist Party of Vietnam, 2006–2001
- Central Committee of the 10th Congress of the League of Communists of Yugoslavia, 1974–1978
- 10th Central Committee of the Hungarian Socialist Workers' Party, 1970–1975
