= 13th Central Committee =

13th Central Committee may refer to:

- Central Committee of the 13th Congress of the All-Union Communist Party (Bolsheviks), 1924–1925
- 13th Central Committee of the Bulgarian Communist Party, 1986–1990
- 13th Central Committee of the Chinese Communist Party, 1987–1992
- 13th Central Committee of the Romanian Communist Party, 1984–1989
- 13th Central Committee of the Communist Party of Vietnam, 2021–2026
- Central Committee of the 13th Congress of the League of Communists of Yugoslavia, 1986–1990
