= Central Committee of the 10th Congress of the League of Communists of Yugoslavia =

10th Central Committee
- Emblem of the League of Communists of Yugoslavia

30 May 1974 – 20 June 1978 (4 years, 21 days) Overview
- Type: Highest organ
- Election: 10th Congress

Members
- Total: 165 members
- Reelected: 68 members (11th)

This electoral term of the Central Committee was elected by the 10th Congress of the League of Communists of Yugoslavia in 1974, and was in session until the gathering of the 12th Congress in 1978. The preceding electoral term of the LCY Central Committee was elected by the 8th Congress, and served from 1964 to 1969. The 9th Congress had opted to replace the Central Committee with a new organ, the Conference of the League of Communists of Yugoslavia, which existed from 1969 until 1974, when the 10th Congress reestablished the Central Committee.

== Convocations ==
Convocations of the Central Committee of the 10th Congress
Meeting	Date	Length	Type	Ref.
1st Session	30 May 1974	1 day	Ordinary	
2nd Session	25–26 February 1975	2 days	Ordinary	
3rd Session	17 April 1976	1 day	Ordinary	
4th Session	1977	1 day	Ordinary	
5th Session	9 February 1978	1 day	Ordinary	
Informal Session	27 February 1978	1 day	Special	
6th Session	20 March 1978	1 day	Ordinary	

== Composition ==
Members of the Central Committee of the 10th Congress of the League of Communists of Yugoslavia
Name	11th	Birth	PM	Death	Branch	Nationality	Gender	Ref.
Milan Ačić	Not	1924	1943	2018	Yugoslav People's Army	Serb	Male	
Roman Albreht	Not	1921	1945	2006	Slovenia	Slovene	Male	
Dušan Alimpić	Elected	1921	1941	2002	Vojvodina	Serb	Male	
Ljubo Babić	Not	1916	1940	2014	Bosnia-Herzegovina	Serb	Male	
Tomislav Badovinac	Not	1934	1951	Alive	Croatia	Croat	Male	
Rabije Bajrami	Not	1941	1969	?	Kosovo	Albanian	Female	
Mahmut Bakalli	Elected	1936	1957	2006	Kosovo	Albanian	Male	
Vladimir Bakarić	Elected	1912	1933	1983	Croatia	Croat	Male	
Imre Balint	Not	1930	1959	?	Vojvodina	Hungarian	Male	
Milutin Baltić	Not	1920	1940	2013	Croatia	Serb	Male	
Hamid Begovac	Not	1942	1963	?	Bosnia-Herzegovina	Muslim	Male	
Dimče Belovski	Not	1923	1943	2010	Macedonia	Macedonian	Male	
Džemal Bijedić	Died	1917	1939	1977	Bosnia-Herzegovina	Muslim	Male	
Jure Bilić	Not	1922	1941	2006	Croatia	Croat	Male	
Karlo Bilić	Not	1929	1963	?	Croatia	Croat	Male	
Miodrag Bogićević	Not	1932	1951	1994	Bosnia-Herzegovina	Serb	Male	
Nedeljko Bošković	Not	1937	1958	?	Serbia	Serb	Male	
Vojislav Božović	Not	1928	1950	?	Montenegro	Montenegrin	Male	
Marko Bulc	Elected	1926	1944	2019	Slovenia	Slovene	Male	
Miroslav Čangalović	Not	1921	1944	1999	Serbia	Serb	Male	
Angel Čemerski	Elected	1923	1942	2003	Macedonia	Macedonian	Male	
Franjo Čordašić	Elected	1931	1951	?	Croatia	Croat	Male	
Dobroslav Ćulafić	Elected	1926	1944	2011	Montenegro	Montenegrin	Male	
Veli Deva	Elected	1923	1942	2015	Kosovo	Albanian	Male	
Stevan Dimenski	Not	1925	?	?	Macedonia	Macedonian	Male	
Slavka Dimitrijević	Not	1924	1944	?	Serbia	Serb	Female	
Stane Dolanc	Elected	1925	1944	1999	Slovenia	Slovene	Male	
Stevan Doronjski	Elected	1919	1939	1981	Vojvodina	Serb	Male	
Zvone Dragan	Not	1939	1958	Alive	Slovenia	Slovene	Male	
Dragoljub Dragošan	Not	1937	1954	?	Serbia	Serb	Male	
Vaska Duganova	Elected	1922	1942	1996	Macedonia	Macedonian	Female	
Ratomir Dugonjić	Elected	1916	1937	1987	Bosnia-Herzegovina	Serb	Male	
Veselin Đuranović	Elected	1925	1944	1997	Montenegro	Montenegrin	Male	
Radonja Đurović	Not	1925	1945	?	Kosovo	Serb	Male	
Hamdija Fetahović	Not	1923	1948	2016	Montenegro	Montenegrin	Male	
Kiro Gligorov	Elected	1917	1944	2012	Macedonia	Macedonian	Male	
Stanka Glomazić-Leković	Not	1924	1941	2020	Montenegro	Montenegrin	Female	
Josip Gregorić	Not	1928	1945	1995	Yugoslav People's Army	Croat	Male	
Aleksandar Grličkov	Elected	1923	1943	1989	Macedonia	Macedonian	Male	
Zejnulah Gruda	Not	1936	1965	2021	Kosovo	Albanian	Male	
Kiro Hadživasilev	Elected	1921	1943	2000	Macedonia	Macedonian	Male	
Franjo Herljević	Elected	1915	1940	1998	Bosnia-Herzegovina	Croat	Male	
Fadilj Hodža	Elected	1916	1941	2001	Kosovo	Albanian	Male	
Esad Horozić	Not	1929	1948	2019	Bosnia-Herzegovina	Muslim	Male	
Živorad Ivanović	Not	1934	1956	?	Serbia	Serb	Male	
Livij Jakomin	Not	1940	1958	Alive	Slovenia	Slovene	Male	
Predrag Jakonovski	Not	1929	1948	1981	Macedonia	Macedonian	Male	
Trpe Jakovlevski	Elected	1925	1944	2005	Macedonia	Macedonian	Male	
Dragiša Jakovljević	Not	1940	1960	Alive	Montenegro	Montenegrin	Male	
Daut Jašanica	Not	1948	1968	2020	Kosovo	Albanian	Male	
Silva Jereb	Elected	1930	1948	2013	Slovenia	Slovene	Female	
Đoko Jovanić	Not	1917	1936	2000	Croatia	Serb	Male	
Božin Jovanović	Not	1920	1944	2011	Serbia	Serb	Male	
Mirko Jovanović	Died	1923	1941	1977	Yugoslav People's Army	Serb	Male	
Marko Jozić	Not	1928	1958	?	Bosnia-Herzegovina	Croat	Male	
Ante Jurjević	Not	1915	1939	2001	Croatia	Croat	Male	
Danica Jurkovič	Not	1925	1945	?	Slovenia	Slovene	Female	
Slobodan Kalezić	Not	1947	1967	?	Montenegro	Montenegrin	Male	
Hatidža Karabeg	Not	1922	1945	1999	Bosnia-Herzegovina	Muslim	Female	
Kemal Karačić	Not	1934	1957	1990	Bosnia-Herzegovina	Muslim	Male	
Edvard Kardelj	Elected	1910	1928	1979	Slovenia	Slovene	Male	
Medžit Kasumi	Not	1939	1957	?	Kosovo	Albanian	Male	
Ludvik Kejžar	Not	1928	1950	?	Slovenia	Slovene	Male	
Fana Kočovska	Elected	1927	1943	2004	Macedonia	Macedonian	Female	
Rudi Kolak	Elected	1918	1940	2004	Bosnia-Herzegovina	Croat	Male	
Lazar Koliševski	Elected	1914	1935	2000	Macedonia	Macedonian	Male	
Radoje Kontić	Not	1937	1956	Alive	Montenegro	Montenegrin	Male	
Miladin Korać	Elected	1924	1944	2002	Serbia	Muslim	Male	
Hristivoje Kostić	Elected	1943	1968	?	Serbia	Serb	Male	
Nenad Krekić	Elected	1942	1958	2021	Croatia	Serb	Male	
Sead Kreso	Not	1941	1959	2008	Bosnia-Herzegovina	Muslim	Male	
Ljubomir Krišković	Not	1934	1957	?	Croatia	Croat	Male	
Ivan Kukoč	Elected	1918	1935	2005	Croatia	Croat	Male	
Todo Kurtović	Elected	1919	1941	1997	Bosnia-Herzegovina	Serb	Male	
Stanko Lepej	Elected	1942	1961	Alive	Slovenia	Slovene	Male	
Evica Let	Not	1929	1949	?	Croatia	Croat	Female	
Nikola Ljubičić	Elected	1916	1941	2005	Yugoslav People's Army	Serb	Male	
Vladimir Logar	Not	1920	1944	2008	Slovenia	Slovene	Male	
Vujo Lukić	Not	1926	1943	?	Yugoslav People's Army	Serb	Male	
Ismailj Maljići	Not	1943	1965	?	Yugoslav People's Army	Albanian	Male	
Dragutin Marković	Elected	1926	1948	?	Serbia	Serb	Male	
Moma Marković	Not	1912	1933	1992	Serbia	Serb	Male	
Krste Markovski	Not	1925	1941	?	Macedonia	Macedonian	Male	
Panče Martinovski	Not	1931	1948	?	Macedonia	Macedonian	Male	
Munir Mesihović	Elected	1928	1946	2016	Bosnia-Herzegovina	Muslim	Male	
Filip Mihailović	Not	1939	1956	?	Serbia	Serb	Male	
Cvijetin Mijatović	Elected	1913	1933	1993	Bosnia-Herzegovina	Serb	Male	
Branko Mikulić	Elected	1928	1945	1994	Bosnia-Herzegovina	Croat	Male	
Veljko Milatović	Not	1921	1940	2004	Montenegro	Montenegrin	Male	
Slobodan Milevski	Not	1938	1958	?	Macedonia	Macedonian	Male	
Nikola Milićević	Not	1930	1950	2016	Serbia	Serb	Male	
Milutin Milošević	Not	1929	1948	?	Serbia	Serb	Male	
Miloš Minić	Elected	1914	1936	2003	Serbia	Serb	Male	
Todor Mohan	Not	1926	1959	?	Vojvodina	Romanian	Male	
Lazar Mojsov	Elected	1920	1940	2011	Macedonia	Macedonian	Male	
Vukašin Mrvaljević	Not	1938	1959	?	Montenegro	Montenegrin	Male	
Kosta Nađ	Elected	1911	1937	1986	Vojvodina	Hungarian	Male	
Milivoj Oreb	Not	1925	1943	?	Yugoslav People's Army	Croat	Male	
Branko Pavićević	Not	1922	1942	2012	Montenegro	Montenegrin	Male	
Karolj Peho	Not	1935	1959	?	Vojvodina	Hungarian	Male	
Ilija Perišić	Not	1926	1944	2010	Yugoslav People's Army	Serb	Male	
Kalman Petković	Not	1930	1948	?	Vojvodina	Hungarian	Male	
Dane Petkovski	Not	1922	1943	2005	Yugoslav People's Army	Macedonian	Male	
Dušan Petrović	Died	1914	1936	1977	Serbia	Serb	Male	
Milka Planinc	Elected	1924	1944	2010	Croatia	Croat	Female	
Mirjana Poček-Matić	Elected	1932	1959	2005	Croatia	Montenegrin	Female	
Stanko Ponoćko	Not	1939	1957	?	Vojvodina	Serb	Male	
Mavro Popijač	Not	1926	1951	2016	Croatia	Croat	Male	
France Popit	Elected	1921	1940	2013	Slovenia	Slovene	Male	
Krsto Popivoda	Not	1910	1933	1988	Montenegro	Montenegrin	Male	
Dušan Popović	Elected	1921	1944	2014	Vojvodina	Serb	Male	
Mirko Popović	Elected	1923	1941	1986	Serbia	Serb	Male	
Stane Potočar	Elected	1919	1942	1997	Yugoslav People's Army	Slovene	Male	
Hakija Pozderac	Not	1919	1943	1994	Bosnia-Herzegovina	Muslim	Male	
Biserka Prlja-Kecojević	Not	1940	1958	?	Montenegro	Montenegrin	Female	
Ivo Purišić	Died	1920	1942	1976	Yugoslav People's Army	Croat	Male	
Đorđe Radosavljević	Not	1921	1933	?	Vojvodina	Serb	Male	
Vojo Rajčević	Not	1934	1950	?	Montenegro	Montenegrin	Male	
Milan Rakas	Not	1931	1948	?	Croatia	Serb	Male	
Hisen Ramadani	Elected	1933	1954	2012	Macedonia	Albanian	Male	
Miha Ravnik	Elected	1938	1957	2021	Slovenia	Slovene	Male	
Dušan Ristić	Not	1928	1947	?	Kosovo	Serb	Male	
Sadik Sadiku	Not	1930	1957	?	Macedonia	Albanian	Male	
Sinan Sahiti	Not	1934	1950	?	Kosovo	Albanian	Male	
Slavko Šajber	Elected	1929	1948	2003	Croatia	Croat	Male	
Džemil Šarac	Elected	1921	1941	2002	Yugoslav People's Army	Muslim	Male	
Sava Savatić	Elected	1933	1952	?	Serbia	Serb	Male	
Radivoje Šćekić	Not	1931	1950	?	Montenegro	Montenegrin	Male	
Ivan Siljanovski	Not	1941	1968	?	Macedonia	Macedonian	Male	
Boško Šiljegović	Elected	1915	1940	1990	Bosnia-Herzegovina	Serb	Male	
Melita Singer	Not	1924	1945	2016	Croatia	Croat	Male	
Vera Škofič	Not	1924	1946	1984	Slovenia	Slovene	Female	
Jože Smole	Elected	1927	1943	1996	Slovenia	Slovene	Male	
Mika Špiljak	Elected	1916	1938	2007	Croatia	Croat	Male	
Vojislav Srzentić	Elected	1934	1952	Alive	Montenegro	Montenegrin	Male	
Petar Stambolić	Elected	1912	1935	2007	Serbia	Serb	Male	
Milenko Stanić	Not	1931	1949	?	Vojvodina	Serb	Male	
Milanka Stanković	Not	1943	1965	?	Serbia	Serb	Female	
Dragoljub Stavrev	Elected	1932	1950	2003	Macedonia	Macedonian	Male	
Janez Sterniša	Not	1933	1963	2006	Slovenia	Slovene	Male	
Ali Šukrija	Elected	1919	1939	2005	Kosovo	Albanian	Male	
Franc Tavčar	Elected	1920	1941	2002	Yugoslav People's Army	Slovene	Male	
Josip Broz Tito	Elected	1892	1920	1980	Not made public	Croat	Male	
Stanko Tomić	Not	1926	1943	?	Bosnia-Herzegovina	Serb	Male	
Vida Tomšič	Elected	1913	1934	1998	Slovenia	Slovene	Female	
Jan Turan	Not	1942	1960	?	Vojvodina	Slovak	Male	
Franjo Varga	Elected	1925	1945	?	Croatia	Croat	Male	
Jovan Veselinov	Not	1906	1922	1982	Vojvodina	Serb	Male	
Mirko Vidaković	Elected	1924	1962	2002	Vojvodina	Croat	Male	
Dobrivoje Vidić	Elected	1918	1939	1992	Serbia	Serb	Male	
Veljko Vlahović	Died	1914	1935	1975	Montenegro	Montenegrin	Male	
Tihomir Vlaškalić	Elected	1923	1945	1993	Serbia	Serb	Male	
Radovan Vojvodić	Elected	1922	1940	2000	Yugoslav People's Army	Montenegrin	Male	
Ivanka Vrhovčak	Not	1933	1954	?	Slovenia	Slovene	Female	
Josip Vrhovec	Elected	1926	1944	2006	Croatia	Croat	Male	
Bogić Vučinić	Not	1932	1951	?	Montenegro	Montenegrin	Male	
Jovan Vujadinović	Elected	1921	1943	?	Montenegro	Montenegrin	Male	
Ljubomir Vujošević	Not	1934	1952	?	Montenegro	Montenegrin	Male	
Dušan Vukotić	Not	1927	1957	1998	Croatia	Croat	Male	
Iztok Winkler	Elected	1939	1959	2013	Slovenia	Slovene	Male	
Vidoje Žarković	Elected	1927	1943	2000	Montenegro	Montenegrin	Male	
Šemsudin Zejnilagić	Not	1932	1949	1991	Bosnia-Herzegovina	Muslim	Male	
Boris Ziherl	Died	1910	1930	1976	Slovenia	Slovene	Male	
Borivoje Zivgarević	Not	1927	1946	?	Kosovo	Serb	Male	
Redžep Zogaj	Not	1935	1952	2010	Kosovo	Albanian	Male	
Marija Zvekić-Miškolci	Not	1934	1951	?	Vojvodina	Hungarian	Female	

== Bibliography ==
- Djokić, Dejan (2023). A Concise History of Serbia. Cambridge University Press. ISBN 978-1-107-02838-8.
- Hazan, Baruch (1985). The East European Political System: Instruments of Power. Westview Press. ISBN 0-8133-7064-7.
- Hetemi, Atdhe (2020). Student Movements for the Republic of Kosovo: 1968, 1981 and 1997. Springer International Publishing. ISBN 978-3-030-54951-0.
- Lewytzkyj, Borys; Stroynowski, Juliusz, eds. (1978). Who's Who in the Socialist Countries. K. G. Saur Verlag. ISBN 3-7940-3017-6.
- Rajović, Radošin (1970). Jugoslovenski savremenici: Ko je ko u Jugoslaviji [Yugoslav Contemporaries: Who's Who in Yugoslavia] (in Serbo-Croatian). Hronometar.
- Stanković, Slobodan (1975). Staar, Richard F. (ed.). Yearbook on International Communist Affairs 1975. Yearbook on International Communist Affairs. Hoover Institution Press.
- Stanković, Slobodan (1976). Staar, Richard F. (ed.). Yearbook on International Communist Affairs 1976. Yearbook on International Communist Affairs. Hoover Institution Press.
- Stanković, Slobodan (1977). Staar, Richard F. (ed.). Yearbook on International Communist Affairs 1977. Yearbook on International Communist Affairs. Hoover Institution Press.
- Stroynowski, Juliusz, ed. (1989a). Who's Who in the Socialist Countries of Europe: A–H. K. G. Saur Verlag. ISBN 3-598-10719-6.
- Stroynowski, Juliusz, ed. (1989b). Who's Who in the Socialist Countries of Europe: I–O. K. G. Saur Verlag. ISBN 3-598-10719-6.
- Stroynowski, Juliusz, ed. (1989c). Who's Who in the Socialist Countries of Europe: P–Z. K. G. Saur Verlag. ISBN 3-598-10719-6.
