= Colette M. Jenkins =

American journalist

Colette M. Jenkins was an American journalist. She was an award-winning religion/ethics writer at the Akron Beacon Journal. While working for the Akron Beacon Journal in 1993, Jenkins was one of several reporters who worked on a project studying race relations in Northeastern Ohio. The series, entitled "A Question of Color," won the 1994 Pulitzer Prize for Public Service.

Mrs. Colette Marie Jenkins Parker, 60, died on Saturday, Nov. 28, 2020, following a short illness. She started as a staff writer at the Warren Tribune. After starting her career in Warren, Ohio, she transitioned to religion/ethics writer at the Akron Beacon Journal for 25 years, from April 1992 to November 2016. Colette continued a journey of faith and was a current member of St. Elizabeth Ann Seton Church in Warren. She served as a Dominican Associate and was the current Director of Associates for the Dominican Sisters of Peace in Akron from December 2016 until her death. She was a 1989 graduate of Indiana University-Bloomington. In addition to her parents, she was preceded in death by brothers, Henry Jr., Willie Charles and Carl Jenkins; and sister, Grace Broadway.

Jenkins was a wife and mother. Her surviving family at the time of her death included: Darryl Parker; daughter, Angelica Parker, both of Ohio; sister, Valerie L. Jenkins; and brother, Tommy Floyd Jenkins of South Bend, Ind. [5]
