= Committee for the Preparation of the Democratic and Programmatic Renewal =

Collective Provisional Leadership Body in Yugoslavia

The Committee for the Preparation of the Congress of Democratic and Programmatic Renewal of the Central Committee of the League of Communists of Yugoslavia (LCY) (Note: Serbo-Croatian: Odbor za pripremu kongresa demokratske i programske obnove Centralnog komiteta Saveza komunista Jugoslavije (CK SKJ)) was elected on 26 May 1990, the last day of the 14th Congress, with Montenegrin Miroslav Ivanović as its chairman. The committee was tasked with convening the 15th LCY Congress on 29 September 1990 and renewing the organisation. It also acted like a provisional leadership that took over some of the powers of the Presidency and the Central Committee, whose composition was not reelected at the 14th Congress. It worked on creating a new statute and programme for the reformed organisation. A committee working group was established to propose a new name for the LCY. It eventually landed on the "Yugoslav Socialist Party" (YSP), wrote a draft programme, and created an electoral symbol to participate in national elections. According to Serb Predrag Jereminov, the committee's secretary, the party would base its program on the following principles: "Democratic socialism, federalism, national equality, a market, and a rule of law and welfare state". The proposed draft programme stated the YSP originated from the LCY, but that it was a new party since, according to Jereminov, "the League of Communists of Yugoslavia is definitively going into history."

Despite the committee's work, the LCY was faltering. In February, the League of Communists of Slovenia (LC Slovenia) officially left the LCY, while the League of Communists of Croatia (LC Croatia) refused to support work to continue the LCY and the League of Communists of Macedonia (LC of Macedonia) moving to a similar position after the Slovene and Croatian abandonment of the party. At its 12th Extraordinary Congress on 16–17 July, the League of Communists of Serbia (LC Serbia) declared that the LCY "no longer exists" and stopped supporting the committee's work. In August, the committee informed the public that the proposed congress could not be organised since no representatives from the LCs of Croatia, Montenegro, Serbia, and Slovenia were willing to partake in its activities. To continue financing its work, the committee began leasing eight floors of the Ušće Tower that same month. This was followed by the dissolution of the party organisation in the Yugoslav People's Army and the establishment of the League of Communists – Movement for Yugoslavia (LC–MY) on 19 November 1990. Later, on 22 January 1991, the committee dissolved itself—the last federal organ of the LCY—and transferred all its funds and property to the LC–MY. The League of Communists of Bosnia and Herzegovina was the last republican organisation that broke with the LCY, doing so officially only on 24 February 1991.

== Known convocations ==
Meetings of the Central Committee of the 11th Congress
Meeting	Date	Length	Type	Ref.
1st Session	27 May 1990	1 day	Ordinary	
2nd Session	31 May 1990	1 day	Ordinary	
? Session	22 January 1991	1 day	Ordinary	

== Composition ==
Members of the Committee for the Preparation of the Democratic and Programmatic Renewal of the League of Communists of Yugoslavia
Name	Birth	PM	Death	Branch	Nationality	Gender	Ref.
Ivan Brigić	1936	1957	2015	Bosnia-Herzegovina	Croat	Male	
Momir Bulatović	1956	?	2019	Montenegro	Montenegrin	Male	
Simeon Bunčić	1928	1943	?	Yugoslav People's Army	Serb	Male	
Nijaz Duraković	1949	1967	2012	Bosnia-Herzegovina	Muslim	Male	
Božidar Grubišić	1932	1951	2021	Yugoslav People's Army	Croat	Male	
Miroslav Ivanović	1955	?	?	Montenegro	Montenegrin	Male	
Predrag Jereminov	1954	?	?	Vojvodina	Serb	Male	
Rahman Morina	1943	1969	1990	Kosovo	Albanian	Male	
Nedeljko Šipovac	1942	1960	2025	Vojvodina	Serb	Male	
Petar Skundrić	1947	1965	Alive	Serbia	Serb	Male	
Radoš Smiljković	1934	1950	Alive	Serbia	Serb	Male	
Dževad Tašić	?	?	?	Bosnia-Herzegovina	Muslim	Male	
Bogdan Trifunović	1933	1950	2007	Serbia	Serb	Male	
Miodrag Vuković	1955	1972	2022	Montenegro	Montenegrin	Male	
Jagoš Zelenović	1944	?	?	Kosovo	Serb	Male	

== Bibliography ==
- Djukanović, Bojka (2023). Historical Dictionary of Montenegro. Rowman & Littlefield Publishers. ISBN 978-1-5381-3915-8.
- Elsie, Robert (2011). Historical Dictionary of Kosovo. Scarecrow Press. ISBN 978-0-8108-7483-1.
- Morrison, Kenneth (2018). Nationalism, Identity and Statehood in Post-Yugoslav Montenegro. Bloomsbury Publishing. ISBN 978-1-4742-3520-4.
- Klemenčič, Matjaž; Zagar, Mitja (2004). The Former Yugoslavia's Diverse Peoples: A Reference Sourcebook. Bloomsbury Publishing. ISBN 9781851095476.
- Rajović, Radošin (1970). Jugoslovenski savremenici: Ko je ko u Jugoslaviji [Yugoslav Contemporaries: Who's Who in Yugoslavia] (in Serbo-Croatian). Hronometar.
- Remington, Robert Alison (1991). "Yugoslav Soldiers in Politics: On the Road to Civil War". Occasional Papers. University of Missouri–St. Louis.
- Sasso, Alfredo (2017). "Observation, not resolution'. The final congresses of the Bosnian communists (1989-1990)". In Kamberović, H (ed.). Bosna i Hercegovina u socijalističkoj Jugoslaviji: od Ustava 1946. do Deklaracije o nezavisnosti 1991. godine. Institut za Istoriju – UHMIS. ISBN 992680828X.
- Staff writer (1990a). "Committee for Preparing Renewal Congress Meets". Daily Report: East Europe. Vol. 101–110. Foreign Broadcast Information Service. p. 75.
- Staff writer (1990b). "LCY Expected To Become New Socialist Party". Daily Report: East Europe. Vol. 171–180. Foreign Broadcast Information Service. p. 74.
- Staff writer (1990c). "Renewal Chairman Seeks 'Unity in Diversity'". Daily Report: East Europe. Vol. 101–110. Foreign Broadcast Information Service. p. 75.
- Staff writer (1990d). "LCY Congress Preparation Committee Named". Daily Report: East Europe. Vol. 101–110. Foreign Broadcast Information Service. p. 59.
- Stroynowski, Juliusz, ed. (1989a). Who's Who in the Socialist Countries of Europe: A–H. K. G. Saur Verlag. ISBN 3-598-10719-6.
- Vostrukhov, Ye. (1990). "Communist Parties: Split not Overcome—Results of the 14th LCY Congress". The Current Digest of the Soviet Press. Vol. 1–25. Association for Slavic, East European, and Eurasian Studies. p. 75.
