= Petar Škundrić =

Serbian politician

Petar Škundrić MSc PhD
- Петар Шкундрић
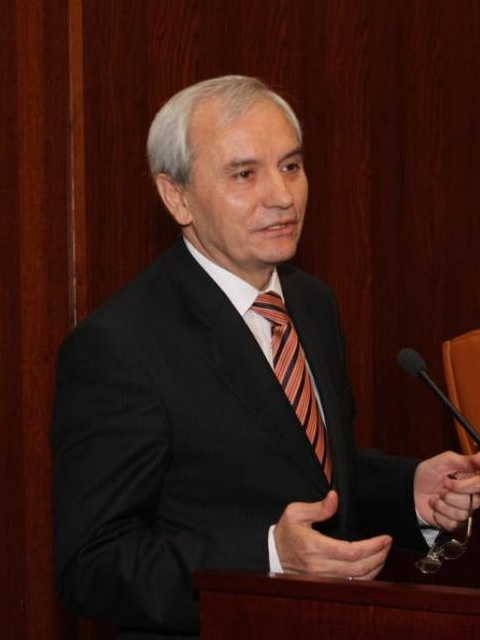
- Škundrić in 2009

Minister of Energy and Mining
- In office 7 July 2008 – 14 March 2011
- Preceded by: Aleksandar Popović
- Succeeded by: Milutin Mrkonjić (Energy); Oliver Dulić (Mining)

Secretary-General of the Socialist Party of Serbia
- In office 18 July 1990 – 24 October 1992
- President: Slobodan Milošević
- Preceded by: Milomir Minić
- Succeeded by: Milomir Minić

Secretary of the Presidency of the League of Communists of Yugoslavia
- In office 16 February 1990 – 26 May 1990
- President: Miomir Grbović; Milan Pančevski
- Preceded by: Štefan Korošec
- Succeeded by: Predrag Jereminov

Personal details
- Born: 21 February 1947 (age 79) Gračac, PR Croatia, FPR Yugoslavia
- Party: Socialist Party of Serbia (1990–2020); League of Communists of Serbia (until 1990)

Petar Škundrić (Serbian Cyrillic: Петар Шкундрић; born 21 February 1947) is a Serbian politician. He was a member of the Socialist Party of Serbia who served as the Minister of Energy and Mining from 2008 to 2011.

== Education and career ==
Škundrić graduated and obtained his masters and PhD degrees at the Faculty of Technology and Metallurgy of the University of Belgrade.

He is professor at the Faculty of Technology and Metallurgy in Belgrade, and honorary professor at the Saint Petersburg State Institute of Technology.

He is one of the founding members and first secretary general of the Socialist Party of Serbia, and was a member of parliament of the former state union of Serbia and Montenegro. Presently he is a member of the board of SPS.

On 7 July 2008 he was elected Minister of Energy and Mining in the Government of Serbia, a post he held until March 2011, when the portfolio was split into the Infrastructure and Environment ministries.

He was kicked out from the Socialist Party of Serbia after his son arrested at an anti-government protest in July 2019. President of Serbia, Aleksandar Vučić called him a tycoon.

Škundrić is married and father of two sons.

Government offices
Preceded by Aleksandar Popović	Minister of Energy and Mining; 2008–2011	Succeeded by Milutin Mrkonjić (Energy); Oliver Dulić (Mining)
Sporting positions
Preceded by Aleksandar Vlahović	President of SD Crvena Zvezda; 2010–present	Incumbent
