= Petar Šimić =

Admiral of the Yugoslav Navy

- Born: 1932; Bihać, Vrbas Banovina, Kingdom of Yugoslavia (modern day Bosnia and Herzegovina)
- Died: 11 April 1990 (aged 57) Belgrade, SR Serbia, SFR Yugoslavia (modern day Serbia)
- Allegiance: SFR Yugoslavia
- Branch: Yugoslav People's Army: Yugoslav Navy
- Service years: ?–1990
- Rank: Admiral

Petar Šimić (1932 – 11 April 1990) was an admiral of the Yugoslav Navy, Commander of the Split Military Area and Assistant Commander of the Military Naval Area for political-legal sector.

== Early life ==
Šimić's family hailed from the village of Drivenik near Novi Vinodolski.

== Role in SKJ ==
Before his death, Šimić served as the President of the League of Communists Organisation in the Yugoslav People's Army, thereby acting as head of the League of Communists of Yugoslavia (SKJ) in the Yugoslav People's Army (JNA). In the late 1980s, he represented hardliners within JNA in public appearances. On 31 January 1989, he issued an announcement in which he accused some politicians of "pushing the Yugoslav ship on the rocks". Although he didn't name them at the time, it was clear that the announcement was directed at Croat and Slovene politicians, especially at Stipe Šuvar, the leader of the League of Communists of Yugoslavia at the time. Šimić also added that "JNA will oppose, with all its might, anybody who wants to play dangerous games with achievements of our struggle and the socialist revolution".

At one of the sessions where fierce discussions occurred, according to official version, he suffered a stroke and died.

After the Yugoslav Wars had ended, Croatian journalist Franjo Deranja published a book, sourced mainly to Antun Tus, saying that it was probable that the Yugoslav People's Army leadership was at fault for Šimić's death.

== Sources ==
- Franjo Deranja: Slučaj admirala Petra Šimića – Strogo povjerljivo (Glosa d.o.o., Rijeka, 2015.; 60 stranica, tvrdi uvez)
- Radaljac, Danko (9 April 2015). "'Strogo povjerljivo': Petra Šimića, »kočničara« rata, smaknuli jastrebovi JNA" ['Strictly confidential': Petar Šimić, who was an obstacle to war, was executed by the JNA hawks]. Novi list (in Croatian).
