= Conference of the League of Communists of Yugoslavia =

The conference of the League of Communists of Yugoslavia (LCY) refers to three different institutions: the Territorial Conference that convened prior to the LCY seizing power, the annual Conference of the LCY which replaced the LCY Central Committee in the period 1969 to 1974, and the national party conference which could be convened either by a decision of the LCY Central Committee or on the suggestions of the LCY branches.

The 9th LCY Congress, held on 11–15 March 1969, abolished the LCY Central Committee and delegated most of its powers to the new LCY Presidency and the new body, the "Conference of the League of Communists of Yugoslavia". Unlike the previous institution known by that name, until 1969, this body was to meet annually, which it failed to do. According to scholar Helen Hardman, "the conference appears to have been designed for the purpose of crisis management." The conferences were convened to discuss rising nationalism in the republics, economic difficulties, and failure of implementation on agreed policies. Regarding the implementation of policy, Tito told the 3rd Conference, held on 6–8 December 1972, "I would not like this resolution to suffer the same fate as the resolution of the Ninth Congress and of the First and Second LCY Conferences, to which many people did not pay any attention, nor did they respect them." This failure was felt in other bodies as well, and the Executive Bureau also failed to reconcile competing republican interests. As such, the 10th Congress, held on 27–30 May 1974, abolished the conference and reestablished the LCY Central Committee. A new institution, also named "Conference of the League of Communists of Yugoslavia", was established by the 12th Congress, held on 26–29 June 1982. This institution shared several characteristics with the pre-1969 conference and with communist party conference institutions of other ruling communist parties.

The last incarnation of the LCY Conference was convened once, on 29–31 May 1988, as the "Conference of the League of Communists of Yugoslavia for Consolidating the Political Ideology of the Party's Leading Role and for the Unity and Accountability of the LCY in its Struggle to Get Out of the Socio-Economic Crisis". This institution was to be convened between two party congresses on the orders of the LCY Central Committee. The LCY Central Committee had the sole right to convene the conference. The LCY Presidency, a republican branch central committee and the provincial committee of an autonomous province had the right to propose the convocation of a party conference to the LCY Central Committee, which it could either accept or reject. The 13th Congress, held on 25–28 June 1986, amended the party statute to state that the conference was to "seek the input of the membership, the primary party organisations and other organs of the LCY in reviewing and deciding the position and policy of the LCY on significant ideological-political, socio-economic and other issues between two congresses, the CC of the LCY may convene as necessary, but only once during a term of office, the conference of the LCY." The 13th Congress also clarified that the LCY Central Committee, and not its branches, was responsible for organising the election of delegates to the conference.

== Conferences ==
=== Territorial Conferences (1922–1940) ===
Convocations of the Territorial Conference of CPY
Meeting	Date	Length	Delegates	Location	Ref.
1st Convocation	3–17 July 1922	15 days	22	Vienna, Austria	
2nd Convocation	9–12 May 1923	4 days	?	Vienna, Austria	
3rd Convocation	1–4 January 1924	4 days	35	Belgrade, Yugoslavia	
4th Convocation	24–25 December 1934	13 days	25	Ljubljana, Yugoslavia	
5th Convocation	19–23 October 1940	6 days	105	Dubrava, Yugoslavia	

=== Conferences of the 9th Congress (1969–1974) ===
Convocations of the Conference of the LCY
Meeting	Date	Length	Delegates	Location	Ref.
1st Convocation	29–31 October 1970	3 days	280	Beograd, Yugoslavia	
2nd Convocation	25–27 January 1972	3 days	367	Beograd, Yugoslavia	
3rd Convocation	6–8 December 1972	3 days	367	Beograd, Yugoslavia	
4th Convocation	10–11 May 1973	2 days	345	Beograd, Yugoslavia	

=== Conference (1974–1990) ===
Convocations of the Conference of the LCY
Meeting	Date	Length	Delegates	Location	Ref.
1st Convocation	29–31 May 1988	3 days	784	Beograd, Yugoslavia	

== Bibliography ==
- Andrejevich, Milan (2019). Mastny, Vojtech (ed.). Soviet/East European Survey, 1987-1988: Selected Research And Analysis From Radio Free Europe/radio Liberty. Taylor & Francis. ISBN 9780856260117.
- Pirjevec, Jože (2018). Tito and His Comrades. University of Wisconsin Press. ISBN 9780299317706.
- Pleterski, Janko; Kecić, Danilo; Vasić, Miroljub; Damjanović, Pero; Trgo, Fabijan [in Slovenian]; Morača, Pero; Petranović, Branko; Bilandžić, Dušan; Stojanović, Stanislav (1985). Povijest Saveza komunista Jugoslavije [History of the League of Communists of Yugoslavia] (in Serbo-Croatian). Izdavački Centar Komunist / Narodna Knjiga / Rad.
- Hardman, Helen (2012). Gorbachev's Export of Perestroika to Eastern Europe: Democratisation Reconsidered. Manchester University Press. ISBN 978-0-7190-7978-8.
- Johnson, A. Ross (1983). Political Leadership in Yugoslavia: Evolution of the League of Communists (PDF). United States Department of State. Archived (PDF) from the original on 2 June 2023.
- Simons, Williams B.; White, Stephen, eds. (1984). "The Statute of the League of Communists of Yugoslavia". The Party Statutes of the Communist World. Law in Eastern Europe. Martinus Nijhoff Publishers. pp. 485–533. ISBN 90-247-2975-0.
- Stanković, Slobodan (3 November 1970). Analysis of the Yugoslav First Party Conference (Report). Budapest: Records of Radio Free Europe/Radio Liberty Research Institute. HU OSA 300-8-3-10520.
- Stanković, Slobodan (26 January 1972a). Second Conference of the Yugoslav Party: First Day (Report). Budapest: Records of Radio Free Europe/Radio Liberty Research Institute. HU OSA 300-8-3-10701.
- Stanković, Slobodan (5 December 1972b). Yugoslav Party Conference to Discuss Youth Problems (Report). Budapest: Records of Radio Free Europe/Radio Liberty Research Institute. HU OSA 300-8-3-10771.
- Stanković, Slobodan (14 March 1973). After Yugoslav Fourth Party Conference (Report). Budapest: Records of Radio Free Europe/Radio Liberty Research Institute. HU OSA 300-8-3-10905.
- Vinterhalter, Vilko (1972). In the Path of Tito. Abacus Press. ISBN 9780856260117.
