= Milan Pančevski =

Last General Secretary of Yugoslavia

President of the Presidency of the Central Committee of the League of Communists of Yugoslavia
- In office 17 May 1989 – 17 May 1990
- Preceded by: Stipe Šuvar
- Succeeded by: Miomir Grbović (as coordinator)

Personal details
- Born: 16 May 1935 Debar, Kingdom of Yugoslavia
- Died: 9 January 2019 (aged 83) Skopje, Macedonia
- Party: League of Communists of Yugoslavia

Milan Pančevski (Macedonian: Милан Панчевски; 16 May 1935 – 9 January 2019) was a Macedonian politician who was the final President of the League of Communists of Yugoslavia from 1989 to 1990, when the party was dissolved. He was also part of the Presidency in 1987.

== Early life ==
Prior to being President of the League of Communists of Yugoslavia, he was President of the League of Communists of Macedonia from 1984 to 1986. He was active in politics after the Breakup of Yugoslavia, and joined the Social Democratic Union of Macedonia.

He died in Skopje on 9 January 2019.
