= League of Communists Organisation in the Yugoslav People's Army =

League of Communists Organisation in the Yugoslav People's Army Organizacija Saveza komunista u Jugoslovenskoj narodnoj armiji
- Logo of the LCY-YPA
- Founded: 1969
- Dissolved: 4 November 1990
- Succeeded by: League of Communists – Movement for Yugoslavia
- Headquarters: Belgrade, SR Serbia, SFR Yugoslavia
- Ideology: Communism; Marxism–Leninism; Titoism
- Political position: Left-wing to far-left
- Colours: Red

The League of Communists Organisation in the Yugoslav People's Army (LCY–YPA) (Note: Serbo-Croatian: Организација Савеза комуниста у Југословенској народној армији, Organizacija Saveza komunista u Jugoslovenskoj narodnoj armiji, Macedonian: Организација Сојузот на комунистите во ЈНА, Slovene: Organizacija Zveze komunistov v JLA) was the branch of the League of Communists of Yugoslavia (SKJ) for members of the Yugoslav People's Army.

== Description ==
The LCY–YPA generally constituted a centralist and leftist grouping within party organizations. At the LCY–YPA's final 9th Conference in Belgrade in November 1989, the head of the organization's committee Admiral Petar Šimić spoke out against new parties, multi-party democracy, sectarianism and separatism.

After the dissolution of the League of Communists of Yugoslavia in January 1990, the LCY–YPA was reformed as the League of Communists – Movement for Yugoslavia in November 1990.

== See also ==
- Yugoslav People's Army
- League of Communists of Yugoslavia
- Socialist Federal Republic of Yugoslavia

== Bibliography ==
- Cohen, Lenard J.; Dragović-Soso, Jasna (2008). State Collapse in South-Eastern Europe: New Perspectives on Yugoslavia's Disintegration. Purdue University Press. ISBN 978-1-55753-460-6.
- Pauković, Davor (2008). "Posljednji kongres Saveza komunista Jugoslavije: uzroci, tijek i posljedice raspada". Suvremene Teme. 1 (1): 21–33.
