= Central Committee of the 4th Congress of the Communist Party of Yugoslavia =

This electoral term of the Central Committee was elected by the 4th Congress of the Communist Party of Yugoslavia (CPY) in 1928, and was in session until the convocation of the 5th Congress in 1948. Mid-term elections were organised by the 4th Conference in 1934 and the 5th Conference in 1940. A Temporary Leadership was established in 1938; it received the approval of the Communist International in 1939, in the aftermath of the purge of the CPY, which killed several leading Central Committee members.

== Composition ==
=== 4th Congress: 1928–1934 ===
Members of the Central Committee of the 4th Congress of the Communist Party of Yugoslavia
Name	3rd CC	4th CO	Birth	PM	Death	Nationality	Gender	Ref.
Đuro Đaković	Old	Shot	1886	1919	1929	Croat	Male	
Josip Debeljak	New	Shot	1902	1923	1931	Croat	Male	
Filip Filipović	Old	Not	1878	1919	1938	Serb	Male	
Milan Gorkić	New	Elected	1904	1919	1937	Czech	Male	
Jovan Mališić	New	Not	1902	1919	1939	Montenegrin	Male	
Marko Mašanović	New	Shot	1894	1919	1930	Montenegrin	Male	
Žika Pecarski	New	Not	1894	1919	?	Serb	Male	
Ljuba Radovanović	New	Not	1887	1919	1964	Serb	Male	
Petar Radovanović	New	Not	1882	1919	1945	Serb	Male	
Đuro Salaj	Old	Not	1889	1919	1958	Croat	Male	
Lazar Stefanović	Old	Not	1885	1919	1950	Serb	Male	
Božo Vidas - Vuk	New	Shot	1894	1919	1931	Croat	Male	
Gojko Vuković	New	Died	1887	1919	1934	Serb	Male	
Jakob Žorga	Old	Not	1888	1919	1942	Slovene	Male	

=== 4th Conference: 1934–1938 ===
==== Members ====
Members of the Central Committee of the 4th Conference of the Communist Party of Yugoslavia
Name	4th CC	4th TL	Birth	PM	Death	Nationality	Gender	Ref.
Vladimir Ćopić	New	Arrested	1891	1919	1939	Serb	Male	
Milan Gorkić	Old	Arrested	1904	1919	1937	Czech	Male	
Ivan Gržetić	New	Arrested	1896	1920	1937	Croat	Male	
Karlo Hudomalj	New	Expelled	1905	1927	1945	Slovene	Male	
Kamilo Horvatin	New	Arrested	1896	1919	1938	Croat	Male	
Vicko Jelaska	New	Not	1887	1919	1968	Croat	Male	
Franjo Kralj	New	Not	1901	1919	1941	Slovene	Male	
Franc Leskošek	New	Elected	1897	1926	1983	Slovene	Male	
Miha Marinko	New	Elected	1900	1923	1983	Slovene	Male	
Adolf Muk	New	Not	1893	1919	1943	Montenegrin	Male	
Blagoje Parović	New	War	1903	1923	1937	Serb	Male	
Josip Broz Tito	New	Elected	1892	1920	1980	Croat	Male	

==== Candidates ====
Candidates of the Central Committee of the 4th Conference of the Communist Party of Yugoslavia
Name	4th CC	4th TL	Birth	PM	Death	Branch	Nationality	Gender	Ref.
Josip Kraš	New	Elected	1900	1928	1941	Croat	Male		

Note: Rodoljub Čolaković (1900-1983) was member of CC of CPY from 1936 to 1938, also of Politburo.

=== Temporary Leadership: 1938–1940 ===
Members of the Central Committee of the 4th Conference of the Communist Party of Yugoslavia
Name	4th CO	5th CO	Birth	PM	Death	Nationality	Gender	Ref.
Milovan Đilas	New	Elected	1911	1933	1995	Montenegrin	Male	
Edvard Kardelj	New	Elected	1910	1928	1979	Slovene	Male	
Josip Kraš	Candidate	Candidate	1900	1928	1941	Croat	Male	
Franc Leskošek	Old	Elected	1897	1926	1983	Slovene	Male	
Miha Marinko	Old	Elected	1900	1923	1983	Slovene	Male	
Aleksandar Ranković	New	Elected	1909	1928	1983	Serb	Male	
Josip Broz Tito	Old	Elected	1892	1920	1980	Croat	Male	
Andrija Žaja	New	Not	1901	1919	1941	Croat	Male	

Note: Đuro Špoljarić (1906–1991) was elected secretary of CC of Communist party of Croatia on its first congress in 1937 (till 1939, when he was replaced)

=== 5th Conference: 1940–1948 ===
==== Members ====
Note: later coopted in CC also: Blagoje Nešković, Andrija Hebrang, Vladimir Bakarić, Rodoljub Čolaković, Ivan Gošnjak, Đuro Salaj, Jovan Veselinov, Osman Karabegović, Lazar Koliševski, Moma Markovič, Ivan Maček etc., including 4 candidates, mentioned below)

Members of the Central Committee of the 5th Conference of the Communist Party of Yugoslavia
Name	4th TL	5th CC	Birth	PM	Death	Nationality	Gender	Ref.
Spasenija Babović	New	Elected	1907	1928	1977	Serb	Female	
Jakov Blažević	New	Elected	1912	1928	1996	Croat	Male	
Milovan Đilas	Old	Elected	1911	1933	1995	Montenegrin	Male	
Vlado Janić	New	Elected	1904	1931	1991	Croat	Male	
Edvard Kardelj	Old	Elected	1910	1928	1979	Slovene	Male	
Boris Kidrič	New	Elected	1912	1928	1953	Slovene	Male	
Rade Končar	New	WWII	1911	1934	1942	Croatian Serb	Male	
Vicko Krstulović	New	Elected	1905	1922	1988	Croat	Male	
Franc Leskošek	Old	Elected	1897	1926	1983	Slovene	Male	
Božo Ljumović	New	Not	1896	1919	1986	Montenegrin	Male	
Ivo Lola Ribar	New	WWII	1916	1936	1943	Croat	Male	
Miha Marinko	Old	Elected	1900	1923	1983	Slovene	Male	
Ivan Milutinović	New	WWII	1901	1923	1944	Montenegrin	Male	
Moša Pijade	New	Elected	1890	1920	1957	Serb /Jewish	Male	
Đuro Pucar	New	Elected	1899	1922	1979	Serb	Male	
Aleksandar Ranković	Old	Elected	1909	1928	1983	Serb	Male	
Stipe Romac	New	Expelled	1894	1932	1978	Croat	Male	
Metodi Shatorov	New	Expelled	1897	1940	1944	Macedonian	Male	
Josip Broz Tito	Old	Elected	1892	1920	1980	Croat	Male	
Vida Tomšič	New	Elected	1913	1934	1998	Slovene	Female	
Žarko Zrenjanin	New	WWII	1902	1927	1942	Serb	Male	
Sreten Žujović	New	Expelled	1899	1924	1976	Serb	Male	

Note: Andrija Herbang (1899-1949), Croat, was by-elected to CC of CPY in 1942 and expelled in 1948, arrested and killed in prison

==== Candidates ====
Note: Montenegrins Blažo Jovanović, Krsto Popivoda, Vladimir Popović and Svetozar Vukmanović were by-elected (coopted) to full CC membership during WWII

Candidates of the Central Committee of the 5th Conference of the Communist Party of Yugoslavia
Name	4th CO	5th CC	Birth	PM	Death	Nationality	Gender	Ref.
Ivan Amulić	New	Not	1911	1932	1973	Croat	Male	
Blažo Jovanović	New	Elected	1907	1924	1976	Montenegrin	Male	
Jovan Kovačević	New	WWII	1903	1922	1940?	Montenegrin	Male	
Boris Kraigher	New	Elected	1914	1934	1967	Slovene	Male	
Josip Kraš	Old	WWII	1900	1928	1941	Croat	Male	
Miloš Matijević	New	WWII	1902	1926	1941	Serb	Male	
Jordan Nikolov	New	WWII	1916	1935	1942	Macedonian	Male	
Marko Orešković	New	WWII	1896	1926	1941	Croat	Male	
Pavle Pap	New	WWII	1914	1933	1941	Hungarian	Male	
Krsto Popivoda	New	Elected	1910	1933	1988	Montenegrin	Male	
Vladimir Popović	New	Elected	1914	1932	1972	Montenegrin	Male	
Franc Salamon	New	WWII	1892	1920	1943	Slovene	Male	
Kosta Stamenković	New	WWII	1893	1919	1942	Serb	Male	
Slavko Šlander	New	WWII	1909	1932	1941	Slovene	Male	
Momir Tomić	New	Not	1909	1928	1979	Serb	Male	
Tone Tomšič	New	WWII	1910	1930	1942	Slovene	Male	
Svetozar Vukmanović	New	Elected	1912	1933	2000	Montenegrin	Male	
Boro Vukmirović	New	WWII	1912	1933	1943	Montenegrin	Male	
Miloš Zidanšek	New	WWII	1909	1933	1942	Slovene	Male	

== Bibliography ==
- Babić, Nikola; Hadžirović, Ahmed (1977). 70 godina sindikalnog pokreta u Bosni i Hercegovini [70 Years of the Trade Union Movement in Bosnia and Herzegovina]. Council of the Federation of Trade Unions of Bosnia and Herzegovina. ISBN 9781538119617.
- Bechev, Dimitar (2019). Historical Dictionary of North Macedonia. Rowman & Littlefield Publishers. ISBN 9781538119617.
- Brglez, Franček; Briški, Lojze (1979). Revirji v boju za socializem [Farmers in the Fight for Socialism] (in Slovenian). CZDO Komunist.
- Haug, Hilde Katrine (2012). Creating a Socialist Yugoslavia: Tito, Communist Leadership and the National Question. I.B. Tauris. ISBN 9781848850514.
- Kovačić, Ivo (1970). Radnički pokret Hrvatskog primorja, Gorskog Kotara i Istre 1919–1941 [Workers' Movement of the Croatian Littoral, Gorski Kotar and Istria 1919–1941.] (in Serbo-Croatian). Centar za historiju radničkog pokreta i NOR Istre, Hrvatskog primorja i Gorskog kotara.
- Lazarević, Božo (1987). Sećanje na rat i revoluciju: 1941–1945 [Remembrance of War and Revolution: 1941–1945] (in Serbo-Croatian). Vojnoizdavački i novinski centar.
- Lazarević, Dragica; Bosić, Milovan; Damjanović, Pero (1980). Peta zemaljska konferencija KPJ, (19–23. okt. 1940) [Fifth Territorial Conference of the CPY, (19–23 October 1940)] (in Serbo-Croatian). Komunist.
- Lewytzkyj, Borys; Stroynowski, Juliusz, eds. (1978). Who's Who in the Socialist Countries. K. G. Saur Verlag. ISBN 3-7940-3017-6.
- Marković, Moma (1987). Рат и револуција у Србији: сећања 1941–1945 [War and Revolution in Serbia: Memories 1941–1945] (in Serbo-Croatian). Beogradski izdavacko-graficki zavod. ISBN 9788613001140.
- Morača, Pero; Stojanović, Stanislav; Kruščić, Milutin; Maletić, Dušan (1979). Komunisti Jugoslavije 1919–1979 [Communists of Yugoslavia 1919–1979] (in Serbo-Croatian). Eksport pres.
- Prica, Srđa (1982). Godine koje su prošle: 1925–1937 [The Years That Passed: 1925–1937] (in Serbo-Croatian). NiŠRO "Oslobođenje," OOUR Izdavačka djelatnost.
- Staff writer, ed. (1966). Svjetski almanah [World Almanac] (in Serbo-Croatian). Vol. 4. Novinsko izdavačko poduzeće.
- Stroynowski, Juliusz, ed. (1989c). Who's Who in the Socialist Countries of Europe: P–Z. K. G. Saur Verlag. ISBN 3-598-10719-6.
- Tito, Josip Broz (1980). The Party of the Revolution: Fifth Conference of the Communist Party of Yugoslavia, 1940. Socialist Thought and Practice.
- Tito, Josip Broz (1982). Damjanović, Pero; Vujošević, Ubavka (eds.). Sabrana djela: Oktobar 1940-April 1941 [Selected Works: 1940 – April 1941] (in Serbo-Croatian). Institut za savremenu istoriju.
- Zalar, Charles, ed. (1961). Yugoslav Communism: A Critical Study. United States Government Printing Office. Archived from the original on 11 June 2023.
