= Milan Gorkić =

Yugoslav communist politician and activist (1904–1937)

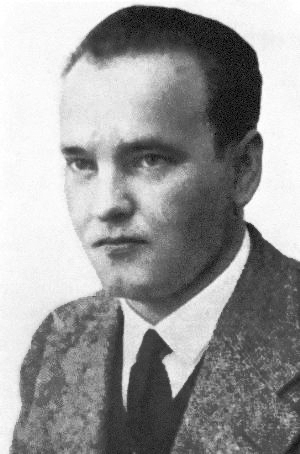
- Milan Gorkić photographed shortly after he was arrested by the NKVD in 1937

General Secretary of the Central Committee of the Communist Party of Yugoslavia
- In office 26 December 1934 – 23 October 1937
- Deputy: Josip Broz Tito
- Preceded by: Miloš Marković
- Succeeded by: Josip Broz Tito^{2}

Member of the Presidium of the Executive Committee of the Communist International
- In office 1927 – 23 October 1937

Personal details
- Born: Jozef Čižinsky; 19 February 1904 Bosanski Brod, Bosnia and Herzegovina, Austria-Hungary
- Died: 1 November 1937 (aged 33) Moscow, Russian SFSR, Soviet Union
- Resting place: Donskoy Cemetery, Moscow, Russia
- Citizenship: Austria-Hungary (until 1918) Yugoslavia (1918–1937)
- Party: Communist Party of Yugoslavia
- Other political affiliations: Comintern
- Spouse: Berta Glen
- Children: 1
- Occupation: Politician, revolutionary
- ^2 According to Pero Simić, after Gorkić had been arrested, CPY lost its Central Committee and was expelled from Comintern, which means that nobody succeeded Gorkić as leader of the CPY.

Milan Gorkić (Cyrillic: Милан Горкић), born as Josef Čižinský (Serbian Cyrillic: Јосип Чижински, romanized: Josip Čižinski; 19 February 1904 – 1 November 1937), was a high-ranking and prominent Yugoslav communist politician and activist. He was the General Secretary of the Communist Party of Yugoslavia (KPJ) in exile from 1932 until 1937 and also a prominent member of the Comintern.

Gorkić was executed by the NKVD in the Soviet Union during the Great Purge.

== Early life ==
=== Family ===
Gorkić was born Josef Čižinský in 1904 into a Czech family from Austria-Hungary that had settled in Sarajevo five years earlier in 1899. At the time, Bosnia-Herzegovina was still officially a vilayet within the Ottoman Empire though in actuality it was run as an occupational zone and a de facto part of Austria-Hungary.

His father, Václav Čižinský was an upholster who earlier held membership in the Social Democratic Party of Czechoslovakia. After a short holiday in his hometown, he brought his wife, Gorkić's mother, Antonija Mimerova to Bosnia and Herzegovina. She worked as a seamstress. In Bosnia and Herzegovina his father worked for the Austrian-Hungarian administration. Gorkić was born in Sarajevo in 1904; his older brother Ladislav (1901) was a machinist and younger brother Bohumil was an architect who lived in Czechoslovakia until 1986.

In 1921, Gorkić's family was deported back to Czechoslovakia, after his father was involved in a strike and accusations of being a communist and a serbophobe. Gorkić was also previously arrested for communist activity, which contributed to his family's deportation.

=== Education ===
Gorkić entered elementary school in Bosanski Brod in 1910. As a good student, he continued high school education in Derventa, but soon left the school because of the World War. In order to avoid losing an academic year, he tried to enter high school in Slavonski Brod, but this school was also closed, so he studied grade five privately. In 1915, Gorkić succeeded in starting grade six in High People's Students' School, a lower high school, entering its second grade. In 1918 he returned to Sarajevo and took entrance exam in order to enroll in the Sarajevo Commerce Academy.

=== Early activity ===
During a time spent in Commercial Academy, Gorkić joined the Organization of Intellectual Workers as a fifteen-year-old. Gorkić and other members of the organisation had meetings in Workers' Home, where they read works of Karl Marx and Friedrich Engels, as well as Miroslav Krleža's revolutionary magazine "Plamen". On 1 May 1919 he was arrested along with some of his comrades. On 4 December 1919, Young Communist League of Yugoslavia (SKOJ) was established in Sarajevo; Gorkić was elected to its leadership. In 1921, after First Congress of SKOJ, it was decided that SKOJ would be split in two branches, apprentices' and students' branch. Gorkić was named secretary of students' branch. In one newspaper article from 14 October Gorkić used his pseudonym for the very first time. On 28 November 1920, he held a motivational speech in Derventa for members of the Communist Party of Yugoslavia (KPJ) and called them to vote for leaders of the KPJ. In December 1920, Gorkić held teachings in Workers' Home in Sarajevo, and soon become one of the most active communists.

On the night of 29/30 December, the government proclaimed Obznana, a proclamation in which he forbade further activity of the KPJ. Thousands of communists were arrested and their organisations broken. After proclamation of Obznana, KPJ and SKOJ were scattered. Gorkić played a key role in reorganisation of the KPJ and SKOJ. He became Secretary of the Regional Committee of the SKOJ. In a report to KPJ's congress held in Vienna in 1922, Gorkić stated that before Obznana, regional SKOJ had 300 members, and after Obznana regional SKOJ did not have a single member, they only maintained contacts. He and his associates established an illegal organization as a core for future organizing. Soon, they had been provided with a hectograph to multiply propaganda leaflets. Gorkić was assigned to work with the leaflets. Before that, in 1921, he wrote to his illegal organisation in Derventa and this letter was found by the police. In the letter, Gorkić wrote in detail about organisation's activity and meeting place that was supposed to be held in Belgrade. However, the meeting never took place, because a communist, Spasoje Stević, made a failed assassination attempt on King Alexander, who was at the time, a regent. In July 1921 Gorkić visited Belgrade with his friend, Maks Schwarz, but, after they returned to Brod, both of them were arrested on 29 July. Gorkić stated to the police that he did not go to Belgrade because of the conference, but for education. Gorkić's activity was observed by the police for a longer period. Gorkić was heard by police on 2 August and spent six months in prison, when he was bailed out by the party along with other imprisoned communists. He was expelled from Commercial Academy when he was in third grade. He did not return home to his parents, but instead, continued his political activity. In time, while he was still imprisoned, Gorkić's family was deported back to Czechoslovakia. His father had been accused of communism and anti-Serb sentiment. After Gorkić had been released from prison, he started to work as an editor of Sarajevan workers' magazine "Radničko jedinstvo" (Workers' Unity). As an editor, he wrote about the international political scene. In 1923, Gorkić was employed in another magazine, named "Narod" (The People). He worked in this magazine until he left the country. During all that time, he was under police surveillance.

After his release in 1922, Gorkić was once again under police investigation and it was planned by the police to deport him also once the investigation ended. His travel abroad was forbidden, however, he successfully entered and left the country several times. Actually, he was a delegate on first two illegal conferences held in 1922 and 1923. The First Conference was held in Vienna between 3 and 17 April 1922, where Gorkić participated as a delegate for Bosnia. With other members of Bosnian delegation, Gorkić arrived to Austria 16 days earlier, as they were misinformed. KPJ's conferences in Vienna played a significant role in history of KPJ. The Deputy Executive Committee was founded to lead members of the party that stayed in country after Alexander's Obznana forbade future activity of the KPJ. Other members emigrated. On Viennese first conference held in September 1921, those in emigration founded Emigration Committee as leading organ of the party. By such act, KPJ actually had two leaderships, one operating in Belgrade while other in Vienna. Majority of members in emigration expressed their wishes to abolish Emigration Committee, while a Montenegrin, Sima Marković, disapproved that and named himself leader of the Emigration Committee. To avoid disagreement, members of the KPJ agreed to solve problems on a conference, that was held in April 1922. Gorkić was especially active on this conference. Some members proposed that members of KPJ's youth wing, the SKOJ, should also vote. This proposition passed with 13 votes against 12; Gorkić's vote was among those 12. On VIII session held on 10 July 1922, Gorkić was elected to a commission that would deal with political, organization and union matters. On this very session, a decision was made to criticize the activity of Marković and his associate Ilija Milkić, but not to punish them. It was stated that both of them justified their mistakes. Gorkić disagreed with this decision and asked for a withdrawal of statement that they "justified their mistakes". Marković and Milkić left the session, so Gorkić argued that decision should be made by the Comintern. Also, Gorkić disagreed on question of whether the Emigration Committee should exist. The voting was made on the matter of whether the majority of leadership be stationed in Belgrade. There was 16 votes for yes and 2 were against – Gorkić and Mark voted and expressed that the whole leadership should be in Belgrade.

After Gorkić returned to Sarajevo in May 1923, he continued to work for the "Narod" and the "Radničko jednistvo" magazines. Soon, he was once again arrested for carrying communist literature and was sentenced on 20 days in prison. The judge stated that police should take care that Gorkić and his associate not leave the country, however, Gorkić emigrated in July 1923, after which he only briefly returned in Yugoslavia for several times. Police were unable to find out when Gorkić left Yugoslavia. Before that, Gorkić stayed in Zagreb under the pretext that he attended Export Academy, which enabled him to leave the country. On 24 March 1924, police made a warrant for Gorkić and another group of communists in Sarajevo. When the group was under trial in 1925, Gorkić was in Moscow. Gorkić left Sarajevo eight months before his absence was noticed by the police. He left Yugoslavia on 9 May 1924 in order to participate at the Second Conference of the KPJ in Vienna. In autumn 1925 police became interested in Gorkić for a second time after it was found out that Gorkić was once again involved in illegal doings. In October 1925, the police authorities informed the prefect of Sarajevo region that Gorkić was in Belgrade at the end of June 1925 as a courier from Moscow. Prefect of Sarajeo informed authorities in Belgrade to arrest Gorkić if he enters Yugoslavia one more time. Yugoslav police were unable to arrest him and on 12 March 1926 they condemned Gorkić once again while he was in absence. He was charged with 1250 Yugoslav dinar. His other two colleagues were charged as well. All three of them later complained about the court's decision via lawyer in Sarajevo. On 11 March 1930 the court made a decision to decline their complaint as they were considered fugitives.

He became member of the SKOJ's Central Committee in 1924, but was soon expelled from the Kingdom of Yugoslavia, after which he became representative of the KPJ in the Comintern in Moscow. After three years working as a representative, he was elected to the Presidium of the Executive Committee of the Communist International in Moscow (ECCI) in 1927. At the same time he worked in ECCI's secretariat as a commissioner for the Balkan countries.

As a member of party, Gorkić traveled a lot: in Austria, Germany and Czechoslovakia. In Germany he married Betty Nikolayevna Glan, also member of the Comintern, and had a daughter named Jelena with her. At the beginning of 1928 he was elected Secretary of the Communist International of Moscow, and in summer he was elected to Comintern's International Control Commission. In 1930 he was Comintern's representative in the British Communist Party. At the same time, he worked for the KPJ and Balkan Secretariat of the Comintern headed by Georgi Dimitrov. From 1928 until 1931, Gorkić was also an associate of Nemanja Borjan.

== Leader of the Communist Party of Yugoslavia ==
The Communist Party of Yugoslavia was amongst the most disciplined communist parties within the Comintern. At the end of the 1920s, the KPJ came under a faction struggle between the so-called left-wing and the right-wing. The left-wing was subordinated to the Comintern, while the right-wing wanted to secede from the Comintern with its special views. It was often called revisionist faction. Later, this struggle grew into clashes, similar to those that Joseph Stalin led with Trotskyists and Bukharinists.

In June 1932 Gorkić was appointed to the provisional leadership of the KPJ under the pseudonym Sommer. Gorkić returned to Yugoslavia several times, but when he was elected as general secretary of the KPJ, he was forbidden from entering Yugoslavia for safety reasons. From 1932 he led Central Committee of the KPJ in exile, in Vienna, Paris, and Moscow. In November 1932 in the text published in the official gazette of the KPJ, Gorkić criticised leaders of communists from Dalmatia because they did not join Ustaše during the Velebit uprising.

In 1933, it was decided that communist parties in the Soviet Union must be purged in order to raise ideological strength. Those purges were mandatory for the KPJ as well. On 28 February 1933, the Central Committee of the KPJ made a resolution about the results of the purge. The reason for that was conflict with Đuro Cvijić (aka Kirsch), who opposed intervention of other communist parties in internal policy of the KPJ. The Central Committee of the KPJ reacted very fiercely on Cvijić's accusations and claimed that the purge was not the reason for the organisational breakdown of the KPJ, but breakdown of certain persons who were "undisciplined, and lacked verification of loyalty to the Comintern," and "liquidation of fractionism within the KPJ." One of the reasons for Đajić's accusation was because his wife, Tatjana Marinić, was expelled from the KPJ, as she claimed that the KPJ's purge did not meet conditions of the Comintern. Cvijić himself was also investigated.

In November–December 1933, Gorkić travelled to the Kingdom of Yugoslavia to prepare for the fourth Party Conference. In the process, in July 1934, he named Josip Broz Tito to the temporary leadership and he, himself, didn't participate at the conference held in Ljubljana in December 1934. Gorkić was a dominant figure in the KPJ and he succeeded in reviving the party.

The meeting of the Transitional Leadership of the KPJ, composed by Gorkić, Vladimir Ćopić and Blagoje Parović, held a meeting on 26 April 1933, where it was stated that the purge was "absolutely correct and made on time," claiming that the leadership of the KPJ completed its task. The leadership also demanded that the KPJ must raise its ideological teaching amongst members of the party after the purge. It was decided that a prominent members that were expelled from the party should get a chance to confess their mistakes in order to return into the KPJ. Soon after the purge, Gorkić wrote an article called "On Purge of Lines of Our Party" (O čišćenju redova naše partije). In the article, Gorkić claims that the purge had educational character. Nevertheless, the KPJ's purges under Gorkić's leadership were not connected to the harsh purges conducted by Stalin.

Gorkić rarely stayed in Moscow. From 1932 until 1936 he stayed in Moscow only for three months. In 1935 he was a delegate on the Seventh Congress of Comintern where he was elected to the executive committee.

During a Congress of the Comintern in the end of July 1935 held in Moscow, Gorkić met with Yugoslav delegates at a session. There, he warned that Yugoslavia is a multi-national country and that since the day Yugoslavia was created, the national question was the most heated issue in the country, out of which the Croatian question is the most important. He concluded that the struggle of the oppressed people largely influenced the crisis of fascism. Nevertheless, he said that the great success of the Communist Party of Yugoslavia lies in its successful assurance of the oppressed peoples that the communists are on their side and that those people can count on the working class. After that, the Communist Party issued a directive to the Croatian communists to enter the Croatian Peasant Party, a leading Croat party in Yugoslavia at the time, and to take over leading position within it.

As part of its national policy established by Gorkić, the Communist Party of Yugoslavia in 1937 founded the Communist Party of Croatia and Communist Party of Slovenia. It was a tactical move of the Yugoslav Communist Party conditioned by the escalation of the inter-national relations in Yugoslavia. This was part of the reorganisation of the Communist Party of Yugoslavia based on the national criterion that reflected "national-political character of Yugoslavia".

=== The Great Purge ===
The first mass arrests in the Soviet Union occurred in summer 1936, during the Great Purge. The Old bolsheviks, Grigory Zinoviev, Mikhail Tomsky, Ivan Smirnov, Alexei Rykov, Lev Kamenev, Grigori Sokolnikov and Gorkić's mentor Bukharin were victims. Rykov and Bukharin were, however, tried on the third process. During their process, the official statement of the Central Committee of the KPJ called Bukharin and Rykov "Trotskyst-Zinovievist fascist bandits" who were "discarded by workers' masses for their criminal fight against realisation of the ingenious Stalin's plans." Both of them were executed by a firing squad. Moreover, in the official statement, two members of the KPJ, dr. Ante Ciliga and Voja Vujović, were accused for cooperation with the arrested old bolsheviks and were also proclaimed to be Benito Mussolini's spies. The KPJ under Gorkić's leadership thus completely supported the Stalin's Great Purge and the official statement was, at the same time, an invitation for purges within the KPJ itself as well.

In 1936 the seat of the KPJ was transferred from Vienna to Paris, so Gorkić was commuting between the French capital and Moscow. At the beginning of 1937 he was in Paris and for the last time in his life, he met his wife, in Germany. During the struggle for leadership of the KPJ, Josip Broz Tito was an agent of the NKVD, the Soviet secret police. In order to replace Gorkić , Tito submitted a report about Gorkić to the NKVD.

He has only one drawback: he holds everything in his hands – I talked about that at one session of the Central Committee. It's hard to say for which reason is he doing so. It is possible that he doesn't have enough confidence in the political ability of comrades. He behaves with people like he trusts them, and if a person is talkative it can earn his trust, and such people should be careful with, they need to be checked more often."

— Tito on Gorkić

Gorkić received an emergency call from the Comintern in Moscow to return and make a report in June 1937. He was accused of being a British spy. On 23 October he was arrested and imprisoned in Lubyanka. On 1 November Gorkić was executed. After Tito took leadership over the KPJ, Gorkić was posthumously expelled from the party. His wife Betti Glan, director of the Park of Culture in Moscow, was soon arrested as well; she was released in 1954 and rehabilitated in 1955. During the Great Purge, a large number of communists from Yugoslavia resided in the Soviet Union. Hundreds of them were arrested and executed without any trial under accusation that they were either spies or Trotskyists. Communists who led the KPJ before Gorkić, Filip Filipović (1938), Sima Marković (1937), Đuka Cvijić (1937), Jovan Mališić (1938) and Antun Mavrak (1938) were also executed during the purge.

After Joseph Stalin's death, the Soviet Union rehabilitated Gorkić.

== Works ==
- Gorkić, Milan (1937). Novim putevima (pouke iz provala) [Towards the New Paths (the Lessons from Intrusions)] (in Serbo-Croatian). Brussels.
- Gorkić, Milan (1987). Revolucija pod okriljem Kominterne [Revolution Under the Aegis of the Comintern] (in Serbo-Croatian).

Gorkić is author of a brochure Communists and the Croatian question (Komunisti i hrvatsko pitanje, 1934), but the content of the brochure remains unknown, even though the Communist Party of Yugoslavia ordered its printing in December 1934.
