= Leader of the League of Communists of Yugoslavia =

Highest-standing official of the League of Communists of Yugoslavia

- Emblems of the LCY

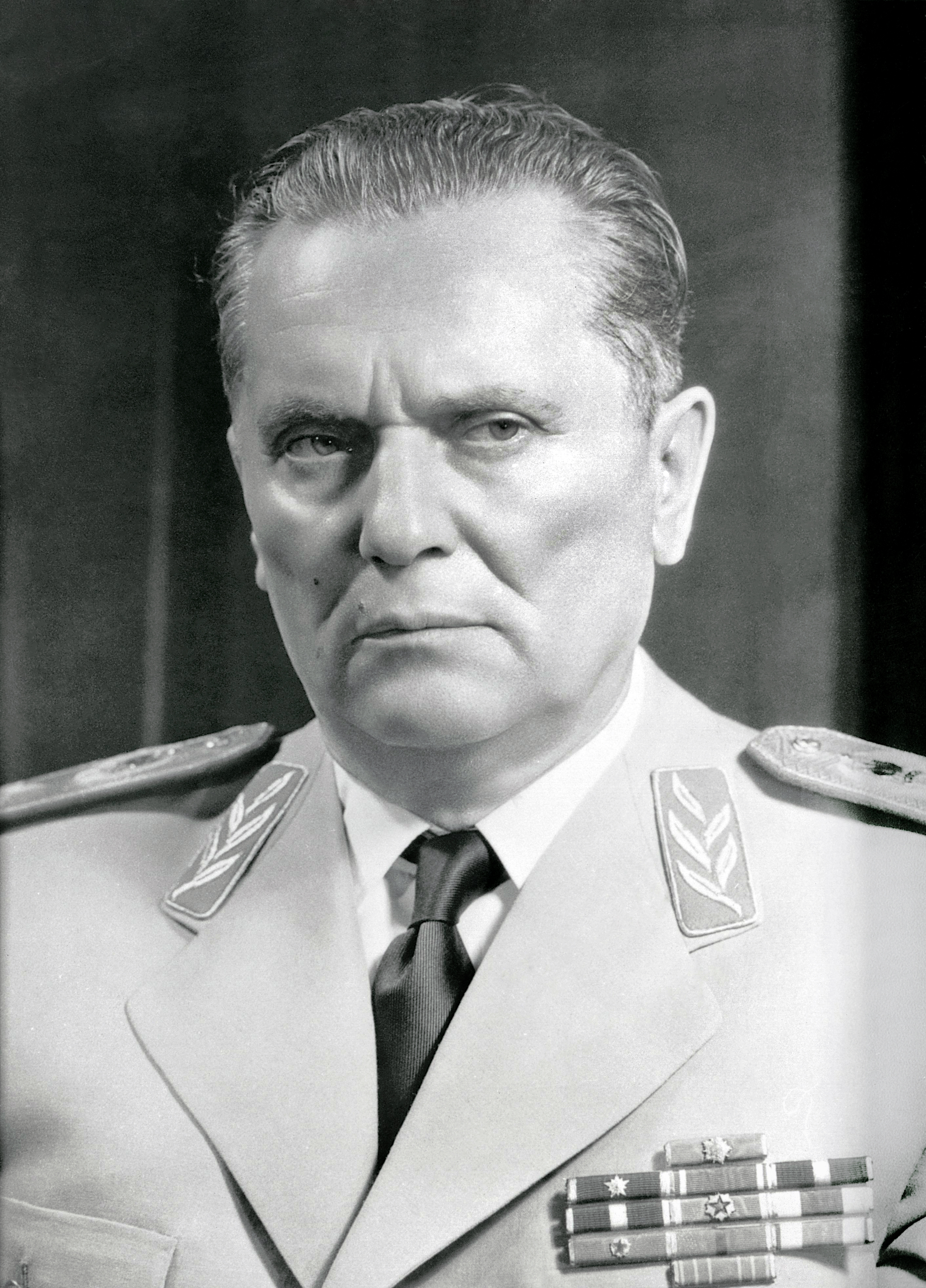
- Longest serving Josip Broz Tito; 5 January 1939 – 4 May 1980
- Seat: Palace of Socio-Political Organisations, Belgrade (1964–91); Marx and Engels Square, Belgrade (1945–1964)
- Appointer: Presidency (1980–90); Central Committee (1919–80)
- Constituting instrument: Statute of the League of Communists of Yugoslavia
- Formation: 23 April 1919
- First holder: Filip Filipović
- Final holder: Miroslav Ivanović
- Abolished: 22 January 1991

The leader of the League of Communists of Yugoslavia (LCY) was first established as an office on 23 April 1919 under the name "Secretary of the Central Committee" (later renamed "Political Secretary of the Central Committee" at the 3rd Congress in 1926). However, in reality, power in this period was shared in a collective leadership with the "Technical Secretary of the Central Committee" (later renamed "Organisational Secretary of the Central Committee" in 1926). When the office of political secretary changed its name on 8 December 1936 to "General Secretary of the Central Committee", the position became more powerful. It kept that name until its abolition on 4 October 1966, when it was replaced by the "President of the Central Committee". This office lasted until 15 March 1969, when it was replaced by the office of the "President of the League of Communists". Upon the death of Josip Broz Tito, the office of president was replaced with the "President of the Presidency of the Central Committee of the League of Communists". This office lasted a decade. With several branches having already left the LCY, the remaining members of the Central Committee of the 13th Congress established the office of "Coordinator of the Presidency of the Central Committee" on 23 May 1990. Three days later, on 26 May, the 14th Congress reconvened and elected a provisional leadership, with the leader holding the office of "Chairman of the Committee for the Preparation of the Congress of Democratic and Programmatic Renewal of the Central Committee". For most of its existence, the officeholder was the de facto leader of the Socialist Federal Republic of Yugoslavia.

== Institutional history ==
With the establishment of the Kingdom of Serbs, Croats, and Slovenes on 1 December 1918, the socialist movements of the different provinces, chiefly the Serbian Social Democratic Party and the Social Democratic Party of Bosnia–Herzegovina, sought to unify the movement by creating an all-Yugoslav party. The LCY's founding congress, held on 20–23 April 1919, established this party and named it the Socialist Labour Party of Yugoslavia (Communists). The party organisation was led by the offices of secretary and technical secretary of the Central Council. The congress elected two secretaries; Filip Filipović and Živko Topalović. Of the two, Filipović was of the highest rank and acted informally as the party's first secretary, that is, party leader. Vladimir Ćopić, the elected technical secretary, was third-ranked in the leadership.

The 2nd Congress, convened on 20–25 June 1920, renamed the party the Communist Party of Yugoslavia (CPY). It also established the office of president of the Central Council, which existed alongside the offices of secretary and technical secretary until the party's banning in 1921. The ban forced the party underground, and a new leadership headed by Triša Kaclerović was established by the 6th Session of the Central Council of the 2nd Congress, held on 2–3 June 1921. An indirect consequence of the ban was that the offices of president and technical secretary were abolished. At the 3rd CPY Congress, held on 17–22 May 1926, the secretaryship was named political secretary while the Central Council was renamed the Central Committee. From then on, the party leader's formal title was political secretary of the party Central Committee. With the party facing fierce troubles during the 1920s and early 1930s, the leadership was continually reorganised by the Communist International (Comintern). On 8 December 1936, the Executive Committee of the Comintern decided to designate the incumbent political secretary, Milan Gorkić, as general secretary of the CPY Central Committee. The name change informally consolidated Gorkić's powers, in part because the Soviet communist party was headed by a general secretary. Gorkić held the post for less than a year due to being recalled to the Soviet Union in the middle of 1937, where he was accused of counter-revolutionary activities and executed by state authorities.

The general secretary presided over the work of the Politburo, the party's political organ, and led the work of the Secretariat, the party's executive organ. The most powerful members of the Politburo concurrently served as members of the Secretariat. The four secretaries that made up the Secretariat (Tito, Aleksandar Ranković, Edvard Kardelj and Milovan Djilas) had considerable informal influence on the Politburo. They would often decide on policies before meetings and get the Politburo to rubber stamp them. Tito, as general secretary, had considerable influence over the selection of the composition of the central committee and its Politburo.

During the 1940s, Tito, the sitting general secretary, began abrogating the responsibilities of the Politburo and centralising power in his own hands. According to Ranković, a member of both the Politburo and the Secretariat, exchanges between the Yugoslav party and its Soviet counterpart were hidden from the Politburo. Upon asking Tito at a Politburo session to publicise this information to the gathered attendees, Tito responded, "I am the [general secretary] of the party. I have the right to decide what to tell you and the others." During World War II, Tito, as general secretary, was also elected the chairman of the Military Committee of the CPY Central Committee on 10 April 1940. This institution was later transformed into the Supreme Headquarters of the People's Liberation Army and Partisan Detachments of Yugoslavia, which was transformed into a state institution with the establishment of the Federal People's Republic of Yugoslavia (FPRY) on 31 January 1946. The FPRY was established as a people's democratic state and adopted a communist form of government where the communist party had seized a monopoly on state power by having a two-thirds majority in the highest state organ of power, that is, the National Assembly. These power relations between the general secretary and the remainder of the party leadership remained intact until the dissolution of the Secretariat in 1966.

The 5th Session of the Central Committee of the 8th Congress, held on 4 October 1966, abolished the general secretary and the executive committee and replaced them with the office of president of the LCY Central Committee and the LCY Presidency. The 9th LCY Congress, held on 11–15 March 1969, adopted a statute that abolished the LCY Central Committee and replaced it with an annually convened conference. That meant that, by extension, the office of president of the LCY Central Committee was abolished and replaced by the office of president of the LCY. It was the responsibility of the president of the LCY to direct the work of the presidency as well as to convene and preside over its meetings. During sessions of the presidency, the conference and at the congress, the LCY president had the right to raise questions. Up until the election of the working presidency, the LCY president was responsible for inaugurating and presiding over the congress and conference. It was the incumbent's responsibility to maintain communication with the LCY republican branches, to represent the LCY abroad, and to present and defend the LCY's policies and practices. The statute adopted at the 9th LCY Congress stated that the president was elected by the congress and was accountable to it, the conference, and the presidency.

At the 10th Congress of the LCY, held on 27–30 May 1974, the Central Committee was reestablished. Tito was elected to serve an unlimited term as the president of the LCY by the 10th Congress. This decision was later reconfirmed by the 11th LCY Congress, held on 20–23 June 1978, and the decision was incorporated into the party statute. Despite serving an unlimited term, Tito as president of the LCY remained accountable to the LCY Central Committee. Earlier, at the 2nd Conference on 25–27 January 1972, the office of "Secretary of the Executive Bureau of the Presidency of the Central Committee" was established, with the Slovene Stane Dolanc as its first officeholder, and two years before Tito's death, on 19 October 1978, the presidency established the office of "Chairman of the Presidency of the Central Committee". The president of the LCY functioned as the primus inter pares of these three offices. After Tito's death, the LCY Central Committee opted to abolish the office of president of the LCY and rename the chairmanship the president of the presidency. The president of the presidency was limited to a one-year term, and the secretary of the presidency to a two-year term limit.

The LCY Presidency elected the president of the presidency from among its members. The elected president of the presidency had to be from a different republic or autonomous province than the secretary of the presidency. The president of the presidency was to preside over the sessions of the presidency, and in conjunction with the presidency secretary, the relevant presidency member in charge of the specific policy area in question and the executive secretaries could set the agenda for sessions of the presidency. Per party rules, the officeholder had to maintain contact with individual presidency members and the presidency as a whole alongside the secretary of the presidency. Only after consulting with individual members and the secretary could the incumbent implement the work programme and decisions adopted by the LCY Central Committee and the presidency. The officeholder was an ex officio member of the state presidency until the party backed constitutional amendments that removed this right. By right of office, the president of the presidency was also a member of the LCY Central Committee delegation to the Conference of the Socialist Alliance of Working People.

At the 26th Session of the Central Committee of the 13th Congress, held on 11 September 1989, Bosnian Croat Ivan Brigić, who led the work on formulating amendments to the party statute at the upcoming 14th Congress, proposed abolishing the presidency and replacing it with a new executive body and abolishing the office of president of the presidency and reintroducing the post of president of the LCY Central Committee, who could serve for a two-year term. The 14th Congress, when it first convened on 20–22 January, failed to elect an LCY Central Committee, adopt a new programme and party statute. The sitting president of the presidency, Milan Pančevski, who was originally going to step down at the congress, continued to serve until his term expired on 17 May, but no successor was elected to replace him. When the 32nd Session of the Central Committee of the 13th Congress convened on 23 May, it elected Montenegrin presidency member Miomir Grbović as coordinator instead of acting president of the presidency. Three days later, on 26 May, the 14th Congress elected a provisional leadership to convene the 15th LCY Congress. It failed in its task, and on 22 January 1991, it—the last federal organ of the LCY—self-dissolved.

Institutional history of the highest-standing office of the League of Communists of Yugoslavia
Title	Established	Abolished	Established by	Ref.
Secretary of the Central Council of the Communist Party of Yugoslavia Serbo-Croatian: Sekretar Centralnog saveta Komunističke partije Jugoslavije	23 April 1919	22 May 1926	1st Congress	
Technical Secretary of the Central Council of the Communist Party of Yugoslavia Serbo-Croatian: Tehnički sekretar Centralnog saveta Komunističke partije Jugoslavije	23 April 1919	3 June 1921	1st Congress	
President of the Central Council of the Communist Party of Yugoslavia Serbo-Croatian: Predsednik Centralnog saveta Komunističke partije Jugoslavije	24 June 1920	3 June 1921	2nd Congress	
Political Secretary of the Central Committee of the Communist Party of Yugoslavia Serbo-Croatian: Politički sekretar Centralnog komiteta Komunističke partije Jugoslavije	22 May 1926	8 December 1936	3rd Congress	
Organisational Secretary of the Central Committee of the Communist Party of Yugoslavia Serbo-Croatian: Organizacioni sekretar Centralnog komiteta Komunističke partije Jugoslavije	22 May 1926	8 December 1936	3rd Congress	
General Secretary of the Central Committee of the League of Communists of Yugoslavia Serbo-Croatian: Generalni sekretar Centralnog komiteta Saveza komunista Jugoslavije	8 December 1936	4 October 1966	Communist International	
President of the Central Committee of the League of Communists of Yugoslavia Serbo-Croatian: Predsednik Centralnog komiteta Saveza komunista Jugoslavije	4 October 1966	15 March 1969	5th Session of the 8th Central Committee	
President of the League of Communists of Yugoslavia Serbo-Croatian: Predsednik Saveza komunista Jugoslavije	15 March 1969	29 June 1982	9th Congress	
President of the Presidency of the Central Committee of the League of Communists of Yugoslavia Serbo-Croatian: Predsednik Predsedništva Centralnog komiteta Saveza komunista Jugoslavije	4 May 1980	23 May 1990	11th Session of the 11th Central Committee	
Coordinator of the Presidency of the Central Committee of the League of Communists of Yugoslavia Serbo-Croatian: Koordinator Predsedništva Centralnog komiteta Saveza komunista Jugoslavije	23 May 1990	26 May 1990	32nd Session of the 13th Central Committee	
Chairman of the Committee for the Preparation of the Congress of Democratic and Programmatic Renewal of the Central Committee of the League of Communists of Yugoslavia Serbo-Croatian: Predsednik Odbora za pripremu kongresa demokratske i programske obnove Centralnog komiteta Saveza komunista Jugoslavije	26 May 1990	22 January 1991	14th Extraordinary Congress	

== Early years (1919–36) ==
=== Political Secretary ===
Political secretaries of the Central Committee of the Communist Party of Yugoslavia
No.	Officeholder	Took office	Left office	Tenure	Term	Birth	PM	Death	Ethnicity	Ref.
1	Filip Filipović	23 April 1919	3 June 1921	2 years, 41 days	1st–2nd (1919–26)	1878	1919	1938	Serb	
1	Živko Topalović	23 April 1919	24 June 1920	1 year, 62 days	1st (1919–20)	1886	1919	1972	Serb	
2	Sima Marković	24 June 1920	3 June 1921	344 days	2nd (1920–26)	1888	1919	1939	Serb	
3	Triša Kaclerović	3 June 1921	17 July 1922	1 year, 45 days	2nd (1920–26)	1879	1919	1964	Serb	
2	Sima Marković	17 July 1922	12 May 1923	299 days	2nd (1920–26)	1888	1919	1939	Serb	
3	Triša Kaclerović	12 May 1923	22 May 1926	3 years, 10 days	2nd (1920–26)	1879	1919	1964	Serb	
2	Sima Marković	22 May 1926	1 December 1927	1 year, 193 days	3rd (1926–28)	1888	1919	1939	Serb	
4	Đuro Cvijić	1 December 1927	13 April 1928	134 days	3rd (1926–28)	1896	1919	1938	Croat	
5	Jovan Mališić	27 November 1928	11 August 1930	1 year, 257 days	4th (1928–48)	1902	1919	1939	Montenegrin	
1	Filip Filipović	December 1931	2 April 1932	Unclear	4th (1928–48)	1878	1919	1938	Serb	
6	Miloš Marković	2 April 1932	June 1932	Unclear	4th (1928–48)	1901	1920	1933	Serb	
7	Milan Gorkić	26 December 1934	8 December 1936	1 year, 348 days	4th (1928–48)	1904	1919	1937	Czech	

=== President ===
Presidents of the Central Council of the Communist Party of Yugoslavia
No.	Officeholder		Took office	Left office	Tenure	Term	Birth	PM	Death	Ethnicity	Ref.
1		Pavle Pavlović	24 June 1920	3 June 1921	344 days	2nd (1920–26)	1888	1919	1971	Serb	
1	―	Jakov Lastrić	24 June 1920	3 June 1921	344 days	2nd (1920–26)	1885	1919	1938	Croat	

== Officeholders (1936–91) ==
Leaders of the League of Communists of Yugoslavia
No.	Officeholder		Took office	Left office	Tenure	Term	Birth	PM	Death	Branch	Ethnicity	Ref.
1		Milan Gorkić	8 December 1936	17 August 1937	252 days	4th (1928–48)	1904	1919	1937	No branch	Czech	
2		Josip Broz Tito	5 January 1939	4 May 1980	41 years, 120 days	4th–11th (1928–82)	1892	1920	1980	No branch	Croat	
3		Stevan Doronjski	4 May 1980	20 October 1980	169 days	11th (1978–82)	1919	1939	1981	Vojvodina	Serb	
4		Lazar Mojsov	20 October 1980	20 October 1981	1 year	11th (1978–82)	1920	1940	2011	Macedonia	Macedonian	
5	―	Dušan Dragosavac	20 October 1981	29 June 1982	252 days	11th (1978–82)	1919	1940	2014	Croatia	Serb	
6		Mitja Ribičič	29 June 1982	30 June 1983	1 year, 1 day	12th (1982–86)	1919	1941	2013	Slovenia	Slovene	
7		Dragoslav Marković	30 June 1983	26 June 1984	362 days	12th (1982–86)	1920	1939	2005	Serbia	Serb	
8	―	Ali Šukrija	26 June 1984	25 June 1985	364 days	12th (1982–86)	1919	1939	2005	Kosovo	Albanian	
9		Vidoje Žarković	25 June 1985	28 June 1986	1 year, 3 days	12th (1982–86)	1927	1943	2000	Montenegro	Montenegrin	
10	―	Milanko Renovica	28 June 1986	30 June 1987	1 year, 2 days	13th (1986–90)	1928	1947	2013	Bosnia-Herzegovina	Serb	
11		Boško Krunić	30 June 1987	30 June 1988	1 year	13th (1986–90)	1929	1946	2017	Vojvodina	Serb	
12	―	Stipe Šuvar	30 June 1988	17 May 1989	321 days	13th (1986–90)	1936	1955	2004	Croatia	Croat	
13	―	Milan Pančevski	17 May 1989	17 May 1990	1 year	13th (1986–90)	1935	1957	2019	Macedonia	Macedonian	
14	―	Miomir Grbović	23 May 1990	26 May 1990	3 days	13th (1986–90)	1951	1973	Alive	Montenegro	Montenegrin	
15	―	Miroslav Ivanović	26 May 1990	22 January 1991	241 days	PROV (1990–91)	1955	?	Alive	Montenegro	Montenegrin	
