= Karlo Štajner =

Austrian-Yugoslav communist activist

- Štajner with his book Seven Thousand Days in Siberia, 1988
- Born: Karl Steiner; 15 January 1902; Vienna, Austria-Hungary
- Died: 1 April 1992 (aged 90); Zagreb, Croatia
- Citizenship: Yugoslav
- Occupations: printing worker, politician, author
- Known for: surviving 20 years in the Gulag
- Notable work: "Seven Thousand Days in Siberia"
- Political party: Communist Youth of Austria; Communist Party of Yugoslavia
- Spouse: Sonya Štajner

Karlo Štajner (15 January 1902 – 1 April 1992) was an Austrian-Yugoslav communist activist, prominent Gulag survivor and memoirist. Štajner was born in Vienna, where he joined the Communist Youth of Austria, but emigrated to the Kingdom of Serbs, Croats and Slovenes in 1922 on the order of the Young Communist International to help the newly established Communist Party of Yugoslavia. After an illegal communist printing house in Zagreb where Štajner worked was raided by the police in 1931, he fled Yugoslavia, visiting Paris, Vienna, and Berlin before finally settling in the Soviet Union in 1932, where he worked in the Comintern publishing house in Moscow. During the Great Purge in 1936, Štajner was arrested and spent the next 17 years in prisons and gulags and three more years in exile in Siberia. He was released in 1956, after having been rehabilitated, and returned to Yugoslavia. He spent the rest of his life in Zagreb with his wife Sonya whom he married in Moscow in the 1930s.

In 1971, Štajner published a memoir book titled "Seven Thousand Days in Siberia" about his experiences in the Soviet Union. The book was a bestseller in Yugoslavia and was named the "book of the year 1972" by the Vjesnik newspaper.

== Biography ==
Štajner was born Karl Steiner in Vienna, Austria-Hungary on 15 January 1902. He worked as printing worker when he joined the communist movement in the First Austrian Republic in 1919. He became a member of the Communist Youth of Austria and later became a member of the organization's Central Committee. The Communist Party of Yugoslavia (CPY) was banned in December 1920 and all communist activities were prohibited by the regime of Alexander I of Yugoslavia. In December 1921, Štajner was sent to the Kingdom of Serbs, Croats and Slovenes by the Young Communist International to help the CPY. From January 1922 until 1931, he lived in Zagreb, where he ran an illegal communist printing house, and was helping the local CPY cell. During this time, he became a citizen of the Kingdom of Yugoslavia.

In 1931, Yugoslav police found out about the printing house, so Štajner fled the country to avoid arrest. He initially traveled to Paris where the Central Committee of CPY had its side-base. He lived in Paris for almost a year, but was arrested for his communist activity and expelled from France. He moved to Vienna, where he tried to establish an illegal printing house in order to distribute communist literature all over the Balkans. There, Štajner was arrested again, and expelled from Austria, as he was no longer a citizen of that country. Georgi Dimitrov helped him travel to Berlin to avoid being extradited to Yugoslavia, and to help the Communist Party of Germany. Facing arrest once again, he fled Germany and traveled to the Soviet Union in July 1932.

Štajner settled in Moscow, where he was appointed manager of the Comintern publishing house. While in Moscow, he met and married Russian girl Sofya "Sonya" Yefimovna Moiseeva in 1935. On 4 November 1936, during the height of the Great Purge, Štajner was arrested by the NKVD agents and accused of being a "counterrevolutionary, Gestapo agent, and accomplice in the murder of Sergey Kirov". He was tried together with Yugoslav communist leaders Filip Filipović and Antun Mavrak, both of whom were executed during the Great Purge. From November 1936 til May 1937, Štajner was confined in the NKVD prisons Lubyanka and Butyrka, and then submitted to the military court and confined in the Lefortovo Prison. In June 1937, he was found guilty by the military court and sentenced to ten years in prison. He was then transferred to the Solovki prison camp on the Solovetsky Islands, where he was held until August 1939. He was then transferred to the Nadezhda work camp near Dudinka in northern Siberia. There, he took part in the building of the railway and then in the building of the city of Norilsk. In 1943, Štajner was sentenced to ten more years in prison, plus five years of loss of rights. In 1948, after the Tito–Stalin split and the expulsion of the CPY from the Comintern, the NKVD asked him to testify against the Yugoslav leadership, which he refused. Shortly afterwards, he was transferred to Irkutsk, where he was held until 1949, and then to Bratsk, where he was held until September 1953. His 17-year prison term ended on 22 September 1953, six months after the death of Stalin. After being released from prison, Štajner was not allowed to return to Moscow, but was forced to live in exile in Siberia according to the 101st kilometre Law. While in exile, Štajner lived in Krasnoyarsk, Yeniseysk and Maklakovo between 1953 and 1956. There, he worked as a stonemason, and then as a factory worker.

In 1955, Yugoslavia and the Soviet Union resumed diplomatic relations. In June 1956, during an official visit to Soviet Union, Tito handed Khrushchev a list of 113 Yugoslav communists who had disappeared during the Great Purge, and asked about their fate. Khrushchev promised he would answer in two days, when he found out. Two days later, Khrushchev informed Tito that exactly one hundred of the persons on the list were dead by then. Then, the remaining thirteen were located by the KGB in Siberia, and eleven of them returned to Yugoslavia. Štajner was among them. Shortly before that, the Supreme Collegium of the Supreme Court of the USSR rehabilitated him. He traveled from Maklakovo to Moscow to meet his wife. Soon afterwards, they returned to Yugoslavia, which he considered his home country. He was issued an exit permit to leave the Soviet Union on 30 July 1956. After return to Yugoslavia he was awarded a state pension, and he spent the rest of his life living in Zagreb. He visited Soviet Union once more in 1966. On 24 April 1972, Štajner was welcomed by Josip Broz Tito at Vila Zagorje during Tito's stay in Zagreb. During this meeting, Štajner presented his book "Seven Thousand Days in Siberia" to Tito.

In June 1991, the Government of newly independent Croatia stripped Štajner (and many other communists) of the state pension. Štajner died on 1 April 1992, and was buried in Zagreb.

=== Family ===
Štajner married Russian woman Sonya Yefimovna in Moscow in 1935. At the time of his arrest, she was 20 years old, and in the ninth month of pregnancy. She gave birth to a girl named Lida, but the baby died at the age of two due to a cold and a further illness. During Štajner's time in prison, Sonya was humiliated, mocked, and tortured by the authorities, and was labeled "wife of an enemy of the people". She never repudiated her husband, and spent most of her time trying to help him. She was able to exchange a few letters with Štajner until 1940, but then did not hear from him for the next five years. Although she had suspected that her husband had been killed, she never remarried. In 1945, Štajner managed to reestablish contact with his wife through a woman who worked at the prison camp. The two met for the first time after almost 19 years in March 1955, when Sonya visited him in Maklakovo, where he had lived in exile. In 1956, they emigrated to Yugoslavia together where they lived for the rest of their lives. She died in Zagreb on 11 March 2005.

== Literary work ==
After his return to Yugoslavia, Štajner became an author and published three books about his arrest, trial, and experiences in Siberian gulags:

- "Seven Thousand Days in Siberia" (1971, Serbo-Croatian: "7000 dana u Sibiru")
- "Return from the Gulag" (1981, Serbo-Croatian: "Povratak iz Gulaga")
- "A Hand from the Grave " (1985, Serbo-Croatian: "Ruka iz groba") – a collection of interviews with Štajner, and texts about Štajner written by others.

His first book, "Seven Thousand Days in Siberia" was very popular in Yugoslavia, and was translated to German, French, English, Slovene and Czech, Esperanto (S.A.T., 1983). It was named "the book of the year" in 1972 by the Vjesnik newspapers, and Štajner was awarded the Ivan Goran Kovačić prize as the author of the book of the year. Štajner finished the manuscript for "Seven Thousand Days in Siberia" in 1958, but no publisher was able to publish it until 1971 because of political controversy. The copies of the manuscript he sent to the publishers in Zagreb and Belgrade disappeared without trace, but Štajner had already sent the original manuscript to his brother living in Lyon, France.

Štajner's life and work was a major inspiration for Danilo Kiš' book of stories A Tomb for Boris Davidovich, published in 1976. Kiš befriended Štajner and wrote an introduction to "Seven Thousand Days in Siberia". Kiš also wrote about Karlo and Sonya Štajner in his 1983 book of essays and interviews "Homo poeticus". Title of Štajner's book "A Hand from the Grave " comes from Miroslav Krleža who mentions Štajner in his "Diaries" and compares him to the biblical Lazarus who rises from the grave.

== See also ==
- Moscow Trials
- NKVD troika
- Varlam Shalamov
