= Mavrak =

Mavrak may refer to:

== People ==
- Antun Mavrak (1899-1938), Croatian revolutionary and secretary of the Communist Party of Yugoslavia from Aug. 1930 to April 1932
- Béla Mavrák (b. 1966), Hungarian tenor singer
- Darko Mavrak (b. 1969), Yugoslav footballer
