= Triša Kaclerović =

Serbian politician (1879–1964)

Triša Kaclerović Триша Кацлеровић
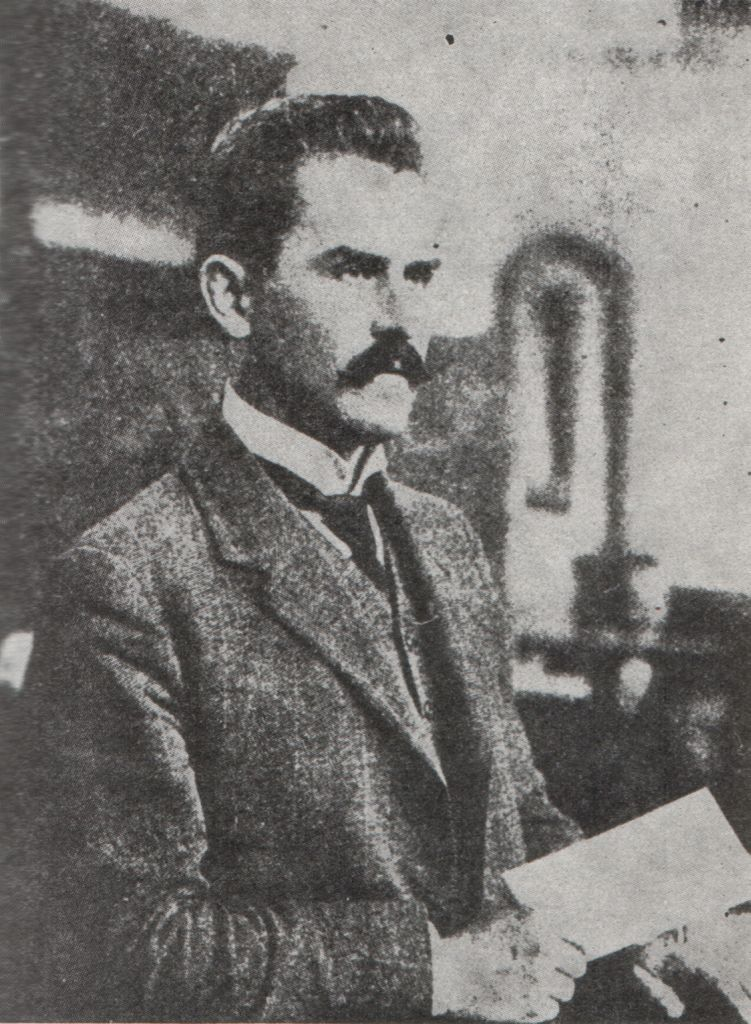

Secretary of the Central Council of the Communist Party of Yugoslavia
- In office 12 May 1923 – 22 May 1926
- Preceded by: Sima Marković
- Succeeded by: Sima Marković
- In office 3 June 1921 – 17 July 1922
- Preceded by: Filip Filipović and Sima Marković
- Succeeded by: Sima Marković

Personal details
- Born: 14 February 1879
- Died: 31 March 1964 (aged 85)
- Party: Communist Party of Yugoslavia

Trifun "Triša" Kaclerović (Serbian Cyrillic: Триша Кацлеровић; 14 February 1879 – 31 March 1964) was a Serbian politician, journalist and lawyer. He was one of the founders of the Serbian Social Democratic Party, and later a founder and Secretary General of the Communist Party of Yugoslavia.

== Biography ==
Kaclerović joined the socialist movement in the Kingdom of Serbia at a young age. On March 23, 1903, About 5,000 students and workers took part in demonstrations against the absolutist regime of Serbian King Aleksandar Obrenovic, organized by socialist students Dimitrije Tucović and Kaclerović. The rally ended in violence, with five people killed and six wounded in a clash with police in Belgrade. More than 120 demonstrators were arrested, 27 were indicted, and Tucović and Kaclerovic emigrated from the country.

Kaclerović was one of the founders of the Serbian Social Democratic Party and the Main Workers' Union. In cooperation with Dimitrije Tucović, he worked on the creation of a socialist federation of Balkan nations. He was elected MP twice. In 1908, when he was the only member of the Social Democratic Party in the Assembly, and in 1912, when Dragiša Lapčević was also a member of parliament. Kaclerović often interpreted the political moves of Pasic's radicals as "an order coming from Moscow".

On August 22, 1911, Užice Socialists convened a large workers 'assembly in due to non-compliance with the Law on Strikes, at which Triša Kaclerović spoke on behalf of the Main Party Administration and the Main Workers' Union.

Kaclerovic was one of the founders of the Socialist Workers' Party (Communist) in April 1919 and a member of the Central Party Council since September 1919. He was elected MP on the Communist Party of Yugoslavia list in November 1920. From the spring of 1921 he was in the leading party bodies of the CPY. In August 1921, he was the secretary of the then illegal Communist Party of Yugoslavia.

He was a member of the Central Committee, the legal, Independent Workers' Party of Yugoslavia ( 1923-1924). He was Delegate to the Fifth Congress of the Comintern in 1924. In 1928 withdrew from all political activities. Kaclerović was the only CPY secretary general to survive Great Purge of the 1930s.

After the establishment of the Socialist Federal Republic of Yugoslavia, he was a member of the Provisional National Assembly and served as a judge of the Supreme Court of the Federal People's Republic of Yugoslavia. Kaclerović retired in 1948 and died in 1964 in Belgrade.
