= Josip Kraš =

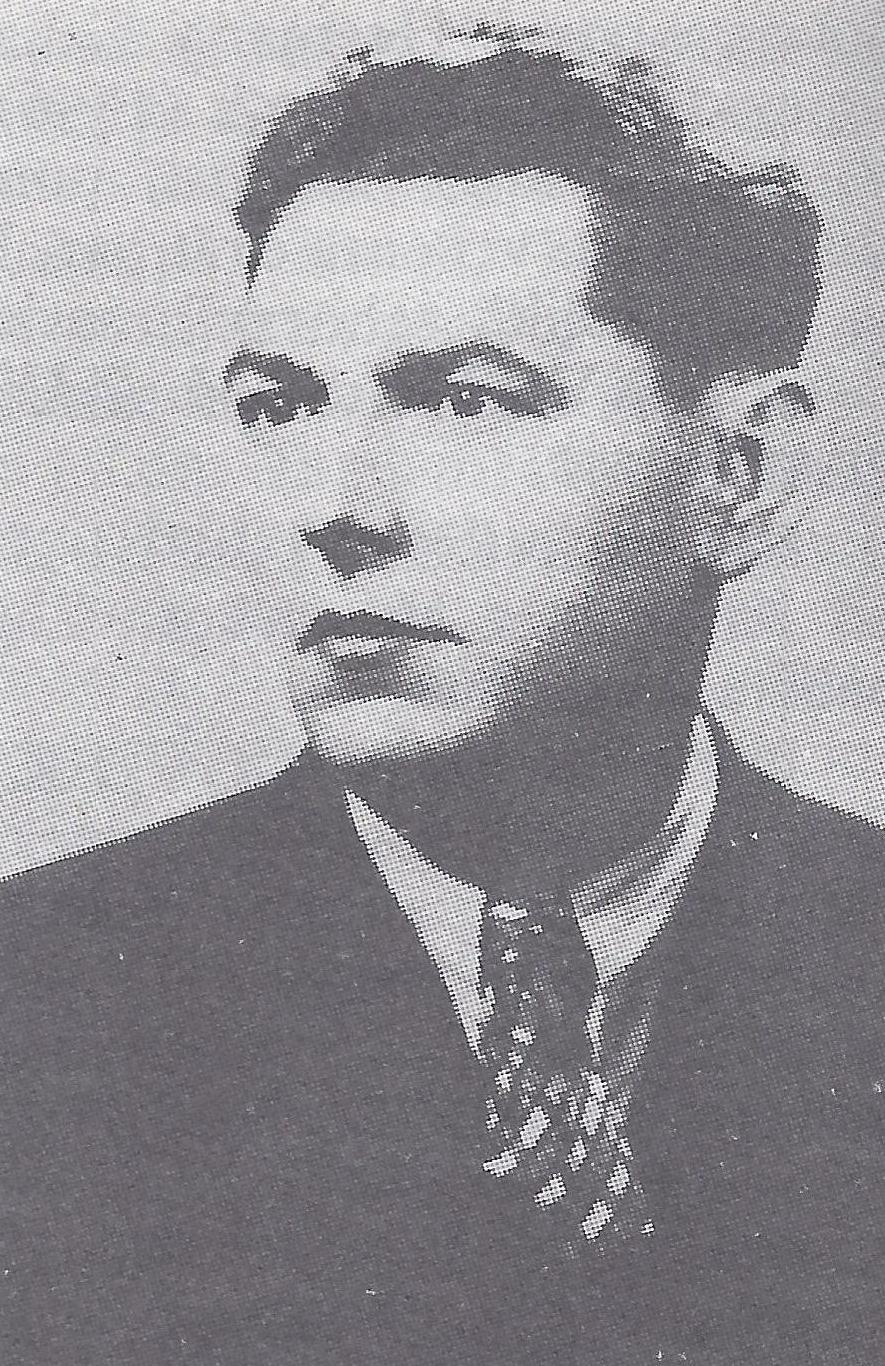
Josip Kraš

Josip Kraš (26 March 1900 – 18 October 1941) was a Croatian communist and partisan who died in World War II and was proclaimed a People's Hero of Yugoslavia.

Kraš was born in the village of Vuglovec (near Ivanec and Lepoglava) to a poor family of a miner Valent Kraš and his wife Bara (née Videc). He joined the workers' movement after World War I and became a trade union activist. In 1920 he was made one of the leaders of the League of Workers with Food and Water (lixae or živežari - salespeople in markets, workers in food storages, cooks, waiters, water workers).

In 1929, after the January 6 Dictatorship was proclaimed in the Kingdom of Yugoslavia, the State Court for the Protection of the State in Belgrade sentenced him to five years in prison, which he served in the Sremska Mitrovica prison. After he got out of prison, he was forced to live back home in Ivanec, and there he helped organize the miner strikes of 1936 and 1937, which resulted in higher salaries and better working conditions for the miners in the region.

Because of his political work, he was incarcerated eleven times up to 1940, and after that when Nazi Germany invaded Yugoslavia in 1941, he went underground. He was killed by Ustaše the same year in Karlovac, age 41, as one of the early organizers of the partisan units in the region.

Posthumously he was awarded the title of people's hero, and the municipality of Ivanec made his house in Vuglovec a memorial museum in 1965. The confectionery factory Kraš in Zagreb is named after him.
