= Biograd, Nevesinje =

Biograd Биоград
- Village
- Location within Bosnia and Herzegovina
- Coordinates: 43.184886°N 18.121342°E
- Country: Bosnia and Herzegovina
- Entity: Republika Srpska
- Municipality: Nevesinje
- Time zone: UTC+1 (CET)
  - Summer (DST): UTC+2 (CEST)

Biograd (Serbian Cyrillic: Биоград) is a village in the municipality of Nevesinje, Republika Srpska, Bosnia and Herzegovina.
