= Blagoje Parović =

Yugoslavian politician (1903–1937)

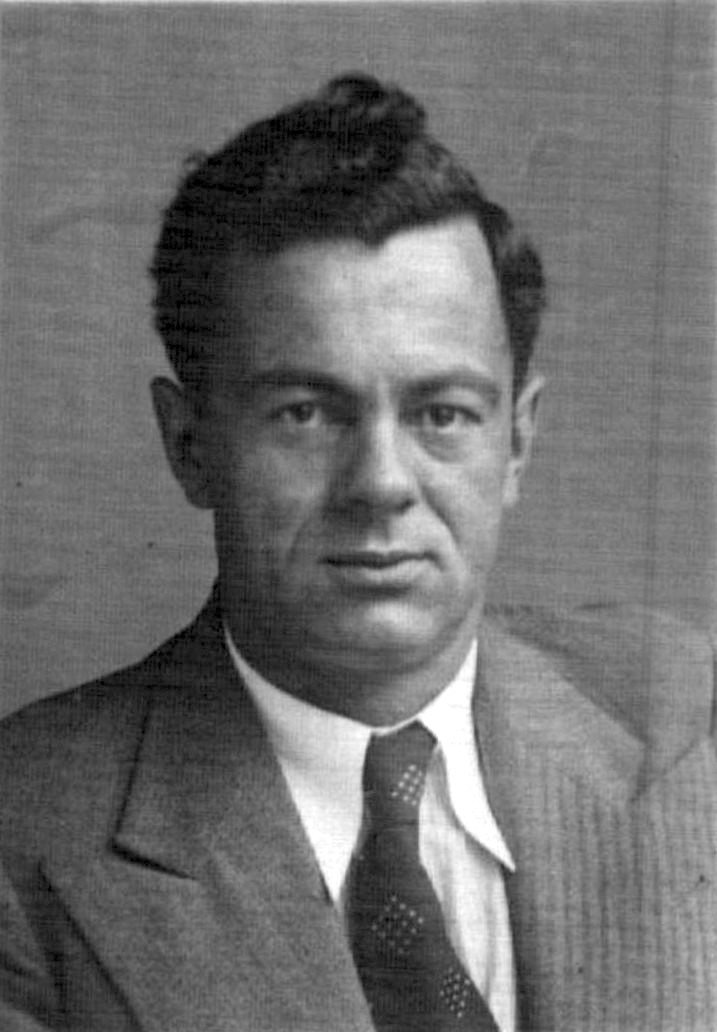
- Parović in Moscow in 1935
- Born: 25 March 1903; Biograd, Bosnia and Herzegovina, Austria-Hungary
- Died: 7 July 1937 (aged 34); Villanueva de la Cañada, Second Spanish Republic
- Military career
- Nickname: Šmit (nom de guerre)
- Conflicts: Spanish Civil War; Battle of Brunete †

Blagoje Parović (Serbian Cyrillic: Благоје Паровић; 25 March 1903 – 7 July 1937) was a member of the Central Committee of the Communist Party of Yugoslavia and served as a political commissar in the Spanish Civil War.

== Early life ==
Parović was born on 25 March 1903 in the village Biograd near Nevesinje. His parents Petar and Gospava were poor peasants. Both of his parents died in his early years. His mother died first while his father Petar was killed by soldiers of Austria-Hungary during the First World War. After death of his parents Parović went to Vinkovci where he was educated as shoemaker. His younger brother Rade was taken to Gradiška.

== Spanish Civil War ==
Parović was commissar of the XIII International Brigade during the Spanish Civil War. According to communist published works, Parović died on 7 July 1937 in the Battle of Brunete, heading his brigade during one assault toward well-defended enemy positions. Following the collapse of socialism, publicists such as Vladimir Dedijer began claiming that Parović was murdered by his own comrades, a claim which academic historiography dismisses as a conspiracy theory.

== Legacy ==
The central square in Nevesinje, his birth town, is named after Parović. Streets in Belgrade, the capital of Serbia, Novi Sad, the capital of Serbia's northern province Vojvodina, and Niš, the third largest city in the country, are named after Parović. Blagoje Parović street in Novi Sad was briefly renamed to "John Lenon street" in 2001, but the change was reverted in 2005.
