= Antun Mavrak =

Croatian revolutionary and Communist functionary

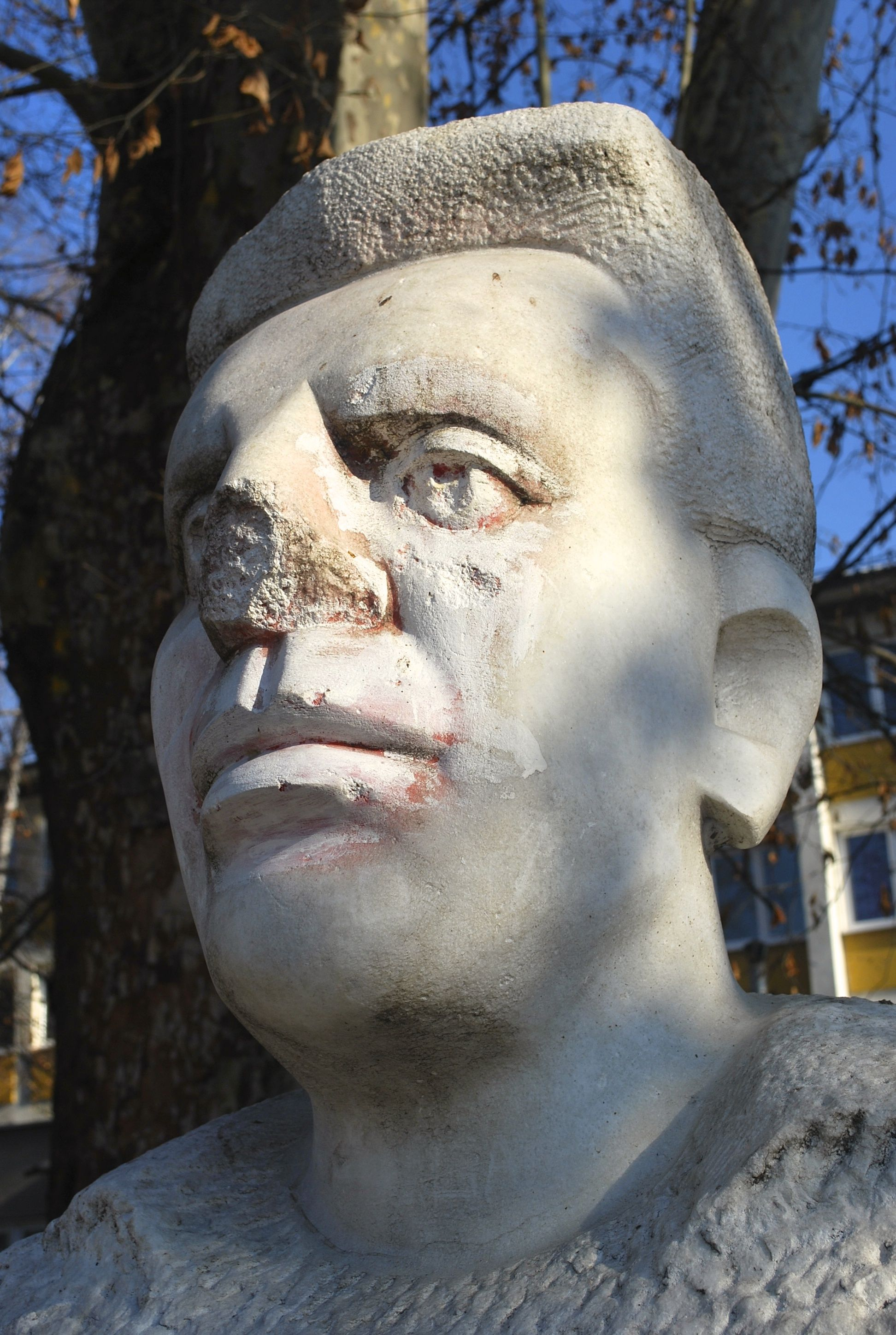
The bust of Antun Mavrak in Travnik.

Antun Mavrak (1899 – 8 April 1938) was a Croatian revolutionary and top functionary of the Communist Party of Yugoslavia (KPJ).

Mavrak was named as organizational secretary of the underground KPJ in August 1930 and remained in that leading post until his removal in December 1931. Although expelled from the Communist Party, Mavrak continued to live in the Soviet Union under the name Karl Yakovlevich, working as a laborer. Mavrak was arrested during the Terror of 1937-38 and was executed as an alleged spy in 1938.

Mavrak was posthumously rehabilitated by the Soviet government in 1963.

== Biography ==
=== Early years ===
Antun Mavrak was born in 1899 in Bosnia, then part of the Austro-Hungarian Empire to an ethnic Croatian family.

Following completion of his secondary education, Mavrak enrolled at the University of Zagreb, where he studied law.

=== Political career ===
Mavrak joined the Communist Party of Yugoslavia (KPJ) in 1924, soon coming to play a leading role in that organization. He was named secretary of the regional committee for Croatia in 1928 and was named a member of the party's delegation to the 6th World Congress of the Comintern held in Moscow that same year.

Mavrak's political activity as a member of the illegal Communist Party brought him to the attention of the Yugoslav police, who forced him to flee to Vienna, Austria to avoid arrest shortly after his return from Moscow. The Austrian government in turn sought Mavrak's removal and he was expelled from Vienna, landing in Paris, where he headed the organization of exiled Yugoslav Communists in France.

By the end of 1929 the leftist leaders of the Communist Party of Yugoslavia Filip Filipović and J. Martinović were the focus of severe criticism in Moscow. At issue was a perceived tendency of the underground Yugoslav party towards putschism at the expense of factory organization, with the first half of 1929 marked by a series of gun battles between KPJ insurgents and the police as party radicals vainly attempted to ignite a mass "armed uprising" via isolated street fighting. Moreover, sectarian infighting further destabilized the Yugoslav party organization as the ascendant ultra-revolutionary left wing moved towards "purging the party of all opportunist renegades."

With the KPJ shattered by their tactics and the inevitable reprisals of the Yugoslav government, the Comintern sought a new leadership to bring the factional war revolutionary posturing to an end and to set about rebuilding the organization. In August 1930, Mavrak was called to Moscow and was there named the new organizational secretary of the Communist Party of Yugoslavia.

A new focus was made on the organization of underground trade unions, while those seeking an immediate insurrection through armed battles were dismissed as terrorists in the party press. Mavrak proved a poor choice as a party leader, however, failing to appeal to the dominant left wing of the KPJ and alienating a large section of the party faithful by attempting to end publication of the party theoretical magazine Klasna borba (Class Struggle) as a "waste of time."

On 7 December1931, top officials of the KPJ met with relevant Comintern officials to determine a new leadership for the Yugoslav party, with Filip Filipović returned for a second stint as the leader of the party organization. Antun Mavrak's career as a top Communist Party official was thus essentially brought to a close.

=== Final years ===
Anton Mavrak was expelled from the Communist Party of Yugoslavia by Comintern decision in April 1932. He continued to live in the Soviet Union following his expulsion, assuming the new name Karl Yakovlevich, working in Rostov and Moscow as a laborer.

Mavrak was arrested early in 1938 as part of the secret police frenzy which swept the USSR — a mass anti-espionage campaign with xenophobic overtones in which former Communist dissidents were especially hard hit. Mavrak was tried along with fellow KPJ leaders Karlo Štajner and Filip Filipović and was executed immediately thereafter.

The Soviet government posthumously rehabilitated Mavrak in 1963, thereby essentially admitting that the charges made against him during the terror of 1937-38 were without basis.

== See also ==
- Đuro Đaković
