= Sima Marković =

Serbian mathematician and communist

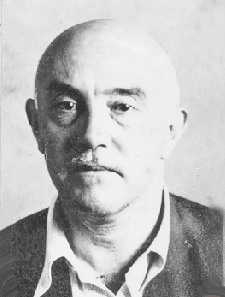

Political Secretary of the Central Committee of the Communist Party of Yugoslavia
- In office 22 May 1926 – 1 December 1927
- Preceded by: Triša Kaclerović
- Succeeded by: Đuro Cvijić
- In office 17 July 1922 – 12 May 1923
- Preceded by: Triša Kaclerović
- Succeeded by: Triša Kaclerović
- In office 24 June 1920 – 3 June 1921 Serving with Filip Filipović
- Preceded by: Živko Topalović
- Succeeded by: Triša Kaclerović

Personal details
- Born: 8 November 1888
- Died: 19 April 1939 (aged 50)
- Party: Communist Party of Yugoslavia

Sima Marković (8 November 1888 – 19 April 1939) was a Serbian mathematician, communist and socialist politician and philosopher, known as one of the founders and first leaders of the Communist Party of Yugoslavia.

== Biography ==
Marković was a doctor of mathematical sciences and a university professor. He has written many works in mathematics, philosophy, physics and politics.

He was an early activist and member of the Serbian Social Democratic Party in the Kingdom of Serbia, and since the unification of the Yugoslav communists in 1919 a member of the Communist Party of Yugoslavia.

Sima Marković advocated the preservation and peaceful reform of Yugoslavia into the republic, as opposed to the then position of the Comintern. He was killed in Stalinist purges in 1939 along with many other leading Yugoslav communists. He was rehabilitated on 10 June 1958 by a decision of the Supreme Court of the Soviet Union.
