= Social Democratic Party of Bosnia–Herzegovina (1909) =

Social Democratic Party Socijaldemokratska stranka Социјалдемократска странка
- Abbreviation: SDSBiH
- Leader: Sreten Jakšić
- Founded: 28 June 1909
- Dissolved: 20 April 1919
- Merged into: SRPJ(k)
- Newspaper: Glas Slobode
- Membership: c. 2.000
- Ideology: Marxism; Yugoslav unionism
- Political position: Left-wing
- International affiliation: Second International

The Social Democratic Party of Bosnia–Herzegovina (Serbo-Croatian: Socijaldemokratska stranka Bosne i Hercegovine / Социјалдемократска странка Босне и Херцеговине) was a left-wing Marxist political party, active in the Austro-Hungarian Condominium of Bosnia–Herzegovina.

The party was active from 1909 until 1919 when it merged into the Socialist Workers' Party of Yugoslavia (of Communists), the predecessor of the Communist Party of Yugoslavia (KPJ). The party was led by Sreten Jakšić.

== Sources ==
- Engelsfeld, Neda (1972). "Rad kluba komunističkih poslanika u plenumu Ustavotvorne skupštine (u prosincu 1920. i u siječnju 1921.)" [Work of the Communist Delegates' Club in the Constitutional Assembly (in December 1920 and January 1921)]. Radovi: Radovi Zavoda za hrvatsku povijest Filozofskoga fakulteta Sveučilišta u Zagrebu (in Croatian). 2 (1). Zagreb, Croatia: University of Zagreb: 181–262. ISSN 0353-295X.
- Trencsényi, Balázs; Janowski, Maciej; Baar, Monika; Falina, Maria; Kopecek, Michal (2016). A History of Modern Political Thought in East Central Europe: Volume I: Negotiating Modernity in the 'Long Nineteenth Century'. Oxford, UK: Oxford University Press. ISBN 9780191056956.
