= Filip Filipović (politician) =

Serbian politician (1878–1938)

- Филип Филиповић
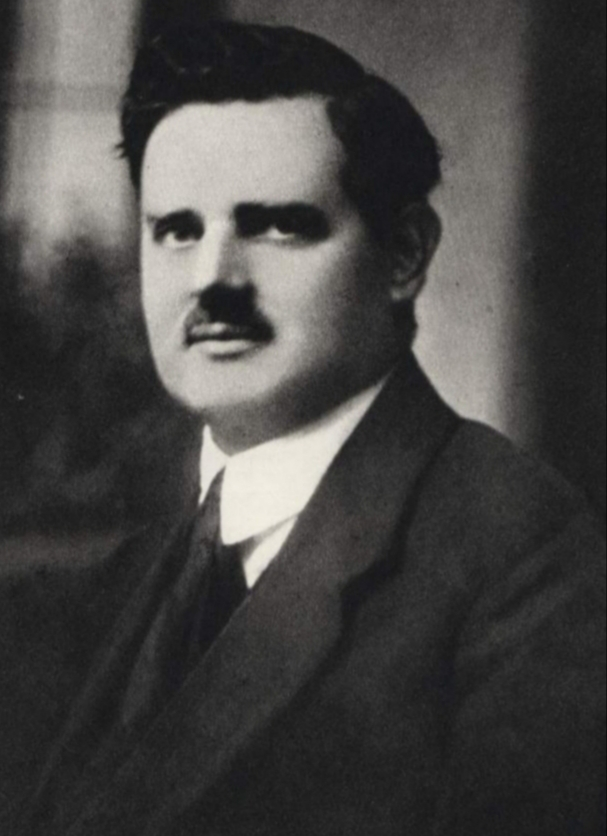

Political Secretary of the Central Committee of the Communist Party of Yugoslavia
- In office December 1931 – April 2, 1932
- Preceded by: Jovan Mališić
- Succeeded by: Miloš Marković
- In office April 23, 1919 – June 3, 1921 Serving with Živko Topalović (1919–20) and Sima Marković (1920–21)
- Preceded by: Position established
- Succeeded by: Triša Kaclerović

41st Mayor of Belgrade
- In office August 25, 1920 – September 3, 1920
- Preceded by: Kosta Jovanović
- Succeeded by: Đoka Kara-Jovanović

Personal details
- Born: June 21, 1878 Čačak, Principality of Serbia
- Died: April 1938 (aged 59) Moscow, Soviet Union
- Party: Communist Party of Yugoslavia
- Other political affiliations: Serbian Social Democratic Party, Communist Party of Soviet Union, Comintern
- Occupation: Professor and politician

Filip Filipović (Serbian Cyrillic: Филип Филиповић; June 21, 1878 – April 1938) was a Serbian mathematician, one of the founders of the Communist Party of Yugoslavia and its first secretary. He spent most of his last ten years in the Soviet Union, where he was executed during the Great Purge.

== Early years ==
Filip Filipović was born in Čačak on June 21, 1878. His father, Vasa Filipović, was a professor at the gymnasium in Čačak, where he taught mathematics, as well as German and French, and later was the director of a high school in Užice. Filip was one of seven children. His sisters Savka and Dara later belonged to the revolutionary labor movement, where they helped Filip in his political work.

Even as a high school student, under the influence of writers such as Svetozar Marković, he became interested in socialism. After graduating from high school, Filipović entered the Higher Technical School of Belgrade. In 1897 he began participating in the revolutionary movement and was a member of the socialist organization and the general workers' union in Belgrade, where he befriended Dragiša Lapčević.

Filipović began his mathematics studies in Belgrade and continued them at Saint Petersburg Imperial University in Russia. After graduating in 1904, he stayed in Russia and became a mathematics teacher at the Demidovsky Women's Trade School in Saint Petersburg, where he worked until 1912, while also teaching at other schools and in some folk and workers' schools after the 1905 Russian Revolution. He was interested in educational pedagogical problems and the improvement of teaching, co-authoring a text on the pedagogy of mathematics and participating in the First All-Russian Congress of Mathematics Teachers.

== The Russian Revolution of 1905 ==
During his studies in Saint Petersburg, Filipović joined the Russian labor movement, and in 1902 he was a participant in student demonstrations. He became a member of the Russian Social Democratic Labour Party in 1902 and later joined the Bolshevik faction within it. He participated in the work of Marxist circles, studying the works of Marx, Engels, Kautsky, Plekhanov and others while he participated in workers' demonstrations and other actions, as well as in the 1905 Russian Revolution, which had a bourgeois-democratic character. According to the directive of the Saint Petersburg Social Democratic Committee, in the fall of 1905 he was supposed to start working politically with the sailors of the Baltic Fleet in Kronstadt, but he was arrested in September of the same year as a result of a police raid on the Petrograd Committee. He was then imprisoned in the Kresty Prison in Saint Petersburg, but after a month he was released on October 17, 1905, due to the Manifesto of Tsar Nicholas.

During his vacation in Serbia in 1902, Filipović visited his family who lived in Užice at the time, where he got to know Dimitrije Tucović better; after his return to Russia he continued to maintain a constant relationship with him. At Tucović's invitation, Filipović began to collaborate in the newspaper "Radničke novine", of which Tucović was the editor, and from 1910 in the newspaper "Borba", which was the theoretical paper of the Serbian Social Democratic Party. His articles were mainly about the Russian revolutionary movement, the struggle of the proletariat in Russia, and the importance that the revolution of 1905 had for the awakening of the working masses, as well as about the "inquisitional" torture of revolutionaries.

== Serbia and Yugoslavia ==
At the invitation of Tucović, Filipović returned to the Kingdom of Serbia in 1912. He immediately got involved in political life, becoming a member of the Main Party Administration of the Serbian Social Democratic Party (SSDP) and secretary of the Chamber of Workers.

As the secretary of the Board of Directors of the Chamber of Labor in Belgrade, Filipović was elected at the session of the Board of Directors on February 13, 1912, replacing Tucović, who devoted himself to party tasks. After accepting the new position, he initially took care to win the trust of certain trade union officials, who were initially not in favor of him, because they saw him as a foreign man. Filipović quickly overcame the mistrust with his persistent work, activity and dedication to the implementation of numerous tasks, which protected the rights of workers. He strictly took care of the implementation of the Workplace Law, as well as the protection of vulnerable workers' rights. Some time later, he received an invitation from the Moscow newspaper "Pravda" to be its collaborator so that their readers could follow the events in the Balkans.

The beginning of the Balkan Wars temporarily interrupted the work of Filipović, because part of the personnel of the Serbian Social Democratic Party was mobilized into the army. Tucović was sent to the front in Macedonia, and a little later Filipović was also mobilized, but he remained in Belgrade, where he served as adjutant of the local command.

After the end of the wars, he again devoted himself to the labor movement and the renewal of party organizations. He was particularly active in the fight against violations of the Workplace Law, because some employers in the race for profit extended the working hours to 12, 14 and 16 hours, while wages were reduced, and for a time they were not even paid.

In June 1913, Filipović went to Russia again, where he visited the Hygiene Exhibition in Saint Petersburg. During his stay in Russia, he published two articles in the local labor press about events in the Balkans. After returning to Belgrade, in September he spoke at a large protest meeting in the Socialist People's Center in Slavija, where the workers adopted the "Resolution on the indivisibility of the Balkans and the need for peace". Although he was busy with work in the Chamber of Workers, he also attended meetings in other places in Serbia — in Smederevska Palanka, Jagodina, Leskovac and others.

== The First World War and internment ==
The beginning of the First World War in 1914 found Filipović as the secretary of the Chamber of Labor and a member of the editorial staff of Radničke novina, where he collaborated with other members of the party leadership, Dušan Popović, Triša Kaclerović, Pavlo Pavlović and Mihail Todorović. Even before the outbreak of war, the Serbian Social Democratic Party ("SSDP") remained faithful to its principles and positions, so its representatives in the National Assembly of the Kingdom of Serbia voted against war loans, and its leader Dimitrije Tucović presented all the horrors of war. Filipović spent the first year of the war in Belgrade, and after the fall of the capital in September 1915, together with the non-mobilized part of the SSDP leadership, he went to Jagodina by agreement.

However, Filipović together with Popović, went to Kruševac instead of Jagodina, where he was caught by the Austro-Hungarian occupation forces. Vasilije "Vasa" Eškićević, the official painter of the Serbian 1st Army, noted in his diary that Filipović said to him on 27.10.1915: "We are not going from here, we are socialists and will wait for the Germans". The implied expectation was that the occupation forces would show some leniency towards the members of the SSDP, as that was the only party in Europe which voted against a government issuing war bonds in 1914 and that this was preferable to the withdrawal with the rest of the army and the civilian refugees. At first he was arrested, but soon he was released, after which he lived for some time in occupied Belgrade. In 1916, expressing an internationalist and revolutionary attitude, he refused to cooperate with the occupier, after which he was arrested and taken to a prison camp in the town of Aschach an der Donau.

In the very difficult conditions of the camp, where hunger and scarcity reigned, Filipović gathered around him a group of social democrats from Serbia and, in order to pass the time with Sava Maksimović and Nikola Popović, he organized a foreign language course. Through the gathered group of social democrats, he led an agitation among the inmates against going to work, which the camp authorities forced the inmates to do. In November 1916, through the members of the Social Democratic Party of Austria, who worked in this prison camp, he managed to send a letter to Popović in Belgrade and asked him to advocate for his release from the camp through the Austrian Social Democrats. After this, Victor Adler, a prominent Austrian social democrat, managed to secure the release of Filipović and a group of social democrats from the camp.

== Transfer to Vienna ==
In the summer of 1917, Filipović and his fellow prisoners were transferred from the camp to Vienna, where they were confined. Here he also managed to find employment, but he had to report to the police every week.

Through his contacts with the left-wing Austrian socialist Franz Koritschoner he made contact with the community of emigre Bolsheviks in Vienna. Together with them Filipović founded an illegal organization in Vienna on December 12, 1917, which was considered part of the organization of the Russian Bolsheviks. He also connected with the Bosnian-Herzegovinian social democrat Sreten Jakšić, who came to Vienna several times in late 1917 and early 1918. Through Jakšić, he established cooperation with the newspaper "Voice of Freedom", which was published in Sarajevo as an organ of the Social Democratic Party of Bosnia and Herzegovina. In this newspaper, he published articles in which he expressed the views of the Bolsheviks on the national question, and in November 1917 he wrote an article on the third anniversary of the death of Dimitrije Tucović.

At the beginning of March 1918, a delegation of the Russian Red Cross came to Vienna and connected with the Bolshevik group, and Filipović significantly contributed to connecting this delegation with revolutionary-oriented members of the Austrian, Hungarian and Czech labor movements. The Bolshevik group and Filipović played a significant role in the founding of the Communist Party of Austria on November 3, 1918.

They then took part in the revolutionary events that took place in Vienna on November 11, 1918, the day the Republic of German Austria was proclaimed. After this, Filipović, together with other members of the Bolshevik group, spent some time in prison, and at the end of 1918 he was expelled from Austria. At the beginning of December, he arrived in Budapest, where he immediately connected with the Party of Communists in Hungary, as well as a strong group of Yugoslav communists returning from Soviet Russia. On December 18, 1918, Filipović reported to the Central Committee of the Russian Communist Party (Bolsheviks) about the creation of the organization of Yugoslav communists in Budapest, as well as the political situation in the labor movement of Yugoslavia and the plans for the establishment of the Communist Party.

== Founding of the Socialist Labor Party of Yugoslavia (Communists) ==
Finding himself in the center of political events, just before the outbreak of the Hungarian Revolution in March 1919, Filipović analyzed the political situation in Hungary and the Balkans in conversations with Bela Kun and other leaders of the Communist Party of Hungary. As initiatives for the unification of the Yugoslav proletariat had already begun to emerge, at the beginning of January 1919 he returned to the newly formed Kingdom of Serbs, Croats and Slovenes. First, he came to Zagreb, where, together with Dragiš Lapčević, as a delegate of SSDP, he attended the Conference of the Social Democratic Party of Croatia and Slavonia. From there, he began a tour of the country popularizing the October Revolution and talking with representatives of social democratic parties about unification into a new single party. He visited Sarajevo, Slavonski Brod and Ljubljana and was accompanied on this trip by Moša Pijade, a journalist from the newspaper Slobodna reč. Due to his intensive political activity, Filipović was constantly persecuted by the police, so he often operated under someone else's name using false documents.

In order to agree on the creation of a new unified party, a conference was held in Belgrade on March 28, 1919, at the initiative of the Serbian Social Democratic Party, with all the leaders of the Yugoslav Social Democratic parties. At the Conference, common positions and the procedure of the future unification congress were agreed, which was decided to be held in Slavonski Brod, but since the Government did not allow it under the pretext that it was a "war zone", the congress was held in Belgrade.

Based on the gained revolutionary experiences, Filipović led the unification of the Yugoslav labor movement. Analyzing the political situation in the country, his idea of uniting all left-wing groups into one party based on the principles of class struggle was accepted from which certain groups and individuals who would not fully accept the communist program would gradually fall away. Unlike Austria and Hungary, where organized communists immediately created communist parties, based on Filipović's idea, in Yugoslavia, at the Unification Congress in Belgrade from April 20 to 23, 1919, the Socialist Workers' Party of Yugoslavia (Communists) was founded as a political body, and the Central Trade Union Council of Yugoslavia as a trade union organization of the revolutionary proletariat. At the Congress, he was elected as a member of the Central Party Council, which appointed him as the first secretary of the CPV SRPJ(k) Executive Committee. In addition to Filipović, Živko Topalović, Sima Marković, Dušan Čekić, Jovo Jakšić, Mitar Trifunović Učo, Lazar Vukičević, Vlada Marković, Đuro Cvijić, Vladimir Ćopić and others were elected as members of the Central Party Council.

== First wave of repression ==
Following the revolutionary events in Russia and Hungary, the government of the newly formed Kingdom of Serbs, Croats and Slovenes was afraid of the organization of a revolutionary labor movement, so it attempted to hinder its functioning in every way. Just a few days after the "Unification Congress" on April 30, 1919, Filip Filipović was mobilized and taken to Thessaloniki via Zaječar and Skopje, and from there via Ohrid and Debar to Piškopeja, a remote village on the border with the Principality of Albania. He was in the Third Company of the First Battalion of the Tenth Regiment and stayed for two full months. Here he was completely cut off from all political events, getting information only from newspapers, which sometimes arrived with great delay. Also, here he received the news of the death of his only surviving brother Boško.

When he returned to Belgrade at the end of July 1919, Filipović continued his political activity. On July 21, 1919, a general strike of "proletarian solidarity" with the Soviet republics in Russia and Hungary was organized. The authorities tried to prevent this strike, but despite the ban, it took place in all major cities of Yugoslavia. At the workers' assemblies resolutions against foreign intervention in Soviet Russia and Soviet Hungary were adopted. This strike, as well as the unfavorable mood of the public, was used by the Government of Stojan Protić as an excuse not to send the Yugoslav Army to intervene in Hungary. On that day, Filipović spoke about the socialist revolution in Russia at the workers' assembly in Slavija in the Socialist People's Center.

In order to publicly compromise the leaders of the revolutionary labor and communist movement, the authorities of the Kingdom of Serbs, Croats and Slovenes arrested them on the charge that they were agents of Bela Kun and Moscow and that they were preparing a Bolshevik coup in Yugoslavia. First, in mid-July 1919, Sima Miljuš and Vladimir Ćopić were arrested in Zagreb, and then in early August, Sima Marković and Filipović were arrested in Belgrade. The trial against them was led by Colonel Vasović, who was the prosecutor at the Thessaloniki trial in 1917, and since the government's "crown witness" was Alfred Diamantstein, this case was named the "Diamantstein Affair". Due to the lack of evidence, as well as the formation of the new Government of Ljubomir Davidović in mid-August, as well as the collapse of the Hungarian revolution, all the accused were acquitted and released in November.

== Second Congress of the CPJ ==
Filipović showed particular interest in organizing Yugoslav communist youth. At the Founding Conference of the Union of Communist Youth of Yugoslavia (SKOJ) on October 10, 1919, in Zagreb, it was decided that this organization would be completely independent and that it would be in contact with the Socialist Workers' Party of Yugoslavia (Communists) (SRPJ(k)) through its delegates.

Having been politically seasoned by his association with the Bolsheviks, Filipović was one of the few party leaders who tried to convey Lenin's views on the role of youth in the revolutionary struggle to the other members of the Central Party Council. Since he viewed the youth as a reserve of the party, which must be trained for revolutionary work through independent political activity, he insisted on socialist upbringing and education of the youth. When preparations for the Second Congress of the SRPJ(k) were underway, there were more serious disagreements between the executive committee of the Central Party Council and the SKOJ leadership, and when the Regional Secretariat of the SKOJ for Croatia made a decision not to participate in the pre-election campaign for the municipal elections, Filip Filipović managed to convince SKOJ leaders not to oppose the party's leadership. His reputation and authority which he had established among these young communists prevailed at the Second Congress of SKOJ, held from June 10 to 14, 1920 in Belgrade, where he managed to convince the delegates of the Congress to give up voting for the Resolution, which demanded that the SRPJ(k) not participate in the elections for the Constituent Assembly.

Preparing for the Second Congress of the SRPJ(k), Filipović invested all his authority in the fight against the centralist trend in the labor movement and the party. His treatise "Party, Trade Unions and Soviets", published in Belgrade in the middle of 1920, was dedicated to this goal. The ideological and political struggle between the communists on the one hand and the social democrats and centrists on the other was fought at the Congress itself, held from June 20 to 24, 1920 in Vukovar. In the proposed program of the Party, Filipović presented the positions of the communists, whose basic lines were the struggle for the Soviet Republic of Yugoslavia; creation of the People's Red Army; expropriation and socialization of production and trade; labor protection; requisition of buildings and apartments; socialization of pharmacies, hospitals and sanatoriums; compulsory education of youth of both sexes; separation of church and state and cancellation of debts and exemption from taxes.

At the Vukovar Congress, held in 1920, he led the revolutionary current in the party. He started from the premise that capitalism had reached its imperialist stage of development and that they were in the epoch of the socialist revolution, from which he argued that the party should fight for the Soviet republic, which in practice meant the overthrow of the bourgeois state along with capitalism. He accepted participation in the elections for the bourgeois parliament only as a means of propagandizing the movement, exposing class contradictions and developing revolutionary forces, while maintaining a permanent link between the working masses and the Party in the parliament.

The revolutionary faction prevailed, a new program was adopted and the name of the party was changed to the Communist Party of Yugoslavia (KPJ). At this Congress, together with Simo Marković, he was elected as the secretary of the executive committee of the Central Party Council of the KPJ. He actively worked to propagate the ideas of socialism and to popularize and defend the revolutions in Hungary and Russia, for which he was arrested and prosecuted several times.

== Municipal elections ==
Still in the course of preparations for the second party congress, Filipović was elected president of the local party organization in Belgrade in March 1920. Since the municipal elections were approaching, he was highlighted as a candidate for the president of the Belgrade Municipality.

The government of the Kingdom of Serbs, Croats and Slovenes experienced the municipal elections as a test before the elections for the Constituent Assembly, so they were not held simultaneously in the entire country. First, in March, municipal elections were held in the territory that was under Austro-Hungarian rule: Slovenia, Croatia, Slavonia, Dalmatia, Vojvodina and Bosnia and Herzegovina, as well as in the territory of the former Kingdom of Montenegro, and then in August in the territory of the former Kingdom of Serbia. During the elections, various pressures were exerted on voters, blackmail and intimidation, theft of votes, falsification of votes by electoral committees appointed by old municipal administrations or police authorities, etc. For example, in the territory of Croatia, Slavonia and Vojvodina, voting was done publicly. However, in these elections, representatives from the list of the Socialist Workers' Party of Yugoslavia won a good result. The Communists won the majority in Zagreb, Karlovac and Slavonski Brod, and a good result was achieved in Osijek, Vukovar, Križevci, Virovitica and other municipalities.

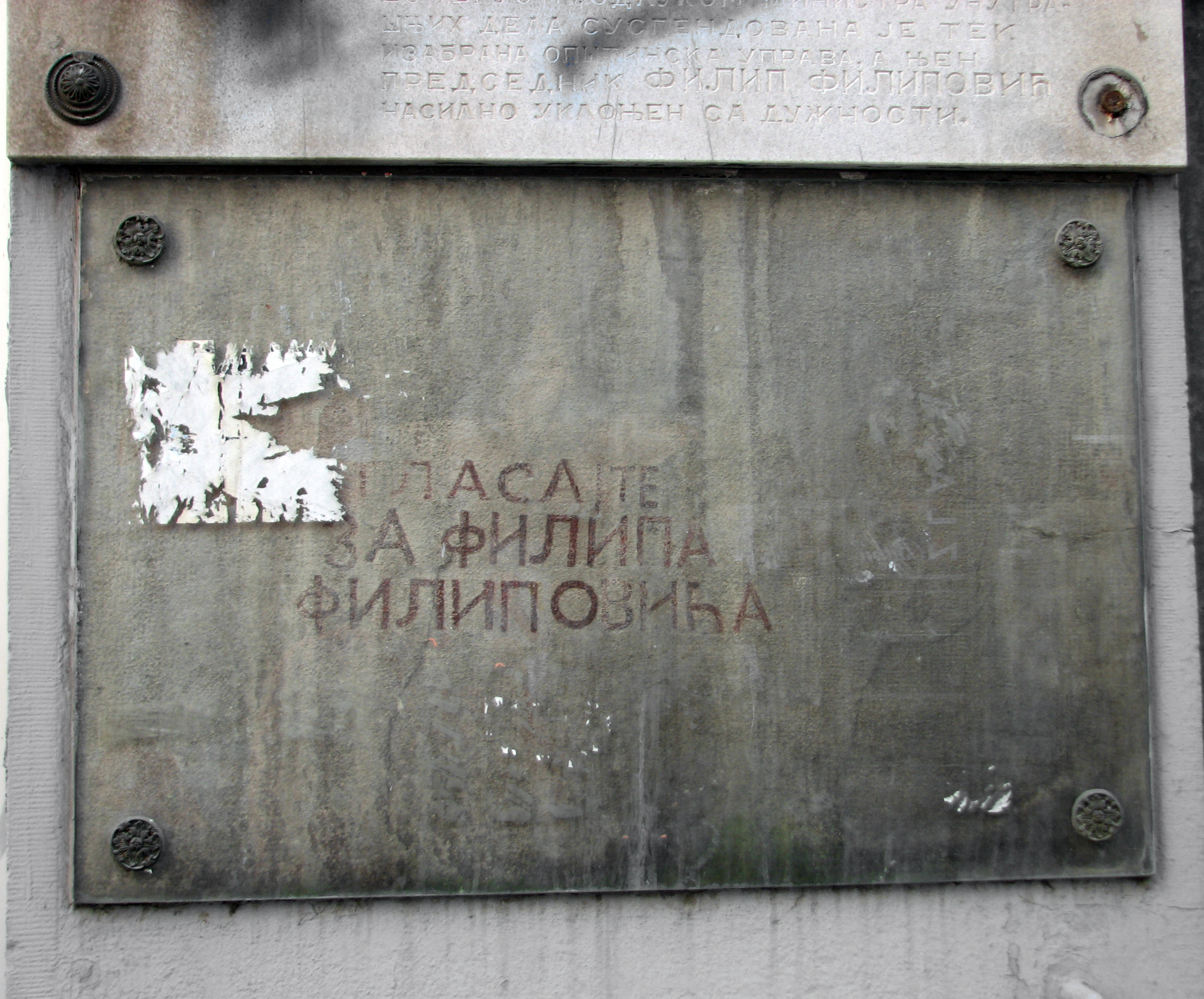
Preserved 1920 local elections slogan "Vote for Filip Filipović", written on a wall in Belgrade. Filip Filipović was elected mayor of Belgrade in 1920, but, refusing to pledge the oath to the King, he was not permitted to assume the office.

Since the communists won the most councilors in Zagreb, Svetozar Delić, president of the Club of Communist City Representatives of Zagreb, was elected mayor of Zagreb on April 15, 1920, with 27 out of 45 votes. However, the Provincial Government dismissed him and appointed his own commissioner, and then on April 26, annulled the oaths of the communist representatives and his election as mayor. Almost the same situation happened in Belgrade, after the elections held on August 22, 1920. In these elections, in addition to Belgrade, the communists achieved a good result and won the majority in Niš, Kragujevac, Valjevo, Pirot, Šabac, Leskovac, Užice, Ub, Đakovica, Kavadarci and Veles.

The pre-election activity of the communists in Belgrade was very lively — numerous gatherings and conferences were held, as well as other forms of propaganda work. Special activity was demonstrated by the party organization in Belgrade, with the help of the Central Party leadership. Filipović, who was a candidate for the president of the Belgrade municipality, appeared at gatherings in neighborhoods, trade union organizations, city neighborhoods and spoke everywhere emphasizing that the upcoming elections are extremely important for the working class. The final meeting of the communists was held on August 19, 1920, in Slavia in front of the Socialist People's Center, and in addition to Filipović, the president of the local organization of the KPJ for Belgrade, Aleksa Rebić, the secretary of the Labor Chamber, Mihailo Mika Todorović, journalists Kosta Novaković and Živko Jovanović, as well as and Draga Stefanović on behalf of women communists.

At the time of the municipal elections in 1920, Belgrade had about 30,000 voters, while only 13,500 voters were registered in the voter lists. A total of 10,435 people came out and voted, and the KPJ list received 3,628 votes. The list of KPJ proposed for the municipal administration had the following composition - president Filip Filipović, vice-president Mihailo Todorović and Živko Jovanović, Zdravko Todorović, Relja Đorđević, Vladimir Mirić, Aleksa Rebić, Mihailo Perović, Petar Cvetković, Jovan Davidovac, Janko Nikolić, Milan Prodanović and Stevan Marković. The Communists then got 30 councilors, some of whom were Pavle Pavlović, Sima Marković, Laza Stefanović, Kosta Novaković, Dragutin Bukvić, Miloš Trebinjac, Moša Pijade and others.

Early on election day, August 22, 1920, a large group of workers gathered in Slavija in front of the Socialist People's Center to whom Filipović announced the election results, after which a large procession began to gather from Slavija to Kalemegdan, and then went down to the square in front of the railway station, where Filipović and Pavle Pavlović addressed the crowd. Three days later, on August 25, the elected municipal councilors came collectively to the municipal building for their first session. Danilo Živaljević, the former vice president of the Belgrade Municipality, first read the election results, and then invited the newly elected councilors to take the oath. Before taking the oath, Pavle Pavlović declared on behalf of the communist councilors: "Our communist point of view on taking the oath is very well known. But invited to accept the municipal administration in the interest of the broad layers of the working people of Belgrade, we proceed to take the oath prescribed by law". After taking the oath, Vice President Živaljević announced that all the necessary formalities had been completed and invited the new President Filipović to take office.

The day after the first session, on August 26, 1920, the handover of the municipal administration was supposed to take place, but entry to the Belgrade Municipality building was blocked by the police. By order of the police, only Filipović, Todorović and selected counselors were allowed into the building, to whom the manager of the city of Belgrade, Manojlo Lazarević, announced the decision of the Minister of the Interior, Milorad Drašković, to suspend the newly elected municipal administration. In the act of suspension, it was stated that the new administration did not take the oath as required by the law, because councilor Pavle Pavlović made a statement that could have been considered as a disqualification from the oath.

The Minister of the Interior took on a heavy responsibility. By preventing the communist administration from entering the municipality, they violated a positive law and, perhaps, made a grave political mistake. The law was violated, because the communists fulfilled all the formalities required by the law. Their oath is valid and no fence before it, or after it, can legally invalidate it. How many notorious atheists were elected to similar positions in the world and took the oath even after their atheistic writings. Nowhere was an attempt made to invalidate their oath by their intimate conviction of oath and faith...

— part from the article "Act Mr. Drašković" published on August 28, 1920, in the newspaper "Politika"

== Elections for the Constituent Assembly ==
In 1914, parliamentary elections were called in the Kingdom of Serbia, which were supposed to be held in August, but the outbreak of the First World War prevented their holding. For these elections, Filip Filipović ran on the list of the Serbian Social Democratic Party for the Vranj district.

A few months after the municipal elections in 1920, the elections for the Constituent Assembly were held on November 28, 1920, in which the Communist Party of Yugoslavia finished third, after the Yugoslav Democratic Party and the People's Radical Party, winning almost 200,000 votes and 58 parliamentary seats. For these elections, Filipović ran on the list of the Serbian Social Democratic Party for the Vranj district. In the elections of 1920, Filipović again ran for deputy in the Vranje district and was elected in the electoral district of Pirot.

The Communist Party attached great importance to the elections for the Constituent Assembly, because it was supposed to decide on the form of the state and its internal organization by enacting the Constitution. Since the KPJ stood for the Soviet Republic of Yugoslavia, it developed a very lively pre-election activity, explaining its views on the organization of the state and highlighting its demands for the improvement of the social position of the working class and the poor peasantry. Fearing a good result of the communists, such as they achieved in the municipal elections, the government of the Kingdom of the Serbs, Croats and Slovenes in every way hindered the election preparations of the communists and their candidacy for deputies, so many were arrested. Filipović himself was arrested just before the elections.

After the election, Filipović had another obligation: work in the Communist Parliamentary Club, which was formed on November 29, 1920. At the end of 1920 and the beginning of 1921, Filipović was seriously ill, so in the spring of 1921 he had to go to Vienna for treatment, where he underwent surgery. He then stayed on the Croatian coast for recovery. Even though he was absent, he did not stop working in the leadership of the Communist Party, remaining one of its most prominent officials.

== Outlawing the party ==
The activity of the revolutionary labor movement and the Communist Party of Yugoslavia during 1920 was very noticeable. From April 15 to 29, there was a general strike of the railway workers of Yugoslavia, in which more than 50,000 railway employees participated. In order to prevent the strike, the Kingdom of the Serbs, Croats and Slovenes used the gendarmerie and the army, as well as other means to force the railway workers to return to work, and the strike was quelled at the end of April.

During this strike, there were many clashes between workers and the police, and in Subotica during the night of April 19–20. In April, there was an isolated armed rebellion, which was easily suppressed by the government. In Trbovlje, the miners partially took over power, to which the government responded with brutal terror, and in Ljubljana, on Zaloška Street, on April 24, the gendarmerie shot at the gathered workers, killing 14 and injuring 30. From September 2 to 15, a wave of peasant rebellions broke out in Bjelovar and its surroundings, which soon spread to the Varaždin and Zagreb counties, and the fiercest clash between the peasants and the authorities took place in the vicinity of Sisak, where the peasants demolished part of the railway. In these riots, 14 peasants were killed and 50 were wounded, while ten policemen and officials were killed.

7,000 miners embarked on a general strike in Bosnia and Herzegovina from December 21 through 29, 1920. The government tried to suppress the strike by force, evicting families of striking miners from state apartments, and miners from other parts of the country were exiled to their own regions. In the end, the government militarized mining workers, which led to conflicts between miners and the gendarmerie in some places. The fiercest clashes between miners and the police took place in Tuzla and its surroundings, where the so-called "Husino Rebellion" broke out, in which seven miners and peasants were killed and several dozen wounded.

After the good electoral results achieved by the communists in the municipal and parliamentary elections, as well as various labor strikes, during which there were often clashes with the gendarmerie, the government of the Kingdom of the Serbs, Croats and Slovenes feared the outbreak of a socialist revolution, like those that had broken out in Russia and Hungary. In order to prevent this, on December 29, 1921, the Minister of the Interior, Milorad Drašković, imposed a temporary ban on the work of the Communist Party of Yugoslavia until the adoption of the Constitution. This decision, known as the Obznana, banned any kind of communist organization and propaganda. This opened the period of the so-called "white terror" in Yugoslavia in which communists were arrested, workers' homes were closed, newspapers were banned, and archives of communist and trade union organizations were confiscated. Yet the Obznana did not have the authority of the law, so communists could only be arrested and detained, but not convicted.

After the adoption of the Obznana, the leadership of the Communist Party of Yugoslavia showed a certain hesitancy, which was not in accordance with their publicly expressed views. The leadership had the illusion that they would seek justice through the parliamentary system. This position was also supported by Filipović, who previously wrote that "the working class chooses the means of struggle according to the situation in which it is struggling". Unlike other leaders of the KPJ, Filipović, as an experienced revolutionary, predicted that the Party could come into sharp conflict with the regime, so he proposed to form an illegal leadership of the KPJ. During the discussion the club of communist deputies decided to enter into negotiations with the authorities instead of resistance in the streets. This caused confusion among the party members, so some criticized the leadership because there was no revolutionary action, while others became passive, and there were also individuals who decided on individual terror, as a form of struggle against the ruling regime.

After recovering from his illness, Filipović joined the parliamentary fight against the Obznana. At the session of the Constituent Assembly on June 11, 1921, on behalf of the Club of Communist Deputies, he made an extensive statement regarding the petition of the Communist Deputies dated June 5, in which it was requested to withdraw the Obznana, which illegally took away the right of free action of the KPJ; that all trade union organizations, as well as all workers' centers and socialist printing houses and bookstores, should be allowed to reopen immediately; and that all arrested persons, who were arrested on the basis of the Obznana, should be released. Since the assembly and the government ignored these demands, Filipović declared on the same day that in such conditions the survival and work of KPJ deputies in the Constituent Assembly became impossible and because of this they decided to leave the Constituent Assembly until the adoption of the Constitution.

== The regime's fight against the communists ==
After the adoption of the Obznana, a mostly younger section of the KPJ advocated a revolutionary struggle against the bourgeois regime of the Kingdom, and chose "individual terror" to launch it. In February 1921, the illegal organization Red Justice was founded in Zagreb, whose leadership consisted of Rudolf Hercigonja, Rodoljub Čolaković and Janko Mišić. After that, Rodoljub Čolaković formed the "Bijeljina group" in Bijeljina, which actively worked to plan the assassination of Drašković, the Minister of Internal Affairs and the author of the Obznana.

This was done without the knowledge and approval of the leadership of the Communist Party of Yugoslavia, which believed that the fight against the Obznana should be conducted legally in the parliament. At the same time, from June 22 to July 12, 1921, the Third Congress of the Comintern was held in Moscow, at which the decision was made to suspend all armed action at the time of the "undoubted ebb of the revolution", and that the main goal should be the struggle to create a "unique front of the working class".

At the beginning of March 1921, in Labin, in Istria, which was then part of the Kingdom of Italy, a great miners' strike broke out, during which the miners proclaimed the "Labin Republic", which had a great influence on the labor movement in Italy and Yugoslavia. This workers' rebellion was only suppressed after a month by the action of the Italian army.

Following these events in April, on the occasion of the anniversary of the "Subotica events", when an armed workers' rebellion broke out during the general strike of railway workers in Subotica, the authorities of the Kingdom of the Serbs, Croats and Slovenes, following these, there began to spread news in the regime press that in the event of a socialist revolution, Italian and Hungarian troops would enter Yugoslavia and tear it into pieces. Minister Drašković emphasized this in his presentation in the assembly, claiming that the KPJ program adopted at the Vukovar Congress and the draft Constitution of the Kingdom of the Serbs, Croats and Slovenes are mutually irreconcilable.

In mid-April, the police in Zagreb arrested a group of young communists for "communist activity". During the search, they found two revolvers and a bomb, which they used to accuse them or plotting the assassination of Milorad Drašković. These events were widely publicized by the government through the press, spearheading a campaign against the KPJ.

With the support of the authorities, a group of social democrats and centrists from Serbia and Bosnia and Herzegovina, who left the KPJ after the Second Congress, held a conference in Belgrade at the end of March at which the Socialist Workers' Party of Yugoslavia was formed. In May, centrists from Croatia joined this party, so it merged into the Socialist Party of Yugoslavia at the end of December.

At the end of May, the Government decided to allow trade unions to resume functioning, with the condition that the Ministry of Social Policy would control their operations, so that they do not fall into the hands of the communists again. Also, it was decided that the Workers' Centers in Belgrade, as well as the "Tucović" printing house, would be handed over to the newly founded Socialist Workers' Party. A few days later, the General Workers' Union was founded in Belgrade, the founders of which were prominent centrist trade union officials. In order to reduce the influence of the communists on the trade unions, the government assigned to this trade union the largest part of the previously confiscated property of the Central Workers' Trade Union Council. All these moves by the government were aimed at preventing the further work of the KPJ in every possible way.

== Arrest and Vidovdan trial ==
On May 3, 1921, Nikola Petrović, a student and member of the Crvena Pravda organization, made an unsuccessful attempt to assassinate Drašković in Belgrade, but this event did not attract much attention. Not long after, on June 29, 1920, after the adoption of the Constitution of the Kingdom of Serbs, Croats and Slovenes, Spasoja Stejić Baćo carried out an unsuccessful assassination attempt on the regent Alexander, throwing a bomb at the Regent's carriage only to watch it catch on the telephone wires and explode without hitting the target.

This assassination attempt on the Regent, like the previous assassination attempt on Drašković, led to a political showdown with the communists. At the session of the Assembly on June 30, 1920, KPJ deputies distanced themselves from this assassination, denying any connection with its execution, but even so, the Minister of Justice Marko Đuričić demanded that the communist deputies Filipović, Ćopić and Nikola Kovačević, as the alleged organizers of the assassination, be handed over to the court. A few days later, on July 1, 1921, the parliamentary immunity of the communist deputies was revoked and they were arrested on the same day and imprisoned in the Belgrade City Administration prison known as Glavnjača.

Just 20 days after Filipović's arrest, Alija Alijagić, a member of the Crvena pravda organization, shot and killed Drašković in Delnice on July 21, 1921. The authorities used this event for a definitive confrontation with the Communist Party, so on August 1, 1921, the National Assembly passed the "Law on the Protection of Public Safety and Order in the State", known as the "Law on the Protection of the State". This law banned the Communist Party of Yugoslavia, its deputies were excluded from the assembly, and the members of the KPJ Executive Committee were arrested and handed over to the Court, under the pretext that they were responsible for the assassination attempts and murder of Drašković and the preparation of the "Bolshevik revolution".

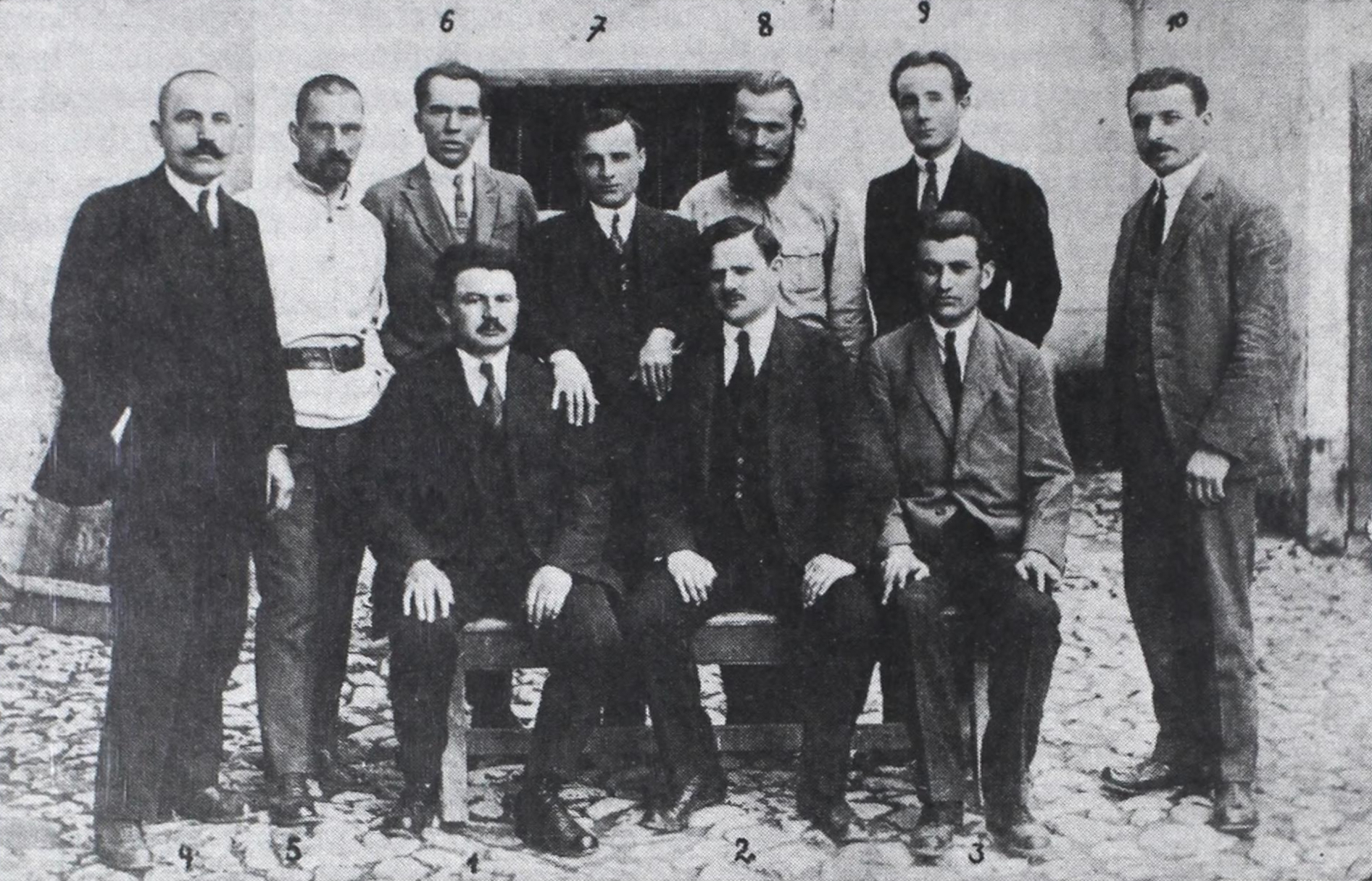
Members of the leadership and former members of parliament from the Communist Party of Yugoslavia in the prison in Požarevac in 1922. Filipović is seated in the middle.

After seven months of investigation, on January 25, 1922, the trial, the so-called "Vidovdan trial", began before the District Court of First Instance in Belgrade against 33 accused communists for the assassination of King Alexander on June 29, 1921. On the dock were 10 communist deputies and five members of the KPJ Executive Committee, among whom, in addition to Filipović, were Nikola Kovačević, Vladimir Ćopić, Miloš Trebinjac, Vladimir Mirić, Dragomir Marjanović, Lazar Stefanović, Ivan Čolović, Života Milojković and Đuro Salaj, while Sima Marković and Pavlo Pavlović were tried in absentia. The accused communists were defended at the trial by lawyers Triša Kaclerović, Rajko Jovanović, Dragiša Vasić, Milorad Pantović and others.

The hearing of Filipović before the court began on January 28 and lasted until February 18. During his presentation in court, he accused the investigating authorities for the treatment of the prisoners, who were beaten and mistreated, as well as for the inhumane conditions in Glavnjača. Although during the trial, the court failed to prove the connection between the head of the KPJ and the assassin Spasoj Stejić, on February 23, 1922, they were sentenced to two years in prison each. The assassin Stejić was then sentenced to death, which was later commuted to 20 years in prison.

After the sentencing, weakened by the poor conditions in Glavnjača, Filipović fell ill again and was treated for some time in a hospital in Belgrade. He spent most of his imprisonment until March 1923 in the prison in Sremska Mitrovica, and spent the rest of the six months in the prison in Požarevac.

During his stay in prison, he completed his study "The Development of Society in the Mirror of Historical Materialism", which was the basic literature for the Marxist education of the generations of Yugoslav communists in the interwar period. In addition to the theoretical introduction to the Marxist laws of the development of human society, the book introduced the readers to the significance of the socialist transformation in Russia and the prospects for the further struggle of the working class. This work remains a significant achievement in Marxist literature and a kind of testimony to the level of Marxist thought and ideological direction of the author, as well as the first generation of Yugoslav communists. It was printed in 1924 by Geta Kon, and Filipović dedicated it to his comrades Dimitrije Tucović and Dušan Popović, who died early.

== Continuation of political work ==
Filipović was released from the Požarevac prison on September 3, 1923, together with Ćopić and Kovačević. When leaving the prison, they were met by a group of workers from Požarevac, and then they all went together to the cemetery to the grave of the prominent socialist tribune Vasa Pelagić. There were spontaneous demonstrations against the regime at the grave, so the gendarmes used it as an opportunity to arrest Filipović, Ćopić and Kovačević, and they spent two more days in prison, after which they were released.

Upon arrival in Belgrade, at the Sava Pier, Filipović and his companions were greeted by crowds, but also by the gendarmerie, who immediately escorted Kovačević and Ćopić to the train station in order to travel to their hometowns, which were designated as their place of residence. Filipović, together with his sister Dara, took a taxi from the pier in the direction of Kalemegdan, while the gathered citizens and workers greeted him along the street. In Knez Mihailova Street, a throng of people also gathered to greet Filipović. They asked for Filipović to address them, but the policemen did not allow it. All the way to Filipović's house in Takovska Street, along the streets he passed there was crowds of people who greeted him. The welcome of Filipović, as well as his friends, was organized by an illegal party organization in Belgrade, especially Rajko Jovanović, Moša Pijade, Bora Prodanović and others. The same evening, the police arrested about 60 people, including the organizers of the reception, who spent three weeks in custody.

After leaving prison, Filipović dedicated himself to political work. First, he was elected president of the Central Committee of Red Aid, an organization that dealt with providing assistance to political prisoners and their families by providing legal, material, health and other assistance. During his stay in prison, the Central Party Council of the KPJ made a decision at the end of December 1922 to form the Independent Workers' Party of Yugoslavia (NRPJ), a legal party that, after the banning of the Communist Party of Yugoslavia, could participate in political life without hindrance.

The founding session of this party was held on January 13, 1923, in Belgrade. In the new party, Filipović was elected president of the Central Committee, and later became the editor-in-chief of the Marxist magazine "Borba". Also, in August 1923, during the municipal elections, the Belgrade NRPJ committee nominated Filipović for the position of municipal president and appointed him as the list holder. As a result of the interference of the regime, as well as the fact that Filipović could not participate in the election campaign, the NRPJ list won only 1,537 votes in the elections held on August 19, 1923.

In October 1923, in Zagreb, he participated with August Cesarec and other left-leaning writers and publicists in founding the newspaper "Književna republika", which was a monthly for cultural issues, whose editor was Miroslav Krleža. This paper was published for four years, but was often banned and in 1927 it was outlawed.

In January 1924, he participated in the Third National Conference of the KPJ, held from January 1 to 4 in Belgrade. At this Conference, the organizational problems of the party were mainly discussed, but also the national issue, which caused a rift between the "right faction", which believed that there are three nations in Yugoslavia and that the KPJ should not deal with the national issue, and the "left faction", which believed that the Greater Serbian bourgeoisie was oppressing the other Yugoslav peoples, including the Serbian people themselves. The "Left faction" won the Conference, so the Resolution on the National Question, authored by Đura Cvijić, was adopted and a new leadership led by Triša Kaclerović was elected.

Filipović did not belong to either the "left" or "right" faction, but due to his great reputation in the KPJ, he was elected secretary of the Central Party Council. He paid great attention to the political education of KPJ members, so at the beginning of 1924 he participated in the organization of a party school in Belgrade, where he gave lectures. At the commemoration held on the occasion of the death of Vladimir Lenin, on January 23, 1924, he presented a paper on Lenin's life. He actively participated in the organization of the May Day celebration in Belgrade, which was held in Košutnjak and Topčider, and which was attended by about 5,000 workers. On the way back to Belgrade, a large workers' assembly was held in Karađorđev Park, where Filipović spoke.

In the May issue for 1924, he wrote five articles: "On the Party and the Trade Unions", "On Leninism", "The Law on State Protection and Social Policy", "The Workers' and Peasants' Alliance" and "The Workers' Press and its Revolutionary Struggle". In May 1924, he spoke at a large student assembly, which was held because of the murder of a female student in Zagreb. At the end of the same month, he gave a lecture "Knowledge — a weapon of class struggle" in Vračar, and then he participated in the Conference of leather and processing workers, where he spoke about labor legislation.

== Political exile ==
At the beginning of June 1924, in agreement with the KPJ leadership, Filipović left Belgrade and went to Zagreb, from where he illegally transferred to Austria. After that, he went to the Soviet Union to attend the Fifth Congress of the Communist International, which was held in Moscow from June 17 to July 8, 1924. Since he was under police surveillance after his release from prison, Filipović cited going to Slovenia on vacation as the reason for his trip from Belgrade. However, not long after his departure, police agents searched his house in Takovska Street, as well as the house where his sister lived. During the Fifth Congress of the Comintern, Filipović was elected to the executive committee of the Comintern, and during the Congress he spoke on behalf of the Communist Party of Yugoslavia, the Communist Party of Bulgaria, the Communist Party of Greece, the Communist Party of Romania and the Communist Party of Turkey and stated that in the Balkans it is necessary to work on the creation of worker-peasant alliances.

After arriving in Moscow, Filipović first worked in the Red Peasant International, and in March 1926 he was elected a member of the Presidency of the Balkan Communist Conference, whose center was located in Vienna. During his stay in Vienna, where at that time part of the leadership of the Communist Party of Yugoslavia was also located, Filipović, as an experienced political worker with expert knowledge concerning the situation in the KPJ, assisted the work of its leadership.

He was elected to the highest bodies of the KPJ, but he also dealt with the problems of other Balkan and Central European communist parties. He actively participated in the preparation of the Third Congress of the KPJ, which was held in Vienna in May 1926, and during the Congress he was elected to the Presidency of the Congress, as well as a member of the Central Committee. He also participated in the Fourth Congress of the KPJ, held in November 1928 in Dresden, where he submitted two papers: "On the political situation and tasks of the party" and "On intra-party relations". Meanwhile, at the Sixth Congress of the Comintern, held in the period June–September 1928, he was re-elected as a member of the executive committee of the Comintern.

During his stay in Moscow, Filipović was engaged in theoretical work, and in the newspaper "Communistki International", which was an organ of the Comintern, he wrote small studies on the situation in the KPJ, from its foundation until then. By decision of the Politburo of the Central Committee of the KPJ, he was the responsible editor of the theoretical magazine "Class Struggle", which was published from 1926 to 1929, as a newspaper of the KPJ. In this newspaper, he expressed his observations about the good and bad sides of the KPJ's work, and in particular he fought against factional struggles, which weakened the work and strength of the KPJ. He published works and articles under various pseudonyms, the most famous of which are Bošković and Karić, but also the lesser known M. Moravac.

During his exile, Filipović came to Yugoslavia three times. The first time he came at the end of January and the beginning of February 1926, and the second time at the end of 1927. Then, as a representative of the Balkan Communist Federation, he attended the Fourth Plenum of the CPJ Central Committee, held from November 27 to 30 in Zagreb. His third visit to the country was in 1928, when he stayed from July to the end of September. As a member of the executive committee of the Comintern, he then participated in the sessions of the Politburo of the Central Committee of the KPJ, monitoring the implementation of the "Open Letter", which the Comintern sent to the members of the KPJ with the aim of suppressing "factional struggles". During his stay in Zagreb, where the leadership of the KPJ was then located, Filipović met the organizational secretary of the KPJ Local Committee for Zagreb, Josip Broz Tito.

After returning to Moscow, from 1929 to 1931 he was a member of the Central Committee of the KPJ and together with Paja Marganović and other prominent party officials of the KPJ worked to fix the situation in the KPJ, advocating that the party be led by cadres located in Yugoslavia. After the "Six-Year Dictatorship" of King Alexander began in 1929, during which a large number of leading members of the KPJ and SKOJ were arrested and killed, in 1930 the Comintern appointed Filipović to the head of the Central Governing Body of the KPJ with the task of helping party cadres in solving numerous problems and ensure the further work of party organizations. He held this position from the fall of 1930 until the spring of 1932, when he returned to Moscow from Vienna.

== Death ==
In 1932, the Commission of the Comintern, as well as the Control and Central Control Commission, in connection with the purge and verification of certain members of the Communist Party of Yugoslavia, made a decision that Filipović was considered a "verified member, but that his further use in political work in Yugoslav affairs, inexpedient". Although in June 1933 the Political Secretariat of the Comintern revoked this decision banning political work in Yugoslav affairs, Filipović never returned to political duties.

After returning to Moscow in April 1932, he worked as a clerk at the International Agrarian Institute, as well as in certain bodies of the Comintern. He experienced a certain kind of political rehabilitation in mid-1934 when he was approved to work as an assistant professor at the Department of Leninism at the Communist University of National Minorities of the West (KUNMZ). At the end of the same year, Filipović requested admission to the All-Union Society of Old Bolsheviks, which was founded in 1922. The conditions for admission to this society were very strict and a member could only be a member of the Russian Communist Party (Bolsheviks) before the October Revolution, and a recommendation from three members of the society was also required. When applying for admission to the Society of Old Bolsheviks, Filipović attached the recommendation of several former members, among whom were the revolutionaries Karl Daniševski and Yekaterina Gvozdikova-Frumkina, as well as letters of support from Bela Kun and Grgur Vujović. He was accepted as a member of the society on February 4, 1935, and during July and August of the same year, as a member of the KPJ delegation, he attended the Seventh Congress of the Comintern. After retiring from political life, Filipović engaged in scientific and journalistic work. He wrote for party papers and magazines, and in 1936 he published the work Balkans and International Imperialism.

In 1936, the General Secretary of the Central Committee of the SKP(b), Joseph Stalin initiated the Great Purge of cadres in the Communist Party, during which his political opponents were killed, first of all the old Bolsheviks who had achieved a great reputation in the party. This purge, followed by arrests, persecution, staged trials and other terror, lasted until the end of 1938, and during it a certain number of prominent Yugoslav communists who were staying in Moscow during those years were killed, among them Kosta Novaković, Sima Marković, Đuro Cvijić, Vladimir Ćopić, Rade Vujović, Kamilo Horvatin and others.

Filip Filipović was among those arrested on February 7, 1938. His arrest surprised most Yugoslav communists, as well as his acquaintances, given that he was never a "Trotskyist" nor did he belong to "factional groups within the KPJ" and always followed the political line of the Comintern. According to some opinions, the reason for Filipović's arrest could have been his resentment over the arrest and execution of old Bolsheviks such as Grigory Zinoviev and Nikolai Bukharin. Most likely, another arrestee reported him to the Main Political Administration of the People's Commissariat of Internal Affairs (NKVD).

He was sentenced to death on April 8 of the same year on the charge of being a "participant of Trotskyist-sabotage terrorist organizations and engaged in Trotskyist propaganda" and then executed, most likely in the same month. At the Twentieth Congress of the CPSU, held in February 1956, the new leader of the Soviet Union, Nikita Khrushchev, condemned the glorification of the cult of Stalin's personality, as well as the reprisals carried out during the Great Purge. After the Congress, mass rehabilitation of the convicted began, during which on October 3, 1957, by decision of the Military Collegium of the Supreme Court of the Soviet Union, Filip Filipović was also rehabilitated.

== Legacy ==
In his Report at the gathering on the occasion of the fortieth anniversary of the Communist Party of Yugoslavia, held in 1959, KPJ General Secretary Josip Broz Tito gave recognition and gratitude to Filip Filipović on behalf of Yugoslav communists, and Tito also spoke about Filipović and other victims of Stalin's purges at the Ninth SKJ Congress in March 1969. In 1978, on the occasion of the 100th anniversary of Filipović's birth, a scholarly conference "Revolutionary thought and work of Filip Filipović" was held. At the meeting, which was opened by the president of the Central Committee of the SKS, Tihomir Vlaškalić, 47 reports were submitted on the life and revolutionary path and work of the founder and first secretary of the KPJ. In addition to academics from Yugoslavia, scholars from Hungary, Romania, the Soviet Union and Austria also participated. In 1983, the Institute for Contemporary History published a collection of papers on Filip Filipović with the subtitle "Revolutionary Thought and Work".

In 1980, director Miloš Radivojević shot the film Dreams, Life, Death of Filip Filipović, which presented the story of the life and dreams of Filip Filipović. Filipović was played by the actor Aleksandar Berček, and in addition to him, Milena Dravić, Rade Marković, Milan Erak, Drago Čumić and others appeared in the film.

Around 20 streets in the Republic of Serbia bear the name of Filip Filipović today, including two primary schools in Belgrade and Čačak. There are memorial busts of Filip Filipović in the yard of both elementary schools. The elementary school in Niš bore his name from its foundation in 1989 until 2003, when its name was changed to Elementary School "Duško Radović".

== Sources ==
- Damjanović, Pero (1959). "Filip Filipović — fragmenti za biografiju" (PDF). mgb.org.rs. Muzej grada Beograda. pp. 167–218. Archived from the original (PDF) on 15 March 2021.
- Jakovljević, Milutin; Đoković, Milan (1979). Filip Filipović : životni put i revolucionarno delo. Gornji Milanovac : Dečje novine.
- Cvetković, Slavoljub (1988). "On the occasion of the fiftieth anniversary of the death of Filip Filipović (1878—1938)" (PDF). mbg.org.rs. Museum of the City of Belgrade. pp. 95–100. Archived from the original (PDF) on 4 February 2021.
- Požar, Petar (1989). Jugosloveni žrtve Staljinskih čistki. Nova Knjiga. ISBN 86-7335-060-3.
- Bilandžić, Dušan; Blečić, Zivorad, eds. (1980). Hronologija radničkog pokreta i SKJ 1919-1979. Institut za savremenu istoriju.
