= Presidency of the 9th Congress of the League of Communists of Yugoslavia =

9th Presidency
- Emblem of the League of Communists of Yugoslavia

15 March 1969 – 30 May 1974 (5 years, 76 days) Overview
- Type: Political organ
- Election: 9th Congress

Members
- Total: 62 members
- Newcomers: 35 members (9th)
- Old: 11 members (8th)
- Reelected: 15 members (10th)
- By-elected: 16 members (9th)

This electoral term of the presidency was elected by the 9th Congress of the League of Communists of Yugoslavia in 1969, and was in session until the gathering of the 10th Congress in 1974. At its 1st Session, the Presidency established the Executive Bureau, which consisted ex officio of the president of the Party Central Committee, two representatives from each republic and one representative from each autonomous province.

== Composition ==
=== Elected ===
Members of the Presidency of the 9th Congress of the League of Communists of Yugoslavia
Name	8th PRE	10th PRE	Birth	PM	Death	Branch	Nationality	Gender	Ref.
Krsta Avramović	New	Not	1928	1946	2013	Serbia	Serb	Male	
Vladimir Bakarić	Old	Elected	1912	1933	1983	Croatia	Croat	Male	
Milutin Baltić	By-election	Not	1920	1940	2013	Croatia	Serb	Male	
Dimče Belovski	New	Not	1923	1943	2010	Macedonia	Macedonian	Male	
Srećko Bijelić	New	Removed	1930	1948	2004	Croatia	Serb	Male	
Jure Bilić	By-election	Elected	1922	1941	2006	Croatia	Croat	Male	
Jakov Blažević	Old	Removed	1912	1928	1996	Croatia	Croat	Male	
Branko Borojević	New	Removed	1919	1941	1982	Yugoslav People's Army	Serb	Male	
Krste Crvenkovski	Old	Removed	1921	1939	2001	Macedonia	Macedonian	Male	
Dobroslav Ćulafić	New	Not	1926	1944	2011	Montenegro	Montenegrin	Male	
Josip Deželjin	By-election	Not	?	?	?	Croatia	Croat	Male	
Nijaz Dizdarević	New	Removed	1920	1942	1989	Bosnia-Herzegovina	Muslim	Male	
Emin Dobardžić	New	Removed	1930	1957	2009	Montenegro	Montenegrin	Male	
Stane Dolanc	New	Elected	1925	1944	1999	Slovenia	Slovene	Male	
Ivan Dolničar	New	Not	1921	1941	2011	Slovenia	Slovene	Male	
Stevan Doronjski	New	Elected	1919	1939	1981	Vojvodina	Serb	Male	
Ratomir Dugonjić	Old	Removed	1916	1937	1987	Bosnia-Herzegovina	Serb	Male	
Pavle Gaži	New	Not	1927	1945	2021	Croatia	Croat	Male	
Slavka Georgieva	By-election	Not	1926	1944	?	Macedonia	Macedonian	Female	
Kiro Gligorov	New	Elected	1917	1943	2012	Macedonia	Macedonian	Male	
Vinko Hafner	New	Not	1920	1940	2015	Slovenia	Slovene	Male	
Fadilj Hodža	Old	Elected	1916	1941	2001	Kosovo	Albanian	Male	
Edvard Kardelj	Old	Elected	1910	1928	1979	Slovenia	Slovene	Male	
Stane Kavčič	New	Resigned	1919	1941	1987	Slovenia	Slovene	Male	
Maćaš Kelemen	By-election	Removed	1921	1944	2003	Vojvodina	Hungarian	Male	
Tomislav Knežević	By-election	Not	?	?	?	Montenegro	Montenegrin	Male	
Lazar Koliševski	Old	Removed	1914	1935	2000	Macedonia	Macedonian	Male	
Sergej Kraigher	New	Not	1914	1934	2001	Slovenia	Slovene	Male	
Stane Kranjc	New	Not	1929	1948	?	Slovenia	Slovene	Male	
Sead Kreso	By-election	Not	1941	1959	2008	Bosnia-Herzegovina	Muslim	Male	
Todo Kurtović	By-election	Elected	1919	1941	1997	Bosnia-Herzegovina	Serb	Male	
Zvonimir Liker	New	Not	1929	1948	1989	Croatia	Croat	Male	
Nikola Ljubičić	New	Elected	1916	1941	2005	Yugoslav People's Army	Serb	Male	
Munir Mesihović	By-election	Not	1928	1946	2016	Bosnia-Herzegovina	Muslim	Male	
Meho Midžić	By-election	Not	?	?	?	Bosnia-Herzegovina	Muslim	Male	
Niko Mihaljević	By-election	Not	1920	1941	2005	Bosnia-Herzegovina	Croat	Male	
Cvijetin Mijatović	Old	Elected	1913	1934	1993	Bosnia-Herzegovina	Serb	Male	
Slavko Milosavlevski	New	Not	1928	1943	2012	Macedonia	Macedonian	Male	
Jožef Nađ	New	Died	1921	1942	1969	Vojvodina	Hungarian	Male	
Miroslav Pečujlić	New	Not	1929	1944	2006	Serbia	Croat	Male	
Jovan Pečenović	New	Not	1933	1952	2021	Kosovo	Albanian	Male	
Latinka Perović	New	Resigned	1933	1951	2022	Serbia	Serb	Female	
Risto Petrovski	By-election	Not	1928	1944	?	Macedonia	Macedonian	Male	
Milentije Popović	Old	Died	1913	1939	1971	Serbia	Serb	Male	
Hamdija Pozderac	New	Removed	1924	1943	1988	Bosnia-Herzegovina	Muslim	Male	
Hisen Ramadani	By-election	Not	1933	1954	2012	Macedonia	Albanian	Male	
Mitja Ribičič	New	Not	1919	1941	2013	Slovenia	Slovene	Male	
Džemil Šarac	By-election	Not	1921	1941	2002	Yugoslav People's Army	Muslim	Male	
Mihalj Šefer	By-election	Not	1925	1947	?	Kosovo	Albanian	Male	
Boško Šiljegović	New	Not	1915	1940	1990	Bosnia-Herzegovina	Serb	Male	
Kolj Široka	New	Elected	1922	1941	1994	Kosovo	Albanian	Male	
Budislav Šoškić	New	Elected	1925	1942	1979	Montenegro	Serb	Male	
Petar Stambolić	Old	Elected	1912	1935	2007	Serbia	Serb	Male	
Milorad Stanojević	New	Not	1931	1948	2023	Montenegro	Montenegrin	Male	
Mirko Tepavac	New	Removed	1922	1942	2014	Vojvodina	Serb	Male	
Mijalko Todorović	New	Not	1913	1938	1999	Serbia	Serb	Male	
Mika Tripalo	New	Removed	1926	1943	1995	Croatia	Croat	Male	
Stanko Tomić	New	Not	1926	1943	?	Bosnia-Herzegovina	Serb	Male	
Veljko Vlahović	Old	Elected	1914	1935	1975	Montenegro	Montenegrin	Male	
Jovan Vujadinović	By-election	Elected	1921	1943	?	Montenegro	Montenegrin	Male	
Vidoje Žarković	New	Removed	1927	1943	2000	Montenegro	Montenegrin	Male	
Azem Zulfićari	New	Removed	1925	1948	?	Macedonia	Albanian	Male	

=== Ex officio ===
Ex Officio Members of the Presidency of the 9th Congress of the League of Communists of Yugoslavia
Name	Took office	Left office	Tenure	Birth	PM	Death	Office	Nationality	Gender	Ref.
Dušan Alimpić	24 December 1972	30 May 1974	1 year, 157 days	1921	1941	2002	Secretary of the League of Communists of Vojvodina Central Committee	Serb	Male	
Mahmut Bakalli	28 June 1971	30 May 1974	2 years, 336 days	1936	1957	2006	Secretary of the League of Communists of Kosovo Central Committee	Albanian	Male	
Mirko Čanadanović	April 1969	24 December 1972	3 years, 238 days	1936	1957	Alive	Secretary of the League of Communists of Vojvodina Central Committee	Serb	Male	
Angel Čemerski	15 March 1969	30 May 1974	5 years, 76 days	1923	1942	2003	Secretary of the League of Communists of Macedonia Central Committee	Macedonian	Male	
Savka Dabčević-Kučar	15 March 1969	14 December 1971	2 years, 274 days	1923	1943	2009	Secretary of the League of Communists of Croatia Central Committee	Croat	Female	
Veli Deva	15 March 1969	28 June 1971	2 years, 105 days	1923	1942	2015	Secretary of the League of Communists of Kosovo Central Committee	Albanian	Male	
Veselin Đuranović	15 March 1969	30 May 1974	5 years, 76 days	1925	1944	1997	Secretary of the League of Communists of Montenegro Central Committee	Montenegrin	Male	
Branko Mikulić	15 March 1969	30 May 1974	5 years, 76 days	1928	1945	1994	Secretary of the League of Communists of Bosnia and Herzegovina Central Committee	Croat	Male	
Marko Nikezić	15 March 1969	26 October 1972	3 years, 225 days	1921	1940	1991	Secretary of the League of Communists of Serbia Central Committee	Serb	Male	
Milka Planinc	14 December 1971	30 May 1974	2 years, 167 days	1924	1944	2010	Secretary of the League of Communists of Croatia Central Committee	Croat	Female	
France Popit	15 March 1969	30 May 1974	5 years, 76 days	1921	1940	2013	Secretary of the League of Communists of Slovenia Central Committee	Slovene	Male	
Mirko Tepavac	15 March 1969	April 1969	46 days	1922	1942	2014	Secretary of the League of Communists of Vojvodina Central Committee	Serb	Male	
Josip Broz Tito	15 March 1969	30 May 1974	5 years, 76 days	1892	1920	1980	President of the League of Communists of Yugoslavia Central Committee	Croat	Male	
Tihomir Vlaškalić	26 October 1972	30 May 1974	1 year, 216 days	1923	1945	1993	Secretary of the League of Communists of Serbia Central Committee	Serb	Male	

== Bibliography ==
=== Books ===
- Rajović, Radošin, ed. (1970). Jugoslovenski savremenici: Ko je ko u Jugoslaviji [Yugoslav Contemporaries: Who's Who in Yugoslavia] (in Serbo-Croatian). Hronometar.
- Lewytzkyj, Borys; Stroynowski, Juliusz, eds. (1978). Who's Who in the Socialist Countries. K. G. Saur Verlag. ISBN 3-7940-3017-6.
- Staff writer, ed. (1965). VIII Kongres Saveza Komunista Jugoslavije: Beograd, 7-13. decembra 1964.: stenog̈rafske beleške [VIII Congress of the League of Communists of Yugoslavia: Belgrade, 7-13. December 1964: shorthand notes] (in Serbo-Croatian). Vol. 3. Central Committee of the League of Communists of Yugoslavia.
- Staff writer, ed. (1966). Svjetski almanah [World Almanac] (in Serbo-Croatian). Vol. 4. Novinsko izdavačko poduzeće.
- Staff writer, ed. (1969). Peti kongres Saveza komunista Bosne i Hercegovine: Sarajevo, 9-11. januara 1969. Knjigu pripremili: Pozderac Hamdija [i dr.] [Fifth Congress of the Union of Communists of Bosnia and Herzegovina: Sarajevo, 9-11. January 1969. The book was prepared by: Pozderac Hamdija [and others].] (in Serbo-Croatian). Central Committee of the League of Communists of Bosnia and Herzegovina.
- Staff writer, ed. (1970a). Deveti kongres Saveza komunista Jugoslavije, Beograd, 11-13. III.1969 Stenografske beleške [Ninth Congress of the League of Communists of Yugoslavia, Belgrade, 11-13. III.1969 Stenographic notes] (in Serbo-Croatian). Vol. 2. Central Committee of the League of Communists of Yugoslavia.
- Staff writer, ed. (1970b). Konferencija Saveza komunista Jugoslavije, održana od 29. do 31. oktobra 1970 [Conference of the League of Communists of Yugoslavia, held from October 29 to 31, 1970] (in Serbo-Croatian). Vol. 1–3. Central Committee of the League of Communists of Yugoslavia.
- Stroynowski, Juliusz, ed. (1989a). Who's Who in the Socialist Countries of Europe: A–H. K. G. Saur Verlag. ISBN 3-598-10719-6.
- Stroynowski, Juliusz, ed. (1989b). Who's Who in the Socialist Countries of Europe: I–O. K. G. Saur Verlag. ISBN 3-598-10719-6.
- Stroynowski, Juliusz, ed. (1989c). Who's Who in the Socialist Countries of Europe: P–Z. K. G. Saur Verlag. ISBN 3-598-10719-6.
- Zalar, Charles, ed. (1961). Yugoslav Communism: A Critical Study. United States Government Printing Office. Archived from the original on 11 June 2023.

=== Journals ===
- Spasenovski, Aleksandar (December 2019). "The Transformation of the Macedonian Party System: From Monism Towards Pluralism". Political Thought. 17 (58). Konrad Adenauer Foundation and the Institute for Democracy Societas Civilis: 19–38. Archived from the original on 11 June 2023.
