= Presidency of the 11th Congress of the League of Communists of Yugoslavia =

11th Presidency
- Emblem of the League of Communists of Yugoslavia

23 June 1978 – 26 June 1982 (4 years, 3 days) Overview
- Type: Political-executive organ
- Election: 1st Session of the Central Committee of the 11th Congress

Members
- Total: 31 members
- Newcomers: 2 members (11th)
- Old: 13 members (10th)
- Reelected: 3 members (12th)
- By-elected: 6 members (11th)

This electoral term of the Presidency was elected by the 1st Session of the Central Committee of the 11th Congress of the League of Communists of Yugoslavia in 1978, and was in session until the gathering of the 12th Congress in 1982.

== Composition ==
=== Elected ===
Members of the Presidency of the 11th Congress of the League of Communists of Yugoslavia
Name	10th PRE	12th PRE	Birth	PM	Death	Branch	Nationality	Gender	Ref.
Dušan Alimpić	By-election	Not	1921	1941	2002	Vojvodina	Serb	Male	
Vladimir Bakarić	Old	Elected	1912	1933	1983	Croatia	Croat	Male	
Dobroslav Čulafić	By-election	Not	1926	1944	2011	Montenegro	Montenegrin	Male	
Stane Dolanc	Old	Not	1925	1944	1999	Slovenia	Slovene	Male	
Stevan Doronjski	Old	Died	1919	1939	1981	Vojvodina	Serb	Male	
Dušan Dragosavac	New	Elected	1919	1942	2014	Croatia	Serb	Male	
Veselin Đuranović	Old	Not	1925	1944	1997	Montenegro	Montenegrin	Male	
Aleksandar Grličkov	Old	Not	1923	1943	1989	Macedonia	Macedonian	Male	
Fadilj Hodža	Old	Not	1916	1941	2001	Kosovo	Albanian	Male	
Edvard Kardelj	Old	Died	1910	1928	1979	Slovenia	Slovene	Male	
Lazar Koliševski	Old	Relieved	1914	1935	2000	Macedonia	Macedonian	Male	
Nikola Ljubičić	Old	Not	1916	1941	2005	Yugoslav People's Army	Serb	Male	
Andrej Marinc	By-election	Not	1930	1947	2025	Slovenia	Slovene	Male	
Dragoslav Marković	By-election	Elected	1920	1939	2005	Serbia	Serb	Male	
Cvijetin Mijatović	Old	Relieved	1913	1934	1993	Bosnia-Herzegovina	Serb	Male	
Branko Mikulić	New	Not	1928	1945	1994	Bosnia-Herzegovina	Croat	Male	
Miloš Minić	Old	Not	1914	1936	2003	Serbia	Serb	Male	
Lazar Mojsov	By-election	Not	1920	1940	2011	Macedonia	Macedonian	Male	
Hamdija Pozderac	By-election	Not	1924	1942	1988	Bosnia-Herzegovina	Muslim	Male	
Petar Stambolić	Old	Relieved	1912	1935	2007	Serbia	Serb	Male	
Vidoje Žarković	Old	Relieved	1927	1943	2000	Montenegro	Montenegrin	Male	

=== Ex officio ===
Ex Officio Members of the Presidency of the 11th Congress of the League of Communists of Yugoslavia
Name	Took office	Left office	Tenure	Birth	PM	Death	Office	Nationality	Gender	Ref.
Dušan Alimpić	23 June 1978	28 April 1981	2 years, 309 days	1921	1941	2002	Secretary of the League of Communists of Vojvodina Central Committee	Serb	Male	
Mahmut Bakalli	23 June 1978	6 May 1981	2 years, 317 days	1936	1957	2006	Secretary of the League of Communists of Kosovo Central Committee	Albanian	Male	
Angel Čemerski	23 June 1978	29 June 1982	4 years, 6 days	1923	1942	2003	Secretary of the League of Communists of Macedonia Central Committee	Macedonian	Male	
Veli Deva	6 May 1981	29 June 1982	1 year, 54 days	1923	1942	2015	Secretary of the League of Communists of Kosovo Central Committee	Albanian	Male	
Boško Krunić	28 April 1981	29 June 1982	1 year, 62 days	1929	1945	2017	Secretary of the League of Communists of Vojvodina Central Committee	Serb	Male	
Milka Planinc	23 June 1978	29 June 1982	4 years, 6 days	1924	1944	2010	Secretary of the League of Communists of Croatia Central Committee	Croat	Female	
France Popit	23 June 1978	29 June 1982	4 years, 6 days	1921	1940	2013	Secretary of the League of Communists of Slovenia Central Committee	Slovene	Male	
Hamdija Pozderac	23 May 1982	29 June 1982	37 days	1924	1942	1988	Secretary of the League of Communists of Bosnia and Herzegovina Central Committee	Muslim	Male	
Vojislav Srzentić	23 June 1978	29 June 1982	4 years, 6 days	1934	1952	Alive	Secretary of the League of Communists of Montenegro Central Committee	Montenegrin	Male	
Nikola Stojanović	23 June 1978	23 May 1982	3 years, 334 days	1933	1952	2020	Secretary of the League of Communists of Bosnia and Herzegovina Central Committee	Serb	Male	
Josip Broz Tito	23 June 1978	4 May 1980	1 year, 316 days	1892	1920	1980	President of the League of Communists of Yugoslavia Central Committee	Croat	Male	
Tihomir Vlaškalić	23 June 1978	29 June 1982	4 years, 6 days	1923	1945	1993	Secretary of the League of Communists of Serbia Central Committee	Serb	Male	

== Bibliography ==
=== Books ===
- Joksimović, Milan; Rajović, Radošin, eds. (1970). Jugoslovenski savremenici: Ko je ko u Jugoslaviji [Yugoslav Contemporaries: Who's Who in Yugoslavia] (in Serbo-Croatian). Hronometar.
- Staff writer, ed. (1965). VIII Kongres Saveza Komunista Jugoslavije: Beograd, 7-13. decembra 1964.: stenog̈rafske beleške [VIII Congress of the League of Communists of Yugoslavia: Belgrade, 7-13. December 1964: shorthand notes] (in Serbo-Croatian). Vol. 3. Central Committee of the League of Communists of Yugoslavia.
- Staff writer, ed. (1966). Svjetski almanah [World Almanac] (in Serbo-Croatian). Vol. 4. Novinsko izdavačko poduzeće.
- Staff writer, ed. (1969). Peti kongres Saveza komunista Bosne i Hercegovine: Sarajevo, 9-11. januara 1969. Knjigu pripremili: Pozderac Hamdija [i dr.] [Fifth Congress of the Union of Communists of Bosnia and Herzegovina: Sarajevo, 9-11. January 1969. The book was prepared by: Pozderac Hamdija [and others].] (in Serbo-Croatian). Central Committee of the League of Communists of Bosnia and Herzegovina.
- Lewytzkyj, Borys; Stroynowski, Juliusz, eds. (1978). Who's Who in the Socialist Countries. K. G. Saur Verlag. ISBN 3-7940-3017-6.
- Staff writer, ed. (1970a). Deveti kongres Saveza komunista Jugoslavije, Beograd, 11-13. III.1969 Stenografske beleške [Ninth Congress of the League of Communists of Yugoslavia, Belgrade, 11-13. III.1969 Stenographic notes] (in Serbo-Croatian). Vol. 2. Central Committee of the League of Communists of Yugoslavia.
- Staff writer, ed. (1970b). Konferencija Saveza komunista Jugoslavije, održana od 29. do 31. oktobra 1970 [Conference of the League of Communists of Yugoslavia, held from October 29 to 31, 1970] (in Serbo-Croatian). Vol. 1–3. Central Committee of the League of Communists of Yugoslavia.
- Stroynowski, Juliusz, ed. (1989a). Who's Who in the Socialist Countries of Europe: A–H. K. G. Saur Verlag. ISBN 3-598-10719-6.
- Stroynowski, Juliusz, ed. (1989b). Who's Who in the Socialist Countries of Europe: I–O. K. G. Saur Verlag. ISBN 3-598-10719-6.
- Stroynowski, Juliusz, ed. (1989c). Who's Who in the Socialist Countries of Europe: P–Z. K. G. Saur Verlag. ISBN 3-598-10719-6.
- Zalar, Charles, ed. (1961). Yugoslav Communism: A Critical Study. United States Government Printing Office. Archived from the original on 11 June 2023.

=== Journals ===
- Spasenovski, Aleksandar (December 2019). "The Transformation of the Macedonian Party System: From Monism Towards Pluralism". Political Thought. 17 (58). Konrad Adenauer Foundation and the Institute for Democracy Societas Civilis: 19–38. Archived from the original on 11 June 2023.
