= Presidency of the 10th Congress of the League of Communists of Yugoslavia =

10th Presidency
- Emblem of the League of Communists of Yugoslavia

30 May 1974 – 23 June 1978 (4 years, 24 days) Overview
- Type: Political organ
- Election: 1st Session of the Central Committee of the 10th Congress

Members
- Total: 40 members
- Newcomers: 13 members (10th)
- Old: 15 members (9th)
- Reelected: 11 members (11th)
- By-elected: 11 members (10th)

This electoral term of the Presidency was elected by the 1st Session of the Central Committee of the 10th Congress of the League of Communists of Yugoslavia in 1974, and was in session until the gathering of the 11th Congress in 1978.

== Composition ==
=== Elected ===
Members of the Presidency of the 10th Congress of the League of Communists of Yugoslavia
Name	9th PRE	11th PRE	Birth	PM	Death	Branch	Nationality	Gender	Ref.
Roman Albreht	New	Not	1921	1945	2006	Slovenia	Slovene	Male	
Vladimir Bakarić	Old	Elected	1912	1933	1983	Croatia	Croat	Male	
Imre Balint	New	Not	1930	1947	?	Vojvodina	Hungarian	Male	
Milutin Baltić	By-election	Not	1920	1940	2013	Croatia	Serb	Male	
Džemal Bijedić	New	Died	1917	1939	1977	Bosnia-Herzegovina	Muslim	Male	
Jure Bilić	Old	Not	1922	1941	2006	Croatia	Croat	Male	
Dobroslav Ćulafić	By-election	Not	1926	1944	2011	Montenegro	Montenegrin	Male	
Stane Dolanc	Old	Elected	1925	1944	1999	Slovenia	Slovene	Male	
Stevan Doronjski	Old	Elected	1919	1939	1981	Vojvodina	Serb	Male	
Ratomir Dugonjić	Old	Not	1916	1937	1987	Bosnia-Herzegovina	Serb	Male	
Veselin Đuranović	By-election	Elected	1925	1944	1997	Montenegro	Montenegrin	Male	
Kiro Gligorov	Old	Not	1917	1943	2012	Macedonia	Macedonian	Male	
Aleksandar Grličkov	New	Elected	1923	1943	1989	Macedonia	Macedonian	Male	
Fadilj Hodža	Old	Elected	1916	1941	2001	Kosovo	Albanian	Male	
Edvard Kardelj	Old	Elected	1910	1928	1979	Slovenia	Slovene	Male	
Lazar Koliševski	Comeback	Elected	1914	1935	2000	Macedonia	Macedonian	Male	
Ivan Kukoč	By-election	Not	1918	1935	2005	Yugoslav People's Army	Croat	Male	
Todo Kurtović	Old	Not	1919	1941	1997	Bosnia-Herzegovina	Serb	Male	
Nikola Ljubičić	Old	Elected	1916	1941	2005	Yugoslav People's Army	Serb	Male	
Krste Markovski	New	Not	1925	1941	?	Macedonia	Macedonian	Male	
Munir Mesihović	By-election	Not	1928	1946	2016	Bosnia-Herzegovina	Muslim	Male	
Cvijetin Mijatović	Old	Elected	1913	1934	1993	Bosnia-Herzegovina	Serb	Male	
Veljko Milatović	By-election	Not	1921	1940	2004	Montenegro	Montenegrin	Male	
Miloš Minić	New	Elected	1914	1936	2003	Serbia	Serb	Male	
Dušan Petrović	New	Died	1914	1935	1977	Serbia	Serb	Male	
Dušan Popović	By-election	Not	1921	1964	2014	Vojvodina	Serb	Male	
Mirko Popović	New	Not	1923	1941	1986	Serbia	Serb	Male	
Miha Ravnik	By-election	Not	1938	1957	2021	Slovenia	Slovene	Male	
Dušan Ristić	New	Not	1928	1947	?	Kosovo	Serb	Male	
Janko Smole	New	Not	1921	1943	2010	Slovenia	Slovene	Male	
Mika Špiljak	New	Not	1916	1938	2007	Croatia	Croat	Male	
Vojislav Srzentić	New	Relieved	1934	1952	Alive	Montenegro	Montenegrin	Male	
Petar Stambolić	Old	Elected	1912	1935	2007	Serbia	Serb	Male	
Dragoljub Stavrev	By-election	Not	1932	1950	2003	Macedonia	Macedonian	Male	
Ali Sukrija	By-election	Not	1919	1939	2005	Kosovo	Albanian	Male	
Dobrivoje Vidić	By-election	Not	1918	1939	1992	Serbia	Serb	Male	
Veljko Vlahović	Old	Died	1914	1935	1975	Montenegro	Montenegrin	Male	
Josip Vrhovec	New	Not	1926	1944	2006	Croatia	Croat	Male	
Jovan Vujadinović	Old	Not	1921	1943	?	Montenegro	Montenegrin	Male	
Vidoje Žarković	Old	Elected	1927	1943	2000	Montenegro	Montenegrin	Male	

=== Ex officio ===
Ex Officio Members of the Presidency of the 10th Congress of the League of Communists of Yugoslavia
Name	Took office	Left office	Tenure	Birth	PM	Death	Office	Nationality	Gender	Ref.
Dušan Alimpić	30 May 1974	23 June 1978	4 years, 24 days	1921	1941	2002	Secretary of the League of Communists of Vojvodina Central Committee	Serb	Male	
Mahmut Bakalli	30 May 1974	23 June 1978	4 years, 24 days	1936	1957	2006	Secretary of the League of Communists of Kosovo Central Committee	Albanian	Male	
Angel Čemerski	30 May 1974	23 June 1978	4 years, 24 days	1923	1942	2003	Secretary of the League of Communists of Macedonia Central Committee	Macedonian	Male	
Veselin Đuranović	30 May 1974	21 March 1977	2 years, 305 days	1925	1944	1997	Secretary of the League of Communists of Montenegro Central Committee	Montenegrin	Male	
Milka Planinc	30 May 1974	23 June 1978	4 years, 24 days	1924	1944	2010	Secretary of the League of Communists of Croatia Central Committee	Croat	Female	
France Popit	30 May 1974	23 June 1978	4 years, 24 days	1921	1940	2013	Secretary of the League of Communists of Slovenia Central Committee	Slovene	Male	
Vojislav Srzentić	21 March 1977	23 June 1978	1 year, 84 days	1934	1952	Alive	Secretary of the League of Communists of Montenegro Central Committee	Montenegrin	Male	
Nikola Stojanović	30 May 1974	23 June 1978	4 years, 24 days	1933	1952	2020	Secretary of the League of Communists of Bosnia and Herzegovina Central Committee	Serb	Male	
Josip Broz Tito	30 May 1974	23 June 1978	4 years, 24 days	1892	1920	1980	President of the League of Communists of Yugoslavia Central Committee	Croat	Male	
Tihomir Vlaškalić	30 May 1974	23 June 1978	4 years, 24 days	1923	1945	1993	Secretary of the League of Communists of Serbia Central Committee	Serb	Male	

== Bibliography ==
- Joksimović, Milan; Rajović, Radošin, eds. (1970). Jugoslovenski savremenici: Ko je ko u Jugoslaviji [Yugoslav Contemporaries: Who's Who in Yugoslavia] (in Serbo-Croatian). Hronometar.
- Staff writer, ed. (1965). VIII Kongres Saveza Komunista Jugoslavije: Beograd, 7-13. decembra 1964.: stenog̈rafske beleške [VIII Congress of the League of Communists of Yugoslavia: Belgrade, 7-13. December 1964: shorthand notes] (in Serbo-Croatian). Vol. 3. Central Committee of the League of Communists of Yugoslavia.
- Staff writer, ed. (1966). Svjetski almanah [World Almanac] (in Serbo-Croatian). Vol. 4. Novinsko izdavačko poduzeće.
- Staff writer, ed. (1969). Peti kongres Saveza komunista Bosne i Hercegovine: Sarajevo, 9-11. januara 1969. Knjigu pripremili: Pozderac Hamdija [i dr.] [Fifth Congress of the Union of Communists of Bosnia and Herzegovina: Sarajevo, 9-11. January 1969. The book was prepared by: Pozderac Hamdija [and others].] (in Serbo-Croatian). Central Committee of the League of Communists of Bosnia and Herzegovina.
- Lewytzkyj, Borys; Stroynowski, Juliusz, eds. (1978). Who's Who in the Socialist Countries. K. G. Saur Verlag. ISBN 3-7940-3017-6.
- Staff writer, ed. (1970a). Deveti kongres Saveza komunista Jugoslavije, Beograd, 11-13. III.1969 Stenografske beleške [Ninth Congress of the League of Communists of Yugoslavia, Belgrade, 11-13. III.1969 Stenographic notes] (in Serbo-Croatian). Vol. 2. Central Committee of the League of Communists of Yugoslavia.
- Staff writer, ed. (1970b). Konferencija Saveza komunista Jugoslavije, održana od 29. do 31. oktobra 1970 [Conference of the League of Communists of Yugoslavia, held from October 29 to 31, 1970] (in Serbo-Croatian). Vol. 1–3. Central Committee of the League of Communists of Yugoslavia.
- Stroynowski, Juliusz, ed. (1989a). Who's Who in the Socialist Countries of Europe: A–H. K. G. Saur Verlag. ISBN 3-598-10719-6.
- Stroynowski, Juliusz, ed. (1989b). Who's Who in the Socialist Countries of Europe: I–O. K. G. Saur Verlag. ISBN 3-598-10719-6.
- Stroynowski, Juliusz, ed. (1989c). Who's Who in the Socialist Countries of Europe: P–Z. K. G. Saur Verlag. ISBN 3-598-10719-6.
- Zalar, Charles, ed. (1961). Yugoslav Communism: A Critical Study. United States Government Printing Office. Archived from the original on 11 June 2023.
