= Presidency of the 12th Congress of the League of Communists of Yugoslavia =

12th Presidency
- Emblem of the League of Communists of Yugoslavia

29 June 1982 – 25 June 1986 (3 years, 361 days) Overview
- Type: Political-executive organ
- Election: 1st Session of the Central Committee of the 12th Congress

Members
- Total: 38 members
- Newcomers: 12 members (12th)
- Old: 4 members (11th)
- By-elected: 3 members (12th)

This electoral term of the Presidency was elected by the 1st Session of the Central Committee of the 12th Congress of the League of Communists of Yugoslavia in 1982, and was in session until the gathering of the 13th Congress in 1986.

== Composition ==
=== Elected ===
Members of the Presidency of the 12th Congress of the League of Communists of Yugoslavia
Name	11th PRE	13th PRE	Birth	PM	Death	Branch	Nationality	Gender	Ref.
Vladimir Bakarić	Old	Died	1912	1933	1983	Croatia	Croat	Male	
Dimče Belovski	New	Not	1923	1943	2010	Macedonia	Macedonian	Male	
Jure Bilić	By-election	Not	1922	1941	2006	Croatia	Croat	Male	
Dušan Dragosavac	Old	Not	1919	1942	2014	Croatia	Serb	Male	
Kiro Hadživasilev	New	Not	1921	1943	2000	Macedonia	Macedonian	Male	
Franjo Herljević	New	Relieved	1915	1940	1998	Bosnia-Herzegovina	Croat	Male	
Milan Kučan	New	Not	1941	1958	Alive	Slovenia	Slovene	Male	
Dragoslav Marković	Old	Not	1920	1939	2005	Serbia	Serb	Male	
Petar Matić	Old	Not	1920	1940	2024	Vojvodina	Serb	Male	
Veljko Milatović	New	Relieved	1921	1940	2004	Montenegro	Montenegrin	Male	
Hamdija Pozderac	By-election	Not	1924	1942	1988	Bosnia-Herzegovina	Muslim	Male	
Miljan Radović	New	Not	1933	1951	2015	Montenegro	Montenegrin	Male	
Mitja Ribičič	New	Not	1919	1941	2013	Slovenia	Slovene	Male	
Nikola Stojanović	New	Not	1933	1952	2020	Bosnia-Herzegovina	Croat	Male	
Ali Šukrija	New	Not	1919	1939	2005	Kosovo	Albanian	Male	
Dobrivoje Vidić	New	Not	1918	1939	1992	Serbia	Serb	Male	
Vidoje Žarković	By-election	Elected	1927	1943	2000	Montenegro	Montenegrin	Male	

=== Ex officio ===
Ex Officio Members of the Presidency of the 12th Congress of the League of Communists of Yugoslavia
Name	Took office	Left office	Tenure	Birth	PM	Death	Office	Nationality	Gender	Ref.
Mato Andrić	28 May 1984	25 June 1986	2 years, 28 days	1928	1945	2015	President of the League of Communists of Bosnia and Herzegovina Central Committee	Croat	Male	
Jure Bilić	29 June 1982	1 July 1983	1 year, 2 days	1922	1941	2006	President of the League of Communists of Croatia Central Committee	Croat	Male	
Dušan Čkrebić	29 June 1982	17 May 1984	1 year, 323 days	1927	1945	2022	President of the League of Communists of Serbia Central Committee	Serb	Male	
Dane Ćuić	29 June 1982	26 June 1984	1 year, 362 days	1923	1942	1988	President of the Organisation of the League of Communists in the Yugoslav People's Army	Serb	Male	
Dobroslav Ćulafić	29 June 1982	17 May 1984	1 year, 323 days	1926	1944	2011	President of the League of Communists of Montenegro Central Committee	Montenegrin	Male	
Svetislav Dolašević	March 1984	May 1985	1 year, 61 days	1926	1945	1995	President of the League of Communists of Kosovo Central Committee	Serb	Male	
Marko Đuričin	29 June 1982	28 April 1983	303 days	1925	1948	2013	President of the League of Communists of Vojvodina Central Committee	Serb	Male	
Sinan Hasani	29 June 1982	May 1983	306 days	1922	1942	2010	President of the League of Communists of Kosovo Central Committee	Albanian	Male	
Georgije Jovičić	26 June 1984	25 June 1986	1 year, 364 days	1927	1942	2011	President of the Organisation of the League of Communists in the Yugoslav People's Army	Montenegrin	Male	
Boško Krunić	28 April 1984	24 April 1985	361 days	1929	1945	2017	President of the League of Communists of Vojvodina Central Committee	Serb	Male	
Ilijaz Kurteši	May 1983	March 1984	305 days	1927	1949	2016	President of the League of Communists of Kosovo Central Committee	Albanian	Male	
Andrej Marinc	29 June 1982	25 June 1986	3 years, 361 days	1930	1947	2025	President of the League of Communists of Slovenia Central Committee	Slovene	Male	
Krste Markovski	29 June 1982	5 May 1984	1 year, 311 days	1925	1941	?	President of the League of Communists of Macedonia Central Committee	Macedonian	Male	
Marko Orlandić	30 July 1984	25 June 1986	1 year, 330 days	1930	1948	2019	President of the League of Communists of Montenegro Central Committee	Montenegrin	Male	
Milan Pančevski	5 May 1984	25 June 1986	2 years, 51 days	1935	1957	2019	President of the League of Communists of Macedonia Central Committee	Macedonian	Male	
Hamdija Pozderac	29 June 1982	28 May 1984	1 year, 334 days	1924	1943	1988	President of the League of Communists of Bosnia and Herzegovina Central Committee	Muslim	Male	
Kolj Široka	May 1985	May 1986	1 year, 61 days	1922	1941	1994	President of the League of Communists of Kosovo Central Committee	Albanian	Male	
Mika Špiljak	14 May 1984	25 June 1986	2 years, 42 days	1916	1938	2007	President of the League of Communists of Croatia Central Committee	Croat	Male	
Ivan Stambolić	17 May 1984	25 June 1986	2 years, 39 days	1936	1954	2000	President of the League of Communists of Serbia Central Committee	Serb	Male	
Đorđe Stojšić	24 April 1985	25 June 1986	1 year, 62 days	1928	1945	2014	President of the League of Communists of Vojvodina Central Committee	Serb	Male	
Slavko Veselinov	28 April 1983	28 April 1984	1 year, 0 days	1925	1943	1997	President of the League of Communists of Vojvodina Central Committee	Serb	Male	
Azem Vllasi	May 1986	25 June 1986	55 days	1948	1967	Alive	President of the League of Communists of Kosovo Central Committee	Albanian	Male	
Josip Vrhovec	1 July 1983	14 May 1984	318 days	1926	1944	2006	President of the League of Communists of Croatia Central Committee	Croat	Male	
Vidoje Žarković	17 May 1984	30 July 1984	74 days	1927	1943	2000	President of the League of Communists of Montenegro Central Committee	Montenegrin	Male	

== Bibliography ==
- Lewytzkyj, Borys; Stroynowski, Juliusz, eds. (1978). Who's Who in the Socialist Countries. K. G. Saur Verlag. ISBN 3-7940-3017-6.
- Stroynowski, Juliusz, ed. (1989a). Who's Who in the Socialist Countries of Europe: A–H. K. G. Saur Verlag. ISBN 3-598-10719-6.
- Stroynowski, Juliusz, ed. (1989b). Who's Who in the Socialist Countries of Europe: I–O. K. G. Saur Verlag. ISBN 3-598-10719-6.
- Stroynowski, Juliusz, ed. (1989c). Who's Who in the Socialist Countries of Europe: P–Z. K. G. Saur Verlag. ISBN 3-598-10719-6.
