= Presidency of the 13th Congress of the League of Communists of Yugoslavia =

13th Presidency
- Emblem of the League of Communists of Yugoslavia

28 June 1986 – 26 May 1990 (3 years, 331 days) Overview
- Type: Political-executive organ
- Election: 1st Session of the Central Committee of the 13th Congress

Members
- Total: 42 members
- Newcomers: 34 members (13th)
- Old: 1 members (12th)
- By-elected: 8 members (12th)

This electoral term of the Presidency was elected by the 1st Session of the Central Committee of the 13th Congress of the League of Communists of Yugoslavia in 1986, and was in session until the end of the 14th Congress on 26 May, but that congress opted instead to elect the Committee for the Preparation of the Democratic and Programmatic Renewal rather than another electoral term of the presidency.

== Composition ==
=== Elected ===
Members of the Presidency of the 13th Congress of the League of Communists of Yugoslavia
| Name | 12th PRE | 14th CON | Birth | PM | Death | Branch | Nationality | Gender | Ref. |
|---|---|---|---|---|---|---|---|---|---|
| Ivan Brigić | New | Not | 1936 | 1957 | 2015 | Bosnia-Herzegovina | Croat | Male | |
| Dušan Čkrebić | New | Not | 1927 | 1945 | 2022 | Serbia | Serb | Male | |
| Radiša Gačić | New | Relieved | 1938 | 1957 | Alive | Serbia | Serb | Male | |
| Miomir Grbović | By-election | Not | 1951 | 1973 | Alive | Montenegro | Montenegrin | Male | |
| Štefan Korošec | New | Not | 1938 | 1957 | 2014 | Slovenia | Slovene | Male | |
| Boško Krunić | New | Relieved | 1929 | 1946 | 2017 | Vojvodina | Serb | Male | |
| Boris Muževič | By-election | Not | 1949 | 1968 | 2025 | Slovenia | Slovene | Male | |
| Marko Orlandić | New | Not | 1930 | 1948 | 2019 | Montenegro | Montenegrin | Male | |
| Milan Pančevski | New | Not | 1935 | 1957 | 2019 | Macedonia | Macedonian | Male | |
| Ivica Racan | New | Not | 1944 | 1959 | 2007 | Croatia | Croat | Male | |
| Stanko Radmilović | By-election | Not | 1936 | 1960 | 2016 | Vojvodina | Serb | Male | |
| Milanko Renovica | New | Relieved | 1928 | 1947 | 2013 | Bosnia-Herzegovina | Serb | Male | |
| Franc Šetinc | New | Relieved | 1929 | 1948 | 2016 | Slovenia | Slovene | Male | |
| Kolj Široka | New | Relieved | 1922 | 1941 | 1994 | Kosovo | Albanian | Male | |
| Petar Škundrić | By-election | Not | 1947 | 1965 | Alive | Serbia | Serb | Male | |
| Stipe Šuvar | New | Not | 1936 | 1955 | 2004 | Croatia | Croat | Male | |
| Vasil Tupurkovski | New | Relieved | 1951 | 1973 | Alive | Macedonia | Macedonian | Male | |
| Uglješa Uzelac | By-election | Not | 1938 | ? | 1997 | Bosnia-Herzegovina | Muslim | Male | |
| Ljubomir Varošlija | By-election | Not | ? | ? | ? | Macedonia | Macedonian | Male | |
| Pero Vukotić | By-election | Not | 1945 | 1953 | ? | Montenegro | Montenegrin | Male | |
| Vidoje Žarković | Old | Relieved | 1927 | 1943 | 2000 | Montenegro | Montenegrin | Male | |
| Jusuf Zejnullahu | By-election | Not | 1944 | ? | Alive | Kosovo | Albanian | Male | |

=== Ex officio ===
Ex Officio Members of the Presidency of the 13th Congress of the League of Communists of Yugoslavia
| Name | Took office | Left office | Tenure | Birth | PM | Death | Office | Nationality | Gender | Ref. |
|---|---|---|---|---|---|---|---|---|---|---|
| Momir Bulatović | 28 April 1989 | 4 February 1990 | 282 days | 1956 | ? | 2019 | President of the League of Communists of Montenegro Central Committee | Montenegrin | Male | |
| Nijaz Duraković | 29 June 1989 | 27 December 1992 | 1 year, 181 days | 1949 | 1967 | 2012 | President of the League of Communists of Bosnia and Herzegovina Central Committee | Muslim | Male | |
| Petar Gošev | 1989 | 20 April 1990 | 1 year, 109 days | 1948 | 1971 | Alive | President of the League of Communists of Macedonia Central Committee | Macedonian | Male | |
| Kaqusha Jashari | May 1988 | 17 November 1988 | 200 days | 1946 | 1975 | 2025 | President of the League of Communists of Kosovo Central Committee | Albanian | Female | |
| Georgije Jovičić | 28 June 1986 | 1988 | 1 year, 187 days | 1927 | 1942 | 2011 | President of the Organisation of the League of Communists in the Yugoslav People's Army | Montenegrin | Male | |
| Remzi Kolgeci | 17 November 1988 | 27 January 1989 | 71 days | 1947 | ? | 2011 | President of the League of Communists of Kosovo Central Committee | Albanian | Male | |
| Boško Kovačević | 14 November 1988 | 20 January 1989 | 67 days | 1946 | ? | 2023 | President of the League of Communists of Vojvodina Central Committee | Serb | Male | ? |
| Milan Kučan | 28 June 1986 | December 1989 | 3 years, 156 days | 1941 | 1958 | Alive | President of the League of Communists of Slovenia Central Committee | Slovene | Male | |
| Jakov Lazaroski | 28 June 1986 | December 1989 | 2 years, 187 days | 1936 | 1958 | 2021 | President of the League of Communists of Macedonia Central Committee | Macedonian | Male | |
| Slobodan Milošević | 28 June 1986 | 24 May 1989 | 2 years, 330 days | 1941 | 1959 | 2006 | President of the League of Communists of Serbia Central Committee | Serb | Male | |
| Rrahman Morina | 27 January 1989 | 16 July 1990 | 1 year, 170 days | 1943 | 1969 | 1990 | President of the League of Communists of Kosovo Central Committee | Albanian | Male | |
| Abdulah Mutapčić | May 1988 | 29 June 1989 | 1 year, 59 days | 1932 | 1960 | 2013 | President of the League of Communists of Bosnia and Herzegovina Central Committee | Muslim | Male | |
| Milica Pejanović | 26 April 1989 | 28 April 1989 | 2 days | 1959 | ? | Alive | President of the League of Communists of Montenegro Central Committee | Montenegrin | Female | |
| Ivica Račan | 28 June 1986 | 20 January 1990 | 50 days | 1944 | 1959 | 2007 | President of the League of Communists of Croatia Central Committee | Croat | Male | |
| Miljan Radović | 28 June 1986 | 11 January 1989 | 2 years, 197 days | 1933 | 1951 | 2015 | President of the League of Communists of Montenegro Central Committee | Montenegrin | Male | |
| Ciril Ribičič | December 1989 | 20 January 1990 | 52 days | 1947 | ? | Alive | President of the League of Communists of Slovenia Central Committee | Slovene | Male | |
| Milovan Šogorov | 6 October 1988 | 14 November 1988 | 39 days | 1941 | 1960 | 2020 | President of the League of Communists of Vojvodina Central Committee | Serb | Male | |
| Petar Šimić | 1988 | 20 January 1990 | 2 years, 19 days | 1932 | 1948 | 1990 | President of the Organisation of the League of Communists in the Yugoslav People's Army | Croat | Male | |
| Nedeljko Šipovac | 20 January 1989 | 20 January 1990 | 1 year, 177 days | 1942 | 1960 | 2025 | President of the League of Communists of Vojvodina Central Committee | Serb | Male | |
| Stanko Stojčević | 28 June 1986 | December 1989 | 3 years, 156 days | 1929 | 1944 | 2009 | President of the League of Communists of Croatia Central Committee | Croat | Male | |
| Đorđe Stojšić | 28 June 1986 | 6 October 1988 | 3 years, 206 days | 1928 | 1945 | 2014 | President of the League of Communists of Vojvodina Central Committee | Serb | Male | |
| Bogdan Trifunović | 24 May 1989 | 16 July 1990 | 1 year, 53 days | 1933 | 1950 | 2007 | President of the League of Communists of Serbia Central Committee | Serb | Male | |
| Milan Uzelac | 28 June 1986 | May 1988 | 1 year, 308 days | 1932 | 1949 | 2005 | President of the League of Communists of Bosnia and Herzegovina Central Committee | Muslim | Male | |
| Azem Vllasi | 28 June 1986 | May 1988 | 1 year, 308 days | 1948 | 1965 | Alive | President of the League of Communists of Kosovo Central Committee | Albanian | Male | |

== Bibliography ==
=== Books ===
- Bechev, Dimitar (2019). Historical Dictionary of North Macedonia. Rowman & Littlefield Publishers. ISBN 9781538119617.
- Djukanović, Bojka (2023). Historical Dictionary of Montenegro. Rowman & Littlefield Publishers. ISBN 9781538139158.
- Elsie, Robert (2011). Historical Dictionary of Kosovo. Scarecrow Press. ISBN 9780810874831.
- Lewytzkyj, Borys; Stroynowski, Juliusz, eds. (1978). Who's Who in the Socialist Countries. K. G. Saur Verlag. ISBN 3-7940-3017-6.
- Kravchenko, Leonid Petrovich (1990). Кто есть кто в мировой политике [Who's Who in World Politics] (in Russian). Publishing House of Political Literature. ISBN 9785250005135.
- Morrison, Kenneth (2018). Nationalism, Identity and Statehood in Post-Yugoslav Montenegro. Bloomsbury Publishing. ISBN 9781474235204.
- Plut-Pregelj, Leopoldina; Kranjc, Gregor; Lazarević, Žarko; Rogel, Carole (2018). Historical Dictionary of Slovenia. Rowman & Littlefield Publishers. ISBN 9781538111062.
- Staff writer, ed. (1969). Šesta sjednica Republičke konferencije SSRN BiH [The Sixth Session of the Republican Conference of the SSRN BiH] (in Serbo-Croatian). Centar za političko informisanje i dokumentaciju.
- Staff writer (1986). Directory of Yugoslav officials: A Reference Aid. University of Michigan. Archived from the original on 25 May 2023.
- Staff writer (May 1990). "New state President–Warning on country's disintegration–Non-communist governments in Slovenia and Croatia". Keesing's Record of World Events. 36 (5). Keesing’s Record of World Events.
- Stanković, Slobodan (1981). The End of the Tito Era: Yugoslavia's Dilemmas. Hoover International Studies. ISBN 9780817973629.
- Štěpánek, Václav (2016). Jugoslávie – Srbsko – Kosovo: Kosovská otázka ve 20. století [Yugoslavia–Serbia–Kosovo: The Kosovo Question in the 20th Century] (in Czech). Masarykova univerzita. ISBN 9788021082113.
- Stroynowski, Juliusz, ed. (1989a). Who's Who in the Socialist Countries of Europe: A–H. K. G. Saur Verlag. ISBN 3-598-10719-6.
- Stroynowski, Juliusz, ed. (1989b). Who's Who in the Socialist Countries of Europe: I–O. K. G. Saur Verlag. ISBN 3-598-10719-6.
- Stroynowski, Juliusz, ed. (1989c). Who's Who in the Socialist Countries of Europe: P–Z. K. G. Saur Verlag. ISBN 3-598-10719-6.
- Torov, Ivan (1990). "Pancevski Replaced by Grbovic as LCY Chief". Daily Report: East Europe. Vol. 101–110. Foreign Broadcast Information Service. p. 46.

=== Journals ===
- Spasenovski, Aleksandar (December 2019). "The Transformation of the Macedonian Party System: From Monism Towards Pluralism". Political Thought. 17 (58). Konrad Adenauer Foundation and the Institute for Democracy Societas Civilis: 19–38. Archived from the original on 11 June 2023.

=== Newspaper ===
- Staff writer (21 February 1989). "Novi članovi Predsedništva CK SKJ" [New members of the Presidency of the CC LCY]. Borba (in Serbo-Croatian). Socialist Alliance of Working People: 1. Archived from the original on 28 January 2025.
- Staff writer (29 June 1986). "Председништво ЦК СКЈ" [Presidency of the CC LCY]. Borba (in Serbo-Croatian). Socialist Alliance of Working People: 1. Archived from the original on 28 January 2025.
- Staff writer (17 May 1982). "Чланови Савезног извршног већа" [Members of the Federal Executive Council]. Borba (in Serbo-Croatian). Socialist Alliance of Working People: 4.
