= 12th Congress of the League of Communists of Yugoslavia =

Political event in Yugoslavia

12th Congress of the League of Communists of Yugoslavia Дванаести конгрес Савеза комуниста Југославије
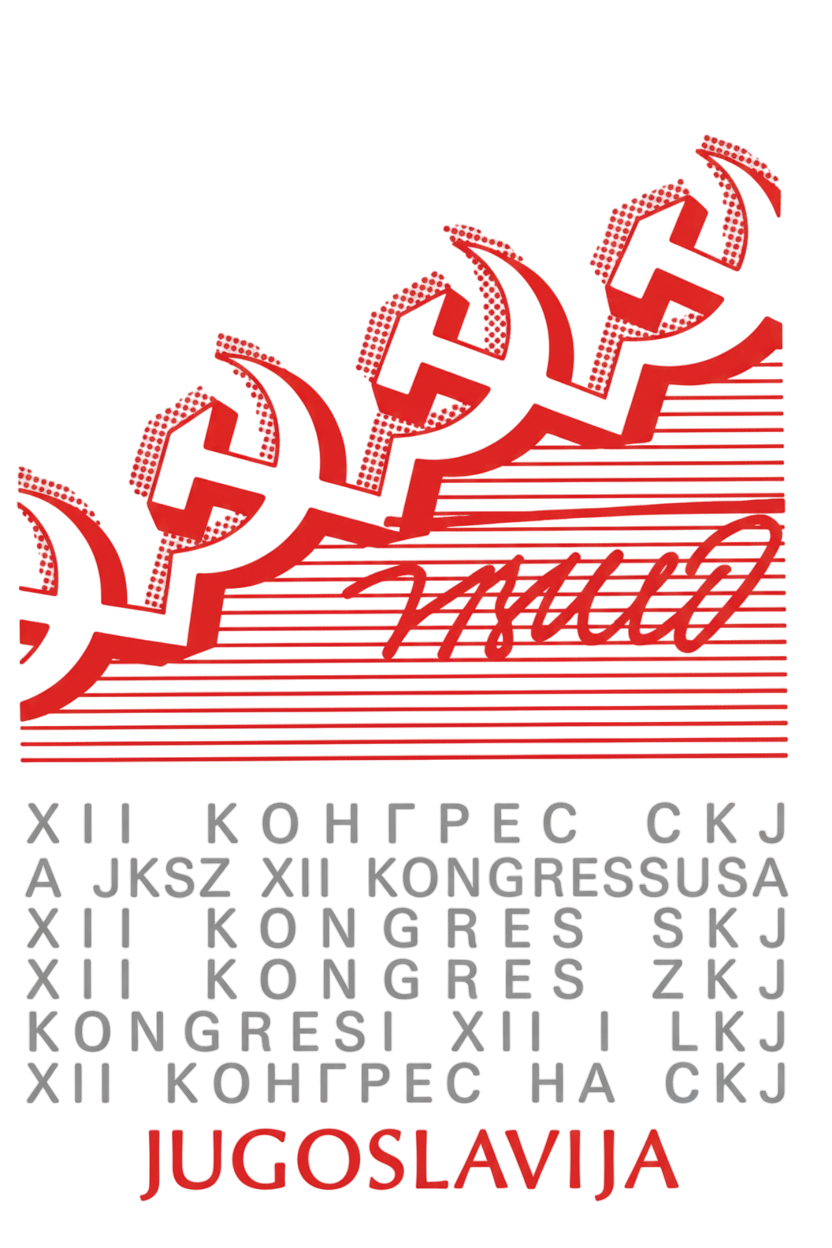
- Logo of 12th Congress of the League of Communists of Yugoslavia in 1982

Overview
- Type: Highest forum
- Convenor: 13th Session of the Central Committee of the 11th Congress
- Presiding organ: Working Presidency
- Electoral organ: Commission for the Verification of the Election
- Elected bodies: Central Committee; Statutory Commission; Supervisory Commission

Meeting place
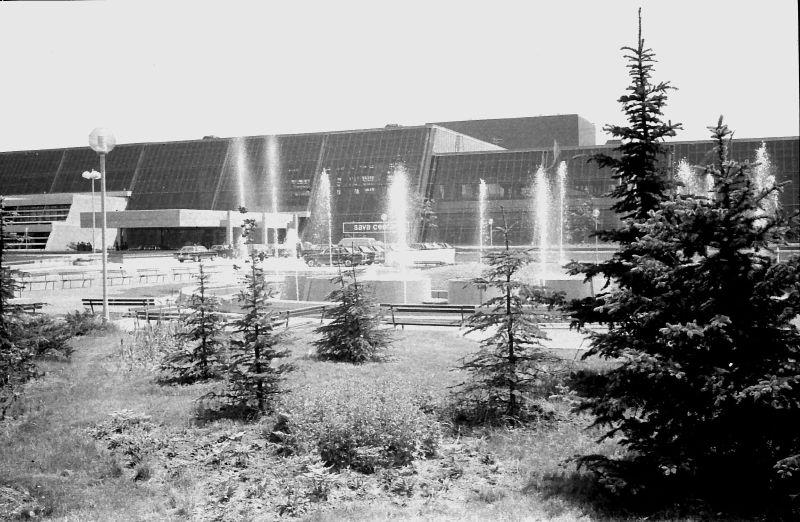
- Sava Centar, Beograd; SR Serbia, SFR Yugoslavia

The League of Communists of Yugoslavia (LCY) convened the highest forum for its 12th Congress from 26 to 29 June 1982 at the Sava Centar in Belgrade, Socialist Republic of Serbia. It was the first party congress in four years and the first since the 4 May 1980 death of Josip Broz Tito, the long-standing leader of the LCY and the Socialist Federal Republic of Yugoslavia (SFRY). The congress was attended by 1,570 delegates, 355 guests and 118 foreign delegations. Preparations began on 29 September 1980, and its date was set at the 25th Session of the Central Committee of the 11th Congress on 8–9 April 1982. The congress was preceded by the congresses and conferences of the LCY constitutive branches which elected delegates and members of the Central Committee, Commission on Statutory Questions and Supervisory Commission of the LCY.

The congress was expected to provide answers to the socio-economic difficulties Yugoslavia was facing. With Tito's death, his dominant one-person leadership was replaced by a system of collective leadership centred on the presidency of the LCY Central Committee and the presidency of the SFRY. This leadership had to grapple with the 1981 Kosovo riots and their repercussions and the state's economic crisis. Congress proceedings went smoothly, ending with the verification of the Central Committee, Commission of Statutory Questions, and the Supervisory Commission of the LCY. The 1st Session of the Central Committee of the 12th Congress, held on 29 June and tasked with the election of the presidency of the 12th Congress, nearly provoked a party split.

At the Central Committee's 1st Session, Branko Mikulić (with the help of Dušan Dragosavac, the president of the Presidency of the LCY Central Committee) tried to block the election of Draža Marković, an outspoken member of the League of Communists of Serbia who advocated reducing the autonomy of Kosovo and Vojvodina within the Socialist Republic of Serbia. Petar Stambolić, a member of the LCY Central Committee and president of the Presidency of the SFRY, accused them of foreign interference in Serbia's internal affairs of and threatened to resign from office. Marković's opponents eventually relented, and he was elected to the presidency.

The 12th Congress was considered the most-free party gathering to that point, with open and candid criticism and differences aired in public. However, the congress has been considered a failure; it neither suggested or adopted solutions to the major problems the country was facing, and it contributed to intensifying the conflict between the Serbian branch and the other branches.

== Background ==
=== Succession ===
This was the highest party gathering convened since the 4 May 1980 death of Josip Broz Tito, the longstanding leader of the League of Communists of Yugoslavia (LCY). The 11th LCY Congress, held from 20 to 23 June 1978, had amended the party statute to institute a system of collective leadership based on term limits and the rotation of cadres. Collective leadership was instituted immediately after Tito's death. The office of President of Yugoslavia was, in accordance with the constitution of the Socialist Federal Republic of Yugoslavia (SFRY), abolished at his death and its powers transferred to the Presidency of the SFRY.

Branko Mikulić, a member of the Presidency of the 11th LCY Central Committee, noted that (unlike the state constitution) the party statute had no stipulations on which organs the party president's powers were to be delegated at Tito's death but "The question regarding the transfer of power after Tito's death has been partially resolved by the adoption of the standing rules of the Central Committee and the Central Committee Presidency and by the decision of the Party Presidency on collective leadership". The 11th Session of the Central Committee of the 11th Congress, held on 12 June 1980, decided that the powers of the LCY president would be transferred to the LCY Central Committee and its political-executive organ, the Presidency. This was an informal decision; the party congress, not the LCY Central Committee, was empowered to amend the party statute. The committee also rejected a proposal to convene an extraordinary congress to amend the statute. At that session, Mikulić argued against immediately initiating a broad discussion on the party statute; the debate should be part of the preparation for the 12th Congress.

According to scholar Jens Reuter, it was "remarkable" that Mikulić's statement only dealt "with the question of which party organs the powers of the President of the LCY should be transferred to, but he does not mention the possibility of electing a new party leader." There seems to have existed political forces that favoured the retention of a strong leader while opposing the introduction of a collective leadership based on short-term limits and cadre rotation. The Yugoslav magazine NIN noted in their coverage that the office of LCY president had been vacant since 4 May 1980 and, in accordance with Article 69, it was the responsibility of the party congress to elect a new officeholder.

The party leadership seems to have seen the NIN article, and the Telegraphic Agency of New Yugoslavia (TANJUG) released commentary with several counter-arguments: "Although the above-mentioned interpretation [the NIN article] does not state this explicitly, it nevertheless falsely suggests that the election of a new president of the LCY is imminent at the upcoming 12th Congress of the SKJ. The truth, however, is different and, it seems, simpler." According to TANJUG, Tito was elected president of the LCY with an unlimited term because of his unique historical role. It also noted that Tito had, during his last years, delegated some of his powers as LCY president to the Presidency as the political-executive organ of the LCY Central Committee. It concluded, "Since 4 May 1980, the Presidency of the LCY has taken on the entire burden of responsibility of the function of the President of the LCY. In this very important respect, nothing has remained 'vacant.'" Tanjug, like Mikulić, also recommended initiating extensive consultations on amending the party statute throughout the party as part of preparations for the 12th Congress.

The TANJUG commentary did not end the debate. A new article in the NIN criticised it, saying that TANJUG had caused "a certain degree of confusion" since it described the LCY Presidency as the "collective president of the LCY". This was an "awkward formulation", they said, since nowhere in the party statute was the Presidency granted such a status. The newspaper Politika agreed, noting that the party statute defined the Presidency as a political-executive organ of the LCY Central Committee and not as the "collective president of the LCY". In theory, the 11th Session of the Central Committee of the 11th LCY Congress had transferred the powers of the LCY president to the LCY Central Committee. In practice, the following powers of the LCY president were delegated to the LCY Presidency: the power to convene, preside and direct the work of the LCY Central Committee; the right to propose proposals to the sessions of the Central Committee and the party Congress; initiating broad discussion with the LCY branches before central-level meetings, and the power to nominate the secretary of the LCY Presidency and executive secretaries for election at sessions of the LCY Central Committee.

=== Economic crisis ===
Beginning in the mid-to-late 1970s, Yugoslavia began experiencing an economic crisis. The internal federal market began to splinter into republican markets, and inter-republic trade began to sink. At the same time, the republics began to export and import more goods from abroad. The 1974 constitution called for the decentralisation of enterprises and worker management. These reforms produced bottlenecks; the republics centralised more authority and called on the federal government to devolve more authority to them. This further splintered the domestic Yugoslav market. In 1970, 59.6 percent of goods and services were traded within the republics; in 1980, it increased to 69 percent. At that point, only 21.7 percent of goods and services were traded between the Yugoslav republics and 9.3 percent were exported abroad. This led to strange situations. The socialist republics of Bosnia and Herzegovina, Slovenia and Serbia produced electricity but exported it instead of selling it to the other republics, and the socialist republics of Croatia, Macedonia and Montenegro were forced to import electricity from neighbouring countries.

Yugoslavia's state-party leaders were slow to recognise the country's economic crisis. By the mid-1970s, several Yugoslav economists warned about the economy's low labour productivity and high inflation and foreign debt. From 1973 to 1981, foreign debt increased from US$4.663 billion to $21.096 billion. Several short-term loans were made between 1977 and 1980 with interest rates which increased from 5.5 to 16.8 percent. Although Yugoslav politicians usually blamed the foreign economic environment for the crisis, economists cited errors in economic reforms. Until 1961, only the federal government could make loans on behalf of Yugoslavia; by 1971, each republic could borrow money itself. Beginning with Veselin Đuranović, who served as the president of the Federal Executive Council, the federal government began calling for greater centralisation; the LCY opposed the reforms, which contradicted the ideology that produced the 1974 Yugoslav constitution. This led to calls from the Federal Executive Council to begin a new round of economic reforms centralising state power, liberalising the economy and establishing a market economy, but the Presidency of the 11th Congress opposed such measures. Milka Planinc, the president of the Federal Executive Council from 1982 to 1986, experienced (like her predecessor, Đuranović) ideological opposition from the party leadership to enact reforms that could have halted the economic crisis. Posthumously, in 1998, Planinc summed up the problem:

The Party was supposed to be a cohesive force, but by then [1982] it had become, on the contrary, the main source of conflicts and conservatism in Yugoslav society. In Tito’s time, changes were still possible if Tito was convinced they were necessary. But after him, it was much more difficult. There was no money anymore to satisfy everyone's needs. And the federal government had no instruments to run affairs on its own. It had to rely on the republics, on the federal presidency, and on the Party presidency. When members of the Party leaderships became the main defenders of their own republics, Yugoslav cohesion became impossible.

=== Kosovo ===
The Kosovo riots began on 11 March 1981, when about 30 students began demonstrating in the cafeteria of the University of Pristina against the youth unemployment they faced when finishing their studies. This demonstration ended when the university's rector promised to consider their demands. Another student demonstration began on 26 March, with violent clashes with security forces. Twenty-three demonstrators and 14 members of Yugoslavia's militia, the country's law-enforcement agency, were injured. Twenty-one demonstrators were arrested, including the "ringleaders of the riots". Asllan Fazliu, the head of the League of Communists in Priština (the capital of Kosovo province), accused the demonstrators of anti-Yugoslav sentiments who took advantage of the "current socio-economic difficulties" with nationalistic, demagogic rhetoric. From 26 March to 1 April, demonstrations spread to Prizren, Uroševac, Obilić, Podujevë and Vushtrri. The most violent clashes occurred on 1 April; according to NIN magazine, they far exceeded the "harshness, brutality and the distinctly anti-Yugoslav character" of the previous demonstrations. At a federal-level press conference, LCY Presidency member Stane Dolanc said that a maximum of 2,000 people participated in the demonstrations; an estimated 200 of them were violent, damaging property and shooting at security forces.

Workers and students dominated the rioters, apparently forcing children between seven and twelve years old to participate in the demonstrations to make it more difficult for the militia to stop them. The rioters shouted several anti-Yugoslav and anti-LCY slogans, such as "We want a Republic of Kosovo", "We are Albanians and not Yugoslavs", "We have no rights here", "We demand a Greater Albania", "Kosovo for the Kosovars" and "Long live Marxism–Leninism, down with revisionism". The slogans led the LCY to accuse communist Albania of foreign interference in Yugoslavia's internal affairs. At about 18:30, rioters surrounded the headquarters of the Provincial Committee of the League of Communists of Kosovo (LCK). The militia responded with smoke bombs and tear gas. In the ensuing clashes, two rioters were shot dead. According to Yugoslav media, the militia were not armed with guns and stayed away from the demonstrators during the ensuing riots.

On 2 April, the LCY Presidency convened to discuss the situation in Kosovo. In a statement by Fadil Hoxha, a member of the Presidency from Kosovo, the LCY said that events in the province amounted to a counter-revolution: "[I] would like to make one thing clear right away: the events that have taken place in Pristina and some other places in Kosovo in recent days are a very cleverly planned work of a hostile nature. This is the work of the counter-revolution. [...] Their aim is to overthrow the political system of socialist self-government." Mahmut Bakali, president of the Presidency of the LCK Provincial Committee, agreed: "We are confronted with the methods of a special war that the reactionary forces in the world are waging against our country as well as against many other independent and non-aligned countries. The aim of these efforts is to provoke unrest and destabilisation in Yugoslavia." Dolanc dismissed the possibility of republican status for Kosovo, saying that it might threaten Yugoslavia's existence.

At first, the LCY and the Yugoslav state stopped short of accusing Albania of foreign interference; this changed, however, when an Albanian–Yugoslav press feud erupted. Zëri i Popullit, the newspaper of the Central Committee of the Party of Labour of Albania, accused the Yugoslav press of a disinformation campaign against Kosovo Albanians and said that the riots were caused by the "great backwardness of this region, the poverty and misery of the people living there, the lack of democratic freedoms and political rights". The riots were caused not by foreign interference but by Yugoslav policies, but the newspaper concluded that Albania would stand side-by-side with Yugoslavia in the event of an attack by "imperialism [the capitalist states headed by the United States] or social imperialism [the communist states headed by the Soviet Union]". Fazliu responded to the Albanian press analysis by accusing Albania of foreign interference.

According to scholar Dejan Jović, "It is today widely argued that the Yugoslav crisis began with the Albanian demonstrations in Kosovo in Spring 1981." The League of Communists of Serbia (LCS) feared that the riots would lead to a separate Kosovan republic or increased autonomy for the province. Tihomir Vlaškalić, the president of the LCS Central Committee, accused the rioters of counter-revolutionary activities "directed against all nations and nationalities in Kosovo". Vlaškalić found sympathy for his view in the other republics. Macedonian state-Presidency representative Lazar Koliševski believed that failures by local leadership caused the riots, and League of Communists of Slovenia Central Committee president France Popit blamed "economic nationalism". At the 20th Session of the Central Committee of the 11th Congress, held on 6 and 7 May 1981, Presidency of the Socialist Republic of Serbia president Dobrivoje Vidić accused Albanian communist leader Enver Hoxha of inspiring the riots with his 8 November 1978 statements on Kosovo's place in Yugoslavia. Hoxha said that Albanians in Yugoslavia were more numerous than two Yugoslav republics together, that they were one nation, which was deliberately divided between two republics and one province and that the Albanians in Yugoslavia had no constitutional rights.

At a 6 May 1981 session of the LCS Central Committee, the Serbian party (influenced by Draža Marković) sought to end decentralisation reforms resulting from the 1974 Yugoslav constitution. They said that a move in this direction would be strengthening Serbian control of its two autonomous provinces, Kosovo and Vojvodina. Marković told the Central Committee that the relationship between Serbia and its autonomous provinces was "clearly unconstitutional." The problem for the Serbian leadership was that the other republics and Kosovo and Vojvodina did not consider the decentralisation of state authority as threatening Yugoslavia's existence; they believed the contrary, that continued decentralisation was the correct way forward. Popit accused the LCS of being under the control of anti-Communist forces, raising the possibility of the LCY Central Committee and its presidency changing the composition of Serbian party leadership.

== Preparations and delegations ==
The 13th Session of the Central Committee of the 11th Congress, held on 29 September 1980, announced that the 12th Congress would be convened in June 1982. In the decision, the LCY Central Committee also prescribed electoral rules and how to nominate candidates. The Central Committee's 25th Session, on 8–9 April 1982, adopted the agenda and the date for the congress: 26–29 June 1982. The draft work report, draft amendments and draft resolutions were also made public before the congress.

With the date of the 12th Congress set, the conferences and congresses of the LCY constitutive branches convened to discuss policies and elect delegates and members of the Central Committee, Commission for Statutory Questions, and the Supervisory Commission of the LCY. The 13th Provincial Conference of the League of Communists of Kosovo, held on 25–26 April 1982, criticised nationalism and adopted a resolution which said, "The Kosovo communists will also in the future decisively oppose the nationalistic slogan 'Kosovo—A Republic' as a reactionary slogan aimed at wrecking togetherness [...] They will fight against all migration trends." The 7th Congress of the League of Communists of Macedonia, held on 25–27 April 1982, criticised "Bulgarian chauvinism". The branches elected a total of 1,570 delegates, fewer than the 11th Congress, in which 2,092 delegates were elected. The reduction of delegates was due to the country's deepening economic crisis and was intended to keep the costs of the congress down. The numbers of delegates, and from which electoral unit they were elected, are shown in the table below.

Delegates to the 12th Congress of the LCY
Branch	Membership	Elected delegates	Branch delegates	Total
Federal employees	15,885	8	0	8
League of Communists of Bosnia and Herzegovina	366,192	198	60	258
League of Communists of Croatia	364,822	182	60	242
League of Communists of Kosovo	95,968	48	40	88
League of Communists of Macedonia	147,930	75	60	135
League of Communists of Montenegro	78,042	39	60	99
League of Communists of Serbia	618,218	309	60	369
League of Communists of Slovenia	132,408	66	60	106
League of Communists of Vojvodina	234,017	117	40	157
Yugoslav People's Army	114,962	58	30	88
Total	2,198,144	1,100	470	1,570

In addition to the delegates, 355 guests and 118 foreign delegations attended the 12th Congress; ten governing communist parties sent delegations. The stature of these delegations was lower; general secretary of the Central Committee of the Communist Party of the Soviet Union Leonid Brezhnev normally attended the congress of his European sister parties, and it was common for other European communist leaders to do the same. Compared to the foreign delegations to other communist party congresses, the Soviet delegation was low-ranking; Vasily Kuznetsov was a candidate (a non-voting member) of the Politburo of the 26th Congress of the Communist Party of the Soviet Union. A number of non-communist parties were represented as well (such as the French Socialist Party) and several delegations from non-ruling communist parties such as the Finnish Communist Party and the Communist Party of Greece.

Delegations of ruling communist parties
Party	Delegation head	Position
Bulgarian Communist Party	Kiril Zarev	Secretariat member
Chinese Communist Party	Peng Zhen	Politburo member
Communist Party of Cuba	Osvaldo Dorticós Torrado	Politburo member
Communist Party of Czechoslovakia	Karel Hoffmann	Presidium member
Communist Party of the Soviet Union	Vasily Kuznetsov	Politburo candidate
Hungarian Socialist Workers’ Party	Miklós Ovári	Politburo member
Mongolian People's Revolutionary Party	Paavangiyn Damdin	Secretariat member
Polish United Workers' Party	Kazimierz Barcikowski	Politburo member
Romanian Communist Party	Emil Bobu	Permanent Bureau member
Socialist Unity Party of Germany	Alfred Neumann	Politburo candidate

== Proceedings ==
=== Agenda ===
1. Election of the Working Presidency
2. Verification of delegates
3. Report on the work of central organs between the 11th Congress and 12th Congresses
  1. Central Committee
    1. Delivered by Dušan Dragosavac, president of the Presidency of the LCY Central Committee
  2. Commission on Statutory Questions
  3. Supervisory Commission
4. Discussion of work reports
5. Election of congressional commissions
  1. Commission for the Development of Socialist Self-Management Socio-Economic Relations, Economic and Social Development and Economic Stabilisation
  2. Commission for the Development of the Political System of Socialist Self-Managed Democracy
  3. Commission for the Organisational Development of the League of Communists, Ideological and Political Training, Organisational Issues and Personnel Policy
  4. Commission for Current Issues in Education, Science and Culture
  5. Commission for International Relations, Opportunities in the Workers', Communist and Progressive Struggle, Cooperation Between the League of Communists of Yugoslavia and the Foreign Policy of Yugoslavia
  6. Commission for the Preparation of National Defence and Social Self-Protection
6. Discussion by the commissions of the future tasks of the LCY and draft documents of the 12th Congress
7. Adoption of resolutions and amendment of the LCY Statute
8. Verification of the election of the organs of the LCY

=== Central Committee work report ===
The work report of the LCY Central Committee was presented by Dušan Dragosavac, outgoing president of the Presidency of the LCY Central Committee, and focused on Yugoslavia's mounting economic difficulties. Dragosavac said, "Our economic policy has neither reacted in a timely nor effective manner to some negative trends in our economic life." It was admitted that the economic policies adopted at the 11th Congress in 1978 were insufficient and unrealistic. Dragosavac noted that economic investment and consumption had increased faster than disposable income, concluding that high inflation had devalued productive work in the eyes of the working class. He concluded that foreign debt had continued to increase and, by extension, Yugoslavia's economic deficit; the country's foreign debt was $20,100 million. According to scholar Jens Reuter, "Dragosavac limited his remarks to an analysis of the past, without developing a program for future economic policy."

The report was less vague about the "Kosovo problem", repeating the most important points of the Political Platform for Action by the League of Communists of Yugoslavia in Developing Socialist Self-management, Brotherhood, Unity, and Fellowship in Kosovo adopted at the 22nd Session of the Central Committee of the 11th Congress on 17 November 1981. The platform was documented at the 12th Congress. The LCY Central Committee (through Dragosavac) repeated its long-standing accusation against the former leadership of the League of Communists of Kosovo (LCK) that they "objectively contributed to the strengthening of Albanian nationalism and irredentism".

Despite primarily blaming the Kosovo leadership, the LCY Central Committee also accused communist Albania of interfering in the province and fomenting Albanian nationalism. Discussing the report, the delegates focused on the forced expulsion of Montenegrins and Serbs from Kosovo. LCY Central Committee member Jože Smole told the congress, "The expulsion of Serbs and Montenegrins from Kosovo under nationalist pressure is a tragedy of its own kind and an extremely worrying matter. I think we all agree that we cannot allow the forcible expulsion of a people or ethnic group in a socialist country. Accordingly, this problem deserves special attention, especially since it is linked to the problem of the fight against all nationalities. Because in the fight against Albanian nationalism, it must be ensured in any case that Serbian or any other nationalism does not break through or that the Albanian people are not disrespected." LCK delegate Fadilj Ćuranoli agreed with Smole's assessment and supported the LCY Central Committee's policies: "[T]he counter-revolutionary forces have not been completely defeated; they are still active and are spreading the slogans 'Republican status for Kosovo', 'For an ethnically pure Kosovo' and numerous other slogans and pamphlets. They are particularly active when it comes to putting pressure on members of the Serbian and Montenegrin nationality and maintaining the tense situation in Kosovo." Despite the focus on problems in Kosovo, no new policies were announced.

The Central Committee also focused on Yugoslavia's relations with other communist states, chiefly those in Europe. It criticised communist Bulgaria for its position on the Macedonian issue: Bulgaria's refusal to recognise their Macedonian minority, which hampered warm mutual relations. The report also referred to martial law in communist Poland, saying that it again indicated the importance of instituting policies that produced social transformation, openness and public discussions "without labelling and qualifying statements" in communist states. The LCY and Yugoslavia's relationship with other communist states and ruling parties were "undergoing a serious crisis", and the LCY intended to taking a separate road to the construction of socialism: "The various paths to socialism are not mere theoretical assumptions, an accident or peripheral characteristic of the process of deep-seated social change [but] a law for the socialist march forward ... [the LCY seeks] varied and fruitful co-operation with the widest possible circle of communist, socialist social democratic parties, liberation movements and other progressive and democratic parties and movements in the world."

Dragosavac informed the congress that the LCY Central Committee condemned the Israeli attacks on Palestinian forces in Lebanon, saying that they "[run] counter to the principles of the United Nations Charter and the wishes of the entire international community" and are "a brutal attack on the independence and territorial integrity of a peace-loving member state of the United Nations, and the genocide of the Palestinian people." The LCY called for an end to the Iran–Iraq War, halting foreign involvement in Afghanistan and Kampuchea, advocating a peaceful resolution to the Cyprus problem, and supporting the peaceful reunification of Korea. The delegates were informed that Yugoslavia supported Zimbabwe's independence and the Namibian liberation struggle.

=== Commissions ===
The six congressional commissions reached a number of conclusions. The Commission for the Development of Socialist Self-Management Socio-Economic Relations, Economic and Social Development and Economic Stabilisation called for a domestic economy relying more on domestic resources. It called for the development of a domestic energy infrastructure, replacing imported energy with domestic resources. The commission also called for increased investment in agriculture and animal husbandry, more attention to Yugoslavia's tourism industry, and integrating the domestic economy with the world market by ensuring the convertibility of the Yugoslav dinar.

The Commission for the Development of the Political System of Socialist Self-Managed Democracy wanted to strengthen decision-making in the socialist self-management system by devolving decision-making authority to the Basic Organisation of Associated Work and neighbourhood organisations. It also sought to strengthen the delegate system, in which a group of citizens (or workers) elect a delegation to represent their interests and concerns; the delegation elects representatives to relevant state organs. The commission advocated improving collective leadership and individual responsibility, improving equality for each nationality (and nation), reducing inefficiency in the decision-making process, and minimising bureaucracy and nationalism with a focus on the situation in Kosovo. The Commission for the Preparation of National Defence and Social Self-Protection advocated strengthening local defence mobilisation and increasing popular awareness of the need to resist foreign aggression.

The Commission for Current Issues in Education, Science and Culture sought to improve assistance for cultural, scientific, and educational institutions in self-management, calling for minimal state intervention in the internal operations of the institutions. The Commission for the Organisational Development of the League of Communists, Ideological and Political Training, Organisational Issues and Personnel Policy reaffirmed democratic centralism (an organisational principle of communist parties and most communist states), increasing worker participation in the LCY, improving Marxist education of members, and called for opposing voices challenging the socialist self-management system. The Commission for International Relations, Opportunities in the Workers', Communist and Progressive Struggle, Cooperation Between the League of Communists of Yugoslavia and the Foreign Policy of Yugoslavia, reaffirmed Yugoslavia's non-aligned foreign policy.

=== Resolutions ===
The congress adopted four resolutions:

1. "On the Role and Tasks of the League of Communists of Yugoslavia in the Struggle for the Development of Socialist Self-Management and for Material and Social Progress of the Country" (economics)
2. "On the Tasks of the League of Communists of Yugoslavia in the Implementation of the Policy of Economic Stabilisation"
3. "The League of Communists of Yugoslavia in the Struggle for Peace, Equal International Cooperation and Socialism in the World
4. "On the Occasion of the Israeli Aggression Against Lebanon"

The economic resolution and the stabilisation programme referred to findings of the Kraigher Commission, the Commission for Questions of Economic Stabilisation of the Federal Social Council for Economic Development and Economic Policy. Both resolutions were vague compromises, with few policy recommendations.

The resolution condemning Israeli aggression said, "The 12th LCY Congress, expressing the mood of all working people and citizens of the SFRY, most severely censures Israel's aggression against independent and nonaligned Lebanon and the genocide of the Lebanese and Palestinian population. It calls most resolutely for the unconditional withdrawal of the Israeli aggressor." It accused Israel of blindness to its own aggression "to such an extent that [it] cannot perceive the consequences of his acts which can be catastrophic for Israel itself." The congress appealed to the international community and "progressive peace-loving forces" to back the Palestinian people's right to self-determination and support the Palestine Liberation Organisation (PLO). PLO leader Yasser Arafat sent a telegram to the congress wishing it success which was received with "prolonged applause".

=== LCY statute amendment ===
The congress amended the LCY statute in accordance with the decisions of the 11th Session of the Central Committee of the 11th Congress. The more radical proposals formulated by Tito at the 11th Congress and afterwards were not adopted. Instead of adopting term limits for every LCY office, the amendments regulated the league's central organs. The amendments allowed the LCY's republican congresses to make their own rules. This was a breach of the collective-leadership system envisioned by Tito, increasing the powers of the LCY constitutive branches at the expense of the central organs. Supporters of this amendment noted that the LCY constitutive branches already had term limits, and there was no reason to stipulate this in the LCY statute. Despite this, it was decided to review the 12th Congress's decision on mandates at the 13th Congress in 1986. Delegates voted to set a non-renewable one-year term limit for the president of the LCY Presidency, a two-year limit for the secretary of the LCY Presidency, and a four-year limit for executive secretaries.

Several proposals were voted down. League of Communists of Serbia (LCS) delegate Bogdan Crnobrjna proposed clear accountability rules for the central party organs. He proposed recall for all officeholders, an extraordinary congress when the LCY Central Committee and the Presidency failed to implement adopted policies, and secret ballots and more candidates than seats in all elections. Crnobrjna's proposal echoed Tito's at the 11th Congress in 1978, and the 12th Congress instituted secret ballots in all intra-party elections. The proposal for multi-candidate elections, which Tito had called for in 1978, was changed to allow the party organ in question to nominate more candidates than seats. In an election with more candidates than seats, the person with the most votes was elected. According to Jens Reuter, "[A]ll proposals for significant changes to the party statutes were blocked." The congress agreed that the practice of convening a party conference should be extended to the LCY branches.

Although the congress did not accept Crnobrjna's accountability proposals, it strengthened the Central Committee's control of the Presidency. Unlike the Presidency, where decisions could only be reached unanimously, decisions were made by vote during Central Committee sessions. This move was in light of the 12th Congress's strengthening of democratic centralism. Branko Mikulić, a member of the outgoing Presidency from the League of Communists of Bosnia and Herzegovina who chaired the 12th Congress' Commission for Statutory Amendments, called for the delegates to reaffirm democratic centralism by quoting Tito: "Democratic centralism will remain in future, too, the basic principle of the internal relationships, organisation, and the total activity of the League of Communists of Yugoslavia."

The son of revolutionaries Dragica and Rade Končar, LCS New Belgrade Party Organisation delegate Rade Končar attacked what he perceived as LCY federalisation. He proposed strengthening the party centre and creating party organisations based on industrial principles – party organisations for railway workers, for example, instead of ethnic organisations. Končar said that "he was not against the republics", but "against a statehood that hinders self-management and undermines the unity of our common state, the Socialist Federal Republic of Yugoslavia." He was accused of supporting a "unitarist" model in which federal authorities could overpower the republics and autonomous provinces. In his defence, Končar told the congress, "Do not hold it against me – hold me responsible – but I do not accept, I do not agree with the federalisation of the party in any of its forms." Mikulić argued against Končar's proposal, saying that creating primary organisations in technocratic-managerial structures could subjugate the LCY to their self-interest and hurt socialist self-management. Končar received some support, but Mikulić's defence of the organisational structure was met with "standing ovations from the delegates". According to a media release, Končar's proposal was rejected "categorically and very sharply".

=== Verification and elections ===
The congress verified the 163-member Central Committee, the 24-member Commission on Statutory Questions and the 15-member Supervisory Commission, which had been elected at the congresses and conferences of the LCY's branches, on 29 June. Ninety-five new members (58.3 percent) were elected to the Central Committee. Of these, 80.4 percent had a tertiary education and 55.2 percent were professional party cadres. Nearly 10 percent of the new members had a military background. Thirteen were workers, 18 were technical specialists or scientists, and 25 were managers. Women made up 9.2 percent (15 members) of the total. Thirteen members (7.9 percent) were age 30 or younger, 47 (28.9 percent) were 31 to 50 years old, 16 (9.8 percent) were 51 to 55, and 87 (53.4 percent of the total) were 56 or older. Fifty-two members (31.9 percent) were Serbs, 22 (13.5 percent) were Croats, eight (4.9 percent) were Muslims, 22 (13.5 percent) were Slovenes, 13 (eight percent) were Albanians, 18 (11 percent) were Macedonians, 19 (11.7 percent) were Montenegrins, three (1.8 percent) were Hungarians, and four (2.4 percent) self-identified as Yugoslav. Two non-identified minorities were also represented. Given the LCY's overall membership composition, Serbs, Croats, Muslims and self-identified Yugoslavs were underrepresented on the Central Committee; Slovenes, Montenegrins, Macedonians and Albanians were over-represented. Dobroslav Ćulafić, the secretary of the LCY Presidency, announced the verification results.

Shortly after its verification, the 1st Session of the Central Committee of the 12th Congress convened to elect a Presidency. Dušan Dragosavac, outgoing president of the presidency, presided over the session. Draža Marković, an official from the Serbian branch, first failed to receive the necessary two-thirds of votes; he received 95 votes, 12 short of election. Branko Mikulić organised the opposition to Marković, collaborating with Dragosavac and LCY branches.

With the failure to get Marković elected, Dragosavac asked the Serbian branch to nominate another candidate. Marković's nomination had been criticised by the League of Communists of Kosovo and the League of Communists of Vojvodina (an internal organisation of the Serbian branch), and segments of the Leagues of Communists of Bosnia and Herzegovina and Croatia also opposed his nomination; it was known that the Serbian branch planned to nominate him as president of the LCY Presidency in 1983. Marković's opponents wanted the Serbian branch to nominate Miloš Minić, who was (according to scholar Dejan Jović) "enormously popular outside Serbia, but equally unpopular in Serbia". The Serbian branch wanted a representative who could promote and defend Serbian interests as a result of the troubles in Kosovo, and did not feel that Minić could do this. Dragosavac said in an interview after Yugoslavia's collapse, "[The nomination of Marković ...] was unacceptable to all [the other branches]."

The Serbian branch immediately opposed the move to nominate another candidate. Petar Stambolić, a Central Committee member from Serbia and president of the Presidency of the SFRY, said that the vote was unacceptable to Serbia. He accused the other branches of "flagrant interference in the internal affairs of Serbia", and threatened to resign. Marković told the session after Stambolić's speech that he did not consider opposition a personal matter, but as a struggle about how the other Yugoslav republics viewed Serbia. He resigned from the Central Committee, saying that he "did not want to be a member of the Yugoslav Party Central Committee as long as such views existed." Radenko Puzović, a member of the newly elected Central Committee from Serbia, questioned Serbian involvement in the LCY Central Committee: "The 19 members of the League of Communists of Serbia should also reevaluate – do we have a place in the Central Committee of the League of Communists of Yugoslavia?"

Concerned about an internal party split, Federal Executive Council president Milka Planinc and president of the Presidency of the Central Committee of the League of Communists of Croatia Jure Bilić proposed a new vote during a break between sessions and guaranteed that Marković would be elected. Marković accepted the offer, Minić withdrew his candidacy, and Marković was elected to the Presidency. Although the Serbian branch considered this a victory, it increased their future isolation within the LCY. The 1st Session elected 14 individuals to the Presidency (two from each republic, one from each province and one representative from the military). The new presidency convened to elect the new president of the Presidency: Mitja Ribičič. Ćulafić informed the congress of the election results, and Ribičič delivered closing remarks.

== Aftermath ==
The congress was widely criticised in the Yugoslav press. Commentary in NIN concluded, "The congress is over, but the problems remain." Serbian academic Mihajlo Popović criticised its documents for being "so pale and abstract that one could not immediately decide from cursory reading whether it was a resolution of the 10th, 11th or 12th congress. The resolutions were drafted in such a way that they override all differences of opinion that existed in practice among the communists and especially among their leaders." Popović accused high-standing leaders of discussing topics in a way making it impossible for outsiders to understand what a debate was about or the political differences between officials and concluded, "The [adopted] resolution[s] and similar political documents do not provide an answer to [difficult questions facing Yugoslavia]. And there will not be any as long as resolutions are written in such a way that everyone can agree with them, even if they hold different political views." According to journalist Marvin Howe, however, congress delegates "termed it the freest convention that the League of Communists has held, with open, heated debates and much self-criticism."

Scholar Robert Miller concluded that "The LCY, in theory, the principal integrative force in society, has continued to fracture along republican-ethnic lines" at the congress, but "The failure [...] to come down decisively against autonomist impulses in the republican and provincial party organisation may ultimately prove to have been a mark of political maturity rather than weakness." Croat political scientist Dejan Jović said that the 12th Congress and the debacle of Draža Marković's election produced a situation where "The Yugoslav republics (including Serbia) were much more interested in protecting their sovereignty than in developing a Yugoslav political centre as an arbiter in political conflicts in the country. [...] The events following it clearly showed that the system had no means to resolve a stalemate."
