= 12th Politburo =

12th Politburo may refer to:

- 12th Politburo of the Chinese Communist Party
- 12th Politburo of the Communist Party of Vietnam
- 12th Politburo of the League of Communists of Yugoslavia
- Politburo of the 12th Congress of the Russian Communist Party (Bolsheviks)
