= Secretary of the Presidency of the League of Communists of Slovenia =

Administrative leader of the League of Communists of Slovenia

- Slovene: Sekretar predsedstva Zveze komunistov Slovenije
- Emblems of the LCY

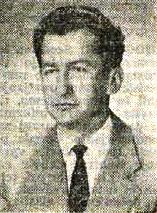
- Longest serving Franc Šetinc; 19 December 1972 – 30 July 1982
- Type: Chief of staff
- Member of: ZKS Presidency
- Appointer: ZKS Presidency
- Term length: Two to four years, renewable (1966–1990)
- Constituting instrument: LCY Charter & ZKS Charter
- Formation: 17 October 1966
- First holder: France Popit
- Final holder: Sonja Lokar
- Abolished: 27 October 1990

The secretary was the highest administrative leader of the Presidency of the Central Committee of the League of Communists of Slovenia (ZKS), the ruling party of the Socialist Republic of Slovenia (SR Slovenia) in the Socialist Federal Republic of Yugoslavia and a branch of the League of Communists of Yugoslavia (LCY). The officeholder was elected by and answerable to the ZKS Presidency.

== Office history ==
Title	Established	Abolished	Established by
Secretary of the Executive Bureau of the Central Committee of the League of Communists of Slovenia; Slovene: Sekretar Izvršnega biroja Centralnega komiteja Zveze komunistov Slovenije	17 October 1966	5 April 1974	6th Plenary Session of the Central Committee of the ZKS 5th Congress
Secretary of the Executive Committee of the Central Committee of the League of Communists of Slovenia; Slovenian: Sekretar Izvršnega komiteja Centralnega komiteja Zveze komunistov Slovenije	5 April 1974	30 July 1982	7th Congress of the League of Communists of Slovenia
Secretary of the Presidency of the Central Committee of the League of Communists of Slovenia; Slovenian: Sekretar predsedstva Centralnega komiteja Zveze komunistov Slovenije	30 July 1982	27 October 1990	9th Congress of the League of Communists of Slovenia

== Officeholders ==
Secretaries of the Presidency of the Central Committee of the League of Communists of Slovenia
No.	Name	Took office	Left office	Tenure	Term of office	Birth	PM	Death	Ref.
1	France Popit	17 October 1966	11 December 1968	2 years, 55 days	5th (1965–1968)	1921	1940	2013	
2	Andrej Marinc	11 December 1968	19 December 1972	4 years, 8 days	6th (1968–1974)	1930	1947	2025	
3	Franc Šetinc	19 December 1972	30 July 1982	9 years, 101 days	6th–8th (1968–1982)	1929	1948	2016	
4	Miha Ravnik	30 July 1982	19 April 1986	3 years, 263 days	9th (1982–1986)	1938	1957	2021	
5	Miloš Prosenc	19 April 1986	23 December 1989	3 years, 248 days	10th (1986–1989)	1938	1958	Alive	
6	Sonja Lokar	23 December 1989	27 October 1990	308 days	11th (1989–1990)	1948	1966	Alive	

== Bibliography ==
- Staff writer (1982). Politički i poslovni imenik [Political and Business Directory] (in Serbo-Croatian). Tanjug.
- Stanković, Slobodan (1981). The End of the Tito Era: Yugoslavia's Dilemmas. Hoover International Studies. ISBN 9780817973629.
- Stroynowski, Juliusz, ed. (1989a). Who's Who in the Socialist Countries of Europe: A–H. K. G. Saur Verlag. ISBN 3-598-10719-6.
- Stroynowski, Juliusz, ed. (1989b). Who's Who in the Socialist Countries of Europe: I–O. K. G. Saur Verlag. ISBN 3-598-10719-6.
- Stroynowski, Juliusz, ed. (1989c). Who's Who in the Socialist Countries of Europe: P–Z. K. G. Saur Verlag. ISBN 3-598-10719-6.
