= Federal Council for Protection of the Constitutional Order (Yugoslavia) =

Yugoslavian governmental agency

Federal Council for Protection of the Constitutional Order (Serbo-Croatian: Savezni sav(j)et za zaštitu ustavnog poretka, Slovene: Zvezni svet za zaščito ustavne ureditve, Macedonian: Сојузниот совет за заштита на уставниот поредок) was an agency of the Presidency of the Socialist Federal Republic of Yugoslavia in charge of coordination of country's internal security institutions. It was created in 1975, in accordance with Article 331 of the 1974 Yugoslav Constitution, and ceased to exist following the breakup of Yugoslavia in 1991–1992.

The council had eight members. Four members were appointed directly by the Presidency: three out of its own members and one out of the leadership of the League of Communists of Yugoslavia. The other members were Yugoslav prime minister, ministers of interior, national defense and foreign affairs. The chairmen of the council since its creation were:

- Vladimir Bakarić (1975–1982)
- Lazar Koliševski (1982–1984)
- Stane Dolanc (1984–1989)
- Janez Drnovšek (1989)
- Borisav Jović (1989–1991)

== Members ex officio ==
President of the Executive Council
| Name | Term |
| Džemal Bijedić | 1975 – 18 January 1977 |
| Veselin Đuranović | 18 January 1977 – 16 May 1982 |
| Milka Planinc | 16 May 1982 – 15 May 1986 |
| Branko Mikulić | 15 May 1986 – 16 March 1989 |
| Ante Marković | 16 March 1989 – 1991 |
Federal Secretary for Internal Affairs
| Name | Term |
| Franjo Herljević | 1975 – 16 May 1982 |
| Stane Dolanc | 16 May 1982 – 15 May 1984 |
| Dobroslav Ćulafić | 15 May 1984 – 16 May 1989 |
| Petar Gračanin | 16 May 1989 – 1991 |
Federal Secretary for People's Defense
| Name | Term |
| Nikola Ljubičić | 1975 – 5 May 1982 |
| Branko Mamula | 5 May 1982 – 15 May 1988 |
| Veljko Kadijević | 15 May 1988 – 1991 |
Federal Secretary for Foreign Affairs
| Name | Term |
| Miloš Minić | 1975 – 17 May 1978 |
| Josip Vrhovec | 17 May 1978 – 17 May 1982 |
| Lazar Mojsov | 17 May 1982 – 15 May 1984 |
| Raif Dizdarević | 15 May 1984 – 30 December 1987 |
| Budimir Lončar | 30 December 1987 – 1991 |
