= 11th Politburo =

11th Politburo may refer to:

- 11th Politburo of the Chinese Communist Party
- Politburo of the 11th Congress of the Russian Communist Party (Bolsheviks)
- 11th Politburo of the Communist Party of Czechoslovakia
- 11th Politburo of the Socialist Unity Party of Germany
- 11th Politburo of the Polish United Workers' Party
- 11th Politburo of the Romanian Communist Party
- 11th Politburo of the Lao People's Revolutionary Party
- 11th Politburo of the Communist Party of Vietnam
- 11th Politburo of the League of Communists of Yugoslavia
- 11th Politburo of the Hungarian Socialist Workers' Party
