= 10th Politburo =

10th Politburo may refer to:

- 10th Politburo of the Chinese Communist Party
- Politburo of the 10th Congress of the Russian Communist Party (Bolsheviks)
- 10th Politburo of the Party of Labour of Albania
- 11th Politburo of the Communist Party of Czechoslovakia
- 10th Politburo of the Socialist Unity Party of Germany
- 10th Politburo of the Polish United Workers' Party
- 10th Politburo of the Romanian Communist Party
- 10th Politburo of the Lao People's Revolutionary Party
- 10th Politburo of the Communist Party of Vietnam
- 10th Politburo of the League of Communists of Yugoslavia
- 10th Politburo of the Hungarian Socialist Workers' Party
