= University of Donja Gorica =

Private university in Podgorica, Montenegro

- Motto: Budite dio istorije budućnosti!
- Type: Private
- Established: 2007; 19 years ago
- Affiliations: Crnogorska studentska liga
- Provost: Đorđije Borozan
- Rector: Veselin Vukotić
- Undergraduates: 3000+
- Postgraduates: 200+
- Location: Donja Gorica bb, 81000 Podgorica, Montenegro; 42.4175°N 19.2028°E
- Campus: Urban
- Colors: Orange & green
- Website: udg.edu.me

The University of Donja Gorica (Montenegrin and Serbian: Univerzitet Donja Gorica / Универзитет Доња Горица), also known as simply UDG, is a private university located in Donja Gorica, a suburb of Podgorica, Montenegro. The university was established in 2007, as the second private university in Montenegro. Its building covers an area of 16,700 m2 and currently represents the largest privately owned facility in the country.

In 2022 UDG became part of the "Powered by Arizona State University" group of universities, through partnership with Cintana Alliance.

== Organization ==
The university comprises the following 13 faculties:

- Faculty of International Economics, Finances and Business
  - Entrepreneurship, Management and Business
- Faculty of Legal Sciences
- Faculty of Information Systems and Technology
- Humanistic Studies
  - Diplomacy
  - Security
  - Communication Studies and Media
- Faculty of Arts
- Polytechnics
- Faculty of Sports Management
- Faculty for Food Technology, Food Safety and Ecology
- Faculty of Design and Multimedia
  - Graphic design
  - Fashion design
- Faculty of Culture and Tourism
  - Chinese studies
- Faculty of Applied Sciences
  - Applied Psychology
  - Applied Mathematics
- International Hotel Management
- English Language and Literature

The Centre for Foreign Languages is also a part of the university.
