= Andrej Marinc =

Slovenian politician (1930–2025)

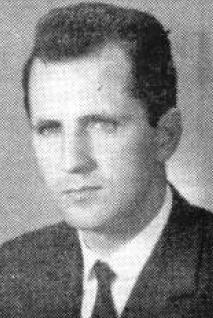

President of the League of Communists of Slovenia Central Committee
- In office July 30, 1982 – April 19, 1986
- Preceded by: France Popit
- Succeeded by: Milan Kučan

President of the Executive Council of the Socialist Republic of Slovenia
- In office November 27, 1972 – May 9, 1978
- Preceded by: Stane Kavčič
- Succeeded by: Anton Vratuša

Secretary of the Executive Committee of the League of Communists of Slovenia
- In office December 11, 1968 – December 19, 1972
- Preceded by: France Popit
- Succeeded by: Franc Šetinc

Personal details
- Born: October 4, 1930 Celje, Drava Banovina, Kingdom of Yugoslavia (now Slovenia)
- Died: September 2025 (aged 94)
- Party: League of Communists of Yugoslavia (joined in 1947)

Andrej Marinc (October 4, 1930 – September 2025) was a Slovenian politician and agronomist who served as the president of the Executive Council of the Socialist Republic of Slovenia from November 27, 1972, to May 9, 1978. He was born in Celje, Slovenia, and he joined the League of Communists of Slovenia in 1947. He was preceded as head of government by Stane Kavčič and succeeded by Anton Vratuša.

Marinc died in September 2025 at the age of 94.

== Bibliography ==
- Stanković, Slobodan (1981). The End of the Tito Era: Yugoslavia's Dilemmas. Hoover International Studies. ISBN 9780817973629.
- Stroynowski, Juliusz, ed. (1989b). Who's Who in the Socialist Countries of Europe: I–O. K. G. Saur Verlag. ISBN 3-598-10719-6.
