= Franjo Herljević =

Bosnian Croat general officer

General Franjo Herljević
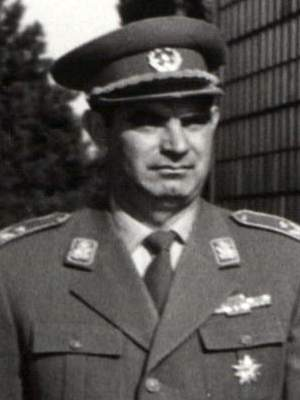
- Herljević in 1958
- Born: 21 June 1915; Tuzla, Bosnia and Herzegovina, Austria-Hungary
- Died: 4 May 1998 (aged 82); Belgrade, Serbia, FR Yugoslavia
- Burial place: Belgrade New Cemetery; 44°48′34″N 20°29′14″E
- Spouse: Desa Herljević
- Military career
- Allegiance: Socialist Federal Republic of Yugoslavia
- Branch: Yugoslav Partisans; Yugoslav People's Army: Yugoslav Ground Forces
- Service years: 1941–1982
- Rank: Colonel General
- Commands: Military Academy (1956–1962)
- Conflicts: World War II in Yugoslavia
- Awards: Order of the People's Hero (20 December 1951)
- Other work: Federal Secretary of Internal Affairs of the SFR Yugoslavia (1974–1982)

Franjo Herljević (21 June 1915 – 4 May 1998) was a Bosnian Croat general of the Yugoslav People's Army (JNA) who served as the Federal Secretary of Internal Affairs of the SFR Yugoslavia (SFRJ) from 17 May 1974 to 16 May 1982. He also served as a member of the Federal Council for Protection of the Constitutional Order from 1975 to 1984.

Herljević joined the League of Communist Youth of Yugoslavia (SKOJ) in 1932 and the Communist Party of Yugoslavia (KPJ) in 1940. He participated in the Partisan resistance movement during World War II in Yugoslavia. Afterwards, he studied at the Frunze Military Academy in the Soviet Union, graduating in 1948.

Government offices
Preceded by Luka Banović	Federal Secretary of Internal Affairs of the SFR Yugoslavia; 17 May 1974 – 16 May 1982	Succeeded by Stane Dolanc
Military offices
Preceded by Milan Šakić	Chief of the Military Academy; 1956–1962	Succeeded by Đuro Dulić
