= President of the League of Communists of Montenegro =

Leader of the League of Communists of Montenegro

- Serbo-Croatian: Predsjednik Saveza komunista Crne Gore
- Emblems of the LCY

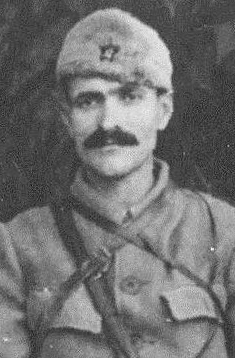
- Longest serving Blažo Jovanović; 7 October 1948 – 29 June 1963
- Type: Party leader
- Member of: LCY Presidency and SRM Presidency
- Appointer: Central Committee
- Term length: Two years, non-renewable (1982–1991)
- Constituting instrument: LCY Charter & LCM Charter
- Formation: 7 October 1948
- First holder: Blažo Jovanović
- Final holder: Momir Bulatović
- Abolished: 22 June 1991

The president was the leader of the League of Communists of Montenegro (LCM), the ruling party of the Socialist Republic of Montenegro (SRM) in the Socialist Federal Republic of Yugoslavia. Party rules stipulated that the LCM Central Committee elected the president. Moreover, the Central Committee was empowered to remove the president. The president served ex officio as a member of the Presidency of the Central Committee of the League of Communists of Yugoslavia (LCY) and of the SRM Presidency. To be eligible to serve, the president had to be a member of the Presidency of the LCM Central Committee. The 8th LCM Congress instituted a two-year term limits for officeholders.

The office traces its lineage back to the office of "Secretary of the Provincial Committee of the Communist Party of Yugoslavia in Montenegro," established on 4 April 1920. This body had no distinct rights and was under the jurisdiction of the Yugoslav Central Committee. On 4 October 1948, the LCY convened the founding congress of the Communist Party of Montenegro. On 7 October, the Central Committee of the 1st Congress elected Blažo Jovanović as "Secretary of the Central Committee of the Communist Party of Montenegro". The LCY 6th Congress on 2–7 November 1952, renamed the party League of Communists, and the Montenegrin republican branch followed suit and changed its name to League of Communists of Montenegro. On 4 October 1966, the 5th Plenary Session of the Central Committee of the LCY 8th Congress abolished the office of General Secretary at the national level and replaced with the office of President. The LCM Central Committee convened a meeting later in 1966 in which the office of secretary was abolished, and the "President of the Central Committee of the League of Communists of Montenegro" was formed. The reforms passed by the LCY Central Committee plenum strengthened the powers of the republican branches and gave more powers to the Montenegrin party leader. The 8th LCM Congress introduced another set of reforms on 1 July 1982, which abolished the existing office and replaced it with the "President of the Presidency of the Central Committee of the League of Communists of Montenegro". This office was retained until 22 June 1991, when the party changed its name to the Democratic Party of Socialists of Montenegro.

== Office history ==
Title	Established	Abolished	Established by
Secretary of the Provincial Committee of the Communist Party of Yugoslavia for Montenegro; Serbo-Croatian: Sekretar Pokrajinskog komiteta Komunističke partije Jugoslavije za Crne Gore	23 April 1919	2 August 1937	1st Congress of the Socialist Labour Party of Yugoslavia (Communists)
Secretary of the Central Committee of the League of Communists of Montenegro; Serbo-Croatian: Sekretar Centralnog komiteta Saveza komunista Crne Gore	2 August 1937	14 November 1966	1st Congress of the Communist Party of Montenegro
President of the Central Committee of the League of Communists of Montenegro; Serbo-Croatian: Predsjednik Centralnog komiteta Saveza komunista Crne Gore	14 November 1966	1 July 1982	7th Plenary Session of the Central Committee of the 4th Congress
President of the Presidency of the Central Committee of the League of Communists of Montenegro; Serbo-Croatian: Predsjednik Predsedništva Centralnog komiteta Saveza komunista Crne Gore	1 July 1982	24 February 1991	8th Congress of the League of Communists of Montenegro

== Officeholders ==
=== Provincial ===
Secretaries of the Provincial Committee of the Communist Party of Yugoslavia for Montenegro
No.	Portrait	Name	Took office	Left office	Term of office	Birth	PM	Death	Ref.
1		Jovan Tomašević	4 April 1920	24 February 1924	3 years, 326 days	1892	1919	1924	
2		Stanko Dragojević	24 February 1924	Late 1924	281 days	1893	1919	1933	
3		Aleksa Pavićević	Late 1924	November 1925	1 year, 203 days	1896	1919	?	
4		Nikola Kovačević	November 1925	20 February 1928	2 years, 111 days	1890	1920	1964	
5		Nisa Milanović	21 October 1928	31 July 1929	283 days	1894	1920	?	
6		Adolf Muk	July 1930	October 1930	92 days	1893	1919	1943	
7		Božo Ljumović	October 1932	30 August 1934	1 year, 333 days	1896	1919	1986	
8		Nikola Lekić	30 August 1934	July 1936	1 year, 306 days	1909	1931	1941	
7		Božo Ljumović	9 August 1940	1942	1 year, 296 days	1907	1924	1976	
9		Blažo Jovanović	May 1943	7 October 1948	5 years, 159 days	1907	1924	1976	

=== Republican ===
Presidents of the League of Communists of Montenegro
No.	Portrait	Name	Took office	Left office	Tenure	Term of office	Birth	PM	Death	Ref.
1		Blažo Jovanović	7 October 1948	29 June 1963	14 years, 265 days	1st–3rd (1948–1965)	1907	1924	1976	
2		Đorđije Pajković	29 June 1963	14 December 1968	5 years, 168 days	3rd–4th (1959–1968)	1917	1936	1980	
3		Veselin Đuranović	14 December 1968	21 March 1977	8 years, 97 days	5th–6th (1968–1978)	1925	1944	1997	
4		Vojislav Srzentić	21 March 1977	1 July 1982	5 years, 102 days	6th–7th (1974–1982)	1934	1952	Alive	
5		Dobroslav Ćulafić	1 July 1982	May 1984	1 year, 305 days	8th (1982–1986)	1926	1944	2011	
6		Vidoje Žarković	May 1984	30 July 1984	90 days	8th (1982–1986)	1927	1943	2000	
7		Marko Orlandić	30 July 1984	23 April 1986	1 year, 267 days	8th (1982–1986)	1930	1948	2019	
8		Miljan Radović	23 April 1986	12 January 1989	2 years, 264 days	9th (1986–1989)	1933	1951	2015	
9		Veselin Vukotić	12 January 1989	26 April 1989	104 days	9th (1986–1989)	1949	?	Alive	
10		Milica Pejanović	26 April 1989	28 April 1989	2 days	9th (1986–1989)	1959	?	Alive	
11		Momir Bulatović	28 April 1989	22 June 1991	2 years, 55 days	10th (1989–1991)	1956	?	2019	

== Bibliography ==
=== Books ===
- Djokić, Dejan (2023). A Concise History of Serbia. Cambridge University Press. ISBN 978-1-107-02838-8.
- Djukanović, Bojka (2023). Historical Dictionary of Montenegro. Rowman & Littlefield Publishers. ISBN 9781538139158.
- Lewytzkyj, Borys; Stroynowski, Juliusz, eds. (1978). Who's Who in the Socialist Countries. K. G. Saur Verlag. ISBN 3-7940-3017-6.
- Morrison, Kenneth (2018). Nationalism, Identity and Statehood in Post-Yugoslav Montenegro. Bloomsbury Publishing. ISBN 9781474235204.
- Staff writer, ed. (1969). Šesta sjednica Republičke konferencije SSRN BiH [The Sixth Session of the Republican Conference of the SSRN BiH] (in Serbo-Croatian). Centar za političko informisanje i dokumentaciju.
- Staff writer (1986). Directory of Yugoslav officials: A Reference Aid. Reference aid. University of Michigan.
- Stallaerts, Robert (2010). Historical Dictionary of Croatia. Scarecrow Press. ISBN 9780810873636.
- Stroynowski, Juliusz, ed. (1989a). Who's Who in the Socialist Countries of Europe: A–H. K. G. Saur Verlag. ISBN 3-598-10719-6.
- Stroynowski, Juliusz, ed. (1989b). Who's Who in the Socialist Countries of Europe: I–O. K. G. Saur Verlag. ISBN 3-598-10719-6.
- Stroynowski, Juliusz, ed. (1989c). Who's Who in the Socialist Countries of Europe: P–Z. K. G. Saur Verlag. ISBN 3-598-10719-6.
- Tadić, Aleksandar (1968). Pali za lepša svitanja: Majke heroja pričaju [Lights For More Beautiful dawns: Mothers of Heroes Talk] (in Serbo-Croatian). Međunarodna štampa-Interpress.
- Tito, Josip Broz (1980). The Party of the Revolution: Fifth Conference of the Communist Party of Yugoslavia, 1940. Socialist Thought and Practice.
- Tito, Josip Broz (1982a). Damjanović, Pero; Vujošević, Ubavka (eds.). Sabrana djela [Selected Works] (in Serbo-Croatian). Vol. 3. Komunist.
- Tito, Josip Broz (198b). Damjanović, Pero; Vujošević, Ubavka (eds.). Sabrana djela: Septembar 1939-Septembar 1940 [Selected Works: September 1939 – September 1940] (in Serbo-Croatian). Komunist.
- Vukićević, Boris (2021). "Crnogorski Kadrovi U Diplomatskoj Službi Socijalističke Jugoslavije" [Montenegrin Personnel in the Diplomatic Service of Socialist Yugoslavia] (PDF). Historical Records. Reference aid. 93. Archived from the original (PDF) on 7 September 2023.
- Zalar, Charles, ed. (1961). Yugoslav Communism: A Critical Study. United States Government Printing Office. Archived from the original on 11 June 2023.

=== Websites ===
- "Nikola Kovačević" [Nikola Kovačević] (in Montenegrin). Parliament of Montenegro.
