= Veselin Vukotić (politician) =

Montenegrin economist and politician (born 1949)

Dr.Veselin Vukotić
- Born: August 5, 1949 (age 76); Piperi, FPR Yugoslavia
- Occupation: Rector of University Donja Gorica
- Known for: founder of University Donja Gorica

Veselin Vukotić is a Montenegrin economist, professor, politician, and co-owner of Donja Gorica University. During 1985-1988 he was part of the cabinet of Montenegro's Prime Minister Vuko Vukadinović. He served as a Minister for Privatization and Entrepreneurship in the government of the Socialist Federal Republic of Yugoslavia from 1989 to 1992.
