= President of the League of Communists of Serbia =

Leader of the League of Communists of Serbia

- Serbo-Croatian: Predsednik Saveza komunista Srbije
- Emblems of the LCY

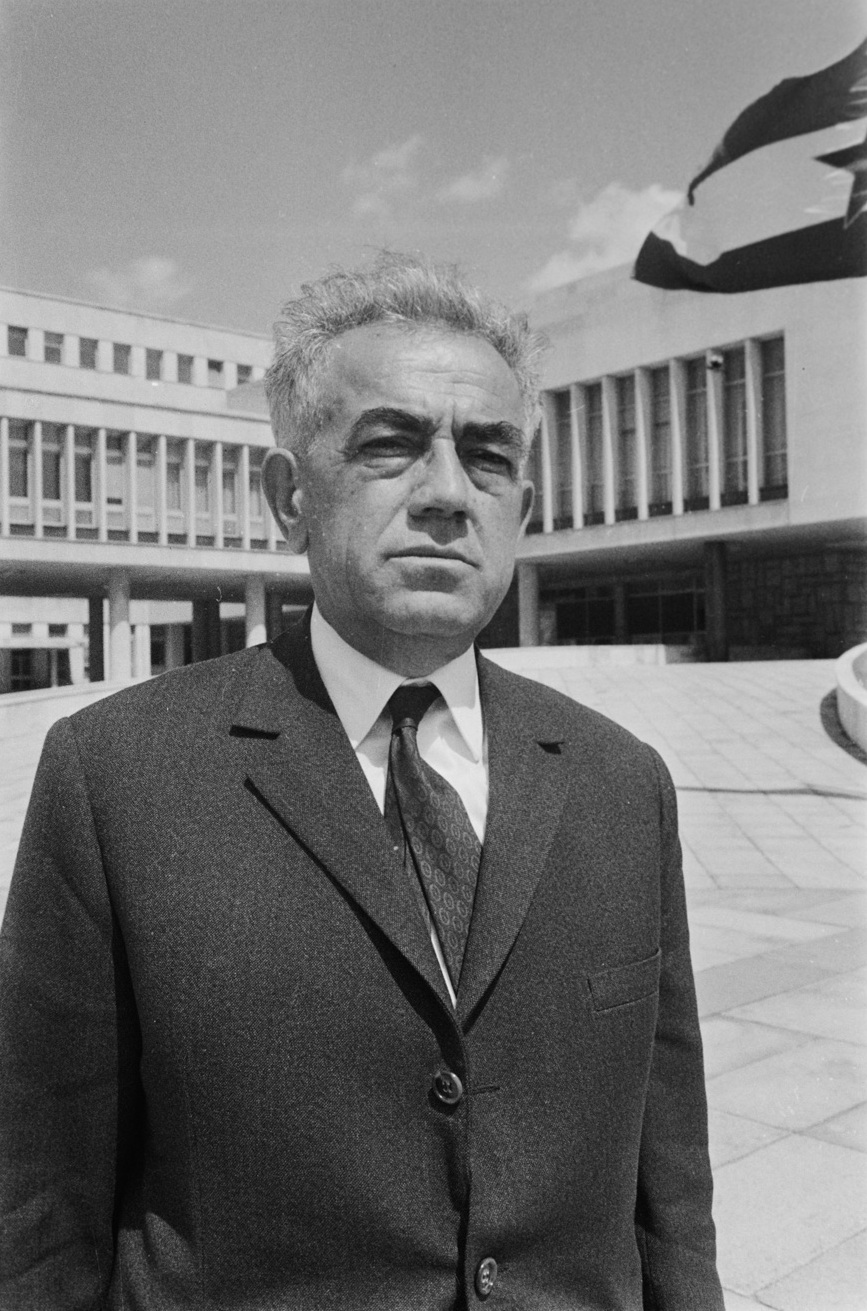
- Longest serving Jovan Veselinov; 30 March 1957 – 4 November 1966
- Type: Party leader
- Member of: LCY Presidency and SRS Presidency
- Appointer: LCS Central Committee
- Term length: One year, renewable once (1982–1991)
- Constituting instrument: LCY Charter & LCS Charter
- Formation: 12 May 1945
- First holder: Blagoje Nešković
- Final holder: Bogdan Trifunović
- Abolished: 16 July 1990

The president was the leader of the League of Communists of Serbia (LCS), the ruling party of the Socialist Republic of Serbia (SRS) in the Socialist Federal Republic of Yugoslavia. Party rules stipulated that the LCS Central Committee elected the president. Moreover, the Central Committee was empowered to remove the president. The president served ex officio as a member of the Presidency of the Central Committee of the League of Communists of Yugoslavia (LCY) and of the SRS Presidency. To be eligible to serve, the president had to be a member of the Presidency of the LCS Central Committee. The 8th LCS Congress instituted a two-year term limits for officeholders.

The office traces its lineage back to the office of "Secretary of the Provincial Committee of the Communist Party of Yugoslavia in Serbia", established after the founding of the LCY in 1919. This body had no distinct rights and was under the jurisdiction of the Yugoslav Central Committee. On 8 May 1945, the LCY convened the founding congress of the Communist Party of Serbia. On 12 May, the Central Committee of the 1st Congress elected Blagoje Nešković as "Secretary of the Central Committee of the Communist Party of Serbia". The LCY 6th Congress on 2–7 November 1952, renamed the party League of Communists, and the Serbian republican branch followed suit and changed its name to League of Communists of Serbia. On 4 October 1966, the 5th Plenary Session of the Central Committee of the LCY 8th Congress abolished the office of General Secretary at the national level and replaced with the office of President. The LCS Central Committee convened a meeting on 4 November 1966 that abolished the office of secretary and established the "President of the Central Committee of the League of Communists of Serbia". The reforms passed by the LCY Central Committee plenum strengthened the powers of the republican branches and gave more powers to the Serbian party leader. The 9th LCS Congress introduced another set of reforms on 29 May 1982, which abolished the existing office and replaced it with the "President of the Presidency of the Central Committee of the League of Communists of Serbia". This office was retained until 30 June 1990, when the party changed its name to the Socialist Party of Serbia on 17 July 1990.

== Office history ==
Title	Established	Abolished	Established by	Ref.
Secretary of the Provincial Committee of the Communist Party of Yugoslavia for Serbia; Serbo-Croatian: Секретар Покрајинског комитета Комунистичке партије Југославије за Србију	23 April 1919	12 May 1945	1st Congress of the Socialist Labour Party of Yugoslavia (Communists)	
Secretary of the Central Committee of the League of Communists of Serbia; Serbo-Croatian: Секретар Централног комитета Савеза комуниста Србије	12 May 1945	4 November 1966	1st Congress of the Communist Party of Serbia	
President of the Central Committee of the League of Communists of Serbia; Serbo-Croatian: Председник Централног комитета Савеза комуниста Србије	4 November 1966	29 May 1982	? Plenary Session of the Central Committee of the 5th Congress	
President of the Presidency of the Central Committee of the League of Communists of Serbia; Serbo-Croatian: Председник Председништва Централног комитета Савеза комуниста Србије	29 May 1982	17 July 1990	9th Congress of the League of Communists of Serbia	

== Officeholders ==
=== Provincial ===
Secretaries of the Provincial Committee of the Communist Party of Yugoslavia for Serbia
No.	Portrait	Name	Took office	Left office	Tenure	Birth	PM	Death	Ref.
1		Ljuba Radovanović	Unclear	February 1929	Unclear	1887	1919	1964	
2		Bracan Bracanović	February 1929	August 1929	181 days	1893	1923	1929	
3		Otokar Keršovani	1929	1930	1 year, 0 days	1902	1928	1941	
4		Petko Miletić	1930	1932	2 years, 0 days	1897	1920	1939	
5		Blagoje Parović	November 1933	30 September 1934	333 days	1903	1923	1937	
6		Trajko Stamenković	30 September 1934	November 1935	1 year, 32 days	1909	1928	1942	
7		Aleksandar Ranković	May 1937	11 September 1941	4 years, 133 days	1909	1928	1983	
8		Blagoje Nešković	11 September 1941	12 May 1945	3 years, 243 days	1907	1935	1984	

=== Republican ===
Presidents of the League of Communists of Serbia
No.	Portrait	Name	Took office	Left office	Tenure	Term of office	Birth	PM	Death	Ref.
1		Blagoje Nešković	12 May 1945	21 January 1949	3 years, 254 days	1st (1945–1949)	1907	1935	1984	
2		Petar Stambolić	21 January 1949	29 April 1957	5 years, 98 days	2nd–3rd (1949–1959)	1912	1935	2007	
3		Jovan Veselinov	30 March 1957	4 November 1966	9 years, 219 days	3rd–5th (1959–1968)	1906	1923	1982	
4		Dobrivoje Radosavljević	4 November 1966	19 January 1968	1 year, 76 days	5th (1965–1968)	1915	1933	1984	
2		Petar Stambolić	19 January 1968	23 November 1968	309 days	5th (1965–1968)	1912	1935	2007	
5		Marko Nikezić	23 November 1968	25 October 1972	3 years, 337 days	6th (1968–1974)	1921	1940	1991	
6		Tihomir Vlaškalić	26 October 1972	29 May 1982	9 years, 215 days	6th–8th (1968–1982)	1923	1945	1993	
7		Dušan Čkrebić	29 May 1982	17 May 1984	1 year, 354 days	9th (1982–1986)	1927	1945	2022	
8		Ivan Stambolić	17 May 1984	31 May 1986	2 years, 14 days	9th (1982–1986)	1936	1954	2000	
9		Slobodan Milošević	31 May 1986	24 May 1989	2 years, 358 days	10th (1986–1990)	1941	1959	2006	
10		Bogdan Trifunović	24 May 1989	17 July 1990	1 year, 54 days	10th (1986–1990)	1933	1950	2007	

== Bibliography ==
- Hronologija radničkog pokreta i SKJ 1919–1979: tom — I — 1919–1941 [Chronology of the labor movement and SKJ 1919–1979: Volume — I — 1919–1941] (in Serbo-Croatian). Beograd: Narodna knjiga; Institut za savremenu istoriju. 1980. COBISS 1539739342
- Hronologija radničkog pokreta i SKJ 1919–1979: tom — II — 1941–1945 [Chronology of the labor movement and SKJ 1919–1979: Volume — II — 1941–1945] (in Serbo-Croatian). Beograd: Narodna knjiga; Institut za savremenu istoriju. 1980. COBISS 49272583
- Hronologija radničkog pokreta i SKJ 1919–1979. tom — III — 1945–1979 [Chronology of the labor movement and SKJ 1919–1979: Volume — III — 1945–1979] (in Serbo-Croatian). Beograd: Narodna knjiga; Institut za savremenu istoriju. 1980. COBISS 1539739598
- Lewytzkyj, Borys; Stroynowski, Juliusz, eds. (1978). Who's Who in the Socialist Countries. K. G. Saur Verlag. ISBN 3-7940-3017-6.
- Pirjevec, Jože (2018). Tito and His Comrades. University of Wisconsin Press. ISBN 9780299317706.
- Staff writer, ed. (1953). VI kongres Komunističke partije Jugoslavije: 2-7 novembra 1952: stenografske beleške [VI Congress of the Communist Party of Yugoslavia] (in Serbo-Croatian). Kultura.
- Stroynowski, Juliusz, ed. (1989a). Who's Who in the Socialist Countries of Europe: A–H. K. G. Saur Verlag. ISBN 3-598-10719-6.
- Stroynowski, Juliusz, ed. (1989b). Who's Who in the Socialist Countries of Europe: I–O. K. G. Saur Verlag. ISBN 3-598-10719-6.
- Stroynowski, Juliusz, ed. (1989c). Who's Who in the Socialist Countries of Europe: P–Z. K. G. Saur Verlag. ISBN 3-598-10719-6.
- Tadić, Aleksandar (1968). Pali za lepša svitanja: Majke heroja pričaju [Lights For More Beautiful dawns: Mothers of Heroes Talk] (in Serbo-Croatian). Međunarodna štampa-Interpress.
- Tito, Josip Broz (1980). Cengle, Franc; Strugar, Novak; Borozan, Đorđe (eds.). The Party of the Revolution: Fifth Conference of the Communist Party of Yugoslavia, 1940. Belgrade, SFR Yugoslavia: Socialist Thought and Practice.
- Zalar, Charles, ed. (1961). Yugoslav Communism: A Critical Study. United States Government Printing Office. Archived from the original on 11 June 2023.
