= Stane Dolanc =

Slovenian communist politician (1925–1999)

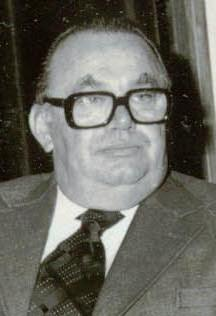
- Stane Dolanc during his visit in Romania, 12 February 1978

10th Secretary of the Interior of SFR Yugoslavia
- In office 15 May 1982 – 15 May 1984
- Prime Minister: Milka Planinc
- Preceded by: Franjo Herljević
- Succeeded by: Dobroslav Ćulafić

18th Vice President of the Presidency of Yugoslavia
- In office 15 May 1988 – 15 May 1989
- President: Raif Dizdarević
- Preceded by: Raif Dizdarević
- Succeeded by: Borisav Jović

Personal details
- Born: 16 November 1925 Hrastnik, Kingdom of Serbs, Croats and Slovenes
- Died: 13 December 1999 (aged 74) Ljubljana, Slovenia
- Party: League of Communists of Yugoslavia (1944–90)

Stane Dolanc (16 November 1925 – 13 December 1999) was a Slovenian communist politician during SFR Yugoslavia. Dolanc was one of president Josip Broz Tito's closest collaborators and one of the most influential people in Yugoslav federal politics in the 1970s and 1980s. He was secretary of the Executive Bureau of the Presidency of the Central Committee (CC) of the League of Communists of Yugoslavia (LCY) from 1971 to 1978, federal Secretary of the Interior from 1982 to 1984 and a member of the Presidency of Yugoslavia from 1984 to 1989. He was regularly appointed a member of the Federal Council for Protection of the Constitutional Order and was chairing the body in late 1980s.

For most of his political career Dolanc defended strong authoritarian rule of the LCY and struggled against nationalism stemming from various parts of the country. He was influential in Yugoslav security structures and it is believed that he inspired a number of politically motivated arrests, especially while he was interior minister.

== Early life ==
Dolanc was born to a worker family in the Slovenian town of Hrastnik, then part of the Kingdom of Serbs, Croats and Slovenes. After finishing elementary school in his home town, he was sent to the Bežigrad High School in Ljubljana. In April 1941, northern Slovenia was occupied by Nazi Germany. Dolanc continued his schooling in Graz in Austria. In 1944, Dolanc joined the Yugoslav Partisans and continued his military career after the war.

He served as a deputy to the prosecutor in Ljubljana Army corps and finished his involvement in the military in 1960 while being a colonel in Zagreb office of the Yugoslav military counter-intelligence service KOS. During his military career Dolanc received a university diploma and in the 1960s he was a director of the Political Science School in Ljubljana run by the Slovene branch of LCY.

== Second person of the League of Communists of Yugoslavia ==
In 1965, Dolanc became a member of the CC of the League of Communists of Slovenia (LCS), and at the ninth congress of LCY in 1969 he was elected a member of the CC LCY. In 1971, he became secretary of the newly established Executive Bureau of the Party Presidium, i.e. second person of LCY, despite the actual number two of Yugoslav politics remained Edvard Kardelj, a lifelong collaborator of president Tito. Dolanc quickly gained strong influence in the Party. He was one of main organizers of the Karađorđevo Party Presidium session in December 1971 that resulted in the resignations of the leaders of the Croatian Spring.

In November 1972, at a CC LCS plenum, he called for purges of the liberal wing of the Slovene Party branch which eventually did take place. He became famous for a statement he had made at a local communist conference in Split in September 1972:

"We have to make clear that in this country we communists are in power. For if we were not, it would mean someone else is. And for now this is not so neither will ever be."

Tito and Dolanc (right) at the Party Presidium session dealing with Croatian Spring, 1971

In the same speech Dolanc stressed that LCY had to be a united organization, announced expulsions of those party members that did not follow the new line and attacked Serb, Croat and Slovene nationalism.

Dolanc's Split speech was directly preceded by a letter signed by himself and Tito addressed to local LCY organizations throughout Yugoslavia. The letter urged strengthening party's unity and leading role in the society, and thus made clear Tito's and his collaborators' decision to go on struggling with liberals and nationalists within LCY that eventually resulted in thorough changes within Croatian, Slovene and Serbian Party leaderships. Although the post of the Executive Bureau secretary was designed to change its holder every year, Dolanc kept it for eight years.

While holding the office, he was often mentioned as a possible successor to Tito. However, during the 1970s in both LCY and federal state institutions a system of rotating collective leadership evolved that made it hardly possible for any single official to become a new leader after Tito. At the eleventh Congress of LCY in 1978 the Executive Bureau was abolished and although Dolanc was appointed secretary of the CC LCY Presidium, he resigned from this office in May 1979. The resignation is sometimes linked to the death of Edvard Kardelj of February in the same year, who reportedly had been protecting Dolanc.

Dolanc remained a member of the CC Presidium and, besides, in June 1979 he was re-appointed a member of the Federal Council for Protection of the Constitutional Order, an agency of the Yugoslav Presidency coordinating internal security institutions. Dolanc continued to play an important role in Yugoslavia's communist political establishment after Tito's death in May 1980.

== Minister of the Interior and member of the Presidency of Yugoslavia ==
In May 1982, Dolanc became the Secretary (Minister) of the Interior in the new Yugoslav government led by Milka Planinc. In May 1983 he complained about the increase of nationalism and of hostile activities against the communist regime and accused dissident intellectuals of being one of the moving forces of it.

In 1984, two politically motivated cases took place that are both directly ascribed to Dolanc. In Belgrade, 28 participants of a lecture of Milovan Đilas were brought to a police interrogation; one of them was found dead few days later while six others faced a trial, which resulted in light punishments or acquittals.

One of the attendees of the lecture Vojislav Šešelj was arrested once again a few weeks later for stating nationalist ideas in an unpublished essay. Dolanc publicly condemned him in a TV interview and Šešelj was eventually sentenced for a several-year imprisonment. Dolanc has been accused of ordering assassinations of political emigrant activists committed by Yugoslav security service abroad and of personal protection of one of its agents, career criminal known as "Arkan". Some have linked him to the assassination of Croatian nationalist emigrant Stjepan Đureković in West Germany in 1983 while others accuse the then-communist leaders of Croatia of ordering the assassination.

From May 1984 to May 1989, Dolanc was the Slovenian member of the Presidency of Yugoslavia and during the term he was also chairman of the Federal Council for Protection of the Constitutional Order. In the 1988-89 period, he was one of those in the federal leadership unsuccessfully opposing the anti-bureaucratic revolution, which he regarded as an expression of Serb hegemonism. At the same time Dolanc was reserved towards the new line of the Slovene communist leadership that was paving the way for political liberalization and for separation of Slovenia.

One of his last public interventions was an interview with the liberal opposition magazine Mladina, published in May 1989, in which he described himself as the "last Titoist". In her memoir, Jovanka Broz stated she considered Dolanc to be "one of those who are most to blame for the breakup of the country" and accused him of being a German spy.

== Late life ==
After his term in the Federal Presidency expired, Dolanc retreated from public life and moved to Gozd–Martuljek close to Kranjska Gora. He died in Ljubljana on 12 December 1999, from a cerebral stroke. He was 74 years old.

== Sources ==
- Bojan Balkovec et al., Slovenska kronika XX. stoletja (Ljubljana: Nova revija, 1997)
- Miran Lesjak & Bernard Nežmah, "Poslednji titoist" (interview with Stane Dolanc) in Mladina, n. 18 (19 May 1989)
- Božo Repe, Rdeča Slovenija: tokovi in obrazi iz obdobja socializma (Ljubljana: Sophia, 2003)
- Bernard Nežmah, "Stane Dolanc (1926–1999): najtrša pest slovenskih komunistov" in Mladina, n. 51 (20 December 1999)
- Božo Repe, "Vojak partije, veliki gobar iz Martuljka, naš čovik: smrt Staneta Dolanca" in Delo, y. 41, n. 294 (18 December 1999)

Political offices
Preceded by Franjo Herljević	Secretary of the Interior of Yugoslavia; 1982–1984	Succeeded by Dobroslav Ćulafić
Preceded by Raif Dizdarević	Vice-President of the Presidency of SFR Yugoslavia; 1988–1989	Succeeded by Borisav Jović
