= President of the League of Communists of Slovenia =

Leader of the League of Communists of Slovenia

General Secretary of Central Committee of the League of Communists of Slovenia
- Slovene: Generalni sekretar Centralnega komiteja Zveze komunistov Slovenije
- Emblems of the LCY

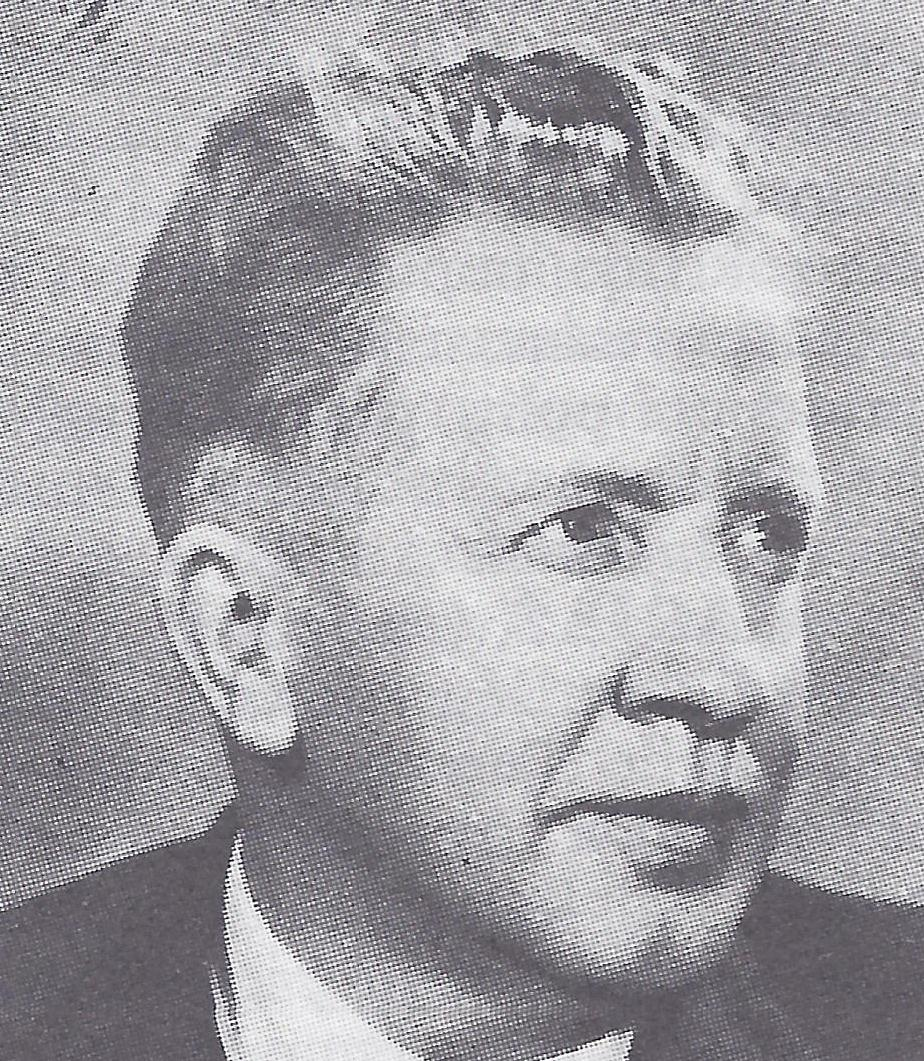
- Longest serving Miha Marinko; June 1946 – 17 October 1966
- Type: Party leader
- Member of: LCY Presidency and SRS Presidency
- Appointer: ZKS Central Committee
- Term length: Four years, non-renewable (1982–1991)
- Constituting instrument: LCY Charter & ZKS Charter
- Formation: 18 April 1937
- First holder: Franc Leskošek
- Final holder: Ciril Ribičič
- Abolished: 27 October 1990

The General secretary was the leader of the League of Communists of Slovenia (ZKS), the ruling party of the Socialist Republic of Slovenia (SRS) in the Socialist Federal Republic of Yugoslavia. Party rules stipulated that the ZKS Central Committee elected the president. Moreover, the Central Committee was empowered to remove the president. The president served ex officio as a member of the Presidency of the Central Committee of the League of Communists of Yugoslavia (LCY) and of the SRS Presidency. To be eligible to serve, the president had to be a member of the Presidency of the ZKS Central Committee. The 8th ZKS Congress instituted a two-year term limits for officeholders.

The office traces its lineage back to the office of "Secretary of the Provincial Committee of the Communist Party of Yugoslavia in Slovenia", established after the founding of the LCY in 1919. This body had no distinct rights and was under the jurisdiction of the Yugoslav Central Committee. On 17 April 1937, the LCY convened the founding congress of the Communist Party of Slovenia. On 18 April, the Central Committee of the 1st Congress elected Franc Leskošek as "Secretary of the Central Committee of the Communist Party of Slovenia". The LCY 6th Congress on 2–7 November 1952, renamed the party League of Communists, and the Slovene republican branch followed suit and changed its name to League of Communists of Slovenia. On 4 October 1966, the 5th Plenary Session of the Central Committee of the LCY 8th Congress abolished the office of General Secretary at the national level and replaced with the office of President. The ZKS Central Committee convened a meeting on 17 October 1966 that abolished the office of secretary and established the "President of the Central Committee of the League of Communists of Slovenia". The reforms passed by the LCY Central Committee plenum strengthened the powers of the republican branches and gave more powers to the Slovene party leader. The 9th ZKS Congress introduced another set of reforms on 30 July 1982, which abolished the existing office and replaced it with the "President of the Presidency of the Central Committee of the League of Communists of Slovenia". This office was retained until 27 October 1990, after the party dropped "League of Communists of Slovenia" from its name on 17 July 1990 and became known solely as the "Party of Democratic Reform."

== Office history ==
Title	Established	Abolished	Established by
Secretary of the Provincial Committee of the Communist Party of Yugoslavia for Slovenia; Slovene: Sekretar Pokrajinskega komiteja Komunistične partije Jugoslavije za Slovenijo	23 April 1919	18 April 1937	1st Congress of the Socialist Labour Party of Yugoslavia (Communists)
Secretary of the Central Committee of the League of Communists of Slovenia; Sekretar Centralnega komiteja Zveze komunistov Slovenije	18 April 1937	17 October 1966	1st Congress of the Communist Party of Slovenia
President of the Central Committee of the League of Communists of Slovenia; Predsednik Centralnega komiteja Zveze komunistov Slovenije	17 October 1966	30 July 1982	? Plenary Session of the Central Committee of the 5th Congress
President of the Presidency of the Central Committee of the League of Communists of Slovenia; Predsednik predsedstva Centralnega komiteja Zveze komunistov Slovenije	30 July 1982	27 October 1990	9th Congress of the League of Communists of Slovenia

== Officeholders ==
Presidents of the League of Communists of Slovenia
No.	Portrait	Name	Took office	Left office	Tenure	Term of office	Birth	PM	Death	Ref.
1		Franc Leskošek	18 April 1937	December 1945	8 years, 227 days	1st (1937–1948)	1897	1926	1983	
2		Boris Kidrič	December 1945	June 1946	182 days	1st (1937–1948)	1912	1928	1953	
3		Miha Marinko	June 1946	17 October 1966	20 years, 138 days	1st–5th (1937–1968)	1900	1923	1983	
4		Albert Jakopič	17 October 1966	11 December 1968	2 years, 55 days	5th (1965–1968)	1914	1942	1996	
5		France Popit	11 December 1968	30 July 1982	13 years, 128 days	5th–8th (1968–1982)	1921	1940	2013	
6		Andrej Marinc	30 July 1982	19 April 1986	3 years, 263 days	9th (1982–1986)	1930	1947	2025	
7		Milan Kučan	19 April 1986	23 December 1989	3 years, 248 days	10th (1986–1989)	1941	1958	Alive	
8		Ciril Ribičič	23 December 1989	27 October 1990	308 days	11th (1989–1990)	1947	?	Alive	

== Bibliography ==
- Lewytzkyj, Borys; Stroynowski, Juliusz, eds. (1978). Who's Who in the Socialist Countries. K. G. Saur Verlag. ISBN 3-7940-3017-6.
- Plut-Pregelj, Leopoldina; Kranjc, Gregor; Lazarević, Žarko; Rogel, Carole (2018). Historical Dictionary of Slovenia. Rowman & Littlefield Publishers. ISBN 9781538111062.
- Staff writer (1986). Directory of Yugoslav officials: A Reference Aid. Reference aid. University of Michigan.
- Stanković, Slobodan (1981). The End of the Tito Era: Yugoslavia's Dilemmas. Hoover International Studies. ISBN 9780817973629.
- Stroynowski, Juliusz, ed. (1989a). Who's Who in the Socialist Countries of Europe: A–H. K. G. Saur Verlag. ISBN 3-598-10719-6.
- Stroynowski, Juliusz, ed. (1989b). Who's Who in the Socialist Countries of Europe: I–O. K. G. Saur Verlag. ISBN 3-598-10719-6.
- Stroynowski, Juliusz, ed. (1989c). Who's Who in the Socialist Countries of Europe: P–Z. K. G. Saur Verlag. ISBN 3-598-10719-6.
