= League of Communists of Montenegro =

Montenegrin political party

League of Communists of Montenegro Serbo-Croatian: Savez komunista Crne Gore
- Leader: President of the League of Communists of Montenegro
- Founded: 7 October 1948
- Dissolved: 22 June 1991
- Succeeded by: Democratic Party of Socialists of Montenegro
- Headquarters: Titograd, SR Montenegro, SFR Yugoslavia
- Ideology: Communism; Marxism–Leninism; Titoism
- Political position: Left-wing to far-left
- National affiliation: League of Communists of Yugoslavia
- Parliamentary control in 1946: 125 / 125
- Parliamentary control in 1990: 83 / 125

Party flag
- Politics of Montenegro; Political parties; Elections; Montenegrin branch of the League of Communists of Yugoslavia

The League of Communists of Montenegro (Serbo-Croatian: Savez komunista Crne Gore, SKCG) was the Montenegrin branch of the League of Communists of Yugoslavia, the sole legal party of Yugoslavia from 1945 to 1990. Under a 1974 SFR Yugoslavia constitution, greater powers were devolved to the various republic level branches.

== History ==
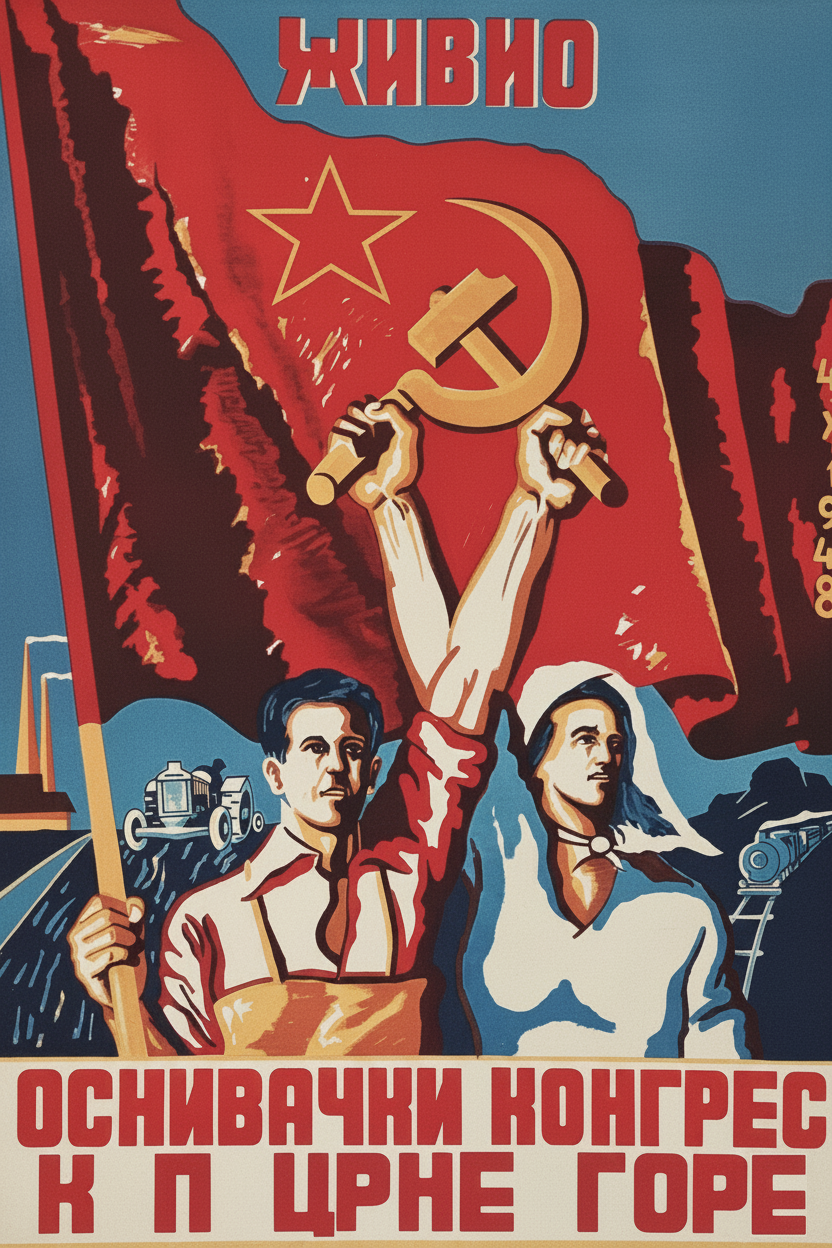
Poster commemorating the founding congress of Communist party of Montenegro, 1948

The league was originally known as the Communist Party of Montenegro (Serbo-Croatian: Komunistička partija Crne Gore, KPCG). In 1952, the Communist Party of Montenegro was renamed the League of Communists of Montenegro in line with the party's name change on the Yugoslav federal level.

=== Dissolution ===
During the early 1990s, the collapse of communism and growing ethnic tensions between the Yugoslav republics led to the federal party's breakup.

On June 22, 1991, the League's Montenegrin branch formally dissolved and its direct successor became the newly created Democratic Party of Socialists (DPS). In essence, the new party continued right where the old one left off, as its entire membership stayed the same.

== Party leaders ==
1. Blažo Jovanović (7 October 1948 – 29 June 1963) (1907–1976)
2. Đorđije Pajković (29 June 1963 – 14 December 1968) (1917–1980)
3. Veselin Đuranović (14 December 1968 – 21 March 1977) (1925–1997)
4. Vojislav Srzentić (21 March 1977 – 1 July 1982) (born 1934)
5. Dobroslav Ćulafić (1 July 1982 – May 1984) (1926–2011)
6. Vidoje Žarković (May 1984 – 30 July 1984) (1927–2000)
7. Marko Orlandić (30 July 1984 – May 1986) (1930–2019)
8. Miljan Radović (May 1986 – 11 January 1989) (1933–2015)
9. Veselin Vukotić (acting; 11 January 1989 – 26 April 1989) (born 1949)
10. Milica Pejanović-Đurišić (26 April 1989 – 28 April 1989) (born 1959)
11. Momir Bulatović (28 April 1989 – 4 February 1990) (1956–2019)

== New party ==
A new League of Communists of Montenegro was founded in 1993. Later that group united with other communist groups to form the League of Communists of Yugoslavia - Communists of Montenegro which got 2,343 (0.69%) votes in 2006 elections and 1,595 (0.49%) votes in 2009 elections. In 2009, this party merged with the 'Yugoslav Communists of Montenegro to form the Yugoslav Communist Party of Montenegro, a non-parliamentary party which managed to obtain 1 seat in the Plužine Municipal Assembly.

== See also ==
- History of Montenegro
- League of Communists of Yugoslavia
  - League of Communists of Bosnia and Herzegovina
  - League of Communists of Croatia
  - League of Communists of Macedonia
  - League of Communists of Serbia
    - League of Communists of Vojvodina
    - League of Communists of Kosovo
  - League of Communists of Slovenia
- List of leaders of communist Yugoslavia
- Socialist Federal Republic of Yugoslavia
