= Dobroslav Ćulafić =

Yugoslav politician

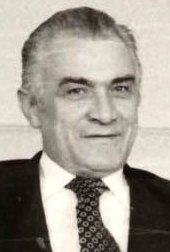

11th Secretary of the Interior of SFR Yugoslavia
- In office 15 May 1984 – 16 May 1989
- Prime Minister: Milka Planinc; Branko Mikulić
- Preceded by: Stane Dolanc
- Succeeded by: Petar Gračanin

5th President of the League of Communists of Montenegro
- In office 1 July 1982 – May 1984
- Preceded by: Vojislav Srzentić
- Succeeded by: Vidoje Žarković

Personal details
- Born: 17 January 1926 Andrijevica, Kingdom of Serbs, Croats, and Slovenes
- Died: 3 June 2011 (aged 85) Podgorica, Montenegro
- Party: League of Communists of Yugoslavia

Dobroslav "Toro" Ćulafić (17 January 1926 – 3 June 2011) was a Yugoslav politician from Montenegro who served as Secretary of the Interior of SFR Yugoslavia from 1984 to 1989.

Educated in Belgrade and later a partisan fighter in World War II, Ćulafić became an active member of the League of Communists of Yugoslavia after he joined in 1943. He served in a number of government positions before the collapse of Yugoslavia in the early 1990s.

== See also ==
- League of Communists of Montenegro
- Ministry of the Interior (Yugoslavia)
