= Staff writer =

Byline denoting an author employed by the publisher

A staff writer is a person, often an intern, whom a publication such as a magazine employs to propose ideas for articles, write them and sometimes do clerical and research work.

== Works cited ==
- Rivers, William L.; Smolkin, Shelley (1981). Free-lancer and staff writer--newspaper features and magazine articles (3 ed.). Belmont, Calif: Wadsworth Pub. Co. ISBN 978-0-534-00873-4.
