= K. G. Saur Verlag =

German publisher

- Parent company: Walter de Gruyter
- Founder: Karl-Otto Saur
- Country of origin: Germany
- Headquarters location: Munich
- Publication types: books
- Nonfiction topics: library reference
- Official website: www.degruyter.com

K. G. Saur Verlag is a German publisher based in Munich that specializes in reference information for libraries. The publishing house, founded in 1949 by Karl-Otto Saur, Chief of Armament Staff of wartime Nazi Germany as Dokumentation Saur, only became economically successful, now named K. G. Saur Verlag, from 1966 under his son Klaus Gerhard Saur.

In 1987, K. G. Saur was acquired by Reed International. Its British holdings were merged into the separate company Bowker-Saur. In 2000, Reed Elsevier sold K. G. Saur to the Gale Group, a unit of the Thomson Corporation. Walter de Gruyter acquired it in 2006.

== Publications ==
Among the publications are the German Biographical Encyclopedia (DBE), the Bibliotheca Teubneriana, and the World Biographical Information System, which contains biographical information on almost five million people, from the 4th millennium BC to the present day. In 1981, the comprehensive catalog of German-language publications, a retrospective national bibliography for the German-speaking world, was completed. The library science series and works are continued under the De Gruyter Saur imprint .
