= President of the League of Communists of Macedonia =

Leader of the League of Communists of Macedonia

- Macedonian: Претседател на Сојузот на комунистите на Македонија
- Emblems of the LCY

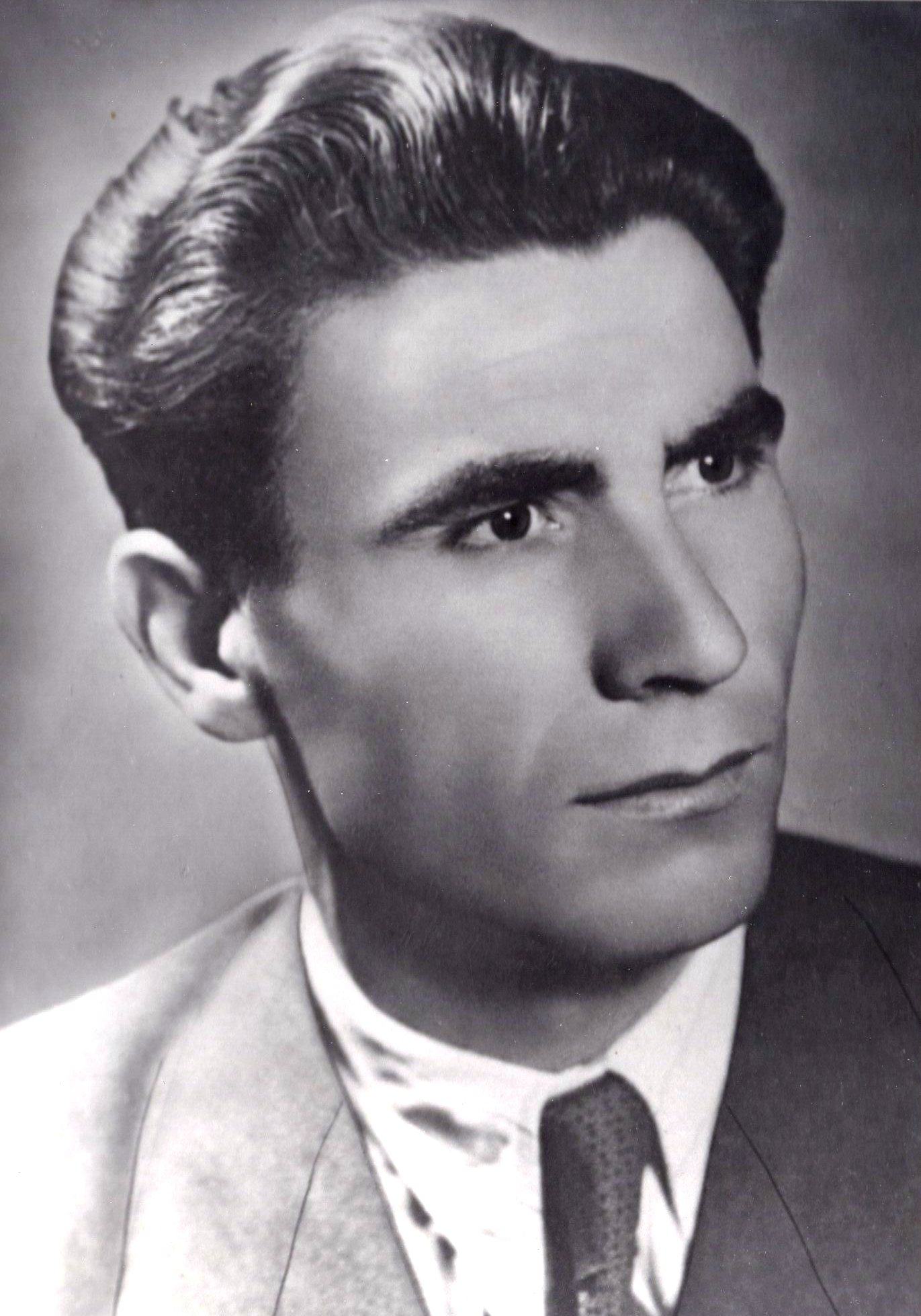
- Longest serving Lazar Koliševski; 19 March 1943 – 3 July 1963
- Type: Party leader
- Member of: LCY Presidency and SRM Presidency
- Appointer: SKM Central Committee
- Term length: Two years, non-renewable (1982–1991)
- Constituting instrument: LCY Charter & SKM Charter
- Formation: 19 March 1943
- First holder: Lazar Koliševski
- Final holder: Petar Gošev
- Abolished: 20 April 1991

The president was the leader of the League of Communists of Macedonia (SKM), the ruling party of the Socialist Republic of Macedonia (SRM) in the Socialist Federal Republic of Yugoslavia. Party rules stipulated that the SKM Central Committee elected the president. Moreover, the Central Committee was empowered to remove the president. The president served ex officio as a member of the Presidency of the Central Committee of the League of Communists of Yugoslavia (LCY) and of the SRM Presidency. To be eligible to serve, the president had to be a member of the Presidency of the SKM Central Committee. The 8th SKM Congress instituted a two-year term limits for officeholders.

The office traces its lineage back to the office of "Secretary of the Regional Committee of the Communist Party of Yugoslavia in Macedonia", established on 8 September 1939. This body had no distinct rights and was under the jurisdiction of the Yugoslav Central Committee. On 19 March 1943, the Regional Committee transformed itself into the Communist Party of Macedonia and elected Lazar Koliševski as "Secretary of the Central Committee of the League of Communists of Macedonia". The LCY 6th Congress on 2–7 November 1952, renamed the party League of Communists, and the Macedonian republican branch followed suit and changed its name to League of Communists of Macedonia. On 4 October 1966, the 5th Plenary Session of the Central Committee of the LCY 8th Congress abolished the office of General Secretary at the national level and replaced with the office of President. The SKM Central Committee convened a meeting in 1966 that abolished the office of secretary and established the "President of the Central Committee of the League of Communists of Macedonia". The reforms passed by the LCY Central Committee plenum strengthened the powers of the republican branches and gave more powers to the Macedonian party leader. The 8th SKM Congress introduced another set of reforms on 8 May 1982, which abolished the existing office and replaced it with the "President of the Presidency of the Central Committee of the League of Communists of Macedonia". This office was retained until 20 April 1991, when the party changed its name to the "Social Democratic Union of Macedonia" on 20 April 1991.

== Office history ==
Title	Established	Abolished	Established by
Secretary of the Regional Committee of the Communist Party of Yugoslavia in Macedonia; Macedonian: Секретар на Регионалниот комитет на КПЈ во Македонија	8 September 1939	19 March 1943	Central Committee of the 4th Congress of the Communist Party of Yugoslavia
Secretary of the Central Committee of the League of Communists of Macedonia; Macedonian: Секретар на ЦК на Сојузот на комунистите на Македонија	19 March 1943	12 November 1966	1st Congress of the Communist Party of Macedonia
President of the Central Committee of the League of Communists of Macedonia; Macedonian: Претседател на Централниот комитет на Сојузот на комунистите на Македонија	12 November 1966	8 May 1982	? Plenary Session of the Central Committee of the 4th Congress
President of the Presidency of the Central Committee of the League of Communists of Macedonia; Macedonian: Претседател на Претседателството на Централниот комитет на Сојузот на комунистите на Македонија	8 May 1982	20 April 1991	8th Congress of the League of Communists of Macedonia

== Officeholders ==
=== Predecessor ===
Secretaries of the Regional Committee of Communists in Macedonia
No.	Portrait	Name	Took office	Left office	Tenure	Birth	PM	Death	Ref.
1		Blažo Orlandić	8 September 1939	March 1940	175 days	1914	1933	1943	
2		Metodi Shatorov	March 1940	August 1941	1 year, 153 days	1897	1940	1944	
3		Lazar Koliševski	August 1941	November 1941	92 days	1914	1935	2000	
4		Bane Andreev	November 1941	May 1942	181 days	1905	1923	1980	
5		Cvetko Uzunovski	June 1942	September 1942	2 years, 92 days	1912	1937	1994	
6		Kuzman Josifovski Pitu	September 1942	19 March 1943	199 days	1915	1938	1944	

=== Presidents ===
Presidents of the League of Communists of Macedonia
No.	Portrait	Name	Took office	Left office	Tenure	Term of office	Birth	PM	Death	Ref.
1		Lazar Koliševski	19 March 1943	3 July 1963	20 years, 106 days	1st–3rd (1948–1965)	1914	1935	2000	
2		Krste Crvenkovski	3 July 1963	20 March 1969	5 years, 260 days	3rd–5th (1959–1974)	1921	1939	2001	
3		Angel Čemerski	20 March 1969	8 May 1982	13 years, 49 days	5th–7th (1968–1982)	1923	1942	2003	
4		Krste Markovski	8 May 1982	5 May 1984	1 year, 363 days	8th (1982–1986)	1925	1941	Alive	
5		Milan Pančevski	5 May 1984	10 May 1986	2 years, 5 days	8th (1982–1986)	1935	1957	2019	
6		Jakov Lazaroski	10 May 1986	28 November 1989	3 years, 202 days	9th (1986–1989)	1936	1958	2021	
7		Petar Gošev	28 November 1989	20 April 1991	1 year, 143 days	10th (1989–1991)	1948	1971	Alive	

== Bibliography ==
- Bechev, Dimitar (2019). Historical Dictionary of North Macedonia. Rowman & Littlefield Publishers. ISBN 9781538119617.
- Burić, Radomir (1981). Govor ratnih fotografija [The Speech of War Photographs] (in Serbo-Croatian). Književne novine.
- Lewytzkyj, Borys; Stroynowski, Juliusz, eds. (1978). Who's Who in the Socialist Countries. K. G. Saur Verlag. ISBN 3-7940-3017-6.
- Stroynowski, Juliusz, ed. (1989a). Who's Who in the Socialist Countries of Europe: A–H. K. G. Saur Verlag. ISBN 3-598-10719-6.
- Stroynowski, Juliusz, ed. (1989b). Who's Who in the Socialist Countries of Europe: I–O. K. G. Saur Verlag. ISBN 3-598-10719-6.
- Stroynowski, Juliusz, ed. (1989c). Who's Who in the Socialist Countries of Europe: P–Z. K. G. Saur Verlag. ISBN 3-598-10719-6.
- Tadić, Aleksandar (1968). Pali za lepša svitanja: Majke heroja pričaju [Lights For More Beautiful dawns: Mothers of Heroes Talk] (in Serbo-Croatian). Međunarodna štampa-Interpress.
- Tito, Josip Broz (1982a). Damjanović, Pero; Vujošević, Ubavka (eds.). Sabrana djela [Selected Works] (in Serbo-Croatian). Vol. 7. Komunist.
- Tito, Josip Broz (1982b). Damjanović, Pero; Vujošević, Ubavka (eds.). Sabrana djela [Selected Works] (in Serbo-Croatian). Vol. 13. Komunist.
- Tito, Josip Broz (1984). Damjanović, Pero; Vujošević, Ubavka (eds.). Sabrana djela [Selected Works] (in Serbo-Croatian). Vol. 17. Komunist.
- Vukotić, Jovo (1972). Druga proleterska divizija [The Second Proletarian Division] (in Serbo-Croatian). Vojnoizdavčki zavod.
