= Bane Andreev =

Politician (1905–1980)

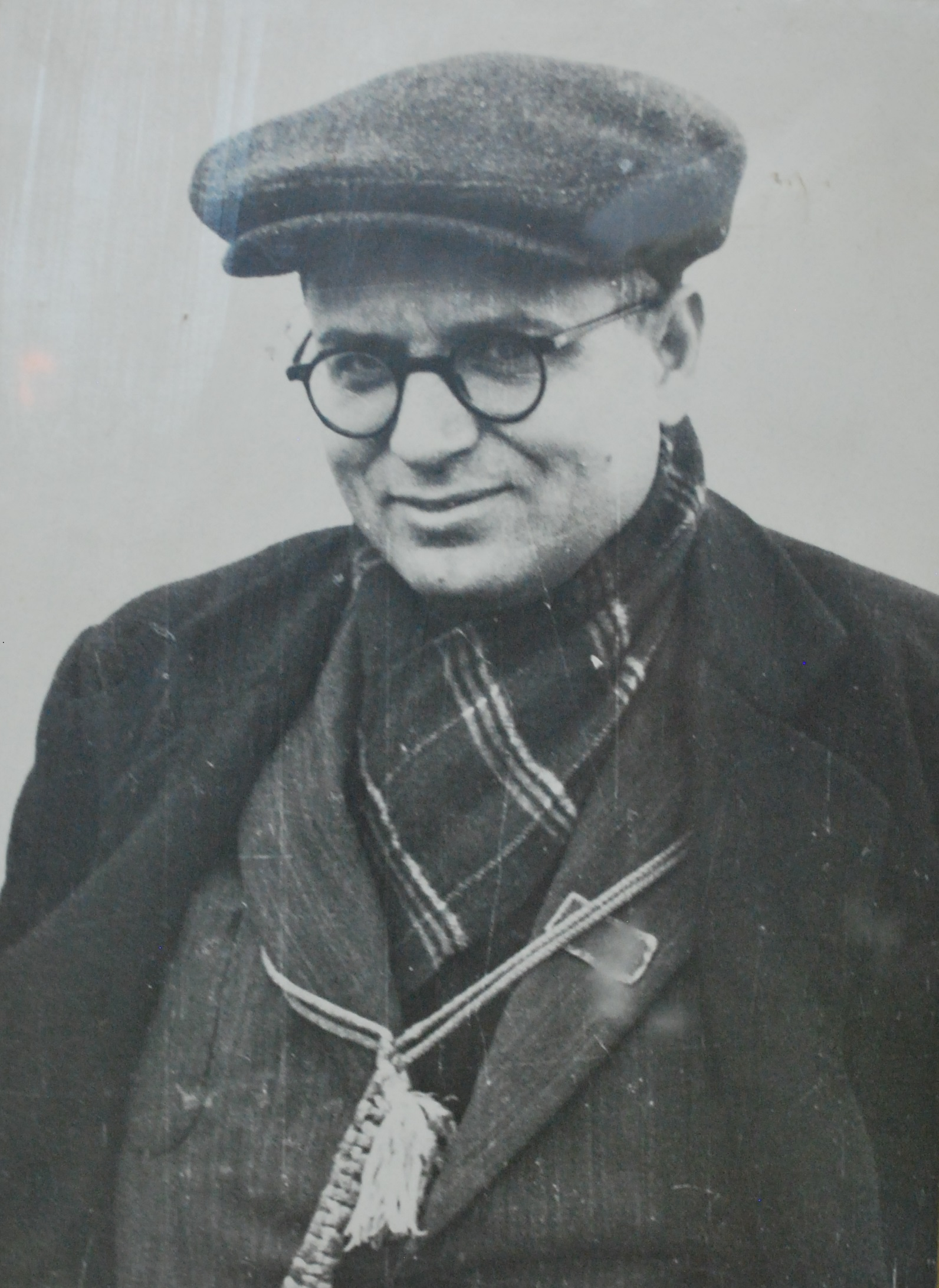
Bane Andreev

Bane Andreеv (Macedonian: Бане Андреев; 12 August 1905 – 31 October 1980), also known under the pseudonym Ronkata, was a communist official and politician in Yugoslav Macedonia. He was a leader of the Regional Committee of Communists in Macedonia during World War II. After the Tito–Stalin split in 1948, he was removed from all of his positions as a Cominformist.

== Life ==
Bane Andreev was born in Veles on 12 August 1905. He became a member of the League of Socialist Youth of Yugoslavia (SKOJ) in 1922 and the Communist Party of Yugoslavia (KPJ) in 1923. In 1924, he became a member of the Veles committee of SKOJ. Andreev participated as a delegate in the provincial conferences of SKOJ for Macedonia and the Third Congress of SKOJ in 1926. As a student at the University of Belgrade, he also became a member of the provincial committee of SKOJ for Serbia and the Central Committee (CC) of SKOJ in the late 1920s. He was arrested in January 1929 and sentenced to prison. According to historian Ivo Banac, he served at least five years in prisons in Sremska Mitrovica and Lepoglava, while per other sources, he served fifteen years. In prison, he had maintained friendly relations with Croatian nationalists and at one point, he was committed to solitary confinement for one month for attempting to smuggle food to Juco Rukavina, an imprisoned Ustaše leader.

Per Banac, Andreev's rise to power in the KPJ began in 1935, when he became secretary of the KPJ's Skopje district committee. In 1939, the poet Kočo Racin dedicated a poem to him in his collection White Dawns. He later became a member of the Regional Committee of Communists in Macedonia and in 1941 went along with the committee's secretary Metodi Shatorov's decision to place the committee under the authority of the Bulgarian Communist Party (BCP). During the war, he held pro-Bulgarian views. A dispute ensued between KPJ and BCP. After the Communist International confirmed KPJ's authority in Macedonia, Andreev was included in the new regional committee (consisting of Vera Aceva, Mara Naceva and others), which Dragan Pavlović, Tito's field representative, entrusted to Koliševski in mid-September 1941 and it was bound to follow the Titoist agenda. Shatorov was expelled from KPJ and went to Bulgaria. BCP wanted to limit the influence of the committee and sent two of its representatives to Skopje, Petar Bogdanov and Boyan Balgaranov. Despite his association with Shatorov, Andreev was regarded as conciliatory toward the KPJ, perhaps because of his time served in prison. With Koliševski's arrest on 7 November 1941 and subsequent imprisonment, Andreev became the committee's secretary, serving in that role until May 1942. Under his leadership, the committee re-established contact with the BCP. Andreev cooperated with Balgaranov and took orders from BCP. He resisted the KPJ's strategy of destabilizing Bulgaria's control of Macedonia through partisan resistance, which the BCP found inappropriate. Andreev avoided all references to Yugoslavia in the committee's documents, signing declarations in the name of "a group of Macedonians," "honest Macedonians," etc. As a result, he was subject to pressure by KPJ's CC and pro-Tito Macedonian leaders. Members of the committee, Borko Talevski and Vera Aceva, denounced Andreev to KPJ's CC, claiming that Andreev stated that the partisan resistance in Macedonia could not proceed while the people still had illusions about the Bulgarian authorities as liberators. Aceva also accused Andreev of being under the influence of Bulgarophile IMRO nationalists. Mirče Acev, Aceva's brother and another member of the committee, criticized Andreev's reluctance to mention Yugoslavia in documents. Ljupčo Arsov, a veteran of the Zagreb student movement, condemned Andreev's "divisive stand toward the KPJ CC."

Former IMRO activists Yordan Chkatrov and Kosta Tsipushev protected him from harassment by Bulgarian authorities. The new leadership of the committee did not include him as a member. However, most Macedonian communists were not oriented towards Yugoslavia then. In February 1943, Josip Broz Tito sent Svetozar Vukmanović-Tempo to Macedonia to bring the committee under KPJ's control. A new Communist Party of Macedonia (KPM) was established within the framework of KPJ. On 28 March 1943, he became a member of KPM's CC. After his arrest in Bitola in the same year he was interned in the village of Shiyakovo in northern Bulgaria from July to November 1943. Andreev became a member of the Anti-Fascist Council for the National Liberation of Yugoslavia (AVNOJ). Although he was listed as a participant in the second session of AVNOJ in November 1943, he did not participate like any person from Macedonia. He served as a political commissar of the General Staff of the Macedonian Partisans from June to October 1944. Andreev was a delegate in the first session of Anti-fascist Assembly for the National Liberation of Macedonia (ASNOM) on 2 August 1944. In his speech in the first session of ASNOM, Andreev stated that Yugoslav Macedonia would have the role of unifying the entire Macedonian region. In another statement, he mentioned the right of the "Macedonian people" to "self-determination, secession and unification with other peoples." He was a member of the assembly and served as minister of mining in the government of the Federal People's Republic of Yugoslavia. Andreev received the Commemorative Medal of the Partisans of 1941.

He wrote in the journal Macedonian thought of the Macedonian Scientific Institute in the 1940s about "vampired great-Bulgarian chauvinists." Andreev claimed that the Macedonian Slavs in the Middle Ages were not Bulgarians, writing: "Macedonian Sclavinias under the leadership of Samuel managed to free themselves from the Byzantine yoke and to unite in the Macedonian state (from 976–1018)." At KPJ's Fifth Congress in 1948, he was not selected in KPJ's CC, while all the six Macedonians who were selected were pro-Tito. In the 1940s, he was described as "the oldest living Communist in Macedonia who retained his party position until the Fifth Congress." Andreev only had the status of a CC candidate along with four other Macedonians, all of whom had joined the KPJ only in 1940. At the First Congress of KPM in late December 1948, Andreev was elected to the CC, but not to the Politburo. During the Informbiro period then, rumors of his implicit Cominformism soon followed. He denied them in the newspaper Borba on 16 June 1949. Despite the denial, he soon developed contacts with the Cominformists. He was expelled from KPJ in December 1949. Andreev was also removed from all party and government positions, and started living in obscurity. He also fell out with Tito partly because of his friendship with the Croatian communist Andrija Hebrang, who was also purged. Andreev was permitted to work in the Socialist Republic of Serbia until his retirement in 1965. He died in Belgrade on 31 October 1980, but was buried in Skopje.
