= Metodi =

Metodi may refer to:

- 2609 Kiril-Metodi, main belt asteroid with an orbital period of 1209
- Metodi Deyanov (born 1975), former midfielder
- Metodi Shatorov (1897–1944), Bulgarian politician and leader of the Macedonian communists
