= Macedonian NLA =

Macedonian NLA may refer to:

- Macedonian Partisans, officially the National Liberation Army and Partisan Detachments of Macedonia, active in World War II
- National Liberation Army (Macedonia), a guerrilla organization operating in 2001
