= Macedonian Partisans =

Anti-fascist movement in occupied Yugoslavia

National Liberation Army and Partisan Detachments of Macedonia
- The flag of the Macedonian Partisans
- Active: 1941 (1943) – 1945
- Allegiance: Communist Party of Macedonia
- Size: 1,000 (1941); 8,000 (August 1944); 66,000 (late 1944) up to 100,000 (April 1945)
- Part of: (Democratic Federal Yugoslavia) Yugoslav Partisans
- Anniversaries: August 18; October 11
- Engagements: World War II in Yugoslav Macedonia (part of World War II in Yugoslavia)

Commanders
- Notable commanders: Mirče Acev †; Mihajlo Apostolski; Metodija Andonov-Čento; Svetozar Vukmanović-Tempo

The Macedonian Partisans, (Note: Macedonian: македонски партизани, romanized: makedonski partizani) officially the National Liberation Army and Partisan Detachments of Macedonia, (Note: Macedonian: Народноослободителна војска и партизански одреди на Македонија, НОВ и ПОМ, romanized: Narodnoosloboditelna vojska i partizanski odredi na Makedonija, NOV i POM Serbo-Croatian: Narodnooslobodilačka vojska i partizanski odredi Makedonije) was a communist and anti-fascist resistance movement formed in occupied Yugoslavia which was active in the World War II in Yugoslav Macedonia (National Liberation Struggle). Units of the army were formed by Macedonians within the framework of the Yugoslav Partisans as well as other communist resistance organisations operating in Macedonia at the time and were led by the General Staff of the National Liberation Army and Partisan Detachments of Macedonia, headed by Mihajlo Apostolski. During the war, 24 infantry brigades, six artillery brigades, four engineering brigades, one automobile brigade and one cavalry brigade were formed in the Macedonian army. From these brigades, seven divisions were formed, and later the 8th KNOJ division, as well as 3 corps.

== History ==
=== Resistance under question ===
After the Bulgarian takeover of Vardar Banovina in April 1941, the Macedonian communists fell in the sphere of influence of the Bulgarian Communist Party (BCP), which supported the idea of an independent and unified Macedonia. They thought that the ordinary Macedonian people believe in Bulgaria's role as liberator from the oppressive Serbian rule and that no Macedonian wants to fight against the Bulgarian soldiers. Also, they believed that Macedonian people preferred a unified independent Macedonia rather than becoming part of Yugoslavia again as the Communist Party of Yugoslavia (CPY) had in mind. Nevertheless, when the USSR was attacked by Nazi Germany in June, some form of anti-Axis resistance started, with the emergence of Macedonian Partisan military units. Fighters from the Prilep Partisan Detachment "Goce Delchev" attacked the Bulgarian police station in the city of Prilep on 11 October 1941, thus this date is considered to be the beginning of the Macedonian Uprising against fascism. Initially it had no real success. The problem arose at the end of 1941, when the CPY lost its contact with the local communists due to its leaders withdrawal into Bosnia and because the Bulgarian forces captured Lazar Koliševski, whom the CPY had appointed to led the Macedonian communists. The role of the Bulgarian communists, which avoided organizing mass armed resistance in the area, was also a key factor. As well as the fear of reestablishment of the previous despised Yugoslav (Serbian) rule and the unfavorable stance of the CPY towards the idea of unification of Macedonia.

=== Resistance in development ===
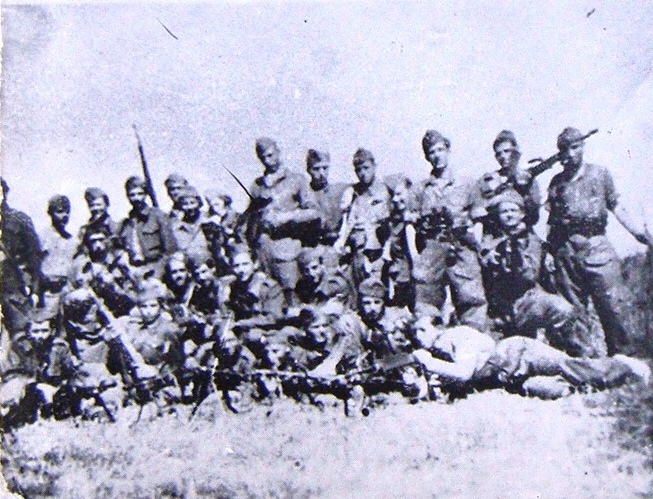
Partisans of Stiv Naumov Battalion, set up in November 1943 in Gorna Prespa.

The wartime backlash from the Bulgarian national chauvinism and suffering generated sizable support for the partisans. Although several revolts arose in 1942 which led to temporary liberation of some areas, most Macedonian communists were not yet lured to Yugoslavia. Between 1941 and 1943, Tito sent five emissaries to Macedonia, to persuade his ill-disciplined comrades, but their efforts had limited success, and the Regional Committee of the Communists in Macedonia was de facto under the control of the Bulgarian Communist Party. To change that, in the beginning of 1943 the Montenegrin Svetozar Vukmanović-Tempo was sent by Tito as an assistant to the HQ of the Macedonian partisan forces. One of his objectives was to destroy the influence of the BCP in Macedonia and to set up a Macedonian Communist Party within the framework of the Yugoslav one, which would include only activists loyal to the Yugoslav agenda. Tempo was able to capitalize on the increasing resentment towards the Bulgarian regime as result of the oppressive Bulgarianisation and centralisation policy. Yugoslav communists proclaimed as their aim the issue of unification of the three regions of Macedonia – Yugoslav, Greek and Bulgarian, within Yugoslavia as extension of its prewar territory and so managed to attract Macedonian nationalists. As result the Communist Party of Macedonia (CPM) was formed on 19 March 1943 in Tetovo, then in the Italian occupation zone. In May 1943 Mihajlo Apostolski was promoted to Major General and during the Second Session of AVNOJ he became a member of the Presidency of AVNOJ. Apostolski became the commander of the General Staff of the National Liberation Army and Partisan Detachments of Macedonia.

=== People's Liberation Army of Macedonia ===
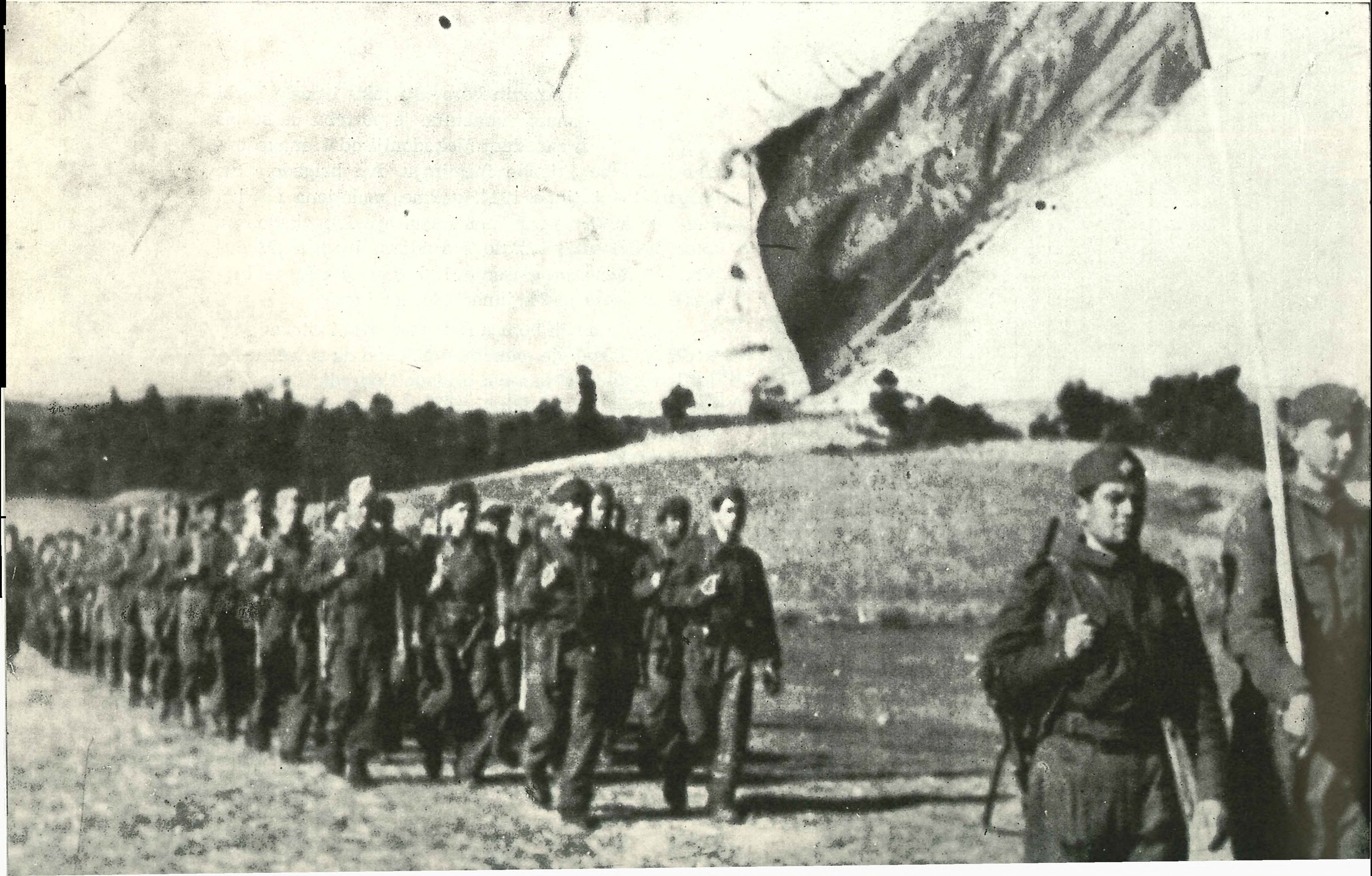
Partisans of the 4th Macedonian Brigade in August 1944.

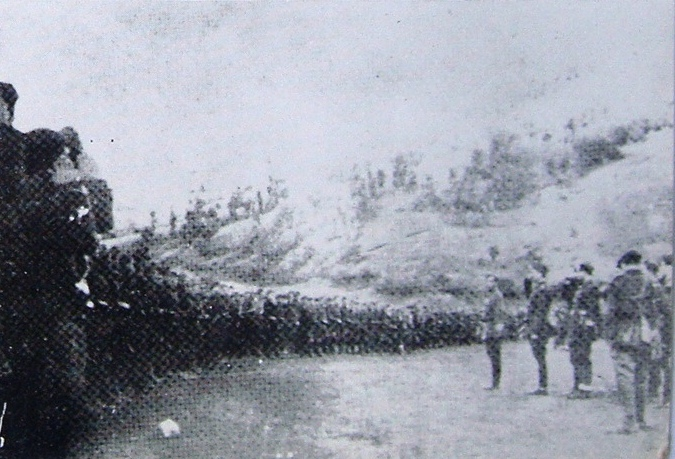
Formation of the 51st Division in Shirok Dol, October 1944.

The People's Liberation Army of Macedonia (Macedonian: Народноослободителна војска на Македонија (НОВМ), romanized: Narodnoosloboditelna vojska na Makedonija (NOVM)) was founded on the date of the creation of its major unit, the Mirče Acev battalion, on August 18, 1943, on Mount Slavej between Ohrid and Kičevo, then in the Italian occupation zone. Today is officially celebrated in North Macedonia as the Day of the Army of the Republic of North Macedonia. The CPM stressed the Macedonian character of the NOVM, Macedonian officers ran it and propagated national liberation of all Macedonians and unification, thus attracting more and more Macedonians to join NOVM. The capitulation of Italy and the Soviet victories over Nazi Germany turned the tide in the war and the partisans went from victory to victory. On 11 November 1943, the 1st Macedonian Kosovo Assault Brigade was formed in western Macedonia by merging two Vardar Macedonian and one Kosovo battalion. The second — larger ethnic Macedonian military unit was the 2nd Macedonian Assault Brigade, formed on 22 December 1943 just across the border in Greek Macedonia. On 26 February 1944 in the village of Zegljane, near Kumanovo, the 3rd Macedonian Assault Brigade was formed. These three brigades were the nucleus of the National Liberation Army of Macedonia, which after constant battles became stronger in numbers. Meanwhile, the second session of AVNOJ recognized the Macedonians as a separate nation for the first time in November 1943. Multiple detachments were also formed early on during the resistance, majority of them being named after IMRO revolutionaries to invoke a sense of national liberation and revolutionary tradition, thereby rallying support for the anti-fascist struggle. These units drew inspiration from figures like Jane Sandanski and the Ilinden Uprising, connecting their cause to a broader history of Macedonian resistance. From 8,000 partisans in the summer of 1944, until the final military operations in the Yugoslav National Liberation War in April 1945, the National Liberation Army of Macedonia had increased to three corps, seven divisions and thirty brigades, all with a total of 100,000 regular soldiers. Chronological composition by the number of the members of MNLA (partisans, their helpers, etc.) was as follows:

	Late 1941	Late 1942	September 1943	Late 1943	August 1944	Late 1944
Macedonia	1,000	2,000	10,000	7,000	8,000	66,000

== Commanders ==
- Mirče Acev
- Kuzman Josifovski Pitu
- Mihajlo Apostolski
- Metodija Andonov-Čento
- Svetozar Vukmanović-Tempo

== Orders of battle ==
=== Brigades ===
- 1st Macedonian Auto-Brigade
- 1st Macedonian Cavalry Brigade
- 1st Aegean Assault Brigade
- 1st Macedonian Brigade
- 2nd Macedonian Brigade
- 3rd Macedonian Brigade
- 4th Macedonian Brigade
- 5th Macedonian Brigade
- 6th Macedonian Brigade
- 7th Macedonian Brigade
- 8th Macedonian Brigade
- 9th Macedonian Brigade
- 10th Macedonian Brigade
- 11th Macedonian Brigade
- 12th Macedonian Brigade
- 13th Macedonian Brigade
- 14th Macedonian Brigade Dimitar Vlahov
- 15th Macedonian Brigade
- 16th Macedonian Brigade
- 17th Macedonian Brigade
- 18th Macedonian Brigade
- 19th Macedonian Brigade
- 20th Macedonian Brigade
- 21st Macedonian Brigade
- 11th Macedonian Brigade (41st Macedonian Division)
- Gotse Delchev Brigade

=== Corps ===
- 15th Corps (operated in Zemun)
- 16th Corps
- Bregalnica-Strumica Corps

=== Divisions ===
- 41st Macedonian Division (General Staff of Macedonia)
- 42nd Macedonian Division (15th Corps)
- 48th Macedonian Division (15th Corps)
- 49th Macedonian Division
- 50th Macedonian Division
- 51st Macedonian Division
- Kumanovo Division

== See also ==
- Military history of North Macedonia

== Notes and references ==
Notes

== Sources ==
- Babić, Anto, ed. (1968). Enciklopedija Jugoslavije, 7: R-Srbija (in Serbian). Zagreb: Yugoslav Lexicographical Institute. OCLC 58574765.
- Bechev, Dimitar (2009). Historical Dictionary of the Republic of Macedonia. Scarecrow Press. ISBN 978-0810862951.
- Georgieva, Valentina; Konechni, Sasha (1998). Historical Dictionary of the Republic of Macedonia. Scarecrow Press. ISBN 0-8108-3336-0.
- Gogov, Rade (16 October 2006). "Зимските операции на Македонска војска 1943/44" [The winter operations of the Macedonian army 1943/1944] (in Macedonian). Utrinski vesnik. Archived from the original on 10 February 2012.
- Lee Miller, Marshall (1975). Bulgaria During the Second World War. Stanford University Press. ISBN 0804708703.
- Livanios, Dimitris (2008). The Macedonian Question: Britain and the Southern Balkans 1939-1949. Oxford University Press. ISBN 978-0191528729.
- Meier, Viktor (2005). Yugoslavia: A History of Its Demise. Routledge. ISBN 1134665113.
- Popovski, Jovan (1962). НОБ на Македонија [National Liberation War of Macedonia] (in Macedonian). Skopje.
- Poulton, Hugh (2000). Who Are the Macedonians?. C. Hurst & Co. Publishers. ISBN 9780253213594.
- Rossos, Andrew; Evans, P. H. (April 1991). "The Macedonians of Aegean Macedonia: A British Officer's Report, 1944". The Slavonic and East European Review. 69 (2). Modern Humanities Research Association and School of Slavonic and East European Studies: 282–309. JSTOR 4210592.
- Stojanovski, Aleksandar; Katardžiev, Ivan; Zografski, Dančo (1988). Историја на македонскиот народ [History of the Macedonian Nation] (in Macedonian). Skopje.
- Trifunovska, Snežana (1994). Yugoslavia Through Documents: From Its Creation to Its Dissolution. Martinus Nijhoff Publishers. ISBN 0-7923-2670-9.
- "History of the Army of the Republic of Macedonia – World War II". Ministry of Defense of North Macedonia. Archived from the original on 20 November 2008.
