= Mara Naceva =

- Мара Нацева
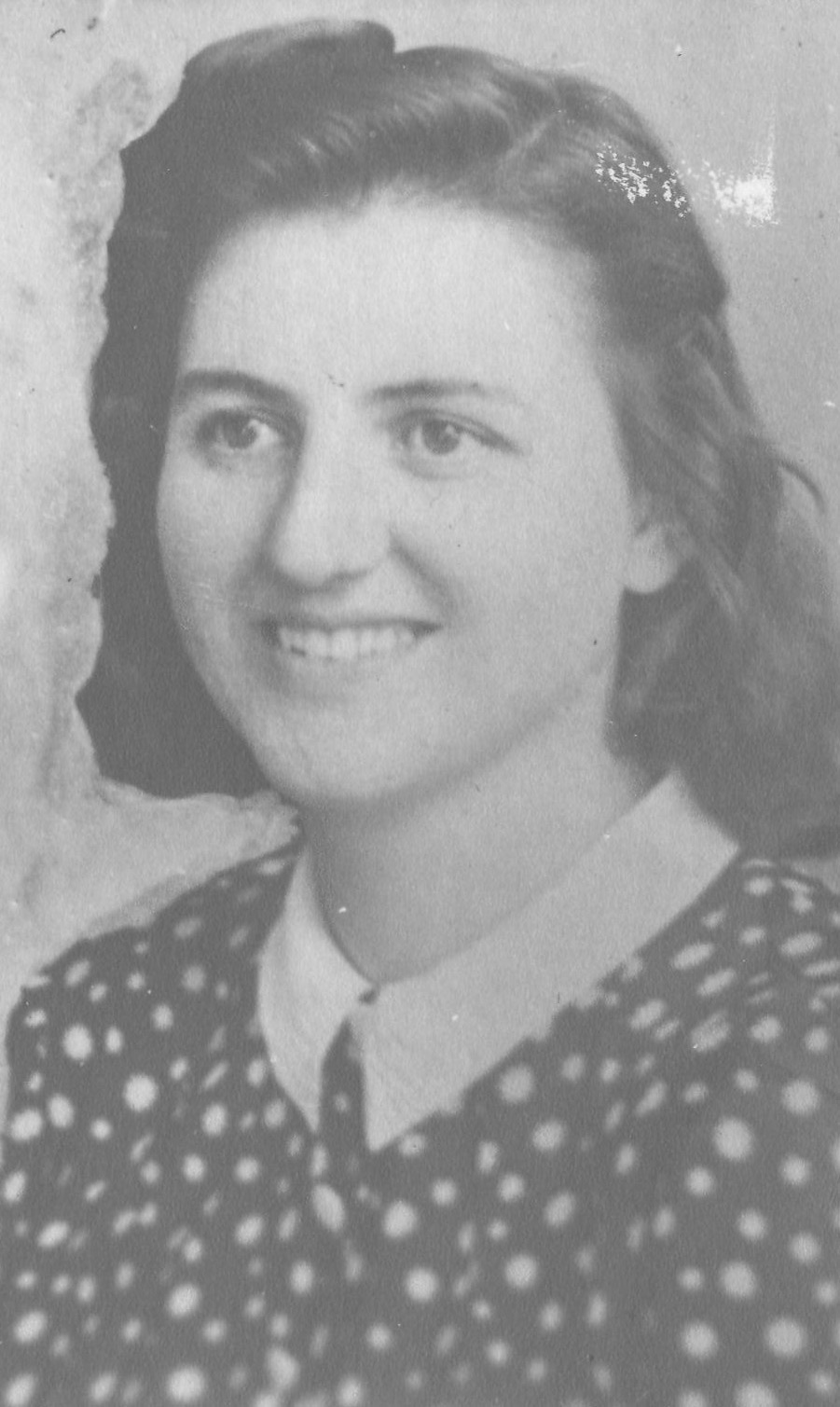
- Born: 28 September 1920; Kumanovo, Kingdom of Serbs, Croats and Slovenes (present-day North Macedonia)
- Died: 1 July 2013 (aged 92); Kumanovo, Republic of Macedonia
- Spouse: Savo Drljević

Mara Naceva (Macedonian: Мара Нацева; 28 September 1920 – 1 July 2013) was a Macedonian communist and partisan. She was awarded the Order of the People's Hero on 29 November 1953. She was the last surviving ethnic Macedonian recipient of this medal.

== Biography ==
Naceva was born on September 28, 1920, in Kumanovo. She finished primary school in her hometown. At the age of 15, she became a textile worker. In 1936, she led a strike at her factory, for which she was fired. She became a member of the Young Communist League of Yugoslavia.

In 1939, she left for Niš and became a member of the Communist Party of Yugoslavia. A year later, Naceva became a member of the Local Committee and the District Committee of the CPY of Niš, and was arrested twice. She participated during the fifth ground conference of the CPY in Zagreb as a delegate from Serbia.

After the occupation of Yugoslavia, Naceva was a member of the Regional Committee of Communists in Macedonia. In the summer of 1942, she was arrested by Bulgarian police and was sent to a camp for women near Asenovgrad. Fellow party member Strašo Pindžur tried to find ways to release his friend Mara Naceva from prison.

In March 1943, she was elected organizational secretary of the Communist Party of Macedonia in absentia. Naceva also became a delegate of the Anti-Fascist Council for the National Liberation of Yugoslavia.

After her release from the camp in the Autumn of the same year, Naceva participated in the Partisan activity near Kumanovo. She became a member of the Anti-fascist Assembly for the National Liberation of Macedonia during its first session in August 1944.

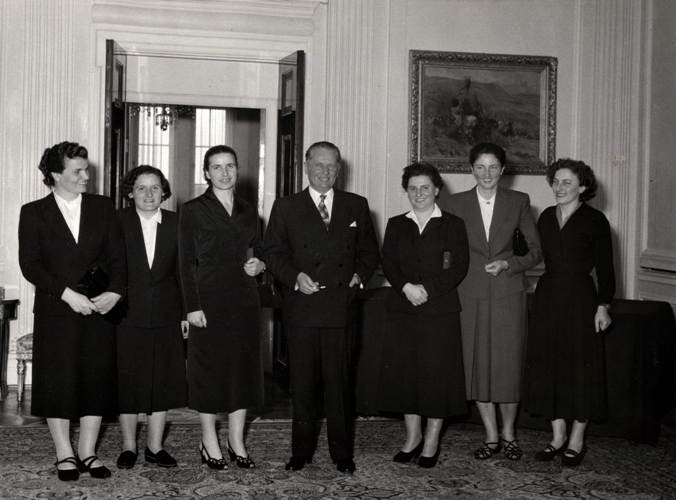
Naceva together with other women recipients of the Order of the People's Hero and Josip Broz Tito.

After the Second World War, Naceva was elected a member of the Central Committee of the Communist Party of Yugoslavia. She also became the vice-president of the Women's Antifascist Front of Yugoslavia. Naceva was also the president of the board of the Women's Antifascist Front of Macedonia.

Naceva was ordained with the Order of National Liberation and the Order of the People's Hero.

She died in Kumanovo on 1 July 2013, where she is buried.
