= Jakov Lazaroski =

Yugoslav-Macedonian political commissar (1936–2021)

President of the Central Committee of the League of Communists of Macedonia
- In office June 1986 – 1989
- Preceded by: Milan Pančevski
- Succeeded by: Petar Gošev

Personal details
- Born: 18 October 1936 Oktisi, Kingdom of Yugoslavia
- Died: 16 May 2021 (aged 84)
- Party: Macedonian branch of the League of Communists of Yugoslavia

Jakov Lazaroski (Macedonian: Јаков Лазароски; 18 October 1936 – 16 May 2021) was a Yugoslav-Macedonian political commissar and academic.

== Biography ==
Born in Oktisi in 1936, Lazaroski graduated from the Faculty of Philosophy, University of Belgrade in 1959. He earned a master's degree in 1970 and a doctorate in 1990. He began working as an industrial psychologist before moving to Skopje to work at the Service for Psychological Research at the Republic Secretariat for Internal Affairs. He became an assistant professor at the Institute for Sociological and Political-Legal Research in Skopje in 1966 and a research associate in 1969. In 1972, he became a lecturer at the Faculty of Philosophy in Skopje and a full professor of psychology in 1996.

In addition to his academic work, Lazaroski served on the Central Committee of the League of Communists of Macedonia, of which he was president from 1986 to 1989. He also served on the Central Committee of the League of Communists of Yugoslavia.

Jakov Lazaroski died on 16 May 2021 at the age of 84. The cause of death has not been disclosed.
