= League of Communists of Macedonia =

Yugoslav Macedonian political party

League of Communists of Macedonia Macedonian: Сојуз на комунистите на Македонија
- Leader: President of the League of Communists of Macedonia
- Founded: 19 March 1943
- Dissolved: 20 April 1991
- Preceded by: Regional Committee of Communists in Macedonia
- Succeeded by: Social Democratic Union of Macedonia
- Headquarters: Skopje, SR Macedonia, SFR Yugoslavia
- Ideology: Communism; Marxism–Leninism; Titoism
- Political position: Left-wing to far-left
- National affiliation: League of Communists of Yugoslavia
- Colours: Red

Party flag
- Politics of North Macedonia; Political parties; Elections; Macedonian branch of the League of Communists of Yugoslavia

The League of Communists of Macedonia (Macedonian: Сојуз на комунистите на Македонија (СКМ); Sojuz na komunistite na Makedonija, SKM) was the Macedonian branch of the ruling League of Communists of Yugoslavia during the period 1943 – 1990. It was formed on the basis of the Regional Committee of Communists in Macedonia under the name Communist Party of Macedonia (Комунистичка партија на Македонија (КПМ); Komunistička partija na Makedonija, KPM) during World War II in Yugoslav Macedonia (also known as the People's Liberation Struggle). It retained that name until April 1952. The League of Communists of Macedonia was the ruling political party in the Socialist Republic of Macedonia.

After the introduction of political pluralism in 1990, the party renamed itself to League of Communists of Macedonia – Party for Democratic Change (Macedonian: Сојуз на комунистите на Македонија – Партија за демократска преобразба [СКМ-ПДП]; Sojuz na Komunistite na Makedonija – Partija za Demokratska Preobrazba, [SKM-PDP]) and was led by Petar Gošev, taking part in the first democratic elections in the same year. On its 11th Congress on 20 April 1991, the party was reformed, changing its socialist ideology to social democracy (similar to other former communist bloc countries), and refounding itself as the Social Democratic Union of Macedonia. There was a small minority of SKM members which retained the old name and constituted a distinct political entity, founded in 1992 under the name Communist Party of Macedonia – Freedom Movement; in 2015 this party became one of the principal creators of the far-left party The Left.

== History ==
=== Background ===
After the Comintern's January 1934 resolution on the Macedonian nation and language, at the Fourth Conference of the Communist Party of Yugoslavia (CPY) in December, the Central Committee (CC) recognized the existence of a Macedonian national identity and advocated for the creation of the Communist Party of Macedonia. In November 1940 the Regional Committee of Communists in Macedonia recognized separately from the CC of CPY a distinct Macedonian national identity, but continued also using the term "Macedonian" as a supranational term. During World War II in Yugoslavia, in 1941 and throughout 1942, the resistance against the Axis powers in occupied Yugoslav Macedonia lagged behind than in other parts of Yugoslavia. After the Bulgarian takeover of most of then Vardar Banovina in April 1941, the local communists fell into the sphere of influence of the Bulgarian Communist Party (BCP). The BCP supported the idea of an independent and unified Macedonia, contrary to the stance of the Yugoslav communists. At that time most Macedonian communists were not yet lured to Yugoslav communists' agenda as they feared a reestablishment of the previous oppressive rule and the regional committee was de facto under control of the BCP. As a result, the factionalist struggle between the pro-Bulgarian and the pro-Yugoslav Macedonians exacerbated.

=== Foundation ===
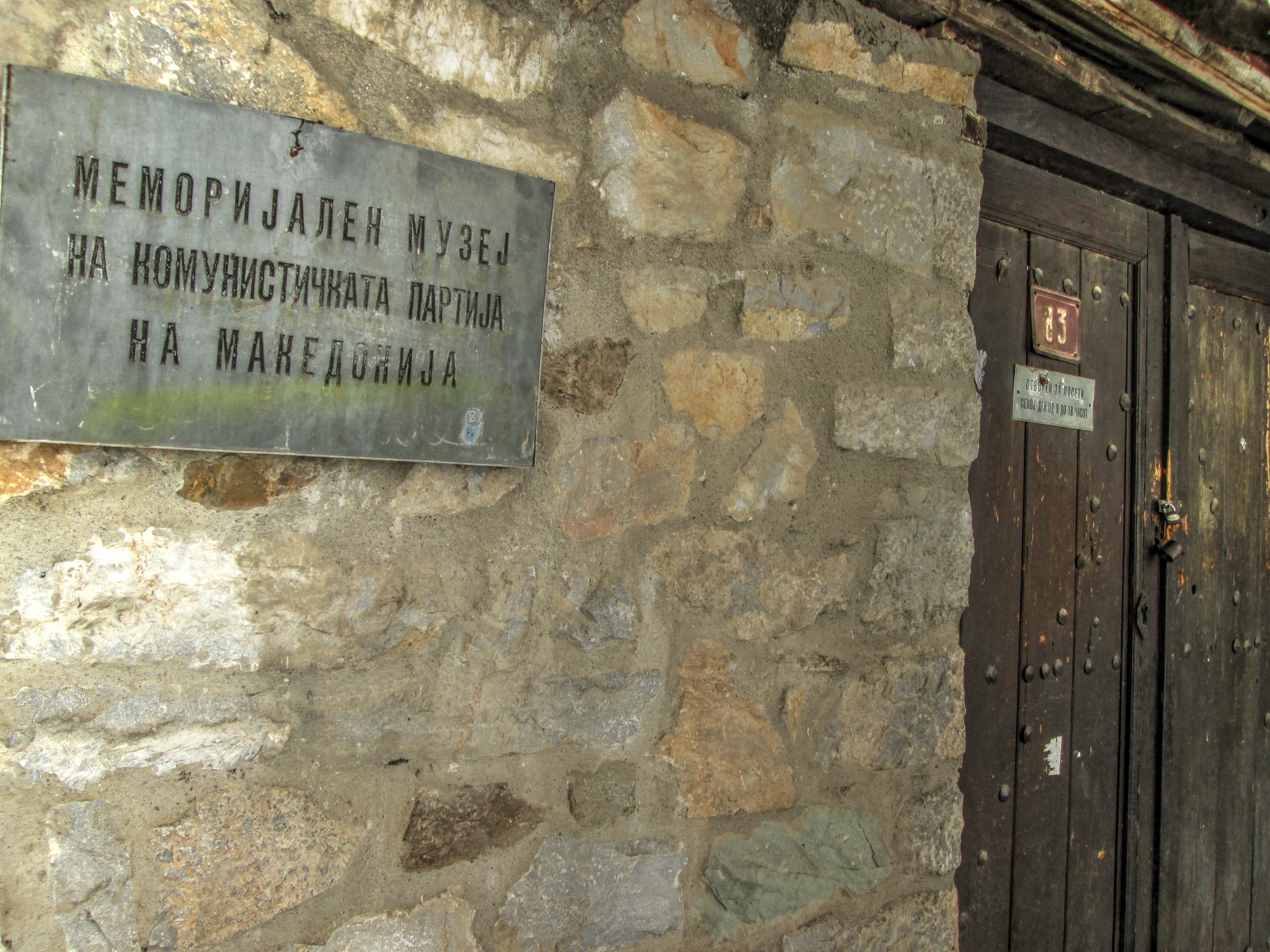
Museum of the Communist Party of Macedonia in Tetovo, located in the house, where it was founded.

The situation changed in February 1943, when the Axis forces lost the Battle of Stalingrad. In March Tito's envoy Svetozar Vukmanović arrived in Macedonia as a representative of the Communist Party of Yugoslavia's central committee and Anti-Fascist Council for the National Liberation of Yugoslavia (AVNOJ). The Supreme Headquarters of AVNOJ realized that securing mass participation would require to "Macedonianize" the struggle's form and content. The Communist Party of Yugoslavia's plan was to have the party operate only in Vardar Macedonia and include only activists loyal to the Yugoslav agenda. The Communist Party of Macedonia (CPM) was created on 19 March 1943 by the Communist Party of Yugoslavia in Tetovo in the Italian-occupation zone of Yugoslavia (in then Kingdom of Albania), on the basis of the previous Regional Committee of Communists in Macedonia. The first Central Committee consisted of Kuzman Josifovski Pitu, Bane Andreev, Cvetko Uzunovski, Strahil Gigov, Mara Naceva and Lazar Koliševski. Naceva and Koliševski were absent, as they were imprisoned in Bulgaria at the time. The CPM would lead the struggle, not for the restoration of old Yugoslavia but for above all liberation and unification of Macedonia within a new federal union of Yugoslav peoples with an extension of its prewar territory.

=== Yugoslav era ===
After 1944, the CPM became the main ruling party of the People's Republic of Macedonia. The party initiated pro-Bulgarian purges in January 1945. The party's first congress was held in 1948. The CPM was renamed to League of Communists of Macedonia (LCM) in April 1952. The party was under the control of Macedonians, who dominated the membership. Under the direction of the Communist Party of Yugoslavia (CPY), it regulated the new republic's relations with ethnic minorities and inter-ethnic relations. In 1965, LCLM proceeded to increase minority representation in the highest bodies of the party. In mid-1989, during the revolutions, LCM committed itself to introducing a multi-party system in the Socialist Republic of Macedonia. The party held its Tenth Congress in Skopje from 26 to 28 November 1989, when Petar Gošev became its leader. The old dogmatic party leadership, which had been pro-Serbian, was replaced. It renamed itself to League of Communists of Macedonia – Party for Democratic Transformation. On 7 April 1990, the party decided to leave the League of Communists of Yugoslavia. The party took part in the first multi-party elections in December, when it was defeated by the nationalist VMRO-DPMNE but it gained 31 seats. In 1991, the party was succeeded by the Social Democratic Union of Macedonia on 20 April 1991.

== Gallery ==
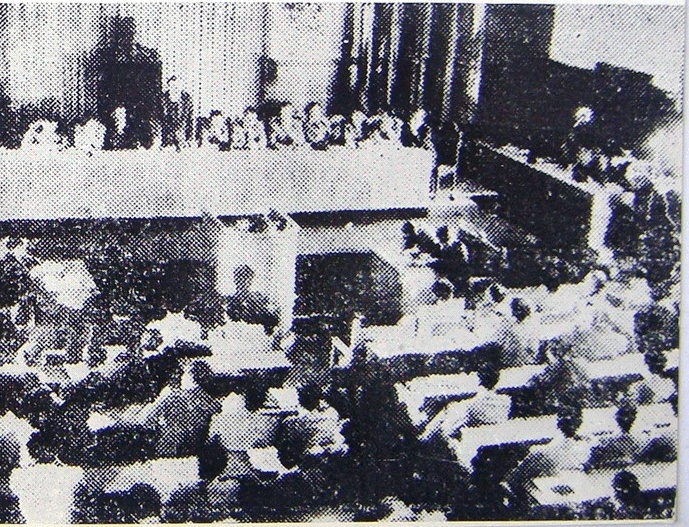
Part of the delegates at the I Congress of the CPM, held on December 20, 1948, Skopje.

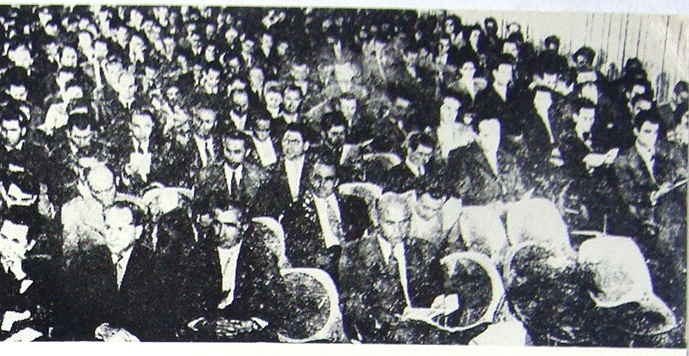
Part of the delegates at the II Congress of the CPM, held on May 29, 1954, Skopje.

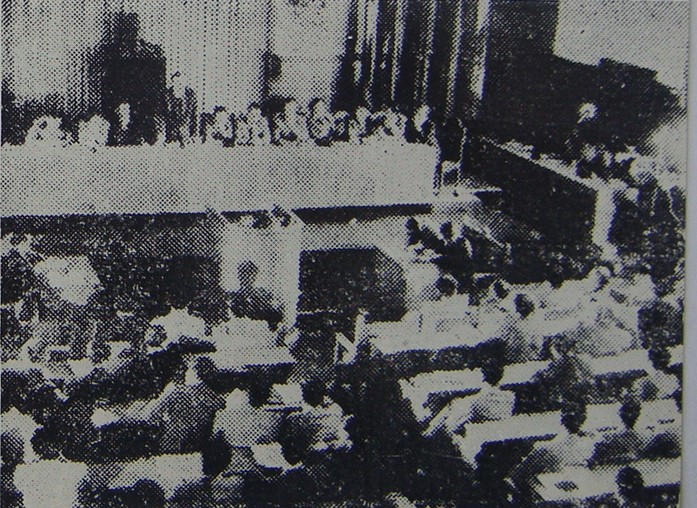
Delegates at the III Congress of the CPM, held on June 22, 1959, Skopje.

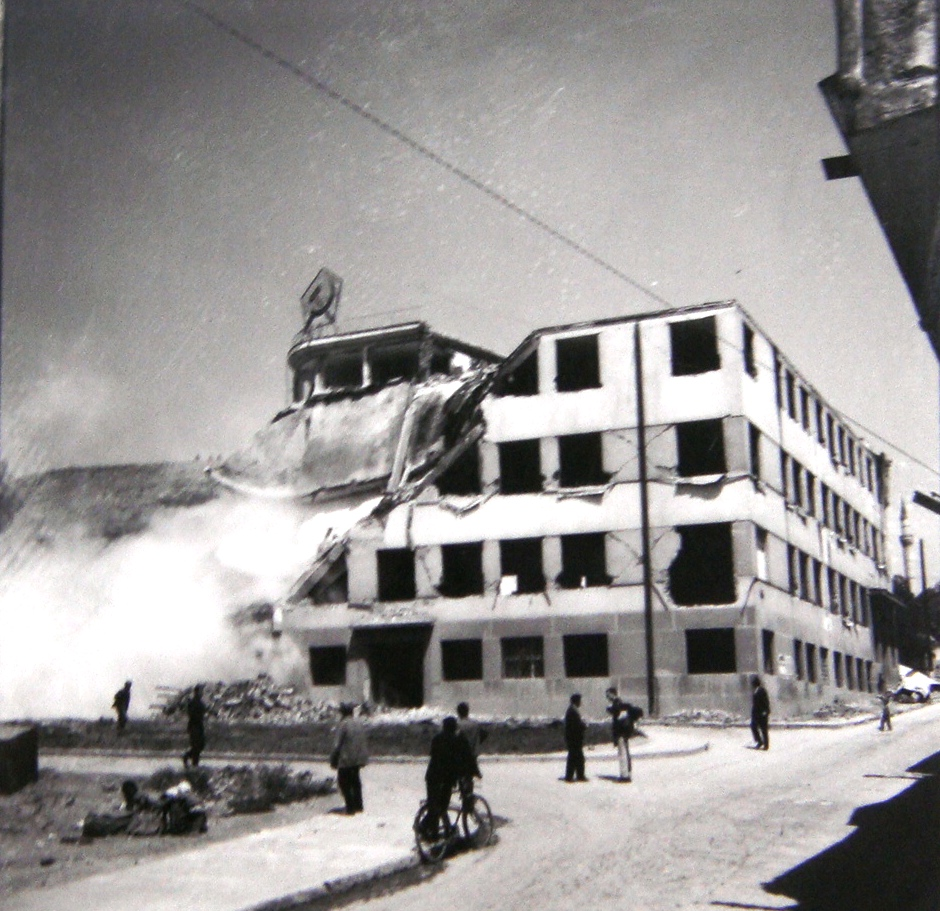
1963 Skopje earthquake: The building of the Central Committee of the CPM

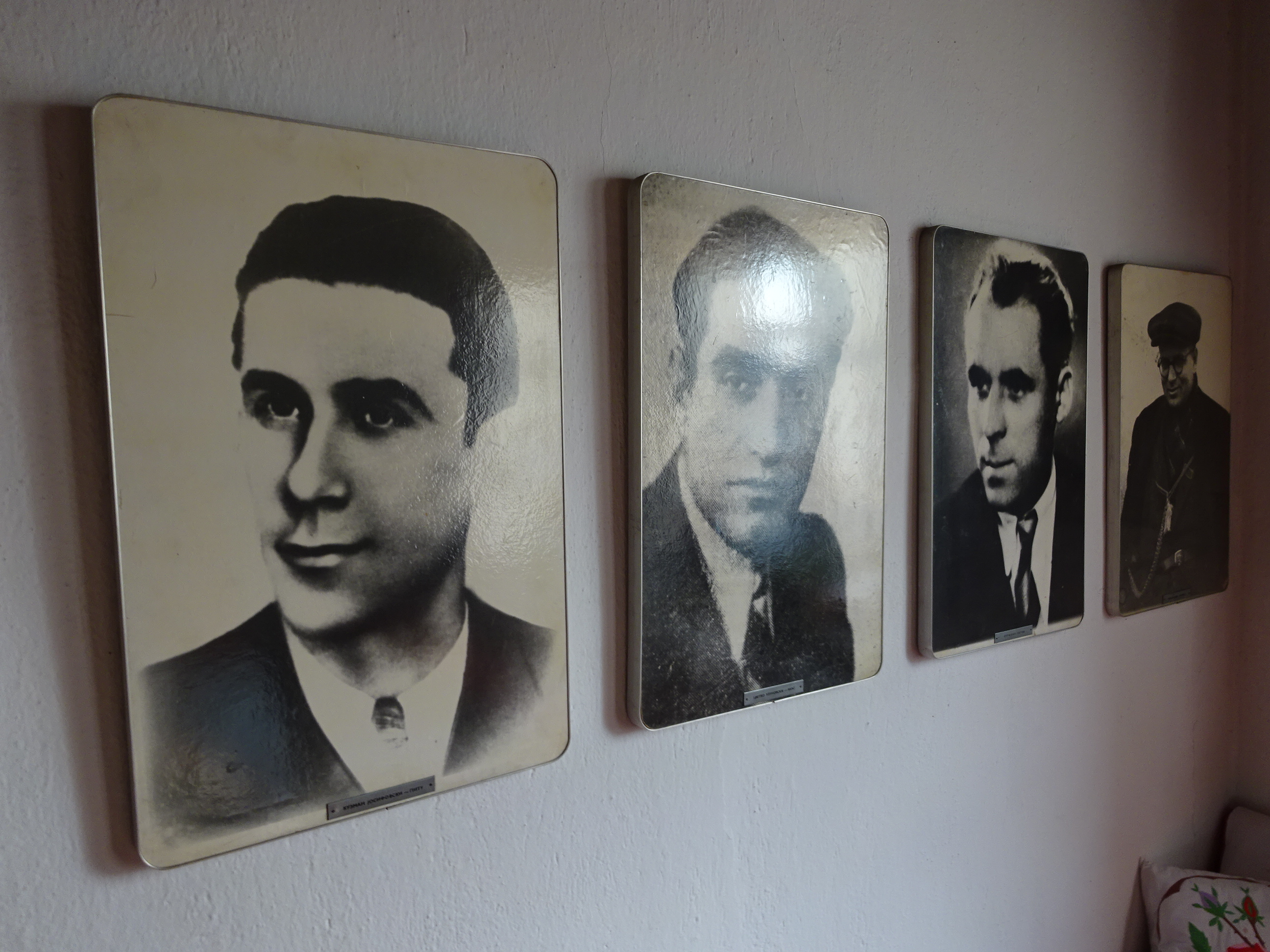
Portraits of part of the members of the first Central Committee of CPM in 1943

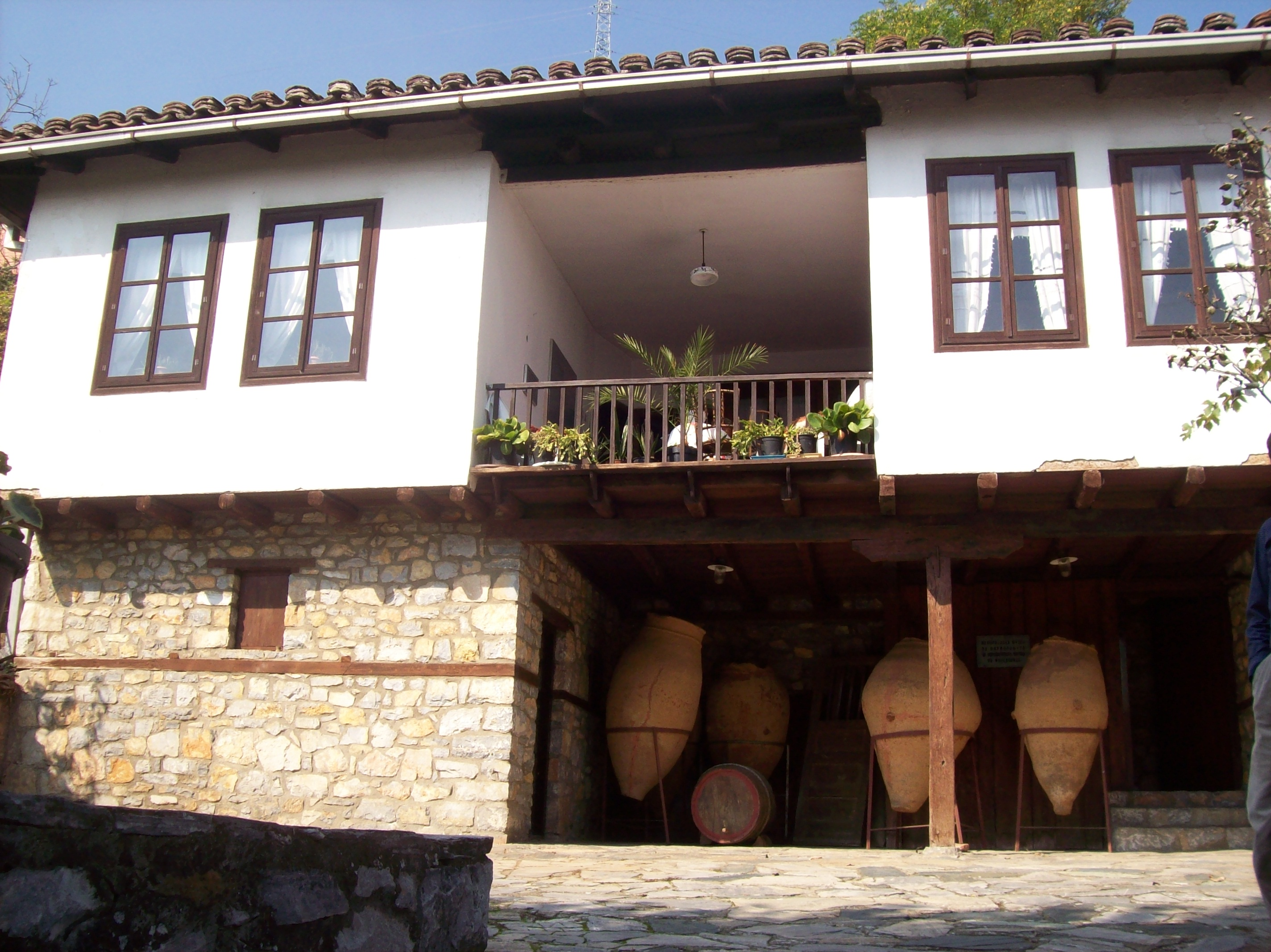
The house of the Jovanov family in the old part of Tetovo in which CPM was formed

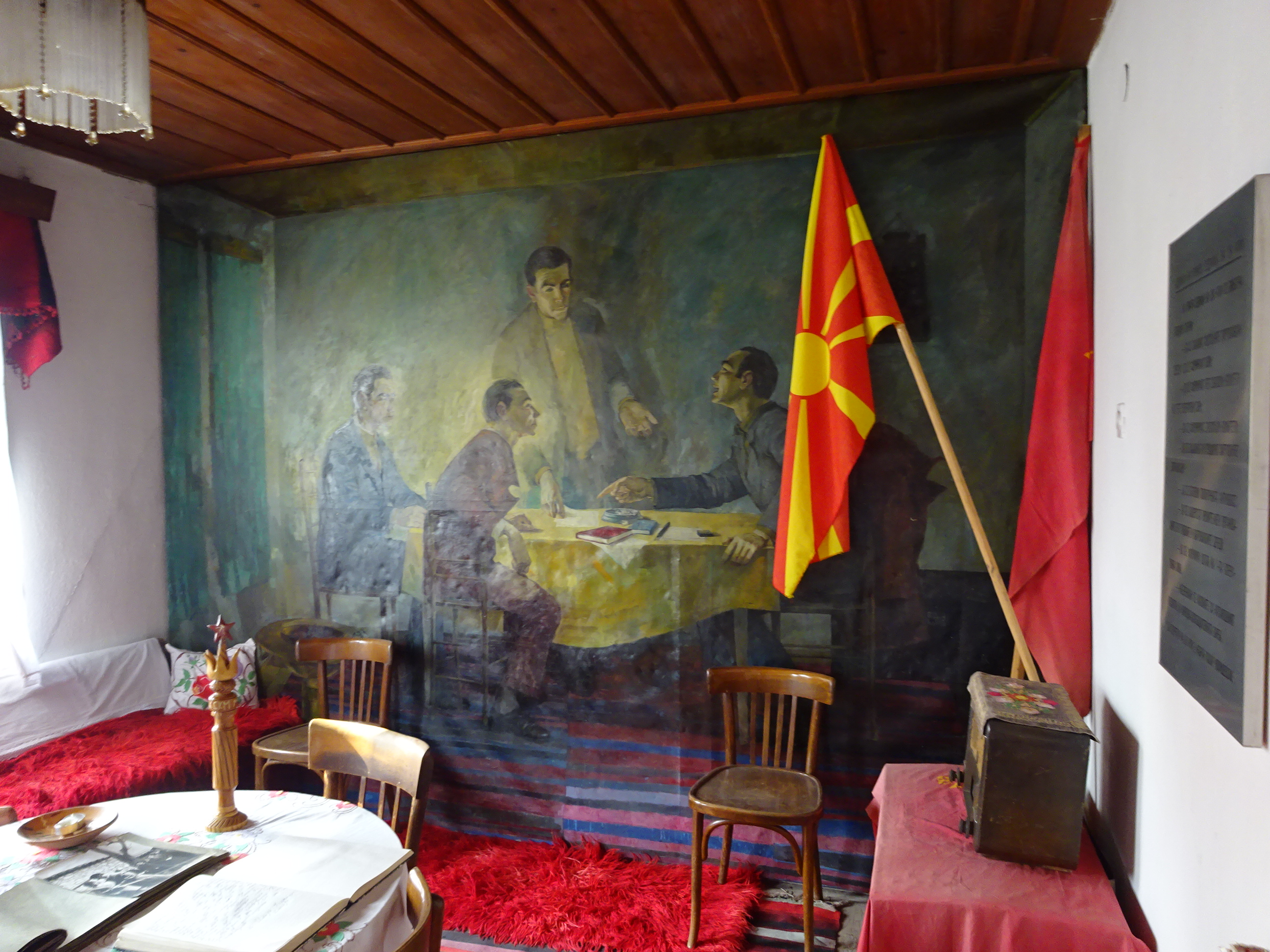
Inside the Museum of CPM

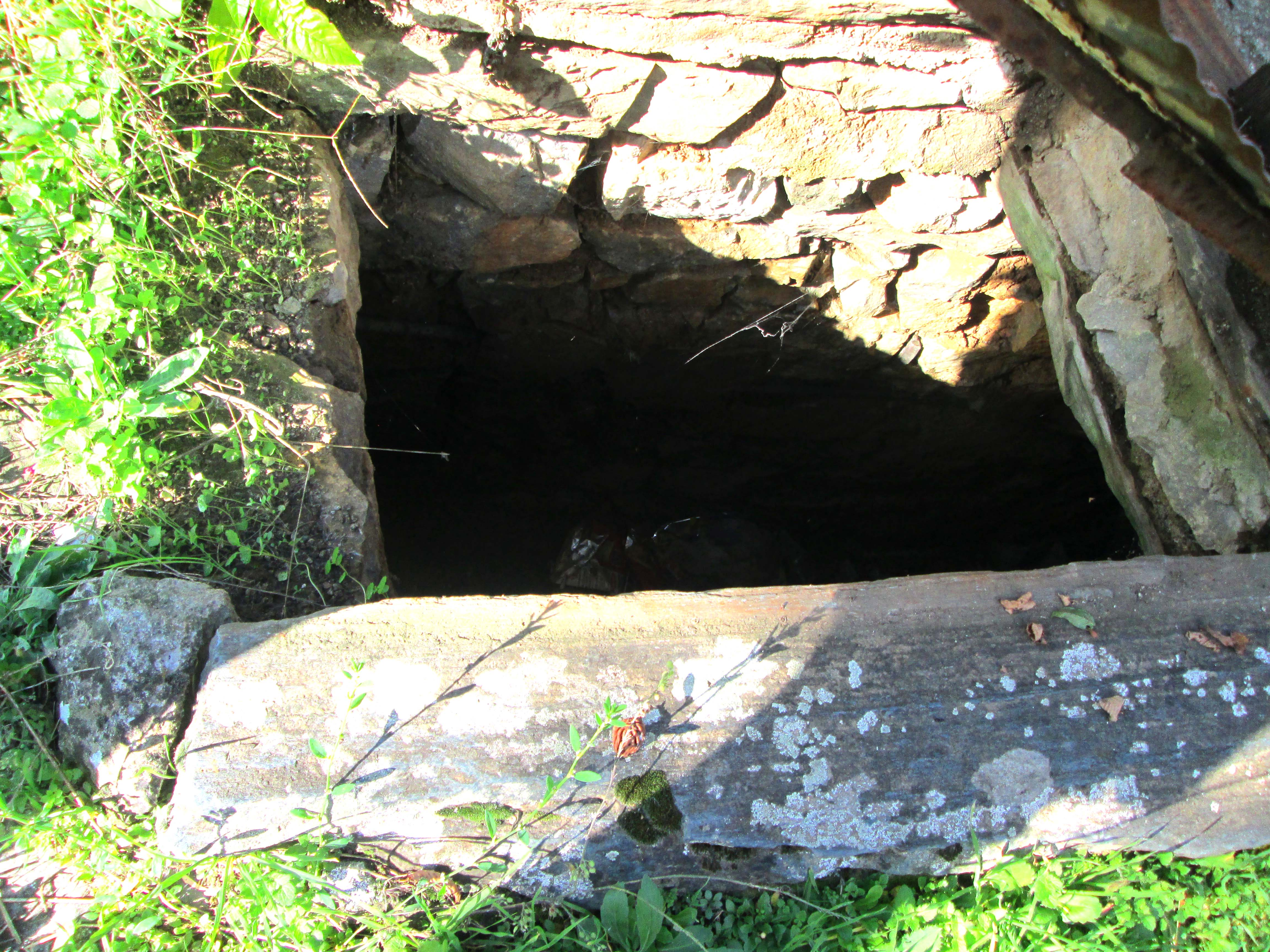
Hideout room in the ground behind the house museum

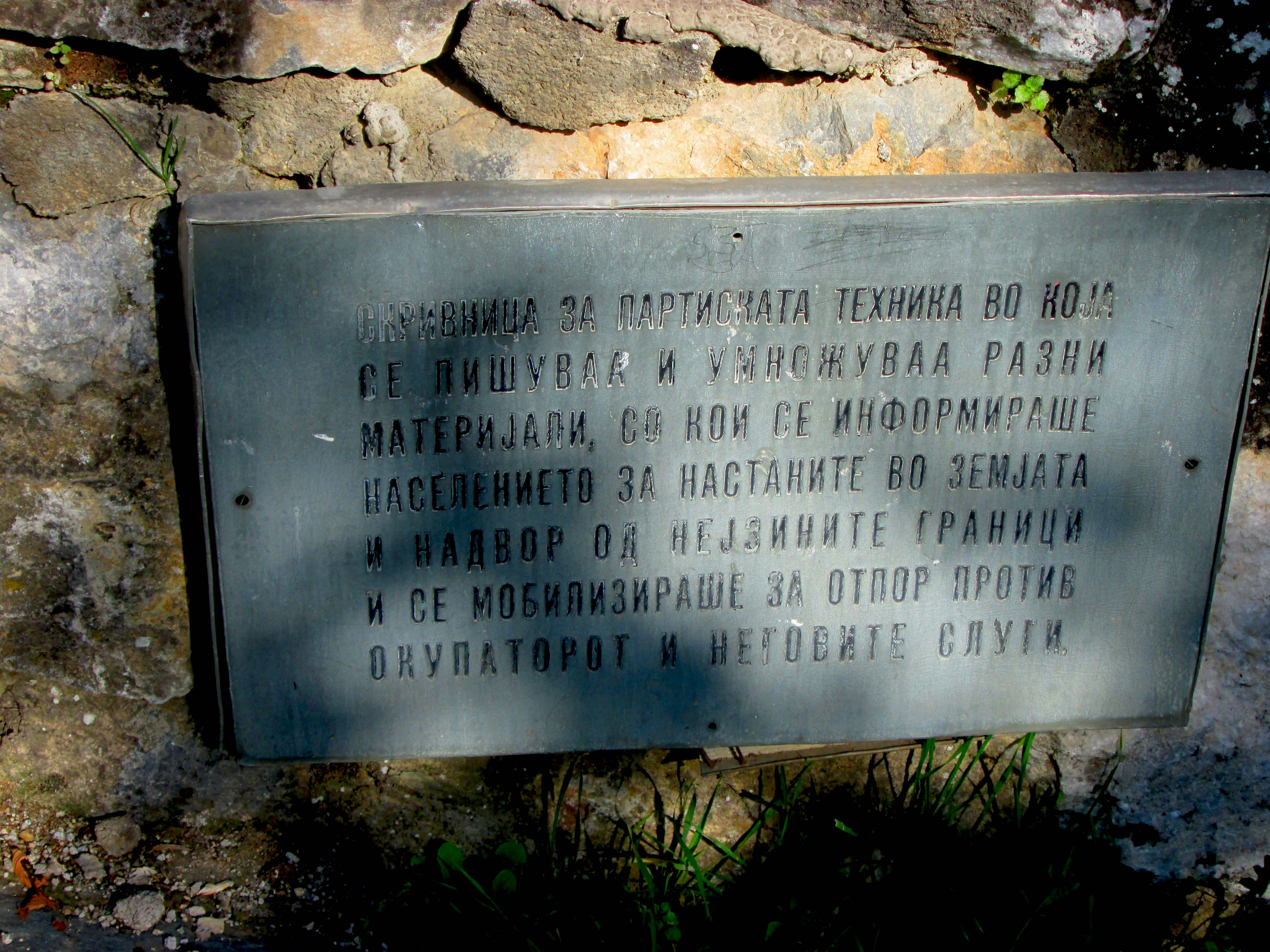
Memorial plaque for the hideout room in which materials were written, with whom the population was informed and mobilized for the resistance

== Party leaders ==
The official name of the office was changed in May 1982 from Secretary of the Central Committee to President of the Presidency of the Central Committee of the League of Communists of Macedonia.

1. Lazar Koliševski (September 1944 – July 1963)
2. Krste Crvenkovski (July 1963 – March 1969)
3. Angel Čemerski (March 1969 – May 1982)
4. Krste Markovski (May 1982 – 5 May 1984)
5. Milan Pančevski (5 May 1984 – June 1986)
6. Jakov Lazaroski (June 1986 – 1989)
7. Petar Gošev (1989 – 20 April 1991)

== Bibliography ==
- Bechev, Dimitar (2019). Historical Dictionary of North Macedonia (2nd ed.). Rowman & Littlefield. ISBN 9781538119624.
- Banac, Ivo (1988). With Stalin Against Tito: Cominformist Splits in Yugoslav Communism. Cornell University Press. ISBN 0801421861.
- Cook, Bernard A. (2001). Europe Since 1945: An Encyclopedia, Volume 2. Taylor & Francis. ISBN 9780815340584.
- Daskalov, Roumen; Mishkova, Diana (2013). Entangled Histories of the Balkans - Volume Two: Transfers of Political Ideologies and Institutions. BRILL. ISBN 9789004261914.
- Georgieva, Valentina; Konechni, Sasha (1998). Historical dictionary of the Republic of Macedonia. Scarecrow Press. ISBN 0-8108-3336-0.
- Lemke, Christiane; Marks, Gary (1992). The Crisis of Socialism in Europe. Duke University Press. ISBN 9780822311973.
- Livanios, Dimiris (2008). The Macedonian Question: Britain and the Southern Balkans 1939-1949. OUP Oxford. ISBN 0191528722.
- Meier, Viktor (1999). Yugoslavia: A History of its Demise. Routledge. ISBN 9780415185950.
- Poulton, Hugh (1995). Who are the Macedonians?. C. Hurst & Co. Publishers. ISBN 9781850652380.
- Rossos, Andrew (2013). Macedonia and the Macedonians: A History. Hoover Press. ISBN 9780817948832.
- Horncastle, James (2019). The Macedonian Slavs in the Greek Civil War, 1944–1949. Rowman & Littlefield. ISBN 1498585051.
- Simkus, Albert; Listhaug, Ola; Ramet, Sabrina (2013). Civic and Uncivic Values in Macedonia: Value Transformation, Education and Media. Palgrave Macmillan. ISBN 9781137302823.
