= Lazar Koliševski =

Yugoslav political leader

- Лазар Колишевски
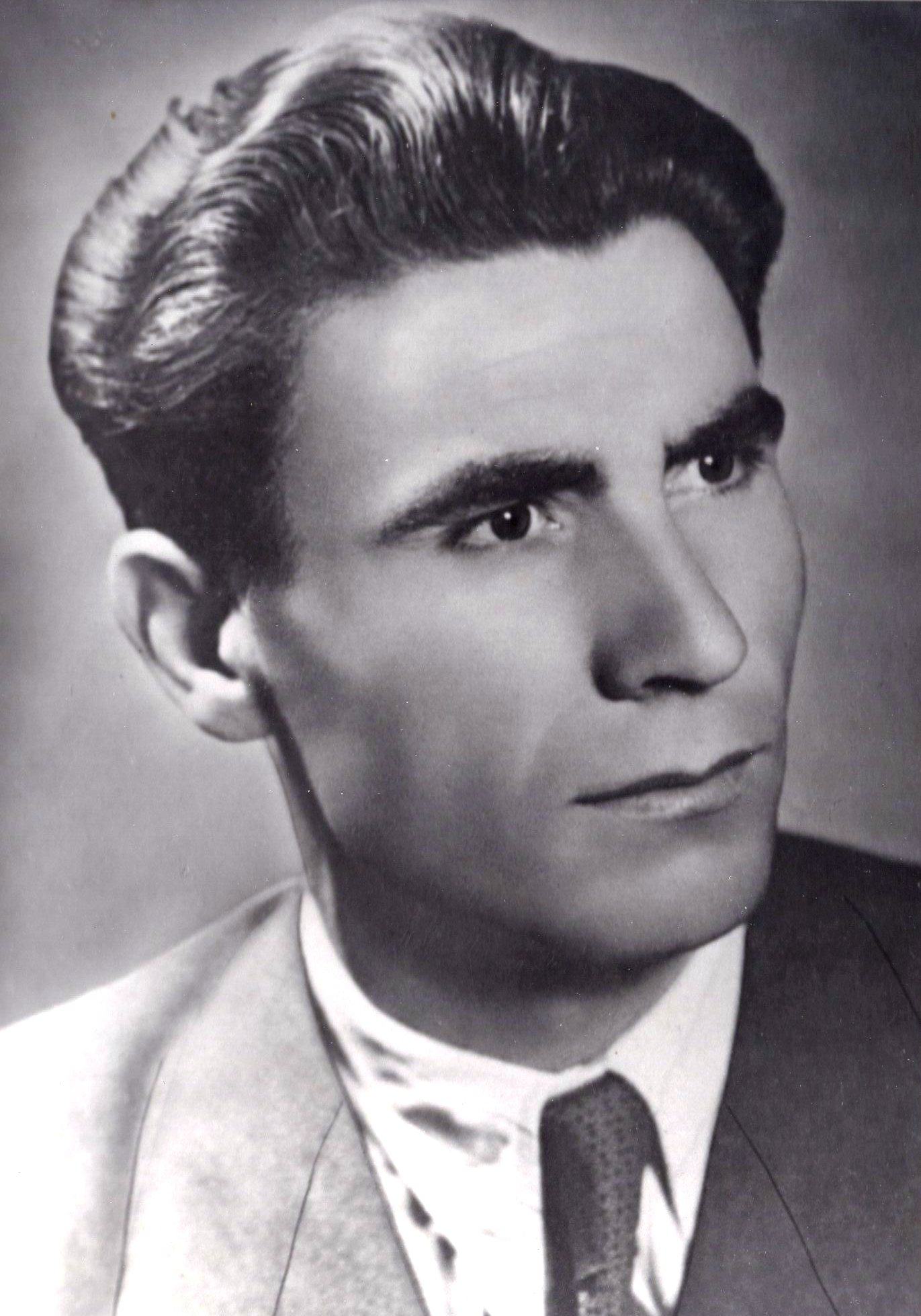

President of the Presidency of Yugoslavia
- In office 4 May 1980 – 15 May 1980
- Prime Minister: Veselin Đuranović
- Preceded by: Josip Broz Tito (as President of the Republic)
- Succeeded by: Cvijetin Mijatović

6th President of the People's Assembly of the People's Republic of Macedonia
- In office 19 December 1953 – 26 June 1962
- Prime Minister: Ljupčo Arsov; Aleksandar Grlickov
- Preceded by: Dimce Stojanov
- Succeeded by: Ljupčo Arsov

1st President of the Executive Council of People's Republic of Macedonia
- In office 16 April 1945 – 19 December 1953
- President: Metodija Andonov - Čento; Dimitar Vlahov
- Preceded by: Office established
- Succeeded by: Ljupčo Arsov

1st Secretary of the League of Communists of Macedonia
- In office 19 March 1943 – July 1963
- Preceded by: Office established
- Succeeded by: Krste Crvenkovski

Personal details
- Born: 12 February 1914 Sveti Nikole, Kingdom of Serbia
- Died: 6 July 2000 (aged 86) Skopje, Republic of Macedonia
- Party: League of Communists of Yugoslavia; League of Communists of Macedonia
- Awards: Order of the People's Hero; Order of People's Liberation; Order of the Hero of Socialist Labour

Lazar Koliševski (Macedonian: Лазар Колишевски [ˈlazar kɔˈliʃɛfski]; 12 February 1914 – 6 July 2000) was a Macedonian Yugoslav communist political leader in the Socialist Republic of Macedonia and briefly in the Socialist Federal Republic of Yugoslavia. He was closely allied with Josip Broz Tito.

== Early years ==
Koliševski was born on 12 February 1914 in Sveti Nikole, Kingdom of Serbia (now North Macedonia), into a poor family. His mother was an Aromanian, while his father was Slavic. According to Kosta Tsarnushanov, a MMTRO member and historian, his father Pane was a Serboman. In 1915, during the First World War, the region of Macedonia was occupied by the Kingdom of Bulgaria. His father was mobilized on the Salonica front, and during the war, both of Koliševski's parents died. Once left an orphan, he was taken by his aunts and sent to an orphanage. In 1928, he enrolled into a technical school in Kragujevac, where left-wing activism flourished. Here, he befriended future Yugoslav politicians Aleksandar Ranković and Boris Mijoski. Koliševski became influenced by communism. He graduated from a trade school in Kragujevac in 1932 and worked as a metalworker, while also joining the League of Communist Youth of Yugoslavia. In 1935, he joined the Communist Party of Yugoslavia (CPY). He went to study at the University of Belgrade and worked as party secretary in Kragujevac and Palanka before World War II.

== World War II ==
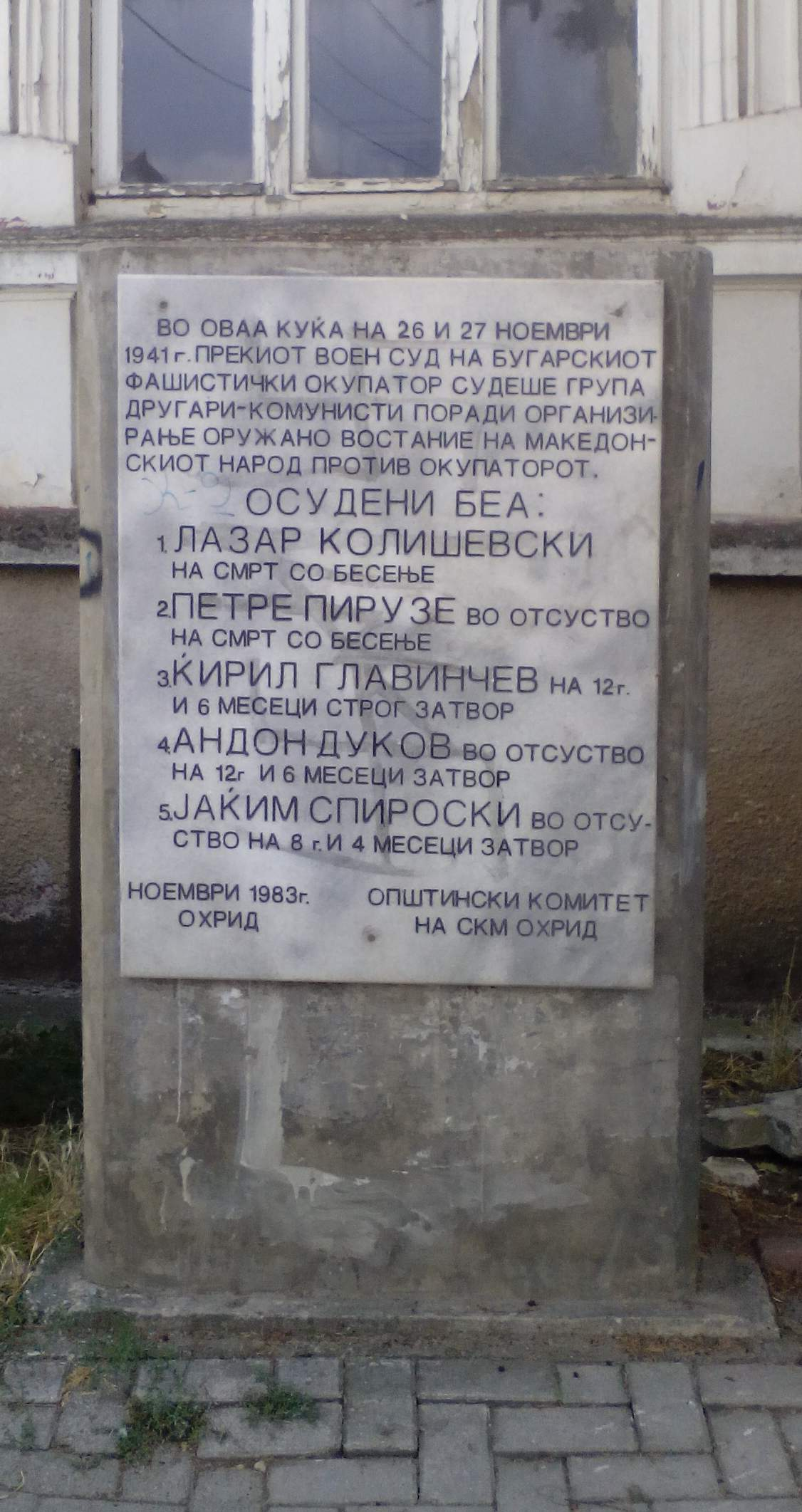
Memorial plaque from communist times, commemorating the sentencing of Koliševski and four others by the "Bulgarian Fascist Occupiers" in Ohrid

As Nazi forces entered Belgrade in April 1941, Bulgaria, a German ally, took control of a part of Vardar Macedonia, while the western towns of Tetovo, Gostivar and Debar became part of the Italian zone in Albania. After the Bulgarians had taken control of the eastern part of the former Vardar Banovina, the leader of the local faction of Communist Party of Yugoslavia, Metodi Shatorov had defected to the Bulgarian Communist Party (BCP). Koliševski was sent by CPY to Macedonia to replace the leadership of the Regional Committee, as well as challenge the influence of BCP. Koliševski conducted the policy of CPY in Macedonia. After the attack on the Soviet Union by Germany and the intervention of the Comintern, the Macedonian communist movement fell into the hands of the Yugoslav Macedonians led by him, who was pro-Serbian. He also had the task of organizing an armed resistance.

In September 1941, Koliševski became the Secretary of the Regional Committee of the Communists in Macedonia. He created the first partisan detachments in Vardar Macedonia, however they were poorly trained and organized, and were easily defeated by the Bulgarian army. After the communist attack on the Bulgarian police station in Prilep on 11 October, he was arrested a month later in Ohrid and sentenced to death by a Bulgarian military court. Koliševski's personal Bulgarian prison card in 1941 listed his nationality as Bulgarian. He wrote two appeals for clemency to the Bulgarian tsar and to the defense minister. In the appeals, he wrote that he had a Bulgarian origin. These documents are stored in the Bulgarian military archive in Veliko Tarnovo. Later, his death sentence was commuted to life imprisonment, and Koliševski was sent to a prison in Pleven, Bulgaria. However, after the fall of communism, when these documents became widely known, Koliševski denied making any appeals for clemency or admission of guilt personally. He claimed that his plea for mercy was written by his lawyer, but in relation to the death sentence of the then Bulgarian military courts, only the opportunity to submit a personally signed "appeal for clemency" existed. According to the Yugoslav politician Antun Kolendić, Koliševski vainly denied these facts, while he became familiar with these documents in 1946.

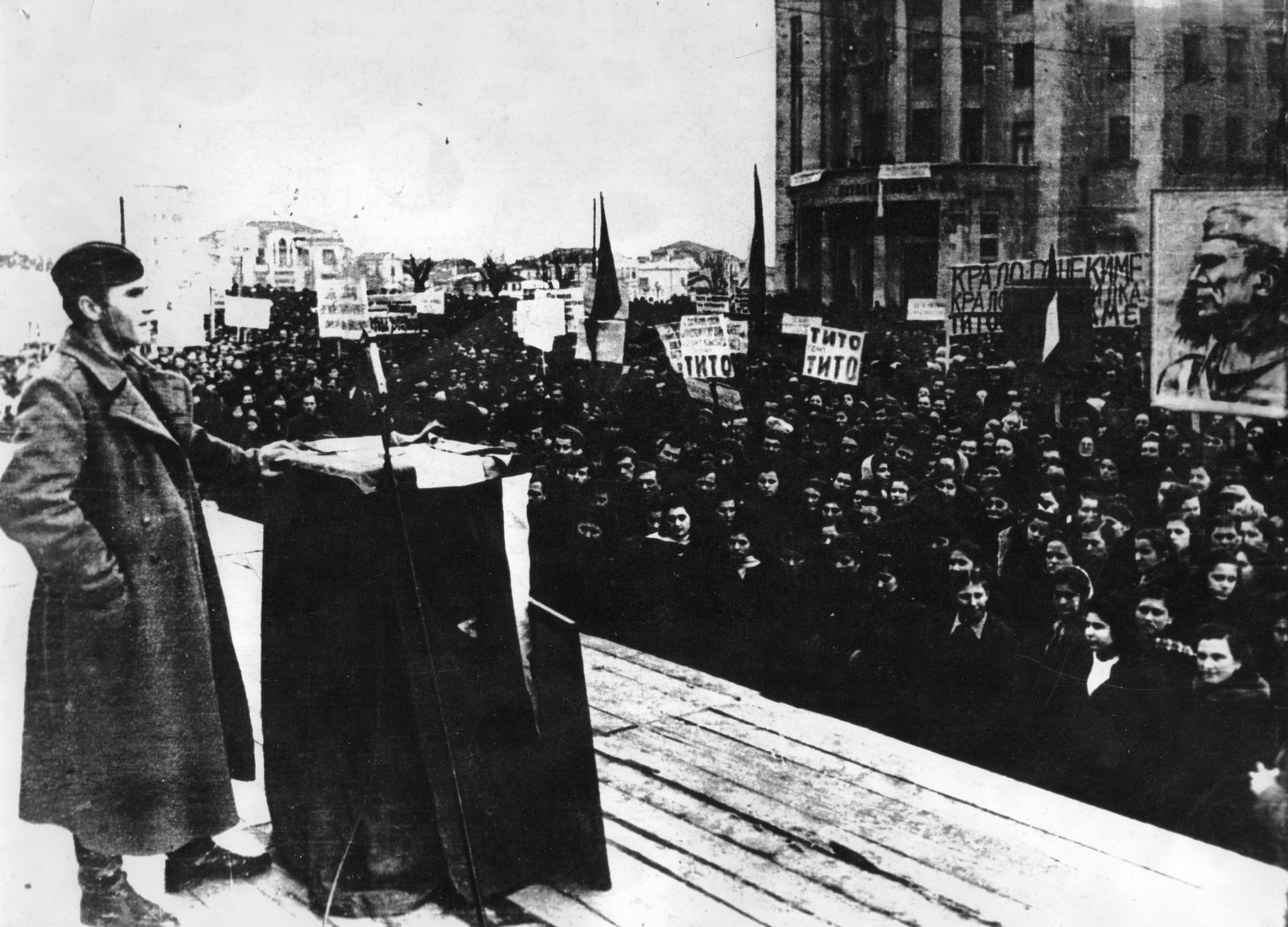
Koliševski giving a speech in Skopje after the liberation in 1945 during World War II in Yugoslav Macedonia.

In 1943, he was elected in absentia as a delegate of the Anti-Fascist Council for the National Liberation of Yugoslavia, secretary of the Central Committee of the Communist Party of Macedonia (later League of Communists of Macedonia/LCM), and in 1944 as a delegate in the first session of the Anti-Fascist Assembly for the National Liberation of Macedonia (ASNOM). He was released from prison in 9 September 1944 when the Fatherland Front took over in Bulgaria. In the second session of ASNOM, he was elected as the vice president of its presidium. He soon became the president of the Communist Party of Macedonia, a branch of the Communist Party of Yugoslavia. In mid-April 1945, Koliševski became the Prime Minister of the Federal State of Macedonia, a federal unit of the Democratic Federal Yugoslavia (DFY). Koliševski was awarded with the Order of the People's Hero, Order of People's Liberation and Order of the Hero of Socialist Labour.

== Yugoslavia ==
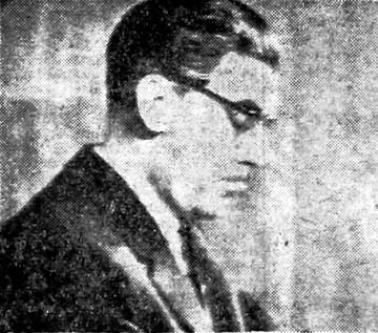
Koliševski in 1964.

In mid-September 1944, Yugoslav leader Josip Broz Tito sent Svetozar Vukmanović and him to Sofia to meet with the Central Committee of the Bulgarian Communist Party to discuss the Macedonian Question. They blamed the Bulgarian communists for their actions during the war in Macedonia and demanded a union of Pirin Macedonia with the new Yugoslav Macedonia. On 16 April 1945, he became the first President of the Executive Council of the People's Republic of Macedonia. Under his leadership, people with Bulgarian sympathies were purged. Thousands of others, who retained their pro-Bulgarian sympathies, suffered severe repression in this period. After Metodija Andonov-Čento's incarceration in November 1946, he also initiated the purging of real or alleged Čentovites and Cominformists from the party and government. During his leadership, LCM was also committed to Yugoslav centralism. The communist Macedonian leaders were declared atheists but they still saw the importance of religion and church in the construction of a nation. During efforts by the Yugoslav Macedonian government to keep Serbs out of the administration, Koliševski stated that it was not necessary for Serbs to be in the civil services as there were enough Macedonians, while also claiming that Serbian officials were corrupt and incompetent, and that they would be incapable of running the administration due to their inability to use the Macedonian language, which was necessary for official communication.

In 1946, he was a member of the Presidency of the Constitutional Assembly. He became a candidate member of the Politburo of the LCY in 1948 at the Fifth Party Congress. He was elected a member of the LCY CC's Executive Committee and a member of the presidency at the Sixth and Seventh Congresses. In 1953, he became the president of the Assembly of the People's Republic of Macedonia. He set the stage for Macedonia's negationist history and in his 1962 work Aspects of the Macedonian Question (Macedonian: Аспекти на македонското прашање), he minimized Bulgarian influence and maximized Serbian influence on Macedonian history. In the 1960s, he went with Tito to eight North African countries as part of a delegation on a diplomatic mission. From 1979 to 1980, Koliševski served as the vice president of the Presidency of Yugoslavia. On 4 May 1980, Koliševski succeeded Tito after his death and held the office of president of the Presidency for ten days, when the office passed on to his successor as vice president and the former President of the League of Communists of Bosnia and Herzegovina Cvijetin Mijatović.

== Republic of Macedonia ==
After the breakup of Yugoslavia, Koliševski lived in Skopje, the capital of the newly-proclaimed Republic of Macedonia, and opposed what he regarded as the anti-Serbian, anti-Macedonian and pro-Bulgarian policy of the VMRO-DPMNE-led government, in the late 1990s. Nationalists in Ohrid demanded that he be hanged. He died on 6 July 2000. Shortly after, his personal archive of 300,000 documents was given to the Macedonian Academy of Arts and Sciences. In 2002, a monument of Koliševski was erected in his birthplace by the left-wing local government. Krste Crvenkovski and Slavko Milosavlevski challenged the belief that he had a significant role in the communist resistance during World War II.

== See also ==
- Titoism
- Socialist Federal Republic of Yugoslavia

Political offices
Preceded by Josip Broz Tito^{as President of SFR Yugoslavia}	President of the Presidency of SFR Yugoslavia; 1980	Succeeded by Cvijetin Mijatović
Preceded by Dimce Stojanov	President of the People's Assembly of PR Macedonia; 1953–1962	Succeeded by Ljupčo Arsov
Preceded by New office	President of the Executive Council of PR Macedonia; 1945–1953	Succeeded by Ljupčo Arsov
Party political offices
Preceded by New office	Secretary of the Central Committee of the League of Communists of Macedonia; 1943–1963	Succeeded by Krste Crvenkovski
