= Regional Committee of Communists in Macedonia =

Provincial communist organization in Vardar Macedonia from 1939 to 1943

The Regional Committee of Communists in Macedonia was the provincial communist organization in Vardar Macedonia from 1939 to 1943.

== History ==
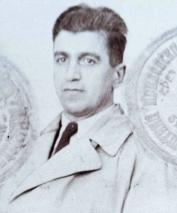
Shatorov was the leader of Macedonian communists in 1941. He was killed under unknown circumstances in September 1944. There are indications he was eliminated by Tito's order as a politically inconvenient leader.

At the beginning of 1939, the Central Committee of the Communist Party of Yugoslavia decided that Vardar Macedonia should form a regional committee. Svetozar Vukmanović was sent to Skopje in August of that year, and the local committee was organised under his leadership on 8 September. The Serb Blagoje Orlandić, was chosen as secretary.

After organising a large demonstration in Skopje in December, Orlandić was arrested and sentenced to one year in prison. In February 1940, a new regional-committee leadership was elected at a meeting; Metodi Shatorov - Sharlo was elected secretary. In November 1940 the regional committee recognized separately from the CC of CPY a distinct Macedonian national identity, but continued also using the term "Macedonian" in its supra-national meaning. In June, a national regional-committee program was drawn up. A September 8, 1940 conference was held near Skopje, at which a political resolution was drafted and new leadership was elected. Under Shatorov's leadership, the Macedonian regional committee followed Communist International (Comintern) policy and maintained close ties with Georgi Dimitrov.

After the Bulgarian takeover of Vardarska Banovina in April 1941, the Macedonian communists fell into the Communist Party of Bulgaria's sphere of influence under Sharlo's leadership. When the directive to organise an armed resistance movement in all regions of occupied Yugoslavia was issued, Sharlo disobeyed the order. He told the Central Committee of the Communist Party of Yugoslavia (CPY) that the situation in Macedonia did not permit immediate military action; propaganda should precede the formation of military units. Sharlo called for the incorporation of the local Macedonian Communist organisations into the Bulgarian Communist Party (BCP). The BCP supported the idea of an independent and unified Macedonia, contrary to the stance of CPY. The Macedonian regional committee refused to remain in contact with the CPY, and joined the BCP. Sharlo refused to distribute a CPY proclamation calling for military action against Bulgarians. With this act, the committee recognized Bulgaria's acquisition of Vardar Macedonia.

Because of the conflict within the Macedonian CPY regional committee, there was no resistance movement in Vardar Macedonia. The Comintern supported a policy of non-intervention at the beginning of World War II, arguing that the war was an imperialist conflict between national ruling classes. When the Soviet Union was attacked by Nazi Germany, however, the Comintern issued a directive ordering the formation of communist resistance movements in all European fascist-occupied territories and the Macedonian Regional Committee (RC) began organizing resistance. The RC (headed by Shatorov) immediately ordered the formation of partisan units – the first of which was formed in the Skopje region on 22 August 1941 – and attacked Bulgarian guards on 8 September in Bogomila, near Skopje. With the help of the Comintern and Joseph Stalin, the Macedonian Communists were attached to the CPY. Soon after this, Shatorov lost his popularity in the CPY and was discredited, because of his stance in favour of a Soviet Macedonia and his anti-Serbian views. Consequently, he moved to Sofia, where he began working as one of the Bulgarian resistance movement leaders.

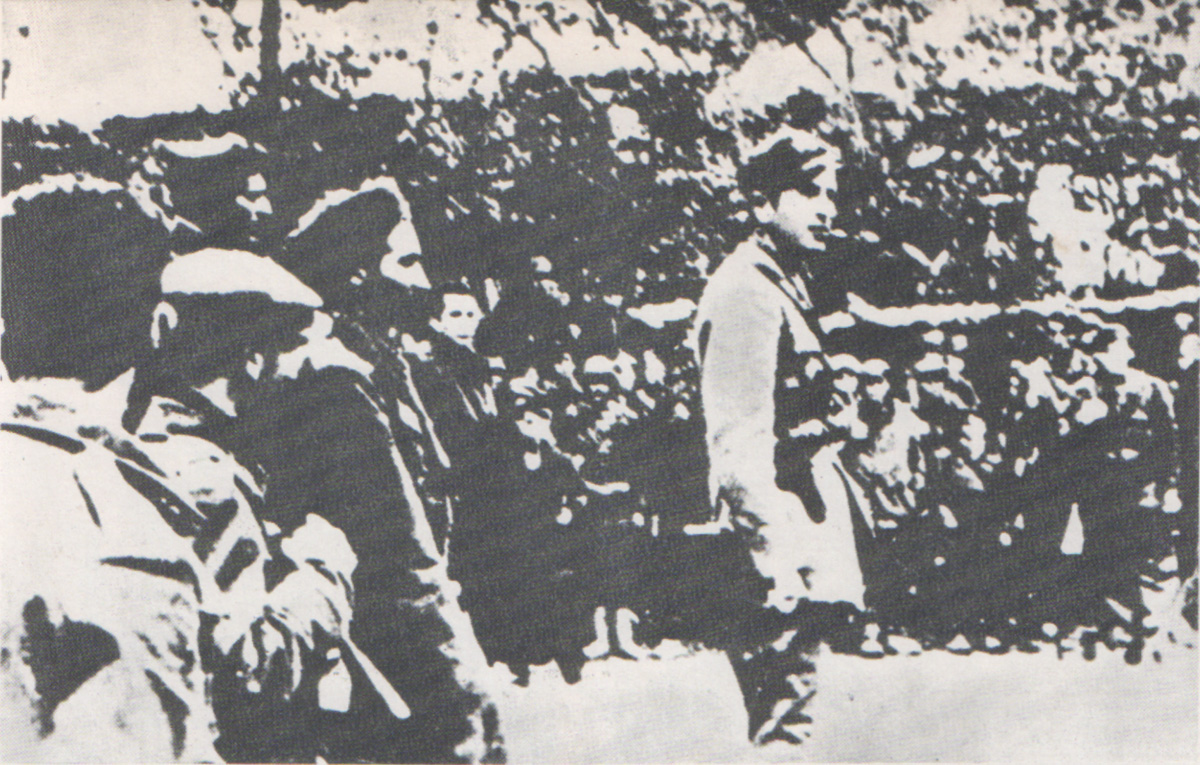
Svetozar Vukmanović welcomes Macedonian and Greek Partisans in 1943 in occupied Greek Macedonia. Under his leadership, the pro-Bulgarian Regional committee was disbanded and pro-Yugoslav Macedonian Communist Party was founded.

CPY loyalists were next appointed as leaders of the RC, with Lazar Koliševski as secretary; in September 1941, Koliševski was sent to Skopje. The new leadership began forming partisan detachments. Armed insurgents from the Prilep partisan detachment "Goce Delčev" attacked Axis-occupied zones in Prilep, including a Bulgarian police station, on 11 October. This date is considered the symbolic beginning of the Macedonian resistance. In November, Koliševski was arrested and sentenced to death by a Bulgarian military court. He wrote two appeals for clemency (to the Bulgarian tsar and the defence minister), insisting on his Bulgarian origin. Koliševski's sentence was commuted to life imprisonment and he was imprisoned in Pleven, Bulgaria. The Prilep detachment was active until December, when it split into three groups: the first in Skopje, the second in Tikveš, and the third in Bitola.

Sharlo's leadership was terminated, but elements of his policy were preserved by some of the local communist activists. The struggle between pro-Bulgarian and pro-Yugoslav Macedonians continued. After the arrest of Lazar Koliševski, the new executive body of the Macedonian RC continued to share Shatorov's ideas and re-established contact with the BCP. The Macedonian RC believed that Macedonian people preferred a unified independent Macedonia rather than becoming part of Yugoslavia again as the CPY had in mind. According to the Encyclopedia of Yugoslavia, Bane Andreev of Veles, Macedonia's new party secretary, thought that the Macedonian people believed in Bulgaria's role as a liberator and no Macedonian wanted to fight Bulgarian soldiers; Macedonians should answer the Bulgarian mobilisation call and join the Bulgarian army. Bane Andreev was arrested by Bulgarian police in the spring of 1942.

Although several uprisings arose in 1942 which led to temporary liberation of some areas, most Macedonian communists were not yet lured to Yugoslavia. Between 1941 and 1943, Tito sent five emissaries to Macedonia to persuade his poorly-disciplined comrades; their efforts had limited success, however, and the Regional Committee was under the de facto control of the BCP. At the end of February 1943, after the German defeat at the Battle of Stalingrad, the Montenegrin Serb Svetozar Vukmanović ("Tempo") was sent as an assistant to Macedonian partisan headquarters to change that. One of his main achievements was that the wartime BCP influence receded into the background of pro-Yugoslavism. He capitalised on the increasing resentment towards the Bulgarian regime as result of the oppressive Bulgarianisation and centralisation policy. Such ideas started to grow with the Soviet victories over Nazi Germany in the beginning of 1943 and the following capitulation of Italy in the Summer, which turned the tide in the war.

Yugoslav communists proclaimed in 1943 as their aim the unification of Macedonia's three regions (Yugoslav, Greek and Bulgarian), within Yugoslavia as extension of its prewar territory, attracting Macedonian nationalists. Tempo began to organise armed resistance to Bulgarian rule in earnest. Under Yugoslav pressure, the Regional Committee was dissolved and replaced by the Communist Party of Macedonia (KPM, part of the Yugoslav Communist Party). Formed on 19 March 1943 in the Albanian occupation zone in Tetovo, its first central committee was composed primarily of pro-Yugoslav communists. Yugoslav communists recognized a separate Macedonian nationality to stop the fears of the local population that they would continue the former Yugoslav policy of forced Serbianization. They didn't support the view that the Macedonian Slavs are Bulgarians, because that meant in practice, the area should remain part of the Bulgarian state after the war.

== Leadership ==
1. Blažo Orlandić (September 1939 – March 1940)
2. Metodi Shatorov (March 1940 – August 1941)
3. Lazar Koliševski (September 1941 – November 1941)
4. Bane Andreev (November 1941 – May 1942)
5. Cvetko Uzunovski (June–September 1942)
6. Kuzman Josifovski Pitu (September 1942 – March 1943)

== See also ==
- World War II in Yugoslav Macedonia
