= Metodi Shatorov =

Bulgarian communist leader (1897–1944)

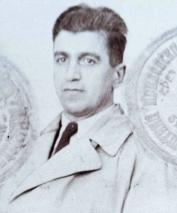
Metodi Shatorov (1939) official document

Metodi Tasev Shatorov (Bulgarian: Методи Тасев Шаторов; Macedonian: Методиja Тасев Шаторов, romanized: Metodija Tasev Šatorov, known also under the pseudonyms Sharlo/Šarlo and Panayot; January 10, 1897 – September 1944) was a Bulgarian Communist Party activist. Shatorov was one of the founders of the Internal Macedonian Revolutionary Organization (United) - IMRO (United) in 1925. He was leader of the Regional Committee of Communists in Macedonia in 1940–1941. Shatorov died under unknown circumstances. He has been celebrated in Bulgaria after the Second World War. However, his name was a taboo in Yugoslav Macedonia. His image was gradually rehabilitated after the country gained independence in the 1990s.

== Biography ==
=== Early years ===
Shatorov was born on January 10, 1897, in Prilep, then in the Manastir vilayet of the Ottoman Empire. He graduated from the local Bulgarian Exarchate's junior school in Prilep and afterwards from the Bulgarian men's high school in Bitola. He also attended the Bulgarian pedagogic school in Skopje in 1914–1915. In 1918 the Bulgarian Army withdrew from Vardar Macedonia and Serbia annexed the area. He immediately emigrated to Bulgaria, settling in Sofia, where he became a member of the Bulgarian Communist Party (BCP) in 1920. Furthermore, Shatorov was arrested for his participation in the communist September Uprising in 1923. In 1925, he was a founder of the IMRO (United), under the practical control of BCP. He became a member of BCP's Central Committee in 1927. Due to his imprisonment in 1928–1929 by the Bulgarian government, he emigrated to the Soviet Union, where he became a functionary of the Comintern.

In 1937, he moved to Paris, where he sent communist volunteers to the Spanish Civil War. Shatorov returned to Vardar Macedonia (being then part of the Kingdom of Yugoslavia under the name Vardar Banovina) in 1939 and became the secretary of the Macedonian Regional Committee of the Communist Party of Yugoslavia (CPY). On October 1, 1940, at CPY's Fifth Land Conference, taking place in Zagreb, he rejected the conference theses put forward by Milovan Djilas. Djilas' theses spoke of a popular front, restricting it to the workers and peasants. However, referring to the colonial character of Macedonia, Shatorov wanted a communist-led national revolutionary front of all Macedonian classes and groups, which had to fight against "Serbian imperialists and oppressors." Shatorov also stated that the party should support the expulsion of Serb settlers from Macedonia in order to win the trust of the Macedonians. He also accused Djilas of having a Serb chauvinist stance because of his use of historical analogies to defend the settlers. His regional committee recognized a distinct Macedonian national identity as early as 1940, while also using the term "Macedonian" in the supra-national manner.

=== During WWII ===
During World War II, after the Bulgarian takeover of Vardar Macedonia in April 1941, the local communists fell in the sphere of influence of the BCP under his leadership. The Macedonian Regional Committee refused to remain in contact with the CPY and linked up with BCP as soon as the invasion of Yugoslavia started. Shatorov also renamed the committee as "Regional Committee of the Workers' Party in Macedonia" and expelled its two ethnic Serbian members. The BCP supported the idea of an independent and unified Macedonia, contrary to the stance of the CPY. Shatorov refused to distribute the proclamation of the CPY which called for military action against the Bulgarians. He became prominent with his anti-Serbian political views and adopted a stance in favor of a Soviet Macedonia and of waiting for the Red Army, thus got into a conflict with the CPY. His anti-Yugoslav and pro-Bulgarian actions made CPY's leadership to send two of its commissioners, Mara Naceva and Lazar Koliševski, to Macedonia. The Yugoslavs referred to him as "the Old Bulgarian". As a Bulgarophile, Shatorov was reluctant to resist against the Bulgarians, arguing that the conditions were not sufficient, as most Macedonians then were not willing to fight due to their resentment against the old Yugoslavia. For Shatorov, the "occupiers" were the Serbs, not the Bulgarians. BCP also was of the view that the locals were not ready to fight for the same reason.

In May 1941, Shatorov issued an open letter (known as the "Letter to Stojan") in which he tracked the continuity of the fight for national and political liberation of the Macedonians to the Ottoman-era IMRO, personified in its leaders like Gotse Delchev, Gyorche Petrov and Yane Sandanski, and condemned the Bulgarian regime for presenting the Macedonian culture as Bulgarian. However, he understood the concept of "Macedonians" in the old supra-national manner, as he included Bulgarians, Albanians and Aromanians in the terminology. In a letter to the BCP's CC, he also expressed his view that the debates over the extent the Macedonians were distinct from the Bulgarians had to be ended. Shatorov also criticized what he referred to as "Greater Macedonian chauvinism" of the activists who condemned all those who did not regard themselves as "Macedonian Slavs." He urged for a fight against the Bulgarian imperialism, while he accepted the occupation of Macedonia as a done deal as a solution of the national issues for the Macedonian and Bulgarian population. The secretary of BCP's CC, Traycho Kostov, replied to him that the Macedonians were not enthusiastic about the Bulgarian occupation and that over 80 percent of the locals regarded themselves as Macedonians. The Yugoslavs appealed to the Comintern and it approved the Yugoslav view, but only after Germany's attack on the Soviet Union, as there was a benefit for more forces on the Soviet side. Thus, the Comintern decided that Macedonia should be part of Yugoslavia for practical reasons, the two parties should support the self-determination of the Macedonians, and the Macedonian regional committee was to remain part of the CPY. The Comintern also decided that the BCP had made the mistake of trying to dominate the Macedonian communists and that resistance had to begin there as soon as possible under the CPY. Shatorov had been expelled from the CPY and sentenced to death. Shatorov returned to Bulgaria. In Bulgaria, he began working as one of the resistance movement leaders (under the nickname 'Panayot'). He was an organizer of the defense of the Jews in Sofia. Shatorov played an active role in organizing terrorist attacks, such as the assassination of general Hristo Lukov. In the spring of 1943, he became a partisan in the "Panayot Volov" detachment. Shatorov was appointed commander of the Pazardzhik Insurgent Operational Zone of the so-called People's Liberation Insurgent Army (NOVA).

To avoid the risk of a continuation of pro-Bulgarian policies, Yugoslav leader Josip Broz Tito tasked the special envoy Montenegrin Serb Svetozar Vukmanović-Tempo with organizing a Macedonian communist party in CPY's framework. CPY also managed to organize the Macedonian partisan movement as a national liberation struggle. Tempo sharply criticized Shatorov's pro-Bulgarian policy.

=== Death and legacy ===
Shatorov was heavily wounded and died under unknown circumstances after September 5, 1944, when a battle between partisans and gendarmerie on Milevi Skali in the Western Rhodope mountains, between Septemvri and Velingrad occurred. As Shatorov was previously subjected to sharp criticism from the CPY, there are allegations that he was killed by Yugoslav communists' order as a politically inconvenient leader. This happened only several days before the Communist coup d'état of September 9 (backed by the Red Army) installed a new government of the Fatherland Front. As per the autopsy report, he died after September 9, i.e. after the old regime's end, and until then he was not discovered neither by his comrades nor by the new authorities.

In the People's Republic of Bulgaria, he was considered a hero of the anti-fascist resistance, but after 1990, Shatorov's activities have been criticized, as those of all Bulgarian Communist Party figures. The Yugoslav Macedonian historiography thought that he was trying to Bulgarianize the Macedonian communist movement. His name was a taboo then. In the 1990s, during efforts to rehabilitate him, veterans of the National Liberation Struggle condemned the pro-Bulgarian character of both him and his followers. However, in November 2005, a scholarly conference of the Macedonian Academy of Sciences and Arts rehabilitated him and decided that he was "a great Macedonian patriot who felt Macedonian, fought for Macedonian national identity, and was not a traitor of the Macedonian cause." Shatorov is celebrated as a Bulgarian patriot in Bulgaria.

== Gallery ==
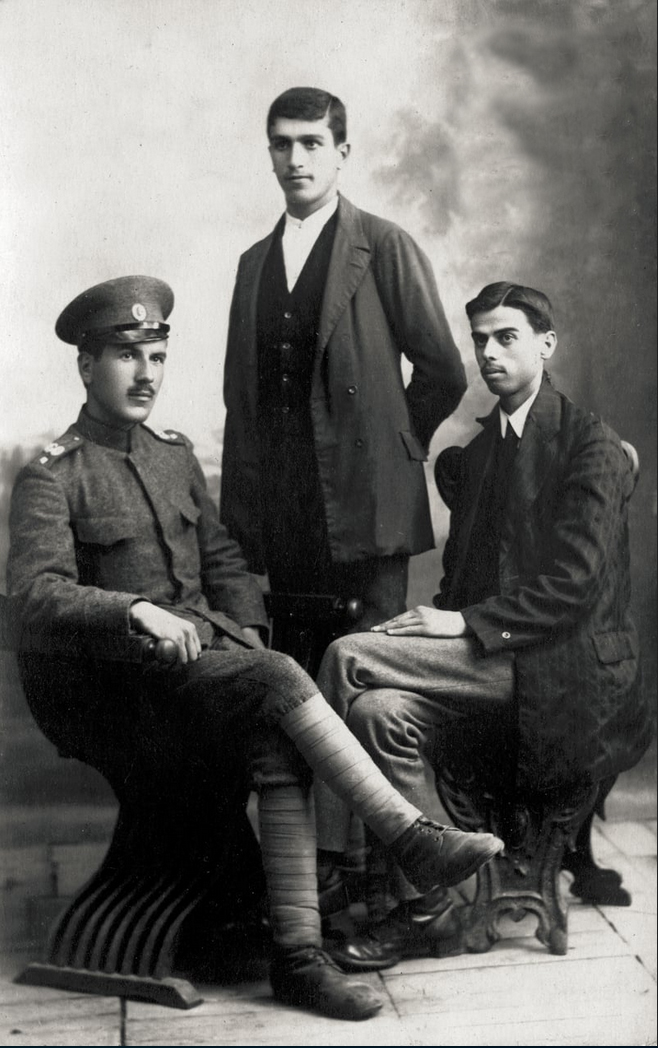
Shatorov as Bulgarian soldier

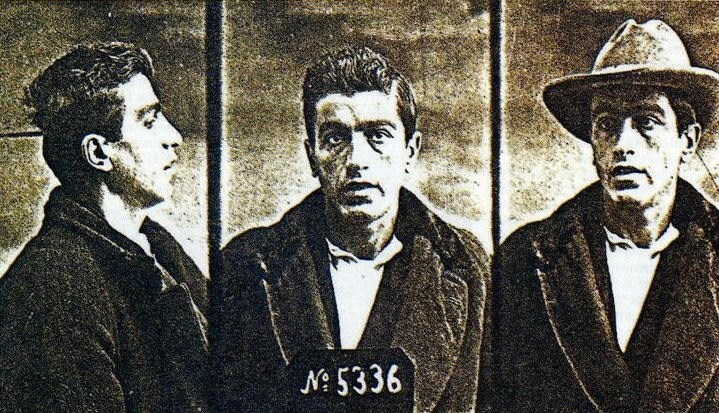
Excerpt from Shatorov's Bulgarian police file

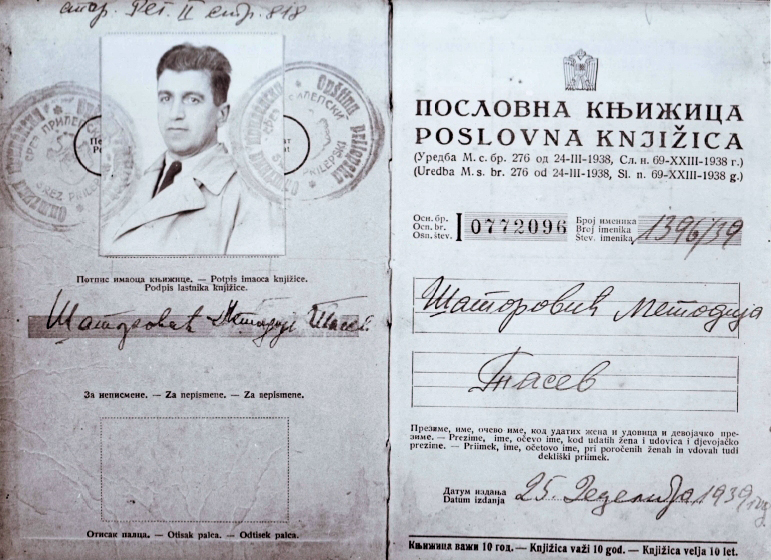
Shatorov's Yugoslav paper

Photo of Shatorov

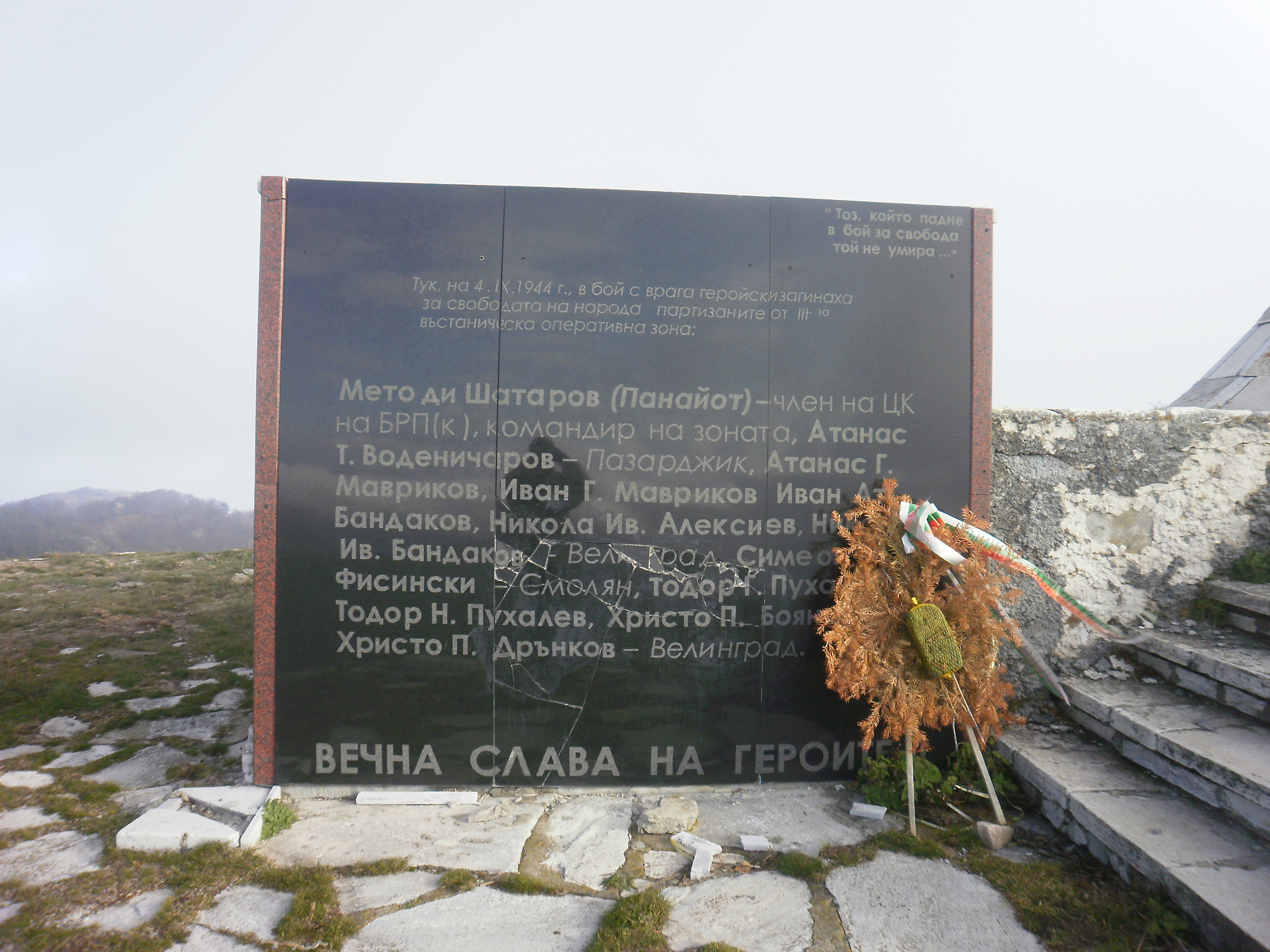
Memorial plaque for the 12 fallen partisans on Milevi Skali

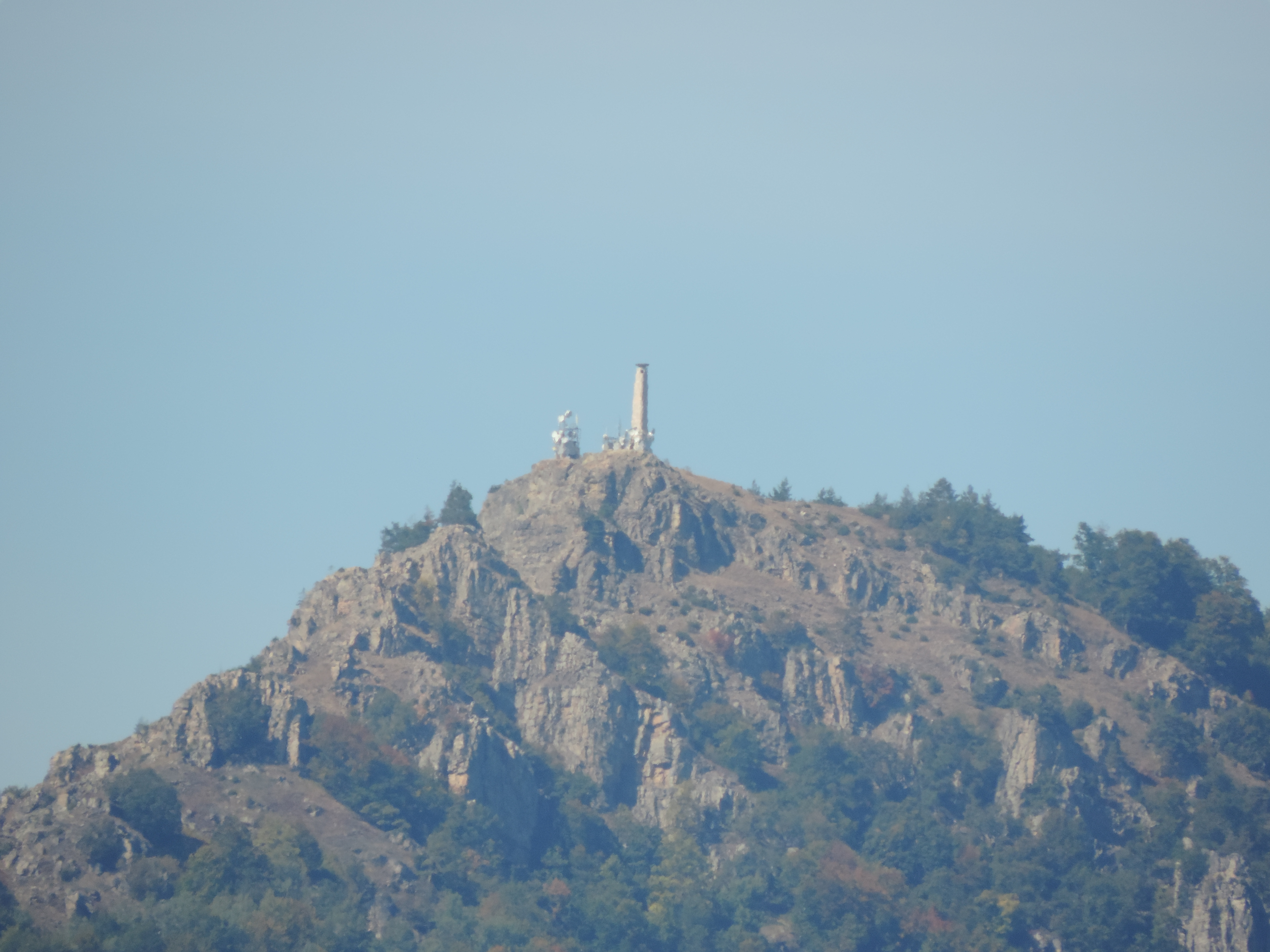
View of Milevi Skali peak, with a monument to the partisans who fell there

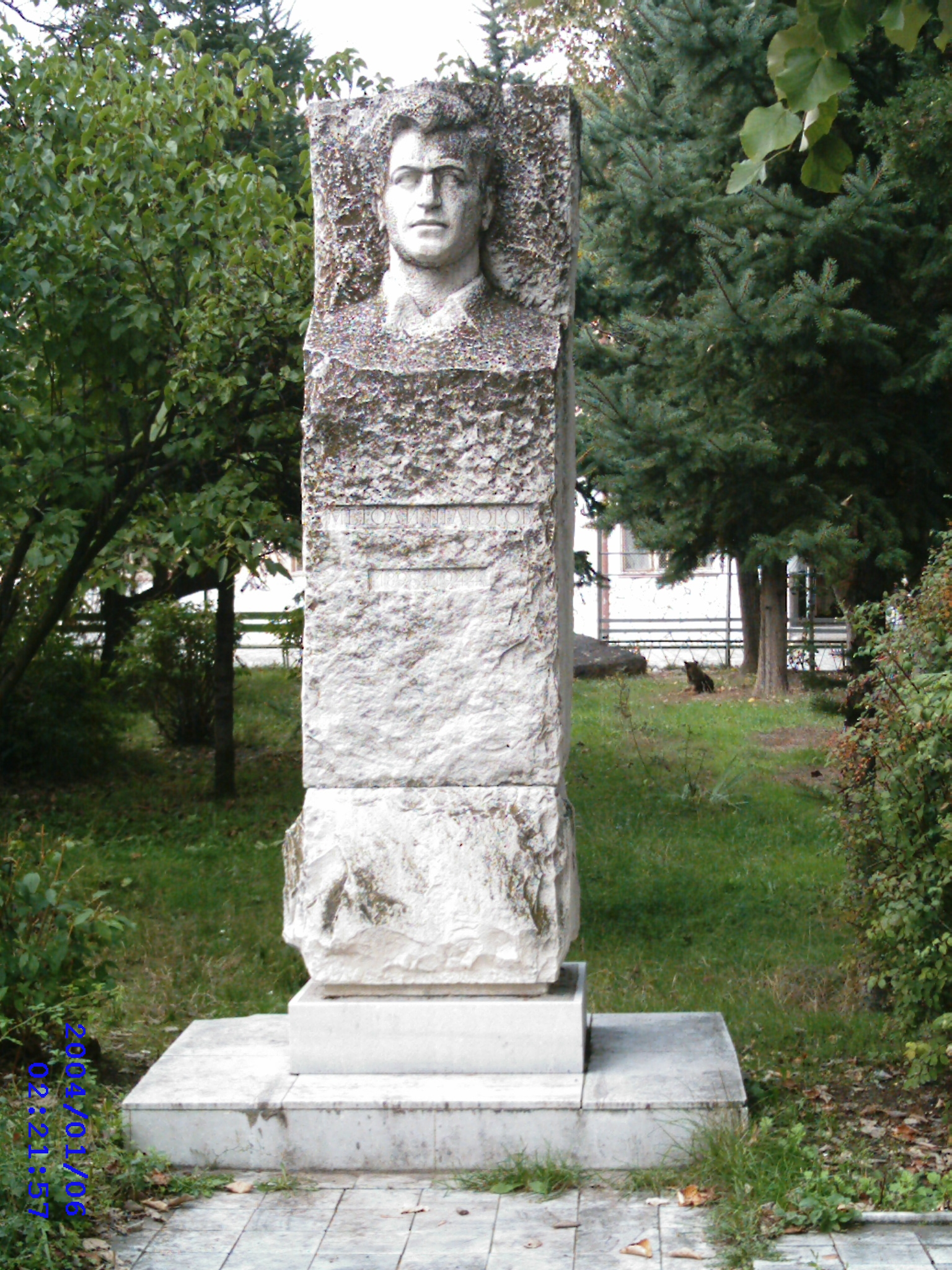
Monument of Metodi Shatorov in Bratsigovo, Bulgaria

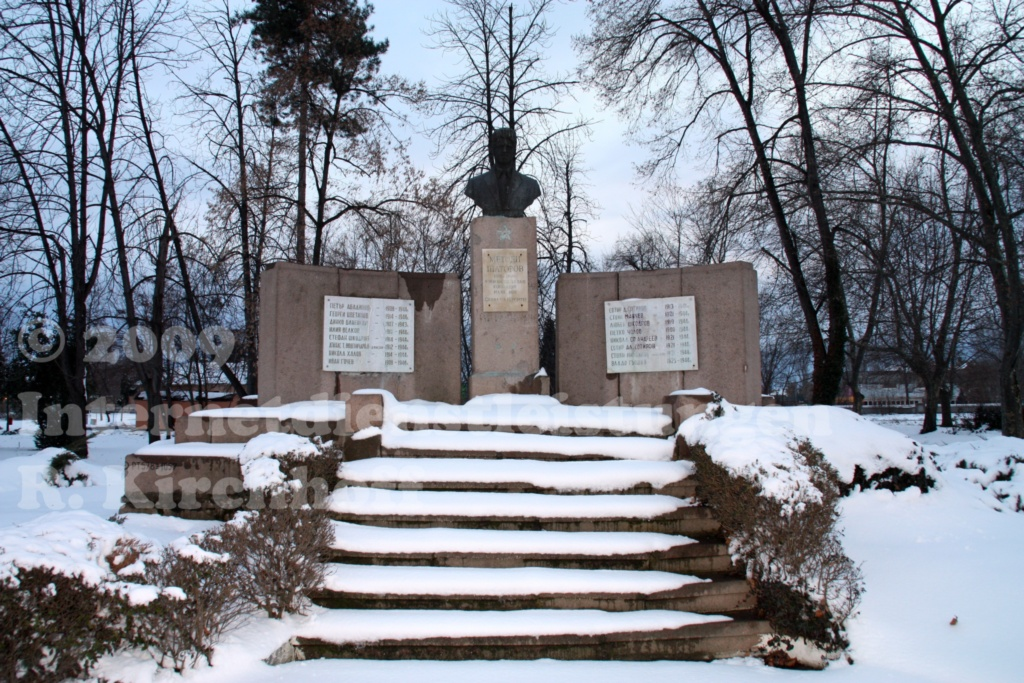
Monument of Metodi Shatorov in Pazardzhik, Bulgaria

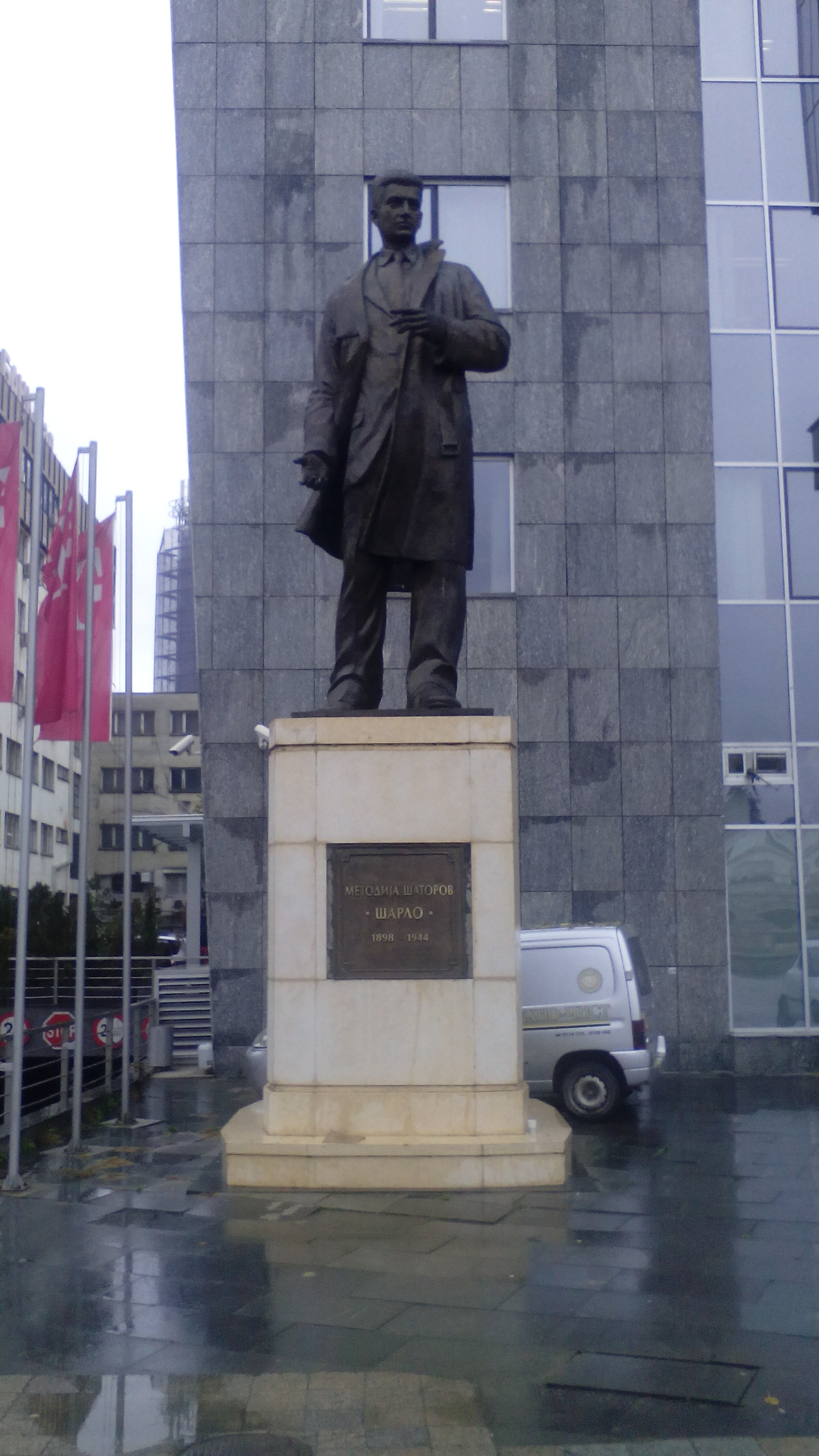
Monument of Shatorov in the Macedonian capital city Skopje
