= Yugoslav irredentism =

Political movement to merge Slav regions

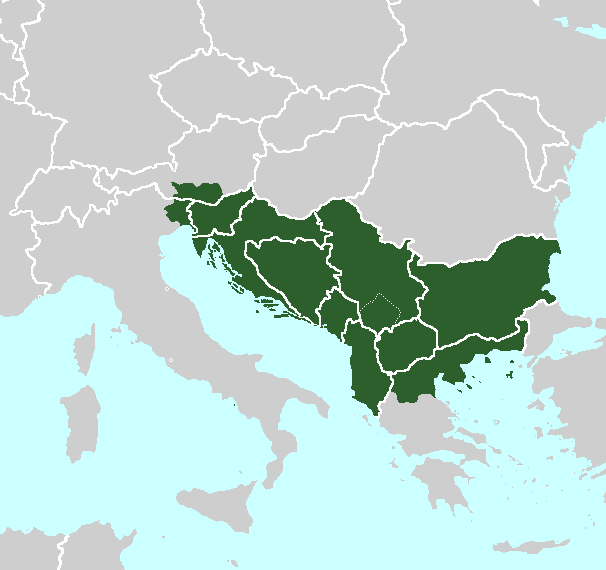
Greater or Integral Yugoslavia

Yugoslav irredentism was a Yugoslavist political idea advocating for merging of South Slav-populated territories within Yugoslavia with several adjacent territories, including Bulgaria, Western Thrace and Greek Macedonia. The government of the Kingdom of Yugoslavia sought the union with Bulgaria or its incorporation into Yugoslavia. The government of the communist-ruled Yugoslavia under Josip Broz Tito negotiated for an eventual unification with the People's Republic of Bulgaria in the Bled agreement, and also sought to create an integral Yugoslavia that would incorporate within its borders: Greek Macedonia, Albania, Pirin Macedonia, at least some of Austrian Carinthia, and for a time the entire Italian region of Friuli-Venezia Giulia.

== History ==
Proponents of Yugoslav irredentism included both monarchists and republicans. Days prior to Yugoslavia's creation in 1918, Yugoslavist politician Svetozar Pribićević declared that Yugoslavia's borders should extend "from the Soča up to Salonika". Proposals in the interwar period to include Bulgaria within Yugoslavia, included claims by republicans that a republic was necessary for an Integral Yugoslavia with Bulgaria, while others claimed that a republic would not because Bulgaria at that time was a tsardom, and instead claimed that a limited constitutional monarchy would be an appropriate form of state that could include Bulgaria within it. The militant movement Zveno in Bulgaria supported an Integral Yugoslavia that included Bulgaria as well as Albania within it. The Zveno movement participated in the Bulgarian coup d'état of 1934, the coup supporters declared their intention to immediately form an alliance with France and to seek the unification of Bulgaria into an Integral Yugoslavia.

Once World War II began, in 1940 General Milan Nedić proposed that Yugoslavia join the Axis powers and attack Greece to seize Salonika. During World War II, the British government supported the creation of a Greater Yugoslavia after the war due to opposition to the Bulgarian government's accession to the Axis Powers, in May 1941 endorsing Dr. Malcom Burr's paper in favour of the incorporation of Bulgaria into Yugoslavia after the war.

In June 1945, Josip Broz Tito declared that Yugoslavia had the right to have Trieste and all of Carinthia, including Austrian Carinthia, saying "We have liberated Carinthia but international conditions were such that we had to leave it temporarily. Carinthia is ours and we shall fight for it". Neither the Soviet Union nor the Western Allies supported Yugoslav claims against Austria and Italy. Yugoslavia abandoned such claims after the 1948 Tito–Stalin split.

In 1947, Tito and Georgi Dimitrov planned for the eventual annexation of Bulgaria into the Socialist Federal Republic of Yugoslavia, in the Bled agreement, however such arrangements never came to fruition after the Tito-Stalin split, due to Bulgaria siding with the Soviet Union.

== See also ==
- 1920 Carinthia Plebiscite
- Banat Republic
- Banat, Bačka and Baranja
- Republic of Prekmurje

== Sources ==
- Ramet, Sabrina P. (2006). The three Yugoslavias: state-building and legitimation, 1918-2005. Bloomington, Indiana, USA: Indiana University Press.
