= Vidoe Smilevski =

Macedonian politician and partisan (1915–1979)

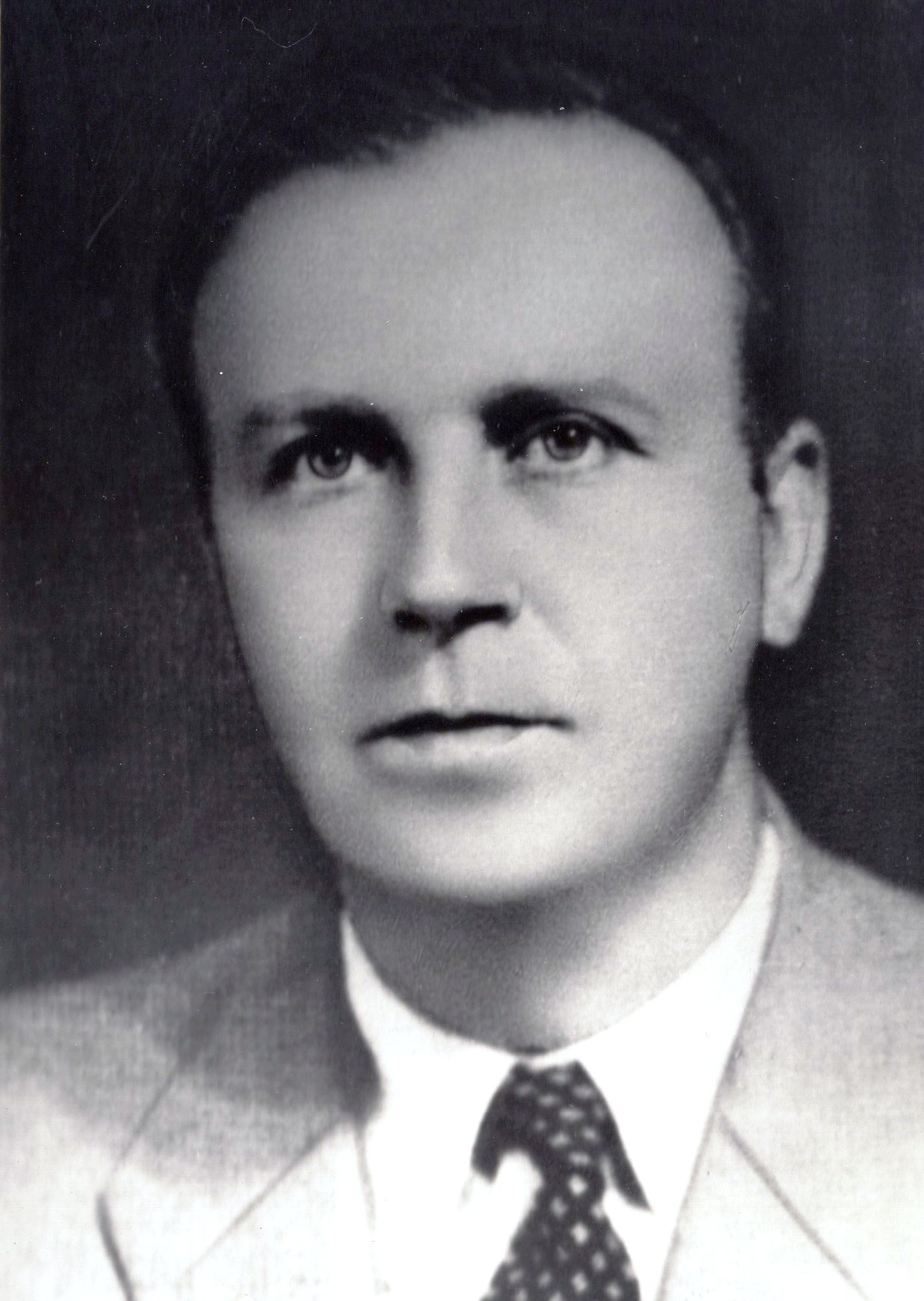

President of the Presidency of the Socialist Republic of Macedonia
- In office 6 May 1974 – 8 September 1979
- Preceded by: Nikola Minčev (as President of the People's Assembly)
- Succeeded by: Ljupčo Arsov

President of the People's Assembly of the Socialist Republic of Macedonia
- In office 25 June 1963 – 12 May 1967
- Preceded by: Ljupčo Arsov
- Succeeded by: Mito Hadživasilev

President of the Presidency of the People's Assembly of the People's Republic of Macedonia
- In office 1950–1951
- Preceded by: Blagoja Fotev
- Succeeded by: Dimče Stojanov (as President of the People's Assembly)

Personal details
- Born: 14 August 1915 Nikiforovo, Gostivar, Kingdom of Serbia
- Died: 8 September 1979 (aged 64)
- Party: League of Communists
- Profession: Politician

Vidoe Smilevski-Bato (Macedonian: Видое Смилевски-Бато; 14 August 1915 – 8 September 1979) was a Macedonian politician and partisan leader who served three times as the President of Macedonia, each time under a different title. He first led the country as President of the Presidency of the People's Assembly from 1950 to 1951, then as President of the People's Assembly from 1963 to 1967, and finally as President of the Presidency from 1974 until his death in 1979.

== Early life ==
Smilevski was born on 14 August 1915 in Nikiforovo, Gostivar, Kingdom of Serbia. After World War I, his family moved to Belgrade, where he began working at a young age to help his family buy bread and to allow himself to attend school. As a youth, he wrote poetry and played football; he remained an avid football fan throughout his life. He attended primary school and secondary school in Belgrade and was a graduate of the Trade Academy. While being educated, Smilevski developed an interest in politics and possessed several books describing Marxism. He frequently studied Karl Marx's The Communist Manifesto and joined the communist movement in the early 1930s, when it was illegal in Yugoslavia.

== Career ==
After receiving his education, Smilevski worked as a clerk for the State Mortgage Bank. During this time, he organized a trade union and "his apartment turned into the center of illegal revolutionary activity". He started serving as a political informant and lecturer by 1939 and from that year until 1940, he let the local communist party run their technical department in his apartment. Smilevski eventually became head of the department, and in April 1940, he officially joined the Communist Party of Yugoslavia. Smilevski served on the party's district committee in Belgrade and was an activist illegally operating in Belgrade and Zemun. In his operations, he used the false names of Dragoslav Šimunović and Stevan Vuletić to avoid capture.

Smilevski began working for the communist underground in February 1941. He then spent 1941 until 1944 serving as a commander for the Yugoslav Partisans during World War II, resisting the Axis occupation of the country. Starting in January 1943, he served as secretary of the municipal committee of the communist party in Leskovac District. Communist newspaper Borba stated that his "values, abilities and experience ... were of invaluable importance" during the war. Smilevski was transferred to serve as secretary of the district committee in Vranje in February 1944, then was given the same post for the Pirot district in April 1944, after which he was an instructor in the provincial committee.

In July 1944, Smilevski moved to Macedonia to serve in the Anti-fascist Assembly for the National Liberation of Macedonia (ASNOM) and shortly after that was elected to the Central Committee of the Communist Party of Macedonia, while also serving as the secretary of the fourth regional committee of the party. He became the party's regional secretary for the Skopje in Macedonia in October 1944, and at the end of the war, he held the role of instructor of the Central Committee of the Communist Party of Serbia and inspector in the Presidency of the Government of the People's Republic of Serbia.

Following the war, Smilevski remained in Macedonia, where he became a member of the politburo of the country's communist Central Committee and was a leading figure in the new Socialist Republic of Macedonia. He served on the Central Committee in its first, second, third, fourth, sixth and seventh congresses and was the Macedonian communist party's organizational secretary. He served as the Macedonian Vice President from 1947 to 1950. He became head of state in 1950 as President of the Presidency of the National Assembly, a role he held for a year before serving as vice president again from 1952 to 1954. In addition to serving in the Macedonian National Assembly, Smilevski was also a deputy in the Federal Assembly of Yugoslavia. He later was elected President of the People's Assembly of SR Macedonia and served from 25 June 1963 to 12 May 1967 in the position. After this, he served as President of the Federal Chamber of the Assembly of Yugoslavia. He was also a member of the Federation Council and was president of the board of directors of the Republic Fund for the Crediting of the Economic Development of Underdeveloped Regions.

Smilevski served on the Central Committee of the League of Communists of Yugoslavia in the fifth, sixth, seventh and eighth congresses, while also being a member of the Presidency of the 8th Congress of the League of Communists of Yugoslavia until 1969. He also led several organizations composed of Yugoslav World War II veterans and frequently wrote newspaper articles on politics and economic affairs in the country. In May 1974, Smilevski became President of the Presidency of SR Macedonia, his third stint as head of state. In his last years, he also was a member of the Presidency of the Central Committee of the Macedonian Communist Party.

== Death and honors ==
On 8 September 1979, Smilevski suffered a heart attack and then died of cardiac arrest, at the age of 64. A national day of mourning was declared in Macedonia following his death, and Yugoslav President Josip Broz Tito released a statement describing Smilevski as having contributed in "building our socialist self-governing system and strengthening our community of equal peoples and nationalities. In his revolutionary activity ... [he] always distinguished himself with consistency, with principle and self-sacrifice in the accomplishment of the most responsible tasks entrusted to him by our Party and the socialist community. His death is an irreparable loss". A school in Macedonia was named after him, called the Secondary School Textile Center "Vidoe Smilevski Bato" (Средњошколски текстилни центар „Видое Смилевски Бато'). He was a recipient of the Order of the Hero of Socialist Labour and the Order of the People's Hero, in addition to several other honors.
