= President of the Federal Chamber of the Assembly of Yugoslavia =

The president of the Federal Chamber was the presiding officer of the lower house of the Federal Assembly of Yugoslavia throughout the existence of the Federal People's Republic of Yugoslavia.

Below is a list of office-holders from 1963:

Name	Period	Republic/Province	Party
Vladimir Simić	1946 –1953		SKJ
Vlada Zečević		Serbia	SKJ
Mijalko Todorović	1963 – October 1966	Serbia	SKJ
Miloš Minić	October 1966 – December ? 1967	Serbia	SKJ
Vidoe Smilevski	1967 – ?	Macedonia	SKJ
Danilo Kekić	1976 – 1976	Vojvodina	SKJ
Dobroslav Ćulafić	1978–1979	Montenegro	SKJ
Stana Tomašević	1979–1982	Montenegro	SKJ
Anton Vratuša	1982–1983	Slovenia	SKJ
Aslan Fazlija	1983–1984	SAP Kosovo	SKJ
Stojan Bjelajac	1984–1985	Bosnia and Herzegovina	SKJ
Miodrag Trifunović	1985–1986	Serbia	SKJ
Milka Grigorijević-Takeva	1986–1987	SR Macedonia	SKJ
Omer Kurpejović	1987–1988	SR Montenegro	SKJ
Stjepan Novaković	1988–1989	Croatia	SKJ
Bogdana Glumac-Levakov	1989–1992	Serbia	SKJ/SPS

== Vice-presidents ==
Name	Period	Republic/Province
Vilmos Molnar	1986–1987	SAP Vojvodina

== Sources ==
- Various editions of The Europa World Year Book
