= Law for the Protection of Macedonian National Honour =

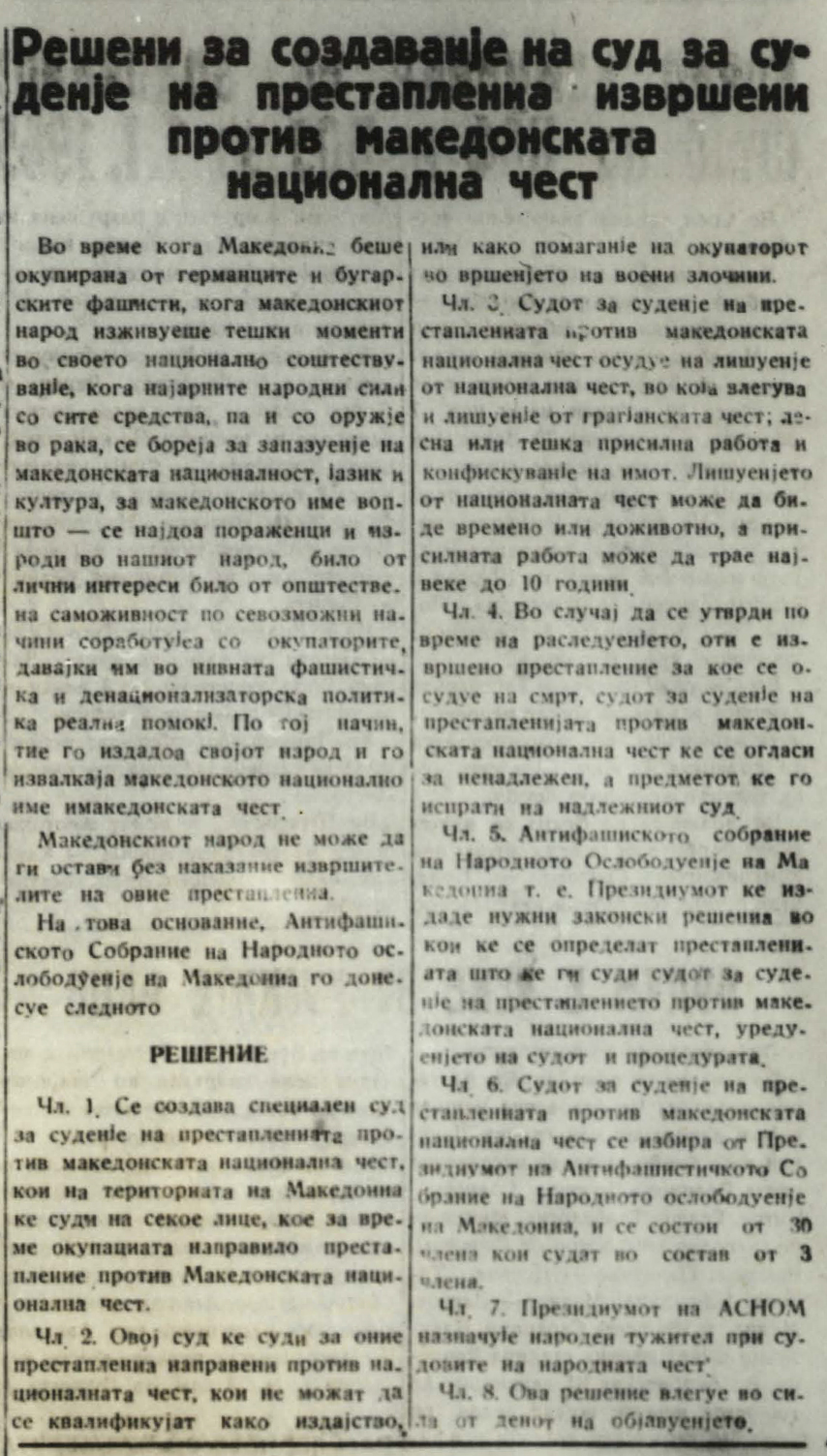
Statute of the Court, published in the Nova Makedonija newspaper, No. 28, from 3 January 1945.

The Law for the Protection of Macedonian National Honour was a statute passed by the government of the Socialist Republic of Macedonia (SR Macedonia) at the end of 1944. At its second session held from 28 to 31 December 1944, the Presidium of the Anti-Fascist Assembly for the National Liberation of Macedonia (ASNOM) established a special court to implement this law. The court officially came into effect on 3 January 1945, and was officially abolished on 1 July 1945.

Although some researchers believe that the law continued to be in force until 1991, it is much more likely that it was abolished in February 1948.

== History ==
=== Background ===
During the World War II, Bulgaria annexed the Yugoslav province called Vardar Banovina, encompassing most of modern North Macedonia. Pro-Bulgarian sentiments prevailed among the locals and the Bulgarians were greeted by most of them as liberators from Serbian rule. However, soon after the occupation, the authorities realized that only part of the Slavic Macedonians felt Bulgarian or were pro-Bulgarian. Because of that, they initiated a program of intense Bulgarisation in Macedonia. Some researchers described this process as "re-Bulgarisation" and "de-Serbianisation". Harsh treatment by occupying Bulgarian troops reduced the pro-Bulgarian orientation of the Macedonian Slavs even more. After Bulgaria sided with the Axis powers, it lost the war and the last Bulgarian troops withdrew from the region in November 1944. At the end of the World War II in Yugoslav Macedonia the Macedonian national feelings were already ripe, although it is not clear to what extend the Macedonian Slavs considered themselves to be different from the Bulgarians. However, the overwhelming majority of the Slavic population in Macedonia accepted the emerging Macedonian national identity without a problem. To wipe out the remaining pro-Bulgarian sentiments, the new Communist authorities took heavy measures. The task was also to break up all the organisations that opposed the idea of Yugoslavia.

=== Implementation and function ===
On 3 January 1945, the newspaper Nova Makedonija published the newly adopted Law on the Trial of Crimes against Macedonian National Honour. The law provided for a number of sanctions: deprivation of civil rights, imprisonment with forced labour, confiscation of property, and in cases where it was deemed that the accused might be sentenced to death, it was envisaged that they would be handed over to a "competent court". The tribunal was established to prosecute "collaborators of the occupiers who had undermined the Macedonian national name and Macedonian national honour." To ensure that not only pro‑Bulgarian sympathizers involved in war crimes could be held accountable, the authorities introduced a new offense: "violation of the Macedonian national honour". A special court was created specifically for this purpose. Per Dejan Djokić to proclaim Bulgarian identity was allowed only after 1944 in the Strumica region. The area is part of the so-called Western Outlands, that were part of Bulgaria until 1919. Though per Georgy Fotev only migrants from the Serbian part of the Western Outlands were allowed to declare themselves to be Bulgarians. The law also applies to territories that have been occupied by Italy and Albania. The law is a precedent in European legal history, as such legislation was not adopted in the People's Republic of Slovenia, which was subjected to forced Italianization and Germanization during the war. The Macedonian Serbs were not trialed on it either, despite some of them were cooperating with the Axis Forces. A special court was created between April and August 1945 to implement the law.

=== Impact ===
The act allowed the sentencing of Yugoslav citizens from SR Macedonia for collaboration with the occupational authorities during WWII, for pro-Bulgarian leanings and for agitating against Macedonia's position in Yugoslavia. Some victims tried as collaborators with the Bulgarian authorities were Spiro Kitinchev, Dimitar Gyuzelov and Dimitar Chkatrov. The first president of the Anti-Fascist Assembly of the National Liberation of Macedonia, Metodija Andonov-Čento, was sentenced to prison due to agitating against Macedonia's position in Yugoslavia. These were highly publicised show trials, rather than being committed to justice. Despite the fact that the court could not impose death sentences, Bulgarian sources claim that in early 1945, around 100,000 Bulgarophiles were imprisoned and over 1,260 were allegedly killed due to the Law, while some Bulgarian researchers claim 23,000 Bulgarians massacred or disappeared without trace, and about 130,000 persecuted, imprisoned, deported or sent to labor camps. However, other Bulgarian researchers have questioned these figures, noting that the assertion that these individuals were persecuted and killed solely on account of their Bulgarian national consciousness is deceptive. While occasional trials continued throughout the period the law was in force, the bulk of them took place in the late 1940s.

=== Modern period ===
Due to the inconsistent and confusing legal regulation of that law, it is not very clear until when it was in force. Although some researchers believe that it continued to be in force until 1991, when the present North Macedonia gained independence from the former Yugoslavia, according to a legal analysis of Macedonian non-governmental activists, it is much more likely that it was abolished in February 1948. These people who held on to their Bulgarian identity faced strong hostility from both the authorities and the rest of the population. With the fall of Communism the hostility decreased, but still remains.

== See also ==
- Bloody Christmas (1945)
- Macedonian Bulgarians
- Bulgarians in North Macedonia
- Bulgaria–North Macedonia relations
- Law for the Protection of German Blood and German Honour
- Law for Protection of the Nation
- Haralampi Perev
