= ASNOM Memorial Center =

Memorial center in North Macedonia

Coordinates: 42.281691°N 21.857976°E

- АСНОМ Меморијален центар
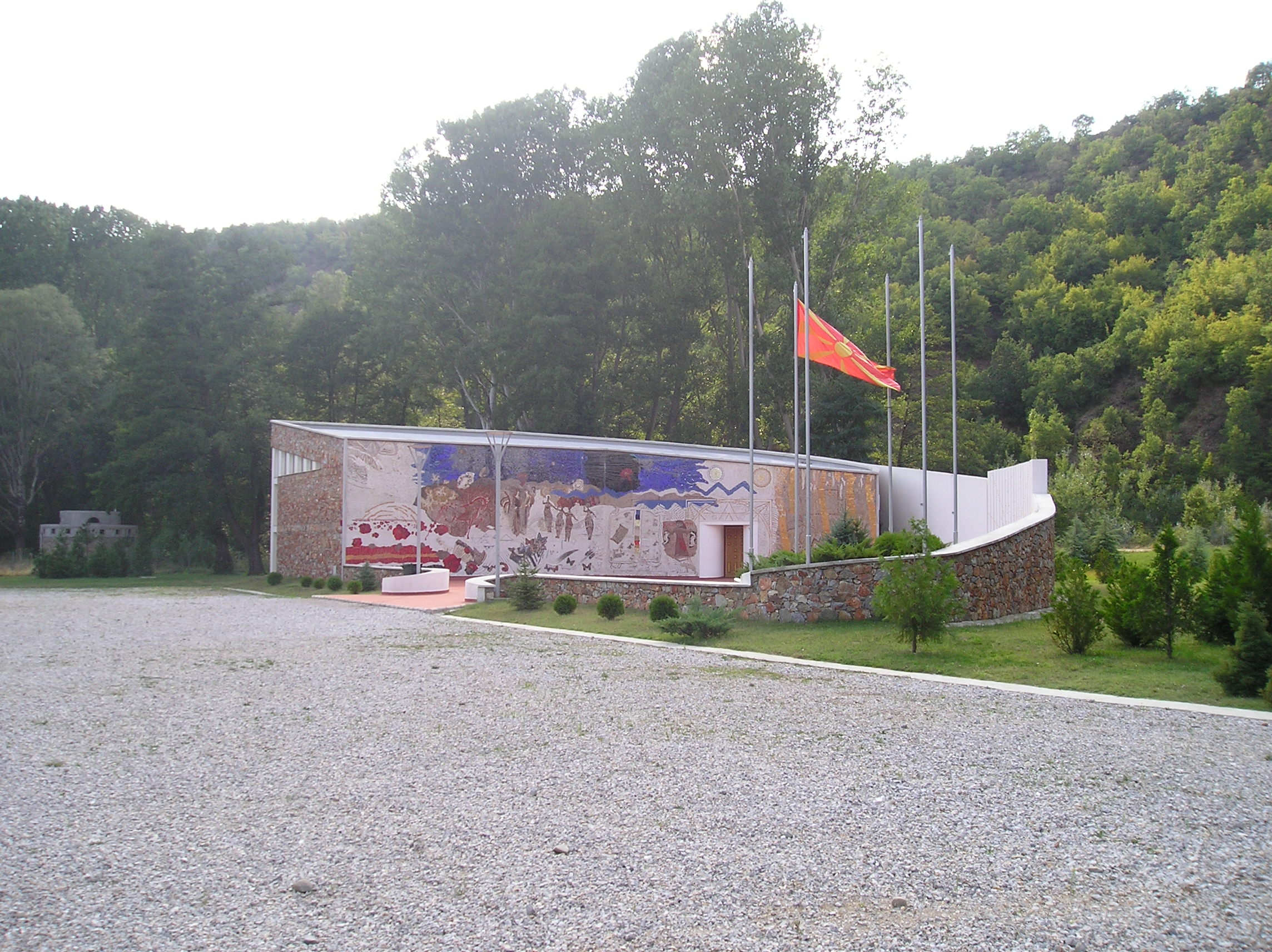
- ASNOM Memorial Center in Pelince
- Interactive map of the ASNOM Memorial Center area

General information
- Location: Pelince, Staro Nagoričane, North Macedonia
- Client: Government of North Macedonia; Ministry of Culture of North Macedonia

Logo of Ministry of Culture of North Macedonia

The ASNOM memorial center is a building located in the village of Pelince, in the northern part of North Macedonia.

It was built in 2004 and contains a replica of the room where the first plenary session of the Anti-Fascist Assembly for the People's Liberation of Macedonia (ASNOM) was held, which is located in the Prohor Pčinjski monastery in neighboring Serbia, two kilometers from the memorial center. The building was designed by Georgi Konstantinovski and the mosaic is a work of Rubens Korubin.

It is therefore a building with great historical importance for the Macedonian citizens and the country. Every year the Day of the Republic is celebrated here by thousands of people and the president or the prime minister of North Macedonia being guests and holding speeches. Next to the building a library, restaurant and a park were constructed.

== Gallery ==
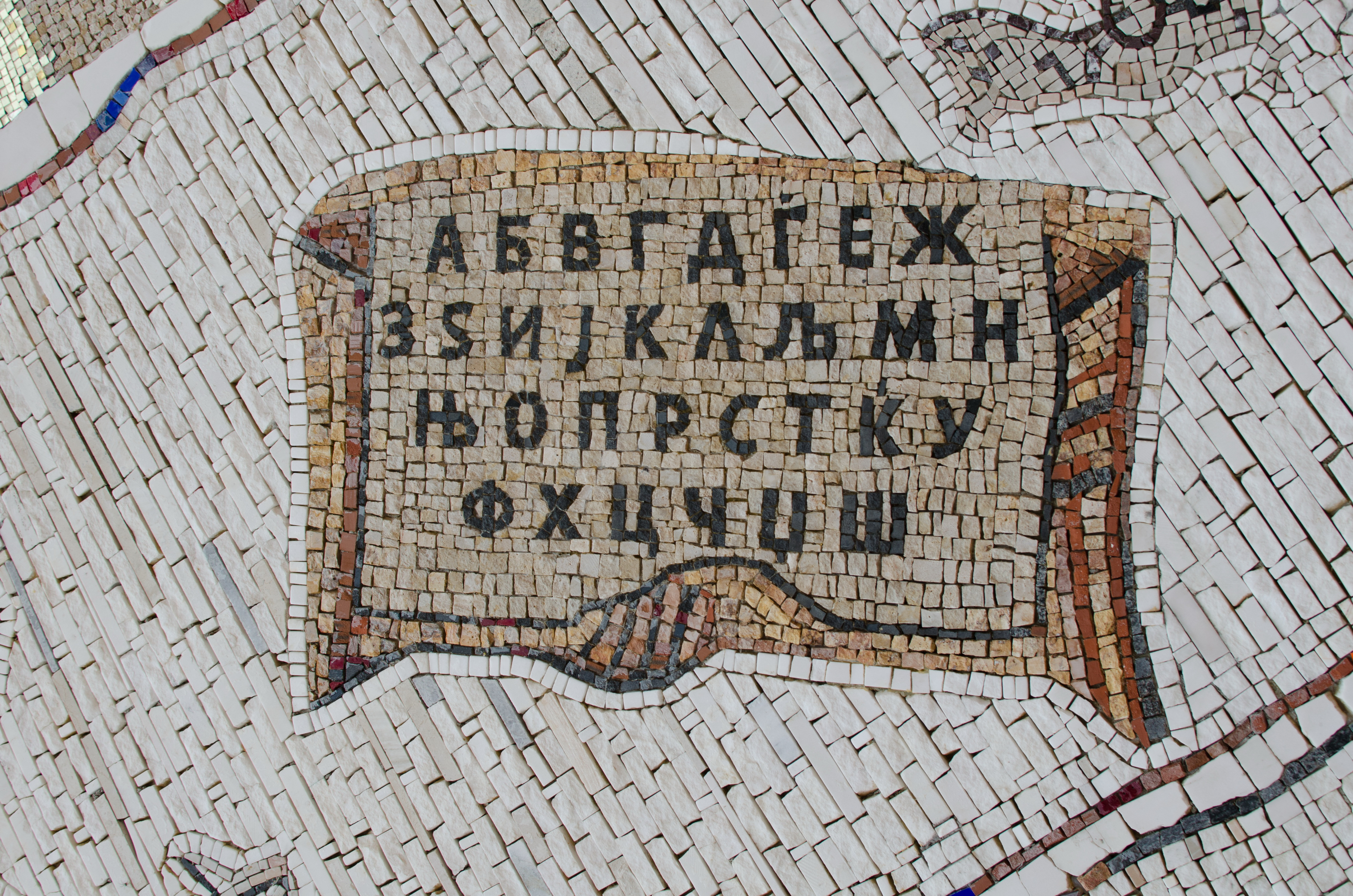
Macedonian alphabet mosaic

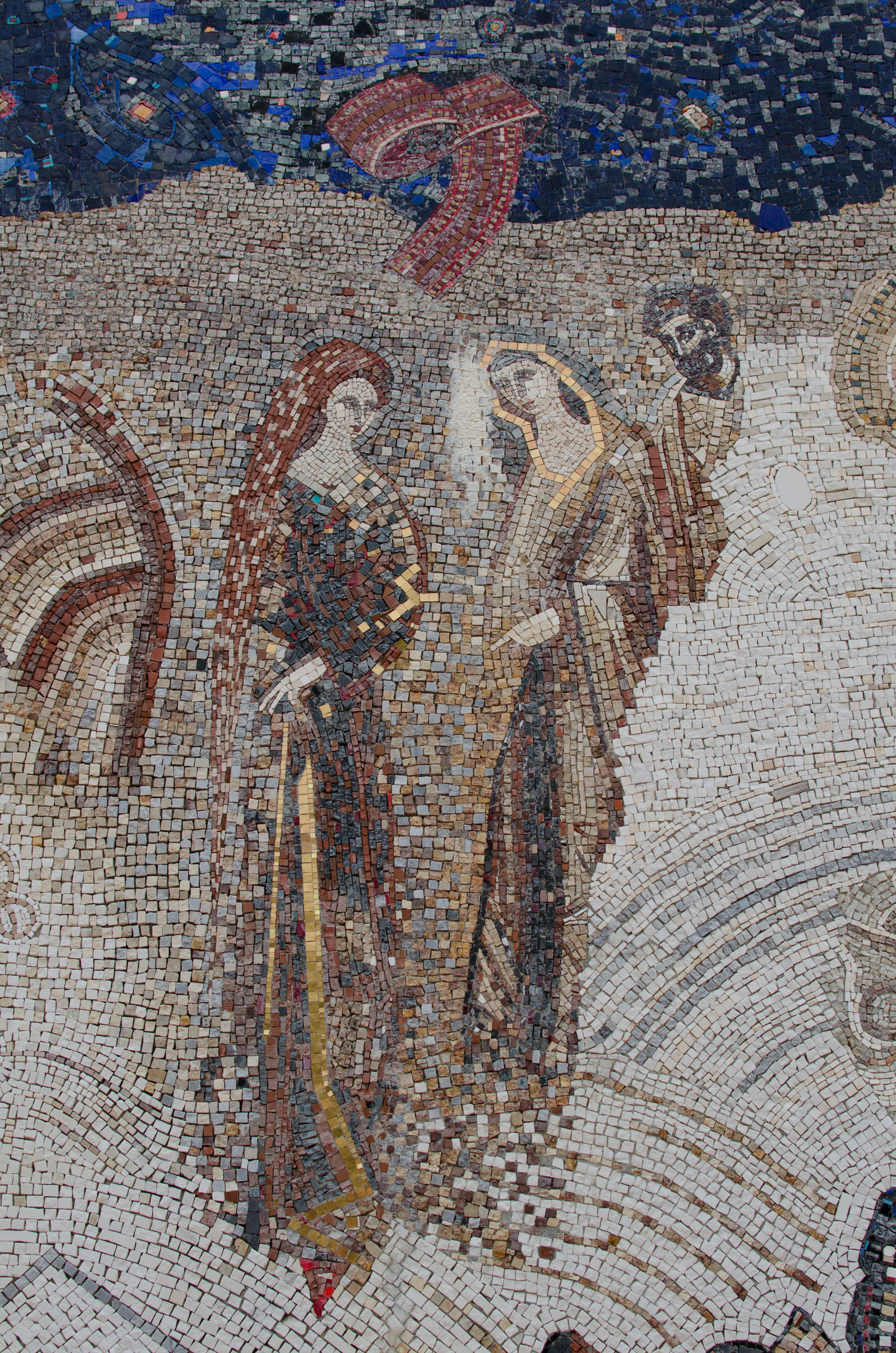
Part of the mosaic

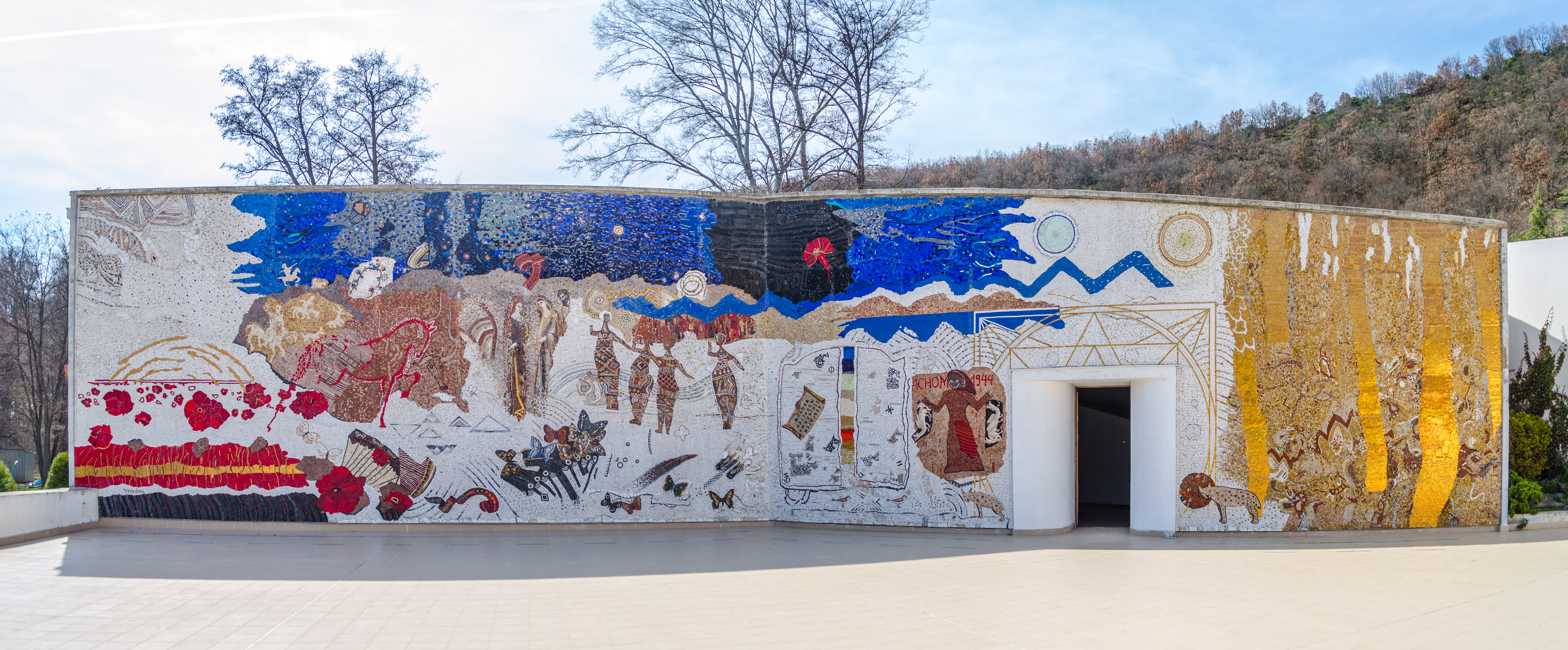
The building up close
