= Bloody Christmas =

Bloody Christmas may refer to:

- Bloody Christmas of Sendling (1705), a massacre in Bavaria, Germany during the Bavarian People's Uprising
- Bloody Christmas (1920), a series of clashes in Rijeka (Fiume)
- Bloody Christmas (1945), a campaign of executions of Bulgarians in the Yugoslav Republic of Macedonia
- Bloody Christmas (1951), an incident of police brutality in Los Angeles
- Bloody Christmas (1963), a series of events initiating the outbreak of the tension between the Greek Cypriots and the Turkish Cypriots
- Bugesera invasion (1963), also known as the "Bloody Christmas" (French: Noël Rouge)
