= Klenike oil shale deposit =

- Location: Klenike, Pčinja District, Serbia
- Products: Oil shale

The Klenike oil shale deposit is an oil shale deposit located in Klenike, Pčinja District, Serbia. The deposit has oil shale reserves amounting to 72 million tonnes, one of the largest oil shale reserves in Serbia and Europe and has an organic content equivalent to 2.4 million tonnes of shale oil.
