= Stana Tomašević =

Yugoslav politician, partisan and diplomat

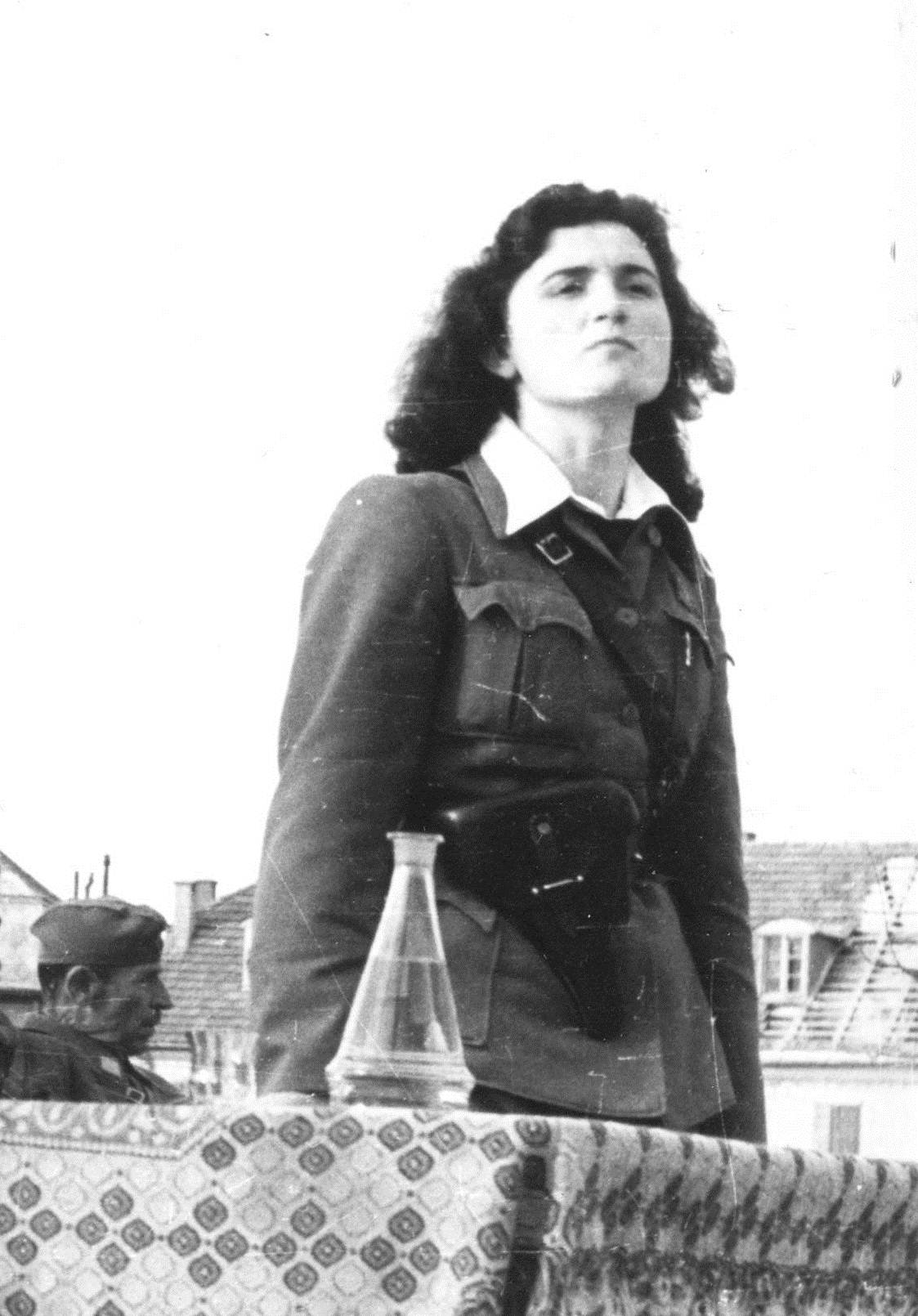
- Tomašević in 1944
- Born: 28 April 1920; Bar, Montenegro
- Died: 1983 (aged 62–63); Belgrade
- Education: University of Belgrade
- Occupations: Yugoslav Partisan, teacher, model, politician and diplomat

Stana Tomašević (married name Stana Tomašević-Arnesen, 28 April 1920 – 1983) was a Yugoslav Partisan officer during World War II, a teacher, model, politician and diplomat. She was Yugoslavia's first woman ambassador, serving as the country's representative in Norway, Iceland and Denmark. She served as president (speaker) of the Federal Chamber from 1979 to 1982.

== Biography ==
Tomašević was born in Bar, Montenegro in 1920, and studied to become a teacher. She was working as a teacher in Vrulja, near Pljevja when the Kingdom of Italy occupied Montenegro in 1941. As an idealistic young patriot, she immediately joined the Partisans and became the first woman commissar in Yugoslavia. She was part of the “Jovan Tomašević” battalion and then in the Fourth Montenegrin Proletarian Brigade. She was wounded twice and ended the war highly decorated with the rank of colonel.

In May 1944, the Germans attempted to capture Josip Broz Tito in the Bosnian town of Drvar and Tomašević's battalion played an important role in defending Tito. While she was in Drvar, the British military photographer John Talbot took pictures of her that were dropped as leaflets over Europe to encourage resistance to the occupiers. The photos became widely known to European resistance fighters. Her brother Duško was killed by Chetniks while fighting in Bosnia.

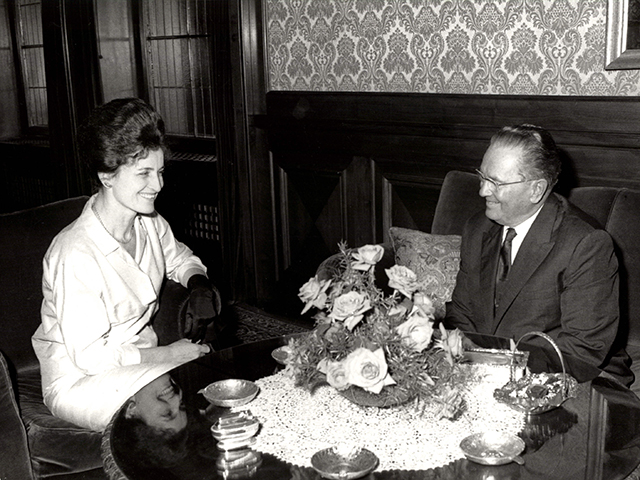
Stana Tomašević with President of Yugoslavia Josip Broz Tito in Belgrade in 1963

After the war, she graduated from the Faculty of Philosophy in Belgrade in 1954, and then served as a federal minister in the Yugoslav government. She was appointed as the country's first woman ambassador, firstly to Norway and Iceland (1963–1967) and later Denmark (1974–1978). She was the third female ambassador accredited to Norway. In Norway, she met and married film-maker Eugen Arnesen, who had first seen her on poster that had been airdropped into Norway. He died in 1969.

After the death of Tito, served as president of the Socialist Alliance of Working People (SSRNJ) Committee for commemorating Tito's legacy.

Tomašević died of cancer in 1983 in Belgrade, shortly after retiring as President of the Federal Chamber of the Yugoslav Parliament, the country's highest-ranking woman at that time.

She was awarded The Commemorative Medal of the Partisans of 1941 and other foreign and Yugoslav decorations, including the Order of Brotherhood and Unity of the First Class.

== See also ==
- Kozarčanka
