= Pelince =

Pelince Пелинце
- Village
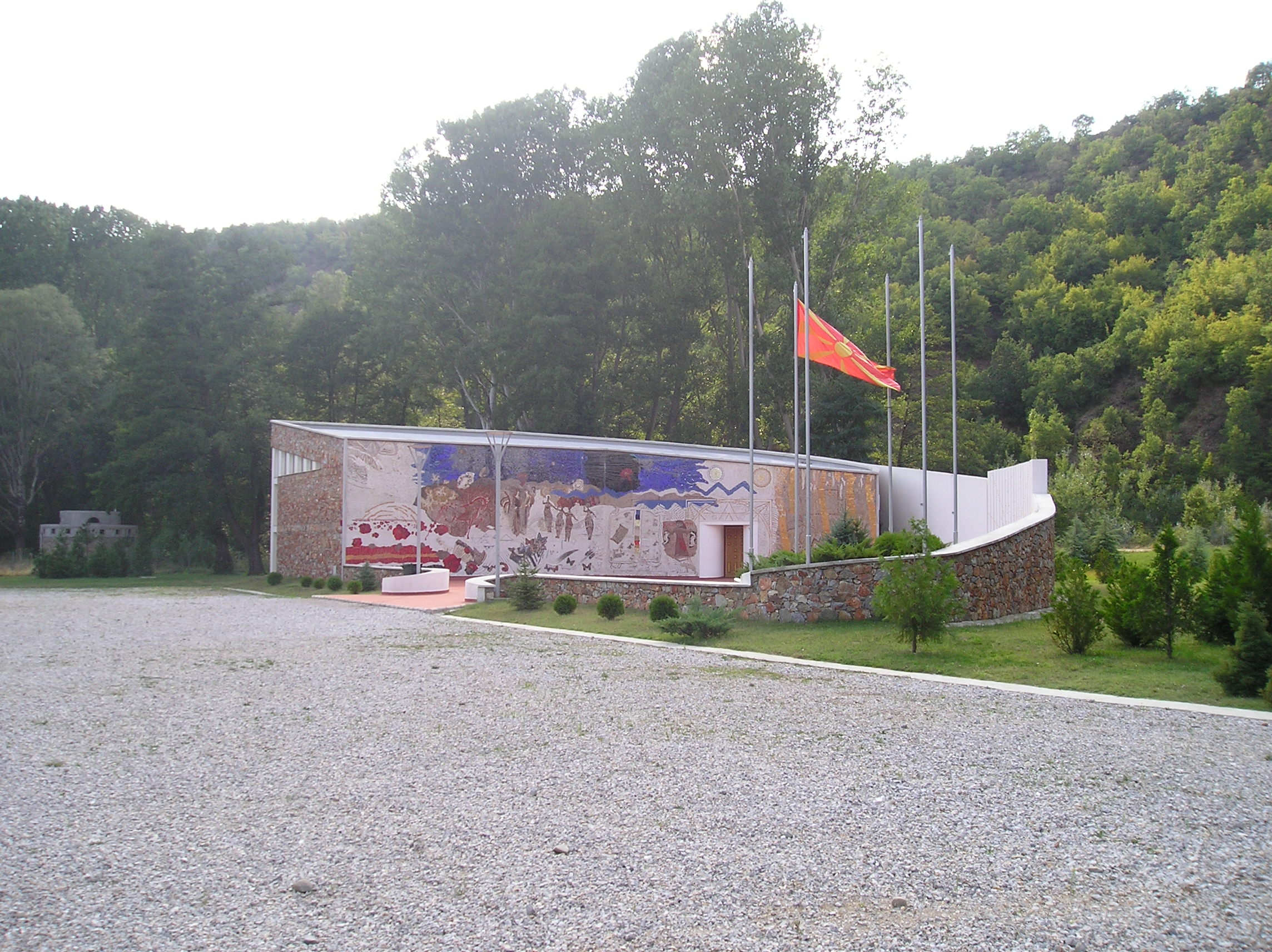
- ASNOM Memorial Center in Pelince

- Location within North Macedonia
- Country: North Macedonia
- Region: Northeastern
- Municipality: Staro Nagoričane

Population (2002)
  - Total: 191
- Time zone: UTC+1 (CET)
  - Summer (DST): UTC+2 (CEST)
- Car plates: KU

Pelince (Macedonian: Пелинце) is a village in the municipality of Staro Nagoričane, North Macedonia.

The village became popular among the citizens of the Republic of Macedonia in 2004 when a new national commemorative of ASNOM was built in the village, where the annual celebration of the Macedonian statehood (The Second Ilinden of 1944) has taken place ever since. This decision was brought due to the continuous refusals by the Serbian Orthodox Church authorities to allow Macedonian delegations to visit and celebrate the holiday in the actual venue of ASNOM, the Prohor Pčinjski monastery which is on Serbian territory near the Macedonian border and near the village of Pelince.

== Demographics ==
According to the 2002 census, the village had a total of 191 inhabitants. Ethnic groups in the village include:

- Macedonians 184
- Serbs 7
