= Socialist Republic of Macedonia =

Federated state of Yugoslavia (1944–1991)

Coordinates: 42°00′N 21°26′E

Socialist Republic of Macedonia (Note: Historical names: 1944–1946: Democratic Federal Macedonia (Macedonian: Демократска Федерална Македонија, romanized: Demokratska Federalna Makedonija); 1946–1963: People's Republic of Macedonia (Macedonian: Народна Република Македонија, romanized: Narodna Republika Makedonija)) (1963–1990) Социјалистичка Република Македонија (Macedonian) Socijalistička Republika Makedonija Republic of Macedonia (1990–1991) Република Македонија (Macedonian) Republika Makedonija
- 1944–1991
- Flag (1946–1992) Emblem
- Anthem: Марш на македонските револуционери Marš na makedonskite revolucioneri "March of the Macedonian Revolutionaries" (1944); Денес над Македонија; Denes nad Makedonija "Today Over Macedonia" (from 1945)
- Macedonia within Yugoslavia
- Status: Constituent republic of Socialist Federal Republic of Yugoslavia
- Capital: Skopje
- Common languages: Macedonian; Serbo-Croatian
- Religion: Secular state (de jure); State atheism (de facto)
- Government: 1946–1990: Unitary communist state 1990–1991: Unitary parliamentary republic
- Leader of the LCM
  - 1944–1963: Lazar Koliševski (first)
  - 1989–1991: Petar Gošev
- Head of state
  - 1944–1946: Metodija Andonov-Čento (first)
  - 1991: Kiro Gligorov (last)
- Head of government
  - 1945–1953: Lazar Koliševski (first)
  - 1986–1991: Gligorije Gogovski (last)
- Historical era: World War II and Cold War
  - ASNOM's first session: 2 August 1944
  - End of World War II: 8 May 1945
  - Breakup of Yugoslavia: 1991
  - Independence referendum: 8 September
  - Independence proclaimed: 25 September 1991
- Currency: Albanian lek (1944); Bulgarian lev (1944–1945); Yugoslav dinar (1945–1991)
| Preceded by | Succeeded by |
| Kingdom of Bulgaria; Albanian Kingdom (1943–44) | Republic of Macedonia |
- Today part of: North Macedonia

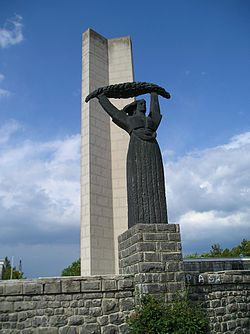
Second World War memorial - Memorial Ossuary Kumanovo. Celebrating the Yugoslav Partisan movement became one of the main components of the post-World War II Macedonian culture.

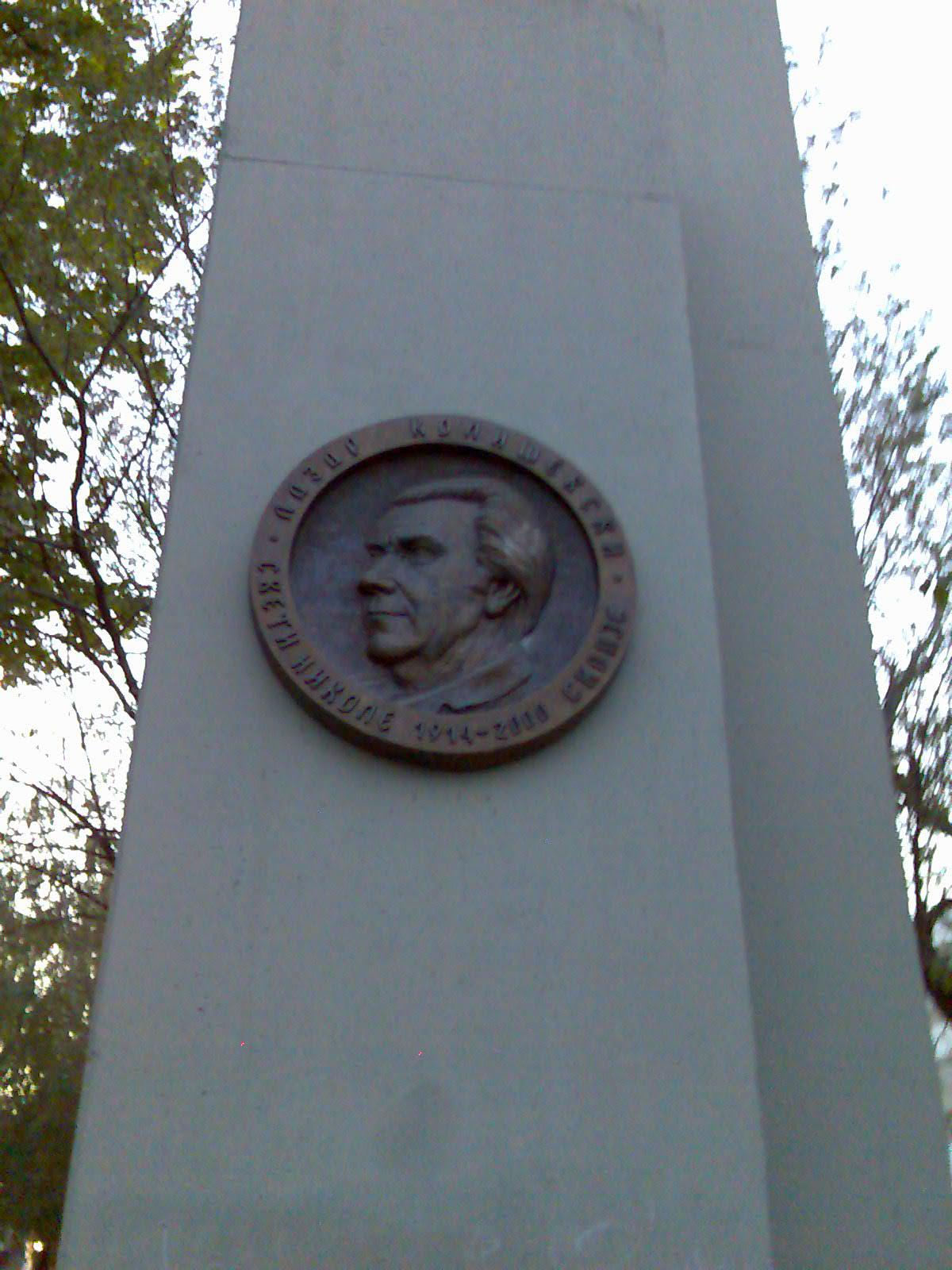
Monument of Lazar Koliševski in his hometown Sveti Nikole. Kolishevski was the first Prime Minister of the SR Macedonia.

The Socialist Republic of Macedonia (Macedonian: Социјалистичка Република Македонија, romanized: Socijalistička Republika Makedonija), or SR Macedonia, commonly referred to as Socialist Macedonia, Yugoslav Macedonia or simply Macedonia, was one of the six constituent republics of the post-World War II Socialist Federal Republic of Yugoslavia. After the transition of the political system to parliamentary democracy in 1990, the Republic changed its official name to Republic of Macedonia in 1991 (now called North Macedonia), and with the beginning of the breakup of Yugoslavia, it declared itself an independent country and held a referendum on 8 September 1991 on which a sovereign and independent state of Macedonia, with a right to enter into any alliance with sovereign states of Yugoslavia was approved.

Geographically, SR Macedonia bordered SR Albania to the west, Greece to the south and PR Bulgaria to the east. Within Yugoslavia, it bordered SR Serbia (including SAP Kosovo) to the north. It was one of the two landlocked federal republics, along with SR Serbia.

== History ==
The first Macedonian state was formally proclaimed under the name Democratic Federal Macedonia (Macedonian: Демократска Федерална Македонија, romanized: Demokratska Federalna Makedonija) at the First Plenary Session of the Anti-Fascist Assembly for the People's Liberation of Macedonia (ASNOM) during World War II. It was set up clandestinely on 2 August 1944 in the Bulgarian occupation zone in Yugoslavia (in the Prohor Pčinjski Monastery, now in Serbia). This date is celebrated in North Macedonia as the Republic Day. It was chosen intentionally, as it was the date of the Ilinden Uprising against Ottoman rule in 1903. However, after the Bulgarian Army retreated from the region under Soviet pressure, on 8 September, right-wing Internal Macedonian Revolutionary Organization nationalists declared a pro-German Macedonian puppet-state. In early October, under the leadership of the new Bulgarian pro-Soviet government, the Bulgarian Army re-entered Yugoslavia to block the German forces in their withdrawal from Greece. In Macedonia the Bulgarians fought side-by-side with the fighters of the People's Liberation Army of Macedonia.

Vardar Banovina was de facto liberated from the Germans and their collaborationists in late November 1944, so the ASNOM became operational in December, shortly after the German retreat. Nevertheless, in December anti-communist Albanian nationalists in Western Macedonia tried to remain in control of the region after the Yugoslav Partisans announced victory. They aimed to resist incorporation of the area into communist Yugoslavia and it was only in early 1945 that the Yugoslav Partisans were able to establish their control over the mountainous area.

The nature of the new Yugoslav state remained unclear immediately after the war. Yugoslavia was envisioned by the Partisans as a "Democratic Federation", including six federal states. When Tito's nomination as Prime Minister was accepted on 29 November 1945, the Socialist Federal Republic of Yugoslavia was declared, with its constitution coming into force in 1946. As a result, Macedonia changed its name to the People's Republic of Macedonia and was incorporated as a constituent republic in the Yugoslav Federation.

People with various degrees of allegedly being pro-Bulgarian orientation (in the most cases they were pro-Independence and anti-Yugoslav patriotic Macedonians) were purged from their positions, then isolated, arrested and imprisoned on fabricated charges. In many cases they were executed en masse, such as during the Bloody Christmas of 1945. The number of victims remains unclear, Bulgarian academic sources claim 1,200 people were allegedly killed. Revisionist historian Zoran Todorovski estimated the number of victims during the era as 50,000, including those killed, imprisoned, deported, subject to forced labor, torture, etc. However, these figures have been questioned by some Bulgarian researchers, also noting that the assertion that these individuals were persecuted and killed solely on account of their Bulgarian national consciousness is deceptive.

The national Macedonian language was codified in 1945 and the first publishing house "Prosvetno Delo" was established on 16 April 1945. The state was formed on the territory of Vardar Banovina, a part of the wider geographical region of Macedonia, which was divided between several countries. Some Macedonian politicians from the Republic advocated the idea of a United Macedonia, which would include Aegean Macedonia and Pirin Macedonia. The idea was somewhat supported by the federal Yugoslav authorities on some occasions, or repressed, depending on the regional and international political situation.

The establishment of the Macedonian republic inspired strong loyalty to the Yugoslav federation among the Macedonians. Some people were against the federation and demanded greater independence from the federal authorities, leading to their persecution. One of the notable victims of these purges was the first president, Metodija Andonov-Čento. To wipe out the remnants of Bulgarophile sentiments, the Yugoslavian communists started a process of Macedonization and nation-building.

== Constitution ==
Constitution of the Socialist Republic of Macedonia, 1974 – Official Gazette (in Macedonian)

The Socialist Republic of Macedonia, which was defined as a national state of the Macedonians and also a state of its ethnic minorities, had some powers normally associated with an independent state. The Constitution also recognized the right of self-determination and secession. The borders of the Socialist Republic of Macedonia could only be changed by decision of the republic's parliament. Its inhabitants held both Yugoslav citizenship and an internal Macedonian citizenship for state business.

The Socialist Republic of Macedonia had its own constitution, presidency, government, parliament, official language, state symbols, Macedonian Academy of Sciences and Arts, Secretariat of Internal Affairs (Interior ministry), Bureau for Foreign Relations (Ministry of Foreign Affairs) and other state prerogatives. Also, the Socialist Republic of Macedonia had its own Territorial Defence armed forces (Macedonian: Територијална одбрана, Teritorijalna odbrana).

=== System ===
The Socialist Republic of Macedonia was a one-party communist state, the ruling political party being the League of Communists of Macedonia (in Macedonian: Сојуз на Комунистите на Македонија, Sojuz na Komunistite na Makedonija, abbreviation: СКМ, SKM). Being a constituent state of Yugoslavia, a leading founder of the Non-Aligned Movement, SR Macedonia pursued a neutral foreign policy and maintained a more liberal communist system compared to other communist states. The ruling ideology was based on Titoism and Workers' self-management (Macedonian: самоуправување, samoupravuvanje).

=== Minorities ===
While the Macedonians were the majority and were one of the constituent nations of SFR Yugoslavia (official term: narod) the rights of the ethnic minorities (official term: narodnosti) were guaranteed by the Constitution. The official language of SR Macedonia was Macedonian, however Macedonian Albanians and Macedonian Turks had the right to use their own languages within the school system and the media. The constitution of the SR Macedonia defined the state as the national state of the ethnic Macedonians, but also as the state of Albanians and Turks. In 1989, the Yugoslav Macedonian authorities revised the constitution, defining SR Macedonia as a "nation-state of Macedonian people".

From the start of Yugoslav rule in Macedonia, accusations surfaced that the new authorities were involved in retribution against people who did not support the formation of the new Macedonian national identity. The number of victims due to organized killings of Bulgarians is unclear. Bulgarian sources claim that thousands of people were killed after 1944 and that more than 100,000 people were put in prison under the "Law for the Protection of Macedonian National Honor". Per political scientist Mirjana Maleska, Bulgarophobia increased almost to the level of state ideology in SR Macedonia.

=== Religion ===
Although the ruling communists discouraged religion, religious freedom was allowed to a certain extent. The authorities allowed the existence of the Macedonian Orthodox Church, which proclaimed autocephaly in 1967. In 1972 the construction of the largest orthodox church St. Clement of Ohrid in the capital of Skopje began. Muslims, Catholics, Protestants and other religious communities also could maintain their own organisations and places of worship.

=== Geography ===
The Socialist Republic of Macedonia was the 4th largest constituent country of SFR Yugoslavia both by area and population. Within Yugoslavia, it had an internal border with the Socialist Republic of Serbia to the north and its subunit the Socialist Autonomous Province of Kosovo to the northwest, and had international borders with the People's Socialist Republic of Albania to the west, Greece to the south, and the People's Republic of Bulgaria to the east.

== Transition ==
In 1990 the form of government peacefully changed from socialist state to parliamentary democracy. The first pluralist elections were held on 11 November the same year. The once ruling communist party took a reformist direction and renamed itself League of Communists of Macedonia – Party for Democratic Change led by Petar Gošev. After the head of the last communist presidency Vladimir Mitkov resigned, Kiro Gligorov became the first democratically elected president of the Socialist Republic of Macedonia on 27 January 1991. (Note: Kiro Gligorov was elected president on 27 January 1991, when SR Macedonia was still an official name of the nation. After the change of the state's name, he continued his function as a President of the Republic of Macedonia – The Official Site of The President of the Republic of Macedonia)

On 16 April, parliament adopted a constitutional amendment removing "Socialist" from the official name of the entity, and on 7 June the new name Republic of Macedonia was officially established. After the process of dissolution of Yugoslavia began, the Republic of Macedonia issued a Sovereignty Declaration on 25 January 1991 and later proclaimed itself a fully independent country, following a referendum held on 8 September 1991.

The Republic of North Macedonia is the legal successor to the Socialist Republic of Macedonia. It was known as the Republic of Macedonia until February 2019 when it underwent an official name change following the Prespa agreement with Greece in June 2018 which resolved a long-standing naming dispute.

== Heads of institutions ==
=== Presidents of ASNOM ===
- Metodija Andonov-Čento
- Lazar Koliševski

=== Presidents of Presidency of Parliament ===
- Lazar Koliševski
- Vidoe Smilevski

=== Presidents of Parliament ===
- Dimče-Mire Stojanov
- Lazar Koliševski
- Ljupčo Arsov
- Vidoe Smilevski
- Mito Hadživasilev
- Nikola Minčev

=== Presidents of Presidency ===
- Vidoe Smilevski
- Ljupčo Arsov
- Angel Čemerski
- Blagoja Talevski
- Tome Bukleski
- Vančo Apostolski
- Dragoljub Stavrev
- Jezdimir Bogdanski
- Vladimir Mitkov

=== Prime Ministers ===
- Lazar Koliševski (1945–1953)
- Ljupčo Arsov (1953–1961)
- Aleksandar Grličkov (1961–1965)
- Nikola Minčev (1965–1968)
- Ksente Bogoev (1968–1974)
- Blagoja Popov (1974–1982)
- Dragoljub Stavrev (1982–1986)
- Gligorije Gogovski (1986–1991)
