= List of presidents of the Chamber of Nationalities of the Federal Assembly of Yugoslavia =

The president of the Chamber of Nationalities was the presiding officer of the Chamber of Nationalities of the Federal Assembly of Yugoslavia.

== Officeholders ==
- Ljupčo Arsov
- Vida Tomsić
- Mika Špiljak

== Sources ==
- Various editions of The Europa World Year Book
