= Georgi Konstantinovski =

Macedonian architect (1930–2020)

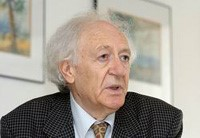
- Born: 29 July 1930; Kragujevac, Serbia
- Died: 8 December 2020 (aged 90); Skopje, North Macedonia
- Occupation: Architect
- Parent(s): Hristina Konstantinovska; Hristo Konstantinovski
- Awards: "Borba" plaquette for the Archive of Skopje "Andrea Damjanov" Lifetime Achievement Award
- Buildings: Archive of the city of Skopje, 1965; Student dormitory "Goce Delchev", Skopje, 1969; Institute for Earthquake Engineering and Engineering Seismology, Skopje, 1978/1980; Memorial Home of the Uprising "Razlovechko", Razlovci, 1979/80; Memorial Museum "ASNOM" in Pelince, 2004

Georgi Konstantinovski (29 July 1930 – 8 December 2020) was a Macedonian architect, writer and educator. He graduated from the SS Cyril and Methodius University, Faculty of Architecture in Skopje in 1956 and received his Master of Architecture Degree from Yale University, under the mentorship of Paul Rudolph and Serge Chermayeff, in 1965. His early works are stylistically considered Brutalist. In New York City, he worked and collaborated with I. M. Pei, Henry Cobb Jr., and Araldo Cossutta.

In his search for design features that reflect the individual philosophy, structure, and art of each building, Konstantinovski designed more than 450 architectural and urban projects. He was awarded the highest Macedonian and Yugoslav architectural awards, such as the highest National Award for Art "11 Oktomvri" for Best Architectural Achievement in Skopje, in addition to three Grand Prix on the Architectural Biennale in Macedonia. He further contributed to contemporary Macedonian architecture as an educator and writer. He was President of the Council for Urban Planning and Dean of the Faculty of Architecture in Skopje, and a member of the Architectural Academy of Macedonia.

Konstantinovski was an important contributor to contemporary Macedonian architecture. Some of his most renowned buildings are the City Archive in Skopje, the Student's Dormitories "Goce Delcev", the Institute of Earthquake Engineering and Engineering Seismology, the ASNOM Memorial Center, and the Memorial House of Razlovci Uprising.

Konstantinovski died on 8 December 2020, at the age of 90.

== Early years ==
Born on 29 July 1930, in the town of Kragujevac in Serbia, Konstantinovski was the third child of mother Hristina, a high-school teacher, and father Hristo, a lawyer. His mother came from the Stankovic family of musicians, well known in Kragujevac. His father was from the clan Curanovci of the village Smilevo, a revolutionary family during the Ilinden Uprising.

Following the death of his mother (1933) and father (1934), Konstantinovski settled in Bitola in the Kingdom of Yugoslavia with his grandparents. He completed primary school there in 1941. The same year, Konstantinovski contracted malaria and was sent for treatment to Berkovitsa in the Balkan Mountains, Bulgaria, until 1946. By 1946, he completed his high school education and was declared—together with fellow student Bojan Nicev from Veles—the best student. From 1946 to 1949, he continued his education at the High School Goce Delcev in Bitola. He graduated with excellent scores and again was declared best student. He was also awarded a special reward by the Ministry of Education of the Republic of Macedonia.

== Education and work ==
In 1949, following the planned program of the Ministry of Education, Konstantinovski enrolled in the Architecture Department of the Technical Faculty in Skopje. In 1953, he worked on seaside residential settlement projects in the town of Haifa, Israel, at the Bureau of the Architect Samo Almosnino, as well as kibbutz city planning projects at the Jewish Agency Bureau. In 1956, he graduated from the Faculty of Architecture with distinctions and was employed at the Bureau of City Planning and Architecture in Skopje, to work on city planning for the town settlements of Zdanec and Cair. From 1956 to 1957, he did his military service with the engineering army unit in Split, Croatia.

In 1958, Konstantinovski became an assistant at the Technical Faculty, Skopje–Architecture Department on the subject of "Designing of Residential and Catering Buildings". He began practicing housing architecture in 1969 at the Bureau „Projekat", headed by architect Rajko Tatic, in Belgrade. In 1965, he obtained his master's degree at Yale University, Faculty of Arts and Architecture, under the mentorship of Paul Rudolph and Serge Chemaef. He worked on an administrative building project in 1965 at the Bureau of the Architect I. M. Pei in New York City.

From 1995 until his retirement, Konstantinovski was a full-time professor at the Faculty of Architecture in Skopje.

=== Professional career ===
- 1958–95
  - Moved from assistant to full-time professor of the subject Designing of Residential and Catering Buildings
  - Mentor to students obtaining M.Sc. and Ph.D. degrees, and post-graduates, and several hundred graduates
  - Head of the Design Institute
- 1983 – President of the Urbanism Council of the City of Skopje
- 1987–88 – Dean of the Faculty of Architecture, SS Cyril and Methodius University, Skopje
- 1999 – Member of the Macedonian Academy of Architecture

=== Lectures ===
- 1966–67 – 10 lectures on the greatest architects of the modern world architecture to architects in Skopje
- 1977 – Modern Architecture in Macedonia at Kolarcev University in Belgrade
- 1988 – My Architectural Work at the Faculty of Architecture in Belgrade
- 1990 – Modern Architecture of Skopje at the International Congress of Architects in Bursa, Turkey
- 1991–97 – Several lectures at the International Congress of Architects in Bursa, Turkey
- 1994 – New Way of Housing at "Jildiz" University, Istanbul, Turkey

=== Publications ===
- 1967–68 – Editor-in-chief of articles on architecture in the daily newspaper Vecer
- 1978–80 – Participant in the joint scientific piece of work Rational Residential Construction, Faculty of Architecture, Skopje
- 1986 – XX Century Architecture, „Prosveta", Belgrade, chapter: "Modern Architecture in Macedonia"
- 2001 – Builders in Macedonia VIII-XX century, volume 1, "Tabernakul", Skopje
- 2003 – Builders in Macedonia VIII-XX century, volume 2, "Tabernakul", Skopje
- 2006 – Builders in Macedonia VIII-XX century, volume 3, "Tabernakul", Skopje

== Designs ==
=== List of significant buildings ===
- 1966 – Archive of the City of Skopje, Blvd. "Partizanski Odredi"
- 1967 – Pensioners Recreation Home at Katlanovska Banja
- 1969 – Students Dormitory "Goce Delcev", Skopje
- 1971 – Printing House in Pristina, Kosovo – 40,000 m^{2} (430,000 sq ft)
- 1972 – Town Archive Building of Stip
- 1974 – Town Archive Building of Ohrid
- 1978 – Institute of Earthquake Engineering and Engineering Seismology "IZIIS", Skopje
- 1979 – Memorial House of Razlovci Uprising in village Razlovci, near Delcevo
- 1983 – Strumicko-Povardarska Eparchy, Veles
- 1988 – Architectural and Urban Concept of the settlement "Jagula", Struga
- 1989 – Administrative building and two residential blocks (GF+3 stories) at "Marsal Tito" Street, Struga
- 1993 – Palace "Unija“ at "Ivo Ribar Lola" Street, Skopje
- 1994 – Administrative-commercial building (Palace "Kuzman“) at "Ivo Ribar Lola" 58 Street, Skopje
- 1995 – Residential building (GF+ Mezzanine +4 stories +top story) at "29 Noemvri" Street, Skopje (opposite Performance Hall "Univerzalna sala")
- 1995 – Treatment Home „Sue Raider", Gjorce Petrov, Skopje

=== Studies ===
- 1986–2003
  - Piransa, Pirastela, and Piradonija: studies on living in high residential structures
  - Studies on low residential structures
  - Studies on atrium houses in various geometric forms (e.g. circle, triangle, square, polygon, spiral)
- 2006 – Residential mega-structure

=== Competitions ===
- 1969 – 1st prize, Students' Dormitory "Goce Delcev", Skopje
- 1977 – 1st prize, Skopje City Hall (the only award)
- 1993 – 1st prize, Orthodox Basilica in Strumica
- 1998 – 1st prize, Parliament Building in Astana, Kazakhstan
- 2005 – 1st prize, Memorial Museum ASNOM, village Pelince, Kumanovo
- Big number of first-ranked works, as well as many II and III prizes at level of former Yugoslavia.

== Awards ==
- 1969 – Borba plaquette for the Archive of Skopje
- 1969 – 11 Oktomvri National award for the Archive of Skopje
- 1972 – Borba plaquette for the Students' Dormitory "Goce Delcev", Skopje
- 1981 – Borba plaquette for the Memorial House of Razlovci Uprising in village Razlovci, near Delcevo
- 1981 – Grand Award of BIMAS for the Memorial House of Razlovci Uprising in village Razlovci
- 1988 – Medal of labor with gold wreath
- 1995 – Grand Reward of BIMAS for the Palace "Unija", Skopje
- 1999 – Award Andrea Damjanov for lifework
- 2005 – Grand Award for architecture for the Memorial Museum "ASNOM"

=== Honorary duties ===
- 1965 – Guest of the Senator Robert Kennedy and the State Secretary, Mr. McPherson, in Washington on the occasion of the International Students Day in the US as the only representative of the university in Yale, New Haven, USA
- 1991 – Declared the best architect of Yugoslavia at the Third Belgrade Triennial of World Architecture
- 1991 – Declared one among the 55 best world architects at the Third Belgrade Triennial World Architecture
