= March of the Macedonian Revolutionaries =

Song by Aleksandar Morfov

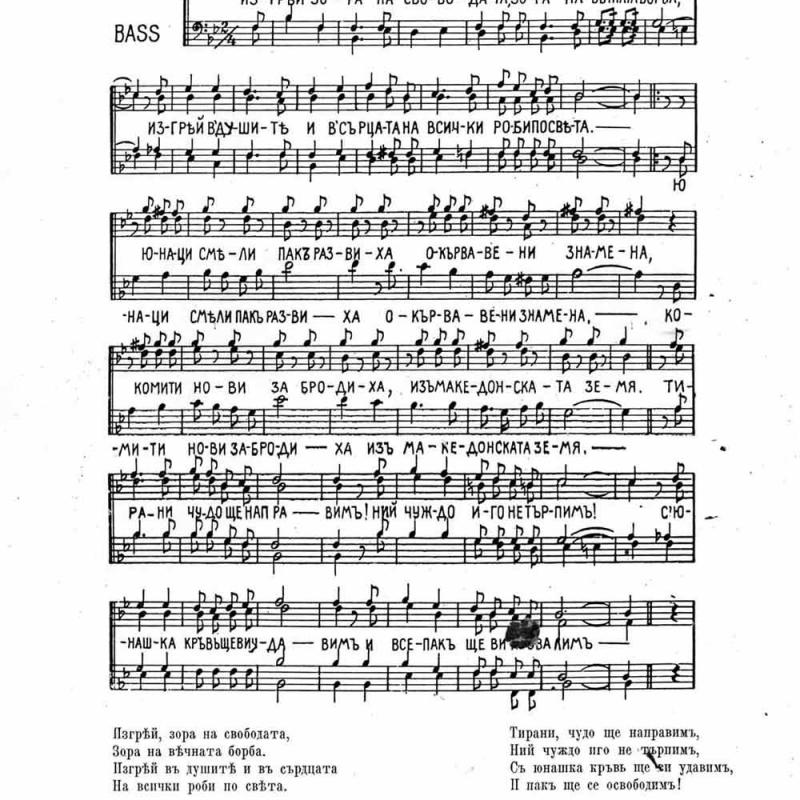

Song by Aleksandar Morfov
- Language: Bulgarian
- Written: 1923
- Published: 1925
- Songwriter(s): Aleksandar Morfov

The "March of the Macedonian Revolutionaries" (Bulgarian: „Марш на македонските революционери“; Macedonian: „Марш на македонските револуционери“), also known as "Rise, Dawn of Freedom" (Bulgarian: „Изгрей зора на свободата“; Macedonian: „Изгреј зора на слободата“), is a Bulgarian march which was used by the Internal Macedonian Revolutionary Organization (IMRO). The march is still used by the Macedonian Patriotic Organization (MPO), as well as by VMRO-BND and the Radko Association.

== History ==
The lyrics and music of the march were written by Aleksandar Morfov, a Bulgarian military composer in 1923 at a contest by the IMRO. The proposed march was presented to the leader of IMRO, Todor Alexandrov, by the composer at the home of General Kosta Nikolov in Sofia. In the period before World War II, the march was performed as the official anthem of the IMRO. The poet Kočo Racin tried to adapt the chorus of the song to the still non-standardized Macedonian language shortly before his death in 1943.

The first Anti-fascist Assembly for the National Liberation of Macedonia meeting, held on August 2, 1944, at the Prohor Pčinjski Monastery was opened with the singing of the song. After the Tito-Stalin split in 1948, the song was banned by the Yugoslav and Macedonian communist authorities as anti-patriotic and pro-Bulgarian. There is reserved attitude towards this song in North Macedonia. The MPO, VMRO-BND and the Radko Association still use the song.

On August 2, 2017, during a service commemorating the Ilinden Uprising, the monks from the Saint Jovan Bigorski Monastery in Republic of Macedonia, performed the song, expressing their approval of the friendship treaty signed with Bulgaria the day before. Afterwards the song continued to be performed there on August 2, to commemorate the Ilinden Uprising.
