= Rubens Korubin =

Macedonian artist

Rubens Korubin (born 1949 in Prilep) is an artist based in Skopje.

== Education and career ==
Korubin graduated from the Faculty of Fine Arts in Belgrade in 1974 and completed his postgraduate studies in the class of Mladen Srbinovic in 1976. From 1977 till 1979, he attended a specialization course in Paris at L’Ecole des Beaux Arts. He was a full-time professor at the Ss. Cyril and Methodius University of Skopje, Faculty of Fine Arts in Skopje, Macedonia until his retirement in 2013. Rubens attended numerous group exhibitions in Macedonia and abroad. He also realized more than 20 one-man shows in Skopje, Belgrade, Paris etc.

== Solo exhibitions ==
1979 Skopje, Gallery DLUM

1980 Sombor, Artistic Autumn

1980 Skopje, Cultural Centre of Skopje

1982 Belgrade, Art Gallery of the Cultural Centre

1985 Prilep, Cultural Centre Marko Cepenkov

1985 Bitola, Art Gallery Mosha Pijade

1985 Skopje, Art Gallery Daut Pasha Amam

1987 Belgrade, Art Gallery Atrium

1992 Skopje, Art Gallery Daut Pasha Amam

1997 Paris, Art Gallery Le Lys

1998 Skopje, Art Gallery MANU

2001 Skopje, Museum of Skopje City

2010 Skopje, Cultural Information Centre - Skopje "Moonlight stories"

2011 Toronto, Canada, Bezpala Brown Gallery "The Artist and His Muse"

The art of Rubens Korubin is part of few museum's permanent exhibitions:

- Banja Luka, 30 Years - Museum of Contemporary Art Banja Luka, Bosnia and Herzegovina

- National Art Gallery of Macedonia

- Museum of Modern Art Skopje Macedonia

- Museum of Contemporary Art Skopje, Macedonia

== Awards ==
Korubin received the following awards:

1977 – Skopje, Award for painting at the exhibition “Young generation 3”

1978 – Skopje, Award for Drawing “Kliment Ohridski” from DLUM exhibition

1979 – Skopje, Award for painting “The Nerezi Masters” at the DLUM exhibition

1981 – Skopje, Award for painting “Mosha Pijade” at 7th exhibition of SDLUJ

2004 – Skopje, Grand Prix at the winter Salon exhibition by DLUM

== Monuments ==
2006 Mosaic Macedonia in the Memorial Centre ASNOM - Pelince

2004 Mosaic Cupidae Legum Iuventuti at the faculty of Law Iustinijanus Primus in Skopje

== Quotes about the artist ==
"Rubens is among those artists that have succeeded in their work to surmount, for themselves and for us, the limit of human fortuity. To convince us (or "fool" us) with his gentle artistic "caress" on the canvas, the velvet layers of delicately selected and coordinated colours that vibrate with the movements of nature, that the search for artistic "beauty" is still and very much worth our while. This is the form of struggle that Rubens has chosen to rise over the hopelessness and the ugliness that hover over modern day humanity in more ways than one." Boris Petkovski, author
