= Anti-fascist Assembly for the National Liberation of Macedonia =

Supreme governmental body of communist Macedonia from 1944 to 1945

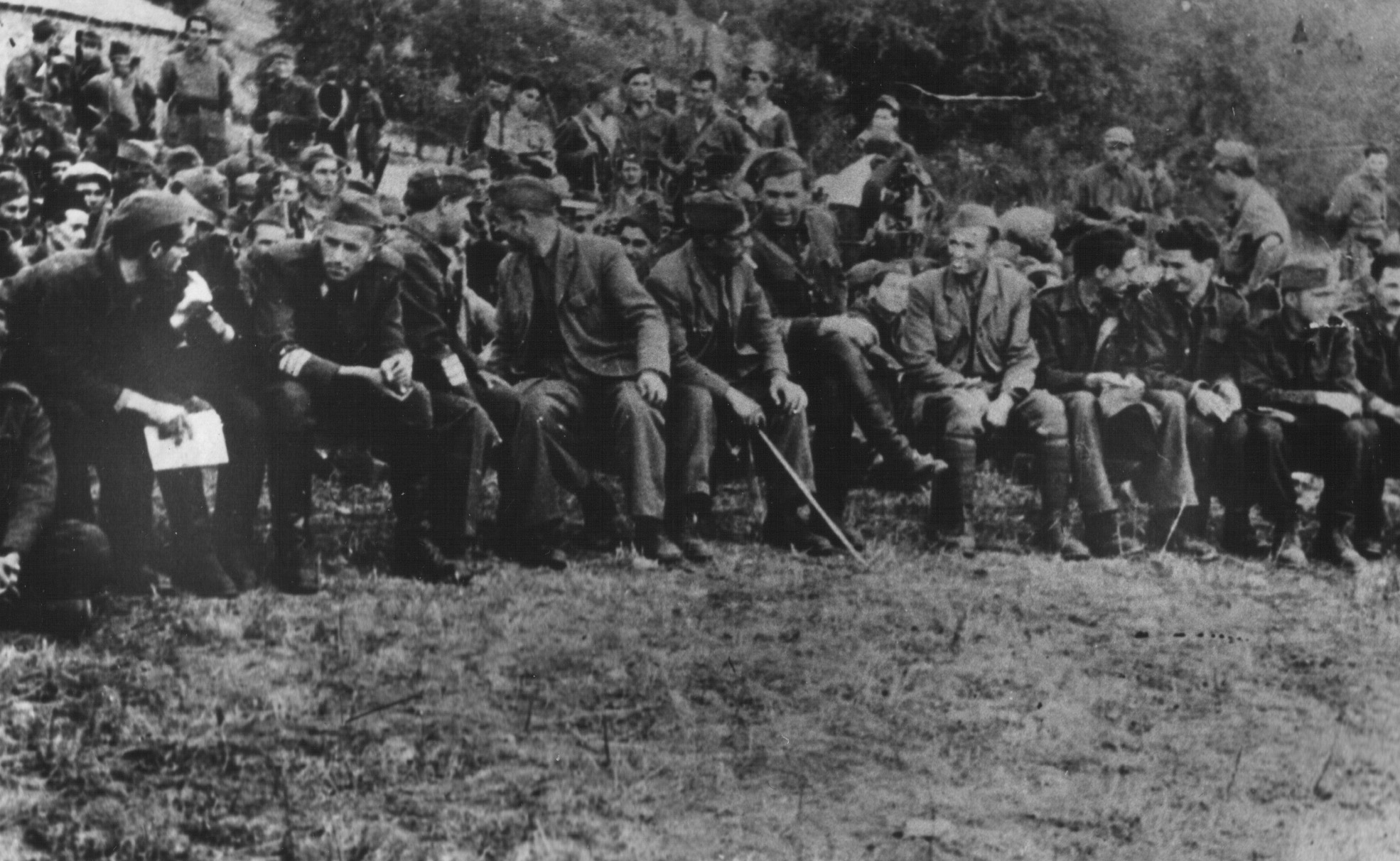
Some of the delegates on the First Assembly of ASNOM.

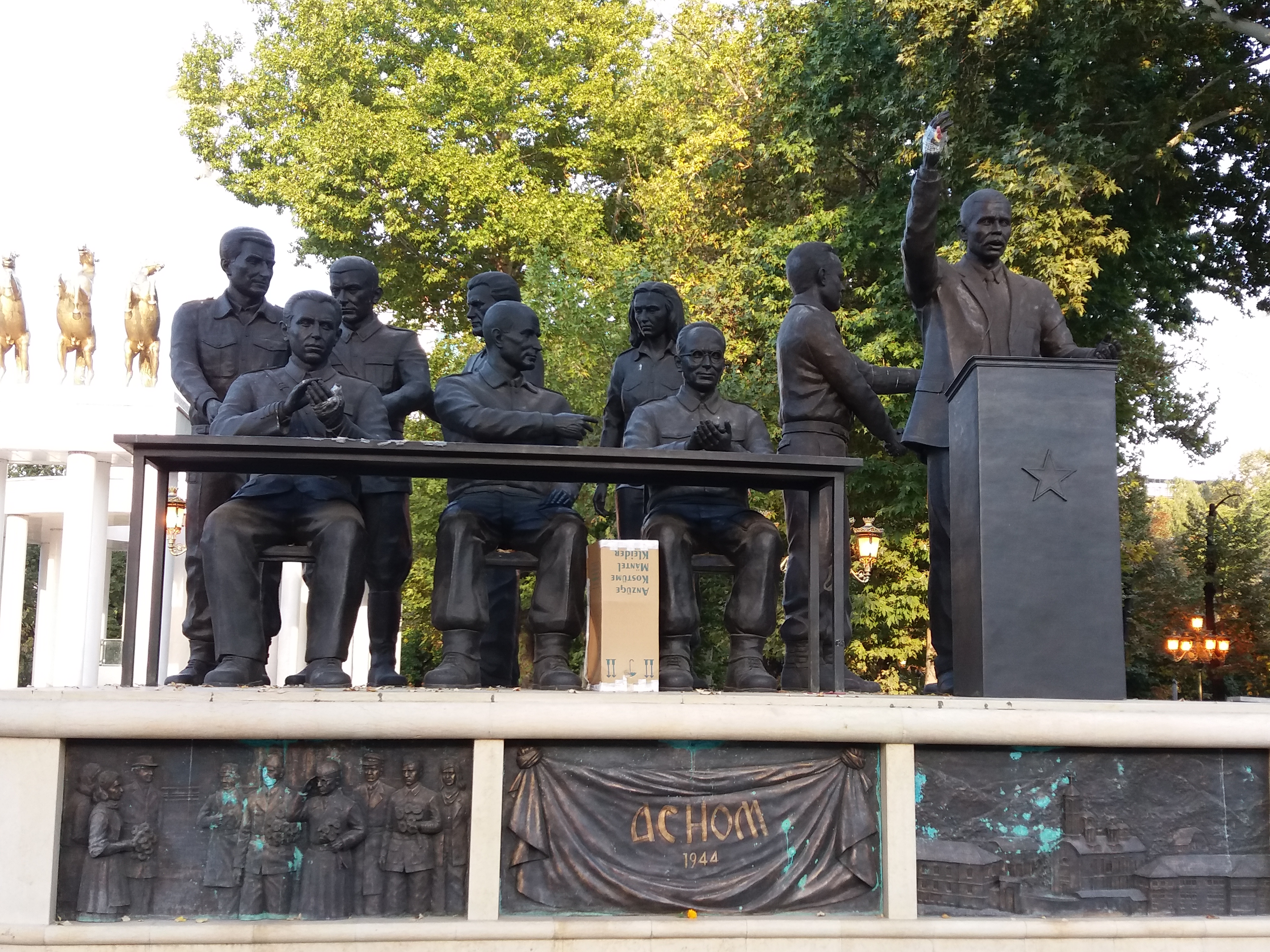
Monument of the First Plenary Session of ASNOM in Skopje.

The Anti-fascist Assembly for the National Liberation of Macedonia (Macedonian: Антифашистичко собрание за народно ослободување на Македонија (АСНОМ), Antifašističko sobranie za narodno osloboduvanje na Makedonija; Serbo-Croatian: Antifašističko vijeće narodnog oslobođenja Makedonije; abbr. ASNOM) was the supreme legislative and executive people's representative body of the communist Macedonian state from August 1944 until the end of World War II. The body was set up by the Macedonian Partisans during the final stages of the World War II in Yugoslav Macedonia (National Liberation Struggle), clandestinely in August 1944, in the Bulgarian occupation zone of Yugoslavia.

== History ==
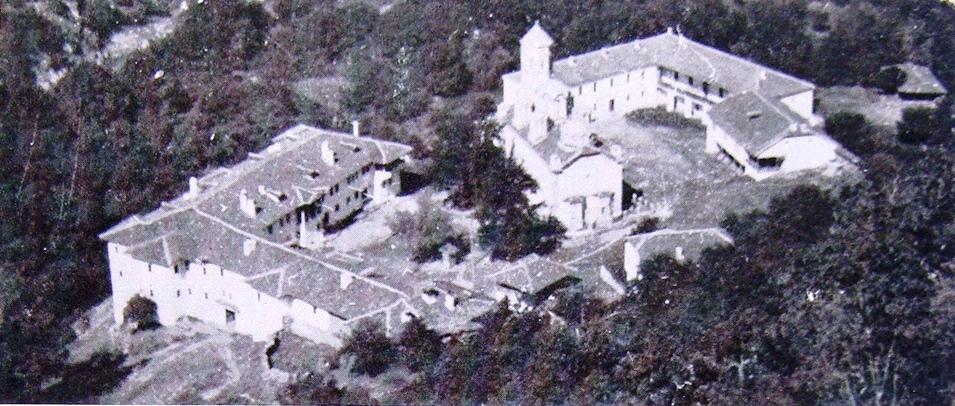
St. Prohor Pčinjski Monastery in 1944.

=== First session (under occupation) ===
==== Significance ====
The first plenary session of ASNOM has been dubbed as the "Second Ilinden" by Macedonians because it was convened underground on the symbolic date of August 2 (Ilinden Uprising day) 1944 in the St. Prohor Pčinjski Monastery, now in Serbia. (Note: The Monastery and surrounding area, which are part of the region of Macedonia, were transferred from SR Macedonia to SR Serbia in February 1945.) The most important assembly decisions were:

- The proclamation of a Macedonian state as part of Yugoslavia
- The decision to make Macedonian the official language of the Macedonian state
- The guarantee that the citizens of Macedonia, regardless of their ethnic affiliation, would be granted all civil rights, as well as the right to their mother tongue and confession of faith
- The proclamation of Ilinden as a national holiday

The first session was opened with the anthem of the Internal Macedonian Revolutionary Organization (IMRO) - "Rise up dayspring of the freedom" and the unofficial Yugoslav anthem - "Hey, Slavs". The Assembly issued a Manifesto which described Vardar Macedonia's position under the old Yugoslavia as that of a colony and declared 'brotherhood and unity' with the other Yugoslav peoples. It also stated its support for the equality of all nationalities in Macedonia and called on Albanians, Turks and Vlachs to join the national liberation struggle. A call for the "unification of the whole Macedonian people" across the entire region of Macedonia was made. Panko Brashnarov, a former member of IMRO and oldest member, chaired the inaugural meeting, and Metodija Andonov-Čento was elected as president. Both wanted greater independence for the future republic. They saw joining Yugoslavia as a form of second Serbian dominance over Macedonia and preferred membership in a Balkan Federation or else complete independence. Čento and partly Brashnarov clashed with Svetozar Vukmanović-Tempo, Josip Broz Tito's envoy to Macedonia. One of the contributors in the Assembly was Kiro Gligorov, the future first President of the Republic of Macedonia. According to Bulgarian researchers the first session was manipulated by pro-Yugoslav representatives, and the number of present delegates is disputed.

==== Developments ====
In early September, Nazi Germany briefly sought to establish a puppet state called independent Macedonia. However, the state was de facto not established due to the lack of any military support. Despite this, it was declared by Macedonian right nationalists on 8 September. After Bulgaria switched sides in the war on 9 September, the Bulgarian 5th Army stationed in Macedonia moved back to the old borders of Bulgaria. In early October the newly formed Bulgarian People's Army together with the Red Army reentered occupied Yugoslavia. The Germans were driven off from Vardar Macedonia in late November by the Bulgarian Army with the help of Macedonian Partisans.

=== Second session ===
ASNOM became officially operational in December, shortly after the German retreat from Skopje. During this session, Lazar Koliševski, the new leader of the Communist Party of Macedonia, was declared the first deputy to Čento in the ASNOM presidency during the second session of this assembly on 28–31 December. In September 1944, Koliševski, who was a prisoner, was freed by the new Bulgarian pro-communist government. At the same session, a decision was taken for a tribunal to be created that would judge "the collaborators of the occupiers who have panned the Macedonian name and the Macedonian national honor".

=== Third session ===
On the third session held in April 1945, the body transformed itself into a republican parliament. Čento was replaced by Koliševski, who started fully implementing the pro-Yugoslav line and strongly enforced the Macedonian nation-building in SR Macedonia. ASNOM formed a committee to standardize the Macedonian language and its alphabet.

== Aftermath and legacy ==
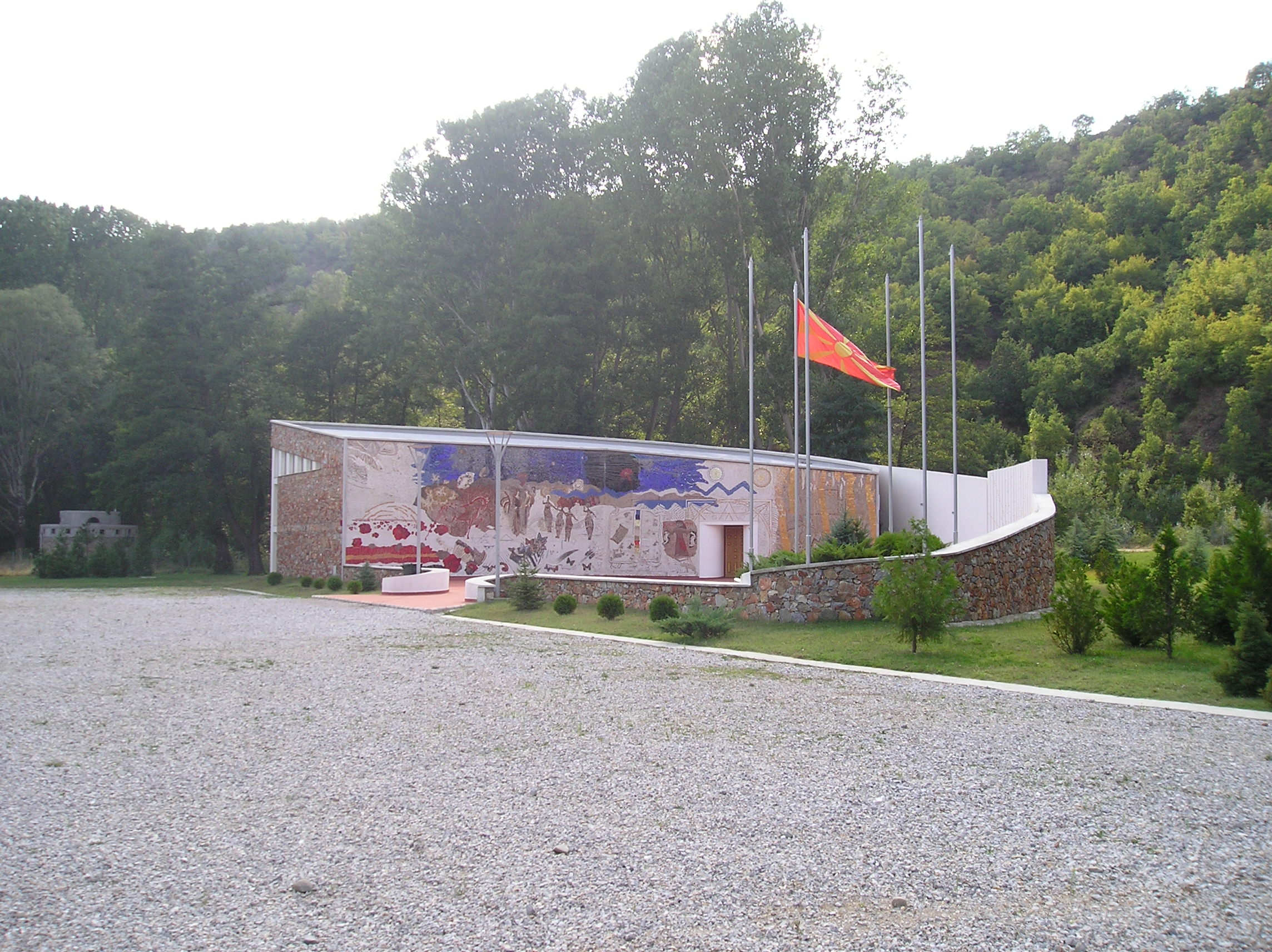
ASNOM Memorial Center in Pelince.

At the end of 1944, the law for the protection of the Macedonian national honor passed by SR Macedonia's government, for which the Presidium of ASNOM created a special court to implement it, and persecuted accused pro-Bulgarian collaborationists in an event that would become known as the Bloody Christmas. In the late 1940s, ASNOM's first leaders Čento, Pavel Shatev and Brashnarov were purged from their positions, then isolated, arrested and imprisoned on fabricated charges, as foreign agents, having pro-Bulgarian leanings, demanding greater independence, collaborating with the Cominform, forming of conspirative political groups, demanding greater democracy and the like.

In present-day North Macedonia, ASNOM became an "object of memory" and it is considered as the date of its statehood, as well as the fulfilment of the aims of the Ilinden Uprising. It is celebrated as a national holiday known as the Day of the Republic.

== Gallery ==
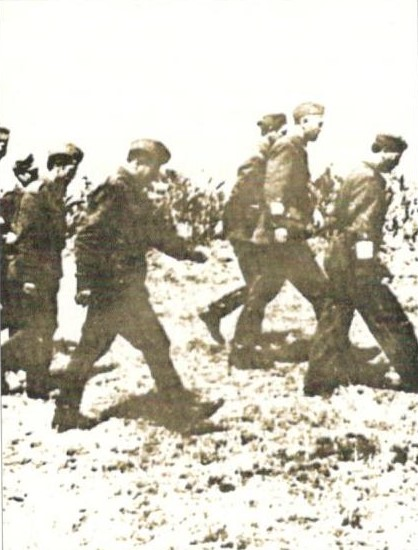
Delegates arriving on the first plenary session of ASNOM

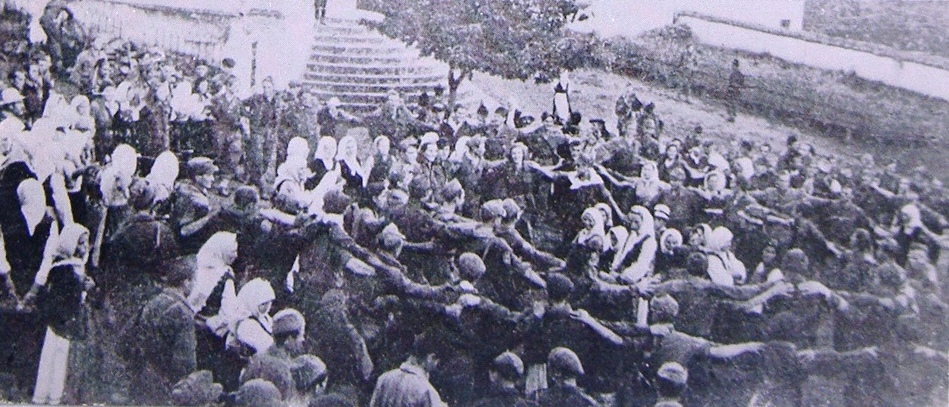
Oro celebration marking the event

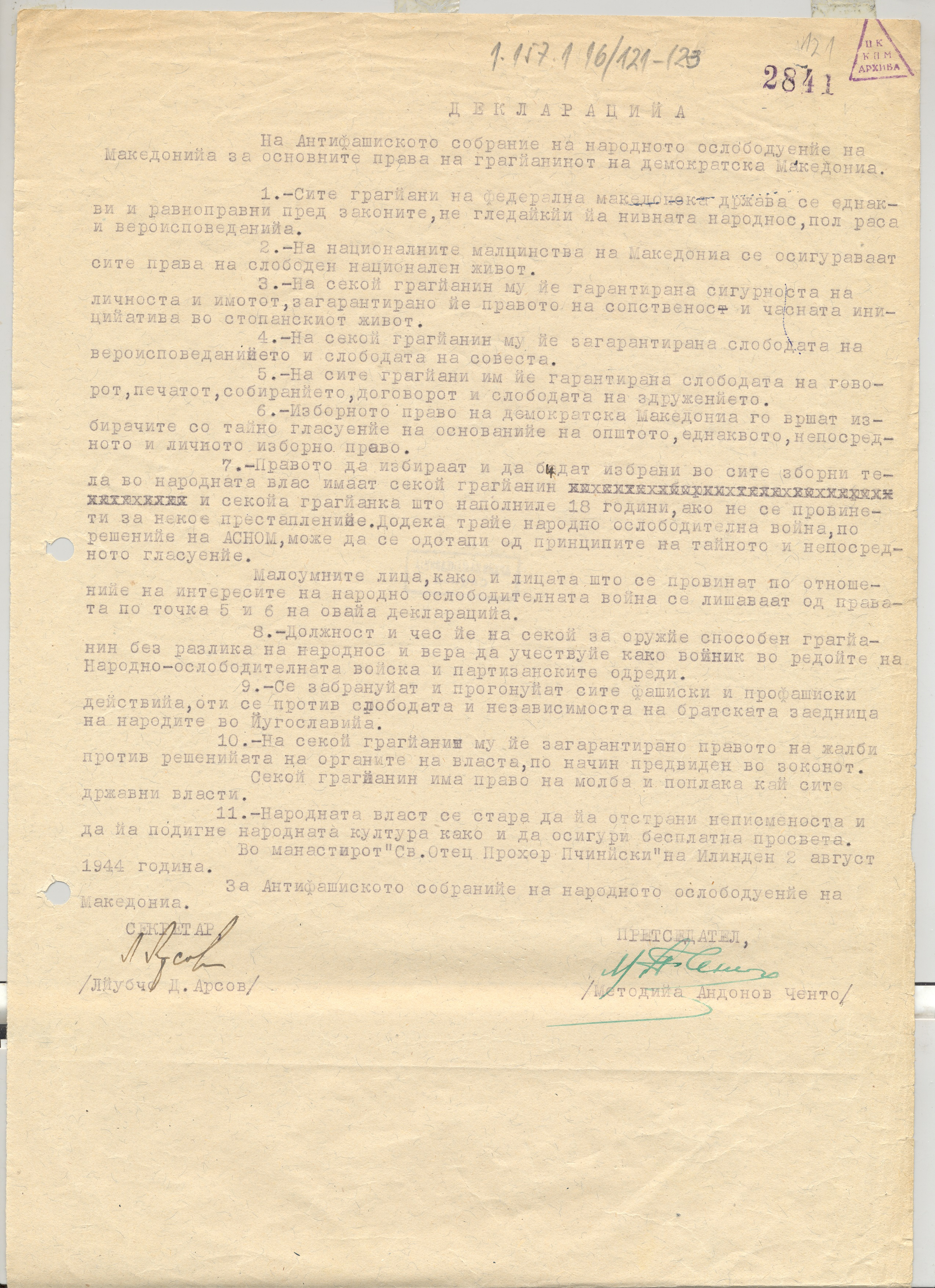
The declaration of ASNOM on the fundamental rights of the citizens of Federal Macedonia (August 2, 1944)

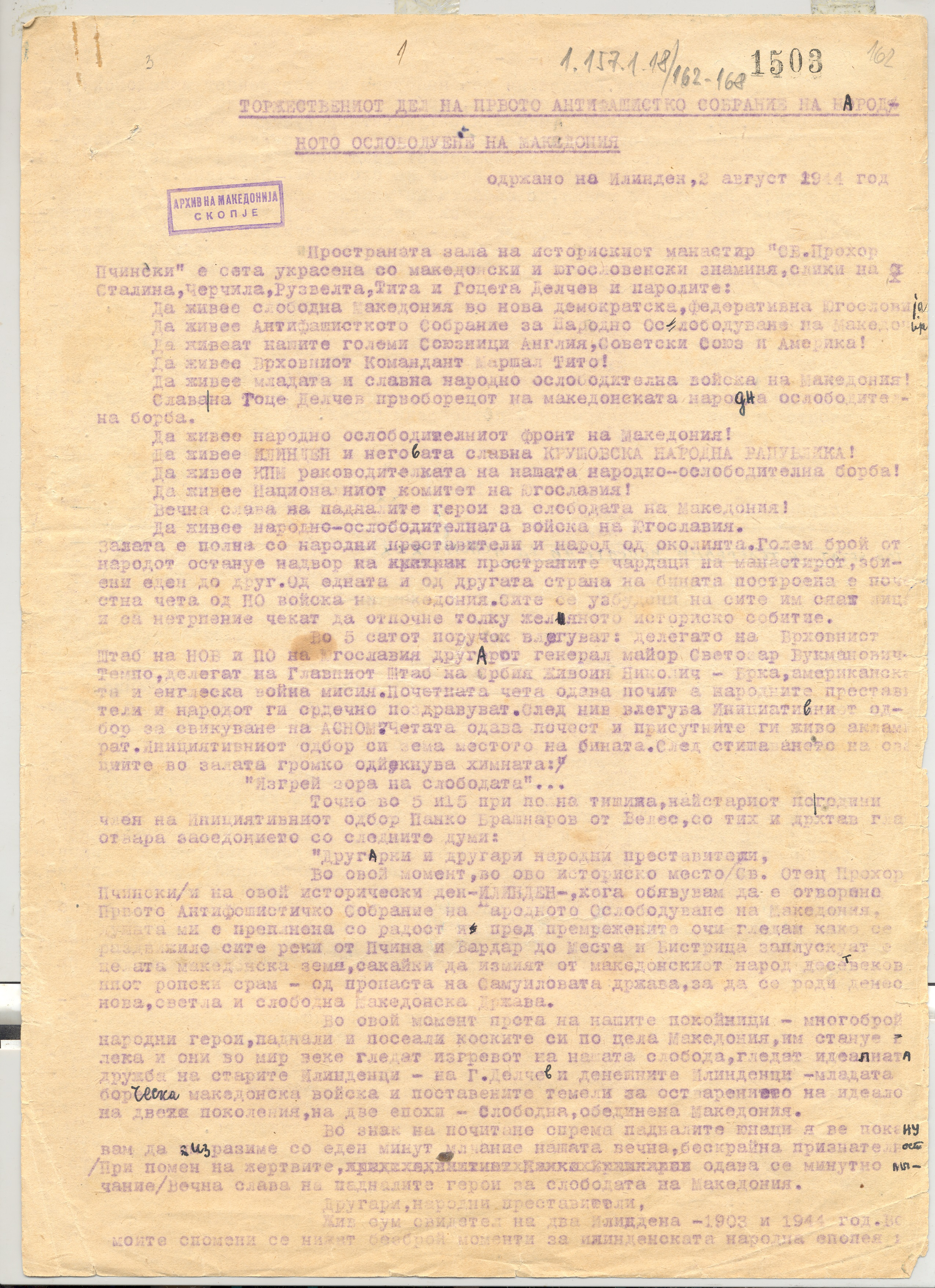
The formal part of the opening of the 1st Session of the Antifascist Assembly of the National Liberation of Macedonia (ASNOM) with the welcoming speech of Panko Brashnarov

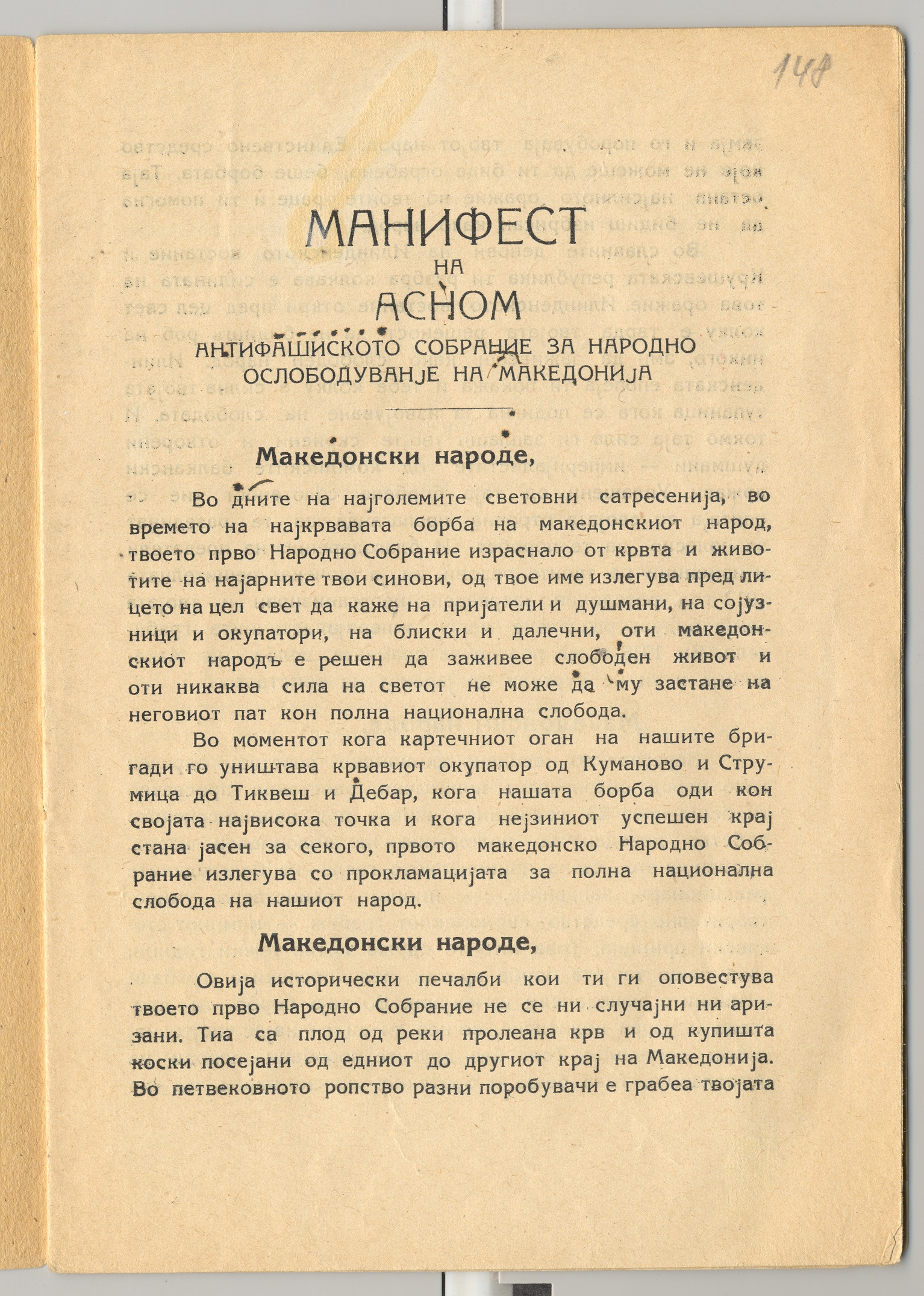
The Manifesto of ASNOM about the struggle of the Macedonian people for national freedom and the establishment of the Macedonian state. (August 2, 1944), First page

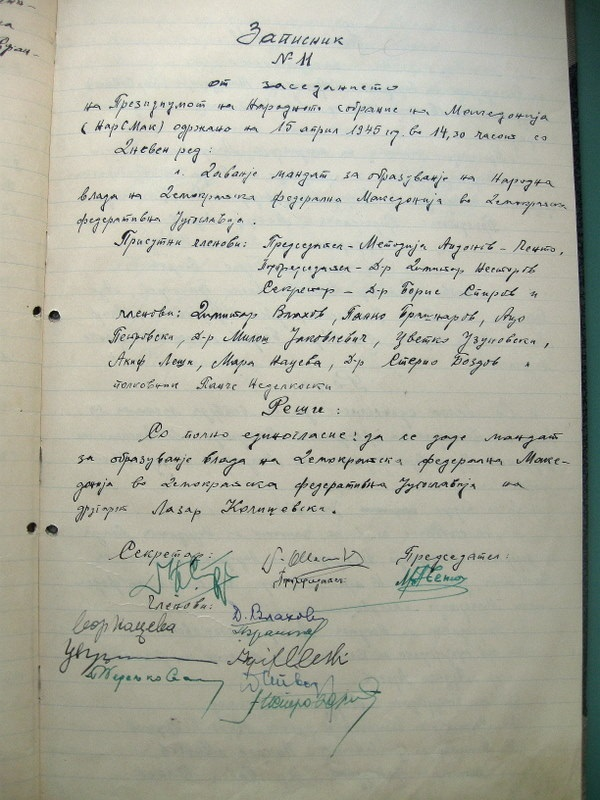
Minutes of the 11th Session of the Presidium of ASNOM suggesting the creation of People's Government of PR Macedonia and assigning mandate to Lazar Kolishevski (April 14, 1945)

== See also ==
- AVNOJ
- Sobranie
- Military history of North Macedonia
