= Haralampi Perev =

- Born: 20 January 1891; Nikodim Prilep, Ottoman Empire
- Died: 13 October 1960 (aged 69); Prilep, Yugoslavia

Haralampi Perev (Bulgarian: Харалампи Перев) (according to some sources Haralampy Perev Iliev, or Perev Haralampy Popov) was a Bulgarian lawyer and campaigner for human rights of Bulgarians in Serbia, Yugoslavia and Macedonia. He was born in the village Nikodin, Prilep, then part of the Ottoman Empire, on 20 January 1891. He died in Prilep on 13 October 1960.

== Early years ==
He received his primary education in Prilep and then went to Constantinople as a pet Exarchal Seminary. After the rebellion of Exarchal wards, he returned to Macedonia and continued his education in Monastir Bulgarian male classical school, where he finished on 26 June 1911. Then he spent one year as an exarchist teacher in Prilep.

== In the Kingdom of Yugoslavia ==
In October 1912, Serbian authorities arrested him in Prilep. After questioning him, he was released and immediately went illegally to Bulgaria and joined the military, his royal Majesty Ferdinand I school. On 25 August 1915, he was promoted to podporuchnik and then participated in the First World War battlefields of the whole of Macedonia to strengthen its locality Pleven Division of Tumba of Belasitza to end the war. He was awarded a medal for bravery - IV degree. He was demobilized as a lieutenant of the Bulgarian Army, and in 1919 he became a student of the Law Faculty in Sofia. After two years of training, he moved to Belgrade to continue his education by working simultaneously to graduating from the Faculty of Law in Belgrade on March 14, 1923. After graduation, he worked as secretary of the Appeals Court in Belgrade, secretary of the Cassation Court in Belgrade, examining judge, then as a judge in Obrenovac, Uzice, Kraljevo, Ub, and Pozarevac, and in 1939 he was appointed chairman of the court in Dubrovnik. In Dubrovnik, he remained only a few months, being retired with pension administration. His retirement was at the command of the Serbian authorities because of its proximity to Croatian nationalists and politicians, mainly because of friendly relations with the leader of the Croatian Peasant Party, Vladko Macek, who throughout his career in the Kingdom of Yugoslavia, it supports and provides for higher positions justice system. At the end of 1939, he returned to bat and opened a law practice.

== During World War II ==
On 6 April 1941, Belgrade was bombed, and so began the collapse of the Kingdom of Yugoslavia. On 7 April, the Serbian army, police, and administration left Bat, allowing the formation of rogue gangs in the area. Therefore, a group of citizens of Prilep, at an informal meeting in the cafeteria "Kai Chesney - Balkan," offered Haralampy Perev mayor - autocrat of Prilep and organizer of the defense of the city and the security of citizens and their properties. He collected the remaining weapons, mostly rifles, runaway Serb army, volunteers collected by citizens, organized by "urban militia," introduces curfew, and manage the city as the only power until the arrival of Bulgarian troops on the 22nd of April. Participates in the formation of the Bulgarian Action Committees and organizes a meeting of the Bulgarian army in Prilep. Throughout the war, Haralampy Perev dealt with Bar and one year spent in Bitola as a mobilized reserve officer of the Bulgarian Army. Simultaneously, it protected part of the Macedonian communists, between which and Metodi Andonov-Cento, in a large trial that leads a military court of the Bulgarian army directly and manages to declare them innocent.

== In Tito's Yugoslavia ==
After the war, again working as a lawyer and defended many accused by Macedonian controversial "law on Macedonian national honor." in view of the time and conditions, the success of legal defence and minimal, however, managed to cancel several death sentences. In 1947 he was arrested under vague accusations, a trial is manipulated trial, and sentenced to three years in prison. Launched two years ago, he was forbidden to exercise Bar, gets right to Bar again in 1950. He was a close friend of Jordan Tchkatrov and his brother Dimitar Tchkatrov, and he was a friend and all Macedonians who were tried in the Skopje student process in 1928. Always described as Bulgarian nationalist michailovist and close to Vanco Mihajlov. By the end of his life living quietly and peacefully isolated in Prilep, where he worked as a lawyer until his last moment.

== Family ==
He married in 1943 to Elena Kuzmanova from Bitola, from a Bulgarian Exarchate family whose cousin was Stephen Kouzmanov, one of the signatories of the famous Memorandum against Macedonism, and sentenced in 1946 to 15 years in prison.

The son of Haralampy Perev, Vladimir Perev, born in 1945, Macedonian and Bulgarian journalist and publicist, was also arrested in 1963 by the authorities and Tito accused of membership of IMRO /aka vanchomihaylovizam/, Bulgarian nationalist and anti-Yugoslavian.
