= Klenike =

Klenike Кленике
- Village
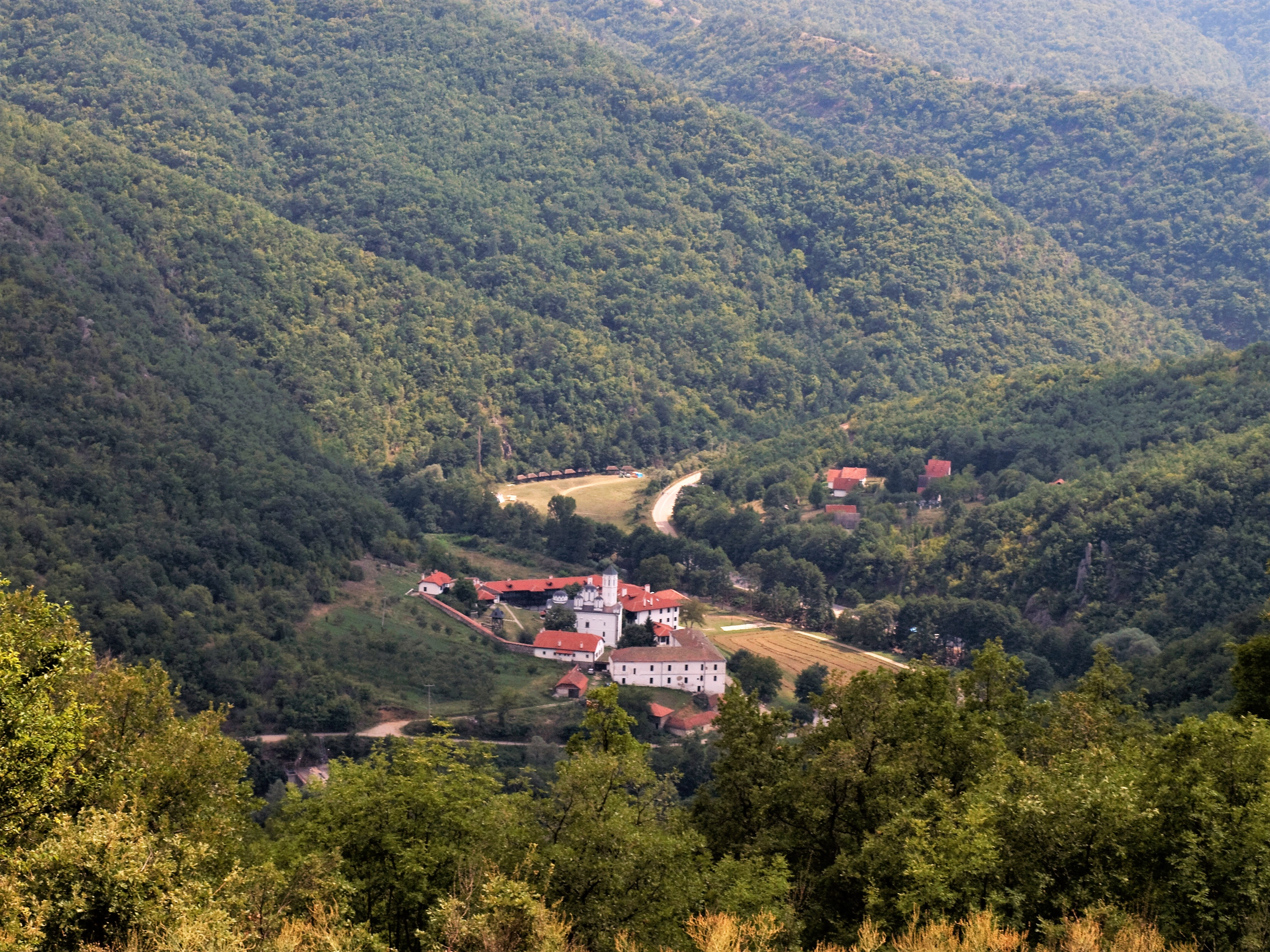
- The Prohor Pčinjski monastery

- Location within Serbia
- Coordinates: 42.3897°N 21.8889°E
- Country: Serbia
- District: Pčinja District
- Municipality: Bujanovac

Population (2002)
  - Total: 268
- Time zone: UTC+1 (CET)
  - Summer (DST): UTC+2 (CEST)

Klenike (Serbian Cyrillic: Кленике) is a village in the municipality of Bujanovac, Serbia. According to the 2002 census, the village has a population of 268 people.

The Serbian Orthodox monastery of Prohor Pčinjski, built in the 11th century, is located in the village.
