= Ljupčo Arsov =

Prime Minister of the Republic of Macedonia (1910–1986)

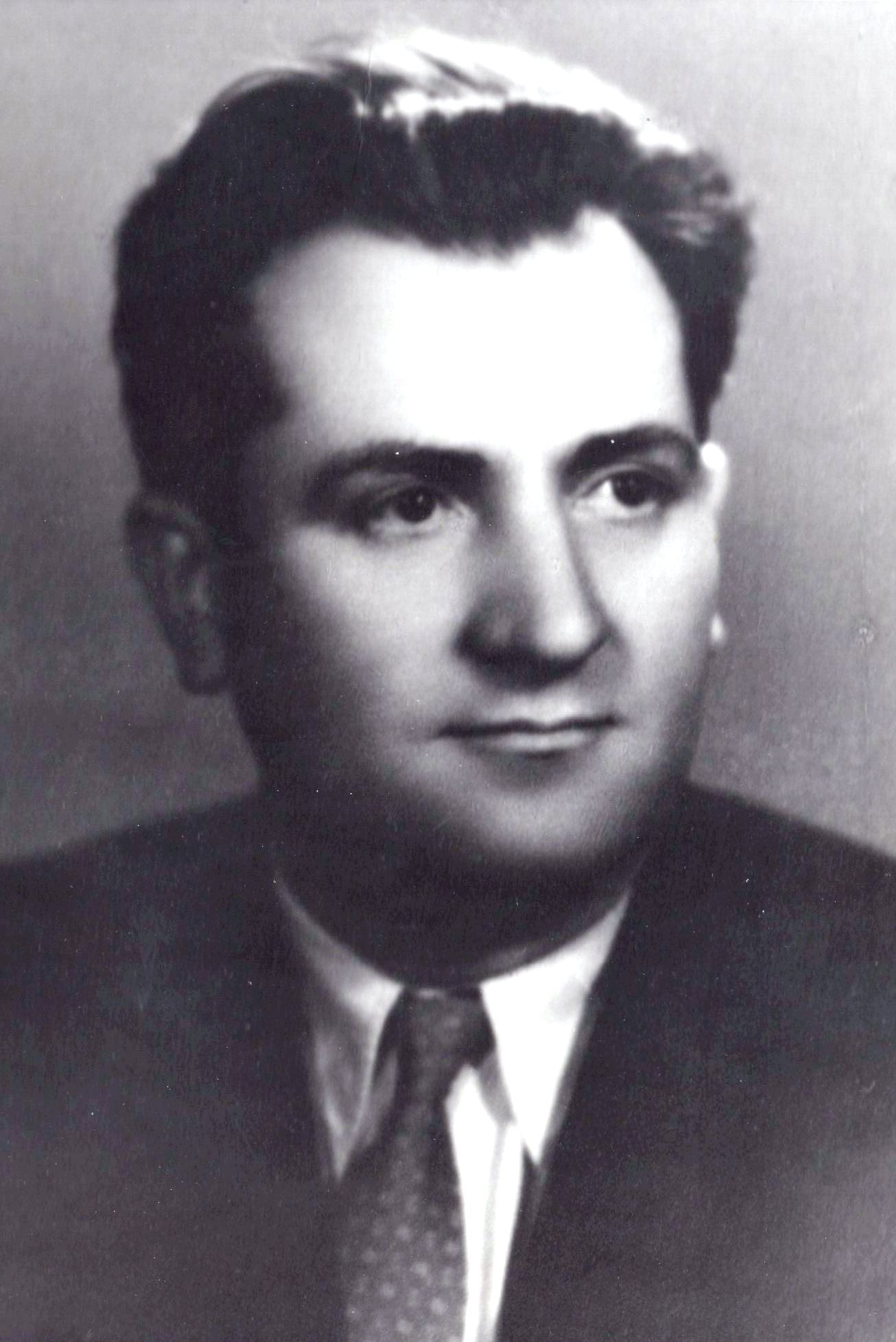

1st President of the Chamber of Nationalities of the Federal Assembly of Yugoslavia
- Preceded by: None (office established)
- Succeeded by: Vida Tomsić

2nd President of the Executive Council of the People's Republic of Macedonia
- In office 19 December 1953 – 26 June 1961
- Preceded by: Lazar Koliševski
- Succeeded by: Aleksandar Grličkov

Personal details
- Born: 19 May 1910 İştip, Kosovo Vilayet, Ottoman Empire
- Died: 18 November 1986 (aged 76) Skopje, SFR Yugoslavia
- Party: SDSM
- Spouse: Elena Arsova

Ljupčo Arsov (19 May 1910 – 18 November 1986) was a Macedonian communist politician. He was the Prime Minister of Macedonia from December 1953 to June 1961.

== Honours and awards ==
- Order of the People's Hero (1953).
