= Vrulja, Pljevlja =

Vrulja Вруља
- Village
- Location within Montenegro
- Country: Montenegro
- Municipality: Pljevlja

Population (2011)
  - Total: 131
- Time zone: UTC+1 (CET)
  - Summer (DST): UTC+2 (CEST)

Vrulja (Serbian Cyrillic: Вруља) is a village in the municipality of Pljevlja, Montenegro.

== Demographics ==
According to the 2003 census, the village had a population of 249 people.

According to the 2011 census, its population was 131.

Ethnicity in 2011
Ethnicity	Number	Percentage
Serbs	91	69.5%
Montenegrins	35	26.7%
other/undeclared	5	3.8%
Total	131	100%
