= Bloody Christmas (1945) =

1945 purging in SR Macedonia

The Bloody Christmas (Bulgarian: Кървав Божик, romanized: Karvav Bozhik; Macedonian: Крвав Божиќ, romanized: Krvav Božikj) was a campaign in which several hundred people with pro-Bulgarian orientation were killed as collaborationists by the Yugoslav communist authorities in the Socialist Republic of Macedonia in January 1945. Thousands of others who retained their pro-Bulgarian sympathies or views, suffered severe repression as a result. Many people with a pro-Bulgarian orientation or accused of having one were arrested and sentenced on fabricated charges. During the Cold War, the event was silenced by the communist authorities.

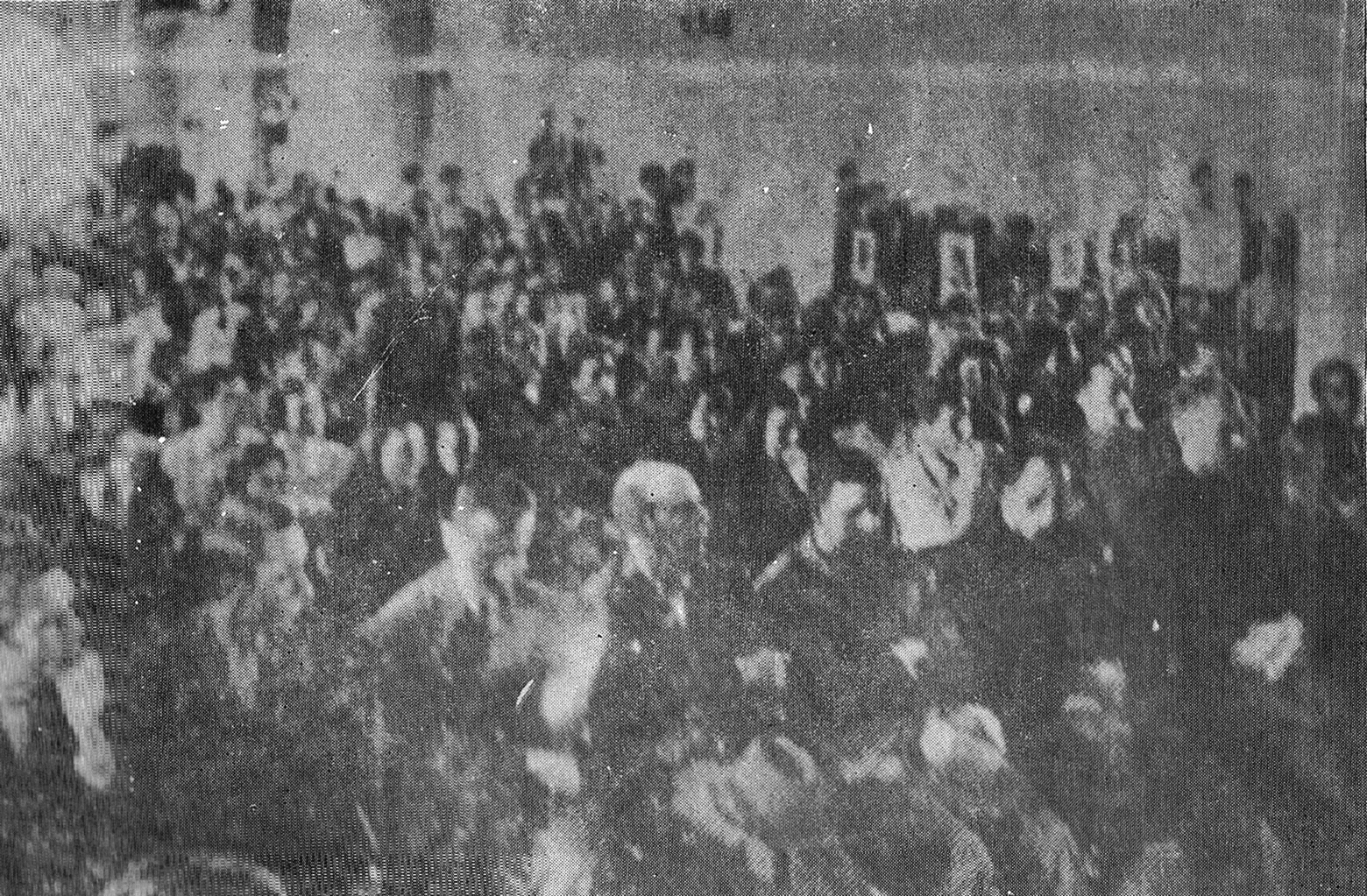
The trial of pro-Bulgarian collaborationists and Bulgarian officers and officials, among them are Dimitar Gyuzelov, Dimitar Chkatrov, Spiro Kitinchev and Dimitar Raev.

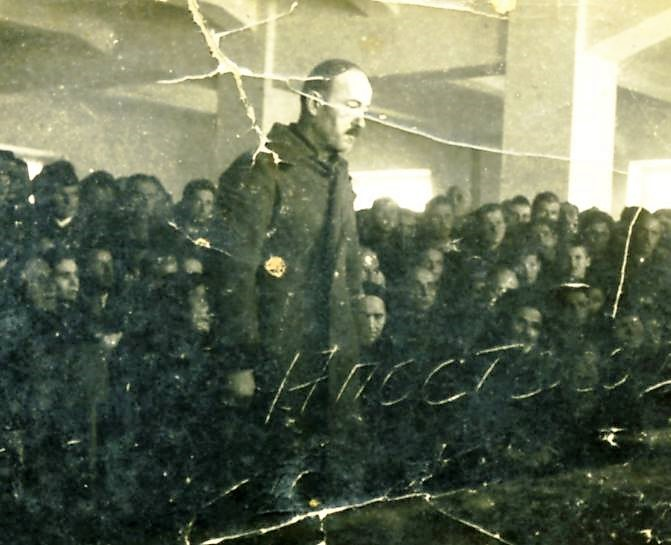
Bulgarian colonel Lyuben Apostolov was sentenced to death for the killing of 12 civilians in the village of Vataša in 1943.

== Development ==
Per Bulgarian sources, the new authorities in the Socialist Republic of Macedonia, were involved in retribution against people who did not support the formation of the new ethnic Macedonian identity. To wipe out the Bulgarophile sentiments of parts of the local population, the Yugoslav communists started a process of nation-building. Bulgarian sources put the number of dead "traitors" and "collaborationists" due to organized killings of Bulgarians during Bloody Christmas and afterwards at around 1,200. Per Croatian researcher Vladimir Žerjavić, the number of the massacred collaborationists in Yugoslav Macedonia after WWII reached 1,000. According to Bulgarian historian Dobrin Michev the idea was to weaken the Bulgarian intelligentsia in Macedonia, to eradicate the Bulgarian self-identification of parts of the population, and to speed-up the process of Macedonisation. At the end of 1944, a law was passed for the protection of the Macedonian national honour, which persecuted people with a Bulgarian identity, pro-Bulgarian views, collaborationists or those who wanted more independence from Yugoslavia. A special court was also set up between April and August 1945 to implement the law.

According to Bulgarian authors during the terror of January 1945, on the road between Lake Ohrid and Lake Prespa, and on the hills of Galičica mountain near the village of Oteševo and other villages, more Bulgarians were executed. Most of the bodies were disposed of in Lake Prespa. Nearly all inhabited places in Vardar Macedonia provided victims for the campaign. In several cities in Vardar Macedonia, where people's courts were set up, death sentences over citizens charged with "great-Bulgarian chauvinism" were issued. In Skopje, in 1945 alone, 18 trials were held with 226 defendants, 22 of whom were sentenced to death. In Štip in the same period, seven Bulgarians were sentenced to death. Ten Bulgarians were sentenced to death in Prilep and in Veles. In Bitola, nine were sentenced to death.

The central Communist Party of Yugoslavia (CPY) expressed discontent with these actions of the Communist Party of Macedonia (CPM), with an exchange of letters showing that the latter misunderstood the repressions to be greenlit by the former. The CPY struggled in these earlier years to assert itself over the affairs of the CPM, which was subject to considerable factionalism at the time. To make matters worse, the CPY's former representative in Macedonia with considerable understanding of the regional situation, Svetozar Vukmanović-Tempo, had been recalled earlier in November 1944 and replaced with the less knowledgeable Miha Marinko.

According to Bulgarian sources, between 1945 and 1946 over 4,700 Bulgarians were massacred or went missing. As a result of the purge, up to 100,000 people were deported, displaced, imprisoned, persecuted or sent to concentration camps in Yugoslavia. (Note: Additionally, some 100,000 people were imprisoned in the post-1944 period for violations of the law for the "protection of Macedonian national honor," and some 1,260 Bulgarian sympathizers were allegedly killed. (Troebst, 1997: 248-50, 255-57; 1994: 116-22; Poulton, 2000: 118-19). For more see: Roudometof, Victor (2002) Collective Memory, National Identity, and Ethnic Conflict: Greece, Bulgaria, and the Macedonian Question. Westport: Connecticut: Praeger. p.104. ISBN 0-275-97648-3) The bodies of 50 executed victims were exhumed near the village of Letevci on June and July 1996. In 2005, a scholarly conference was organized in Veles to commemorate the murder of more than fifty locals but they were portrayed as patriotic Macedonians wrongly accused of pro-Bulgarian sentiments.

Some Bulgarian researchers have questioned the high figures, noting that the assertion that these individuals were persecuted and killed solely on account of their Bulgarian national consciousness is deceptive. Bulgarian historian Stefan Detchev writes that "23,000 killed in Ohrid region and 150,000 sent to prisons are fantasies that don't even deserve a comment". He adds that "Many people from the elite who were convinced Bulgarians were brutally murdered. But there were others killed as well".

== See also ==
- Macedonian nationalism
- Bulgarians in North Macedonia

== Notes ==
Informational notes
