= Prohor Pčinjski Monastery =

Monastery in Serbia

Coordinates: 42°19′45″N 21°53′43″E

Prohor Pčinjski
- Прохор Пчињски
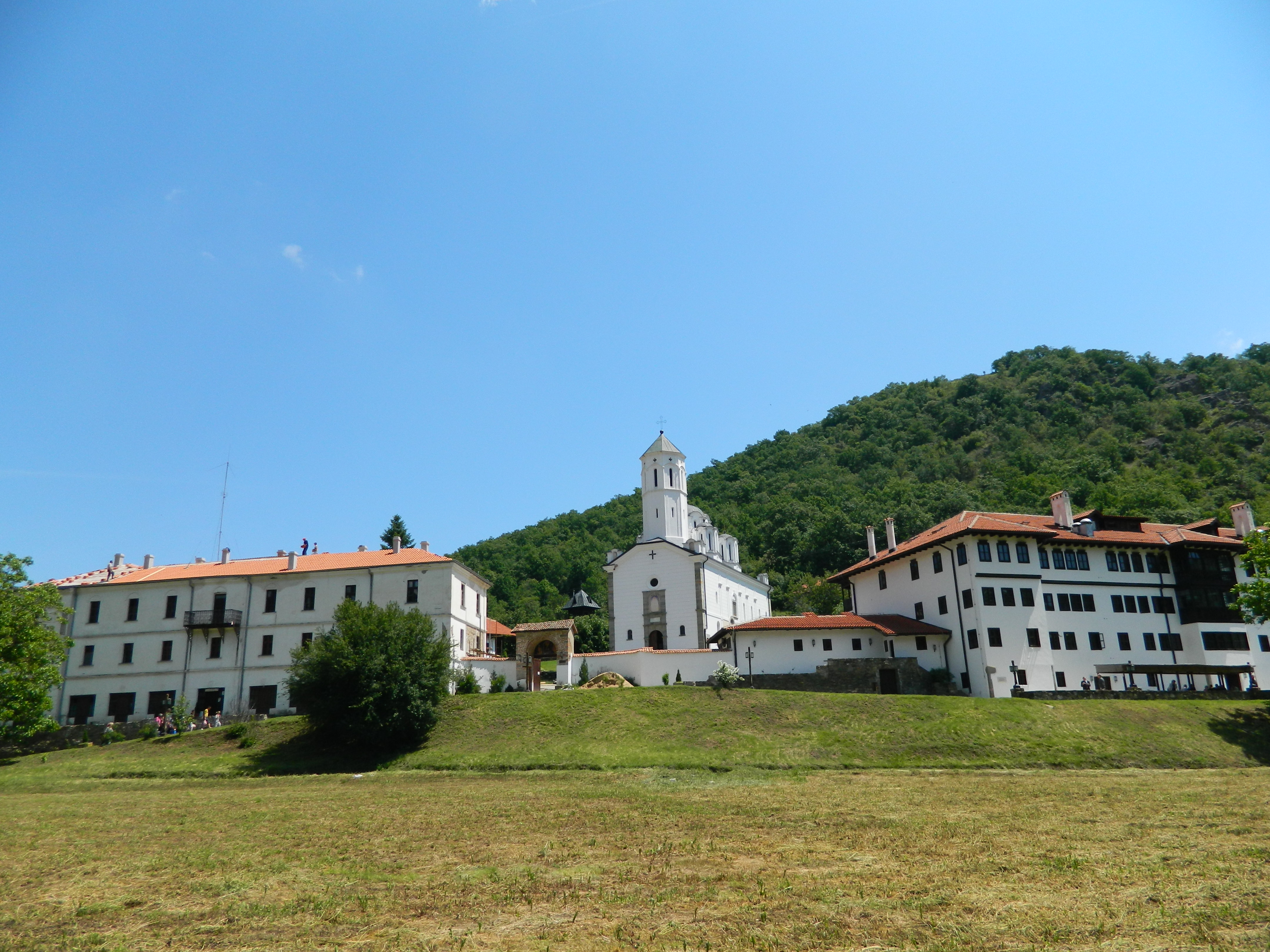
- View of the Prohor Pčinjski
- Interactive map of Prohor Pčinjski

Monastery information
- Full name: Monastery of Venerable Prohor of Pčinja
- Order: Serbian Orthodox
- Established: 11th century
- Dedication: Saint Prohor of Pčinja
- Diocese: Eparchy of Vranje

People
- Founder: Romanos IV Diogenes

Architecture
- Heritage designation: Monuments of Culture of Exceptional Importance
- Designated date: 1979

Site
- Location: Klenike, Bujanovac, Serbia

The Monastery of Venerable Prohor of Pčinja (Serbian: Манастир Преподобног Прохора Пчињског, romanized: Manastir Prepodobnog Prohora Pčinjskog), commonly known as Prohor Pčinjski (Serbian: Прохор Пчињски, romanized: Prohor Pčinjski) is an 11th-century Serbian Orthodox monastery in the deep south in Serbia, located in the village of Klenike, 30 km (19 mi) south of Vranje, near the border with North Macedonia. It is situated at the slopes of Mount Kozjak at the left side of the Pčinja River. The monastery was founded in the 11th century and is the second largest Serbian Orthodox monastery complex after Hilandar on Mount Athos in Greece.

== History ==
According to tradition, the monastery was founded 1067–1071 by the Byzantine emperor Romanus IV in honor of Saint Prohor of Pčinja, who prophesied that Romanus would become the emperor. The relics of Saint Prohor are located in the monastery. A major renovation of the monastery was undertaken in the early 14th century under King Milutin of Serbia when the frescoes were painted. After the Battle of Kosovo (1389) the monastery was destroyed by the Ottomans but was rebuilt later in the 14th century, and new frescoes were painted. There are reports of the monastery in the 17th and 18th centuries, but in 1817 it was plundered by Albanians and Turks and was abandoned. In the following years, the monastery was run by priests and prominent citizens of the nearby town of Vranje. In 1841, the monastery was burned with fire, along with a relic kept in it, the hand of St. Prohor Pčinjski. In the middle of the 19th century, new monastery buildings were built, in 1870 the famous icon painter Dičo Zograf reworked some of the murals in the church, and in 1899 it was expanded and painted. During the same period, only a few monks permanently resided here.

In 1913, King Peter I of Serbia financed construction of a new residential building for monastery monks (so called "King's residence"). The last renovation of the monastery happened in the 1990s. Two now residential buildings, a watermill and a mini hydro power plant were added since. The renovation of the King's residence started in 2013.

On 2 August 1944, the anniversary of the Ilinden uprising day, the first session of the Anti-fascist Assembly for the National Liberation of Macedonia (ASNOM) was held in the monastery. The Assembly declared a Macedonian state within Yugoslavia and proclaimed the Macedonian language as the official language of the state.

In 2010, an underground room from the Early Middle Ages was found in the yard near the monastery. Detailed archaeological examination has not been undertaken yet, because of lack of funds.

For the most of its history, Prohor Pčinjski was male monastery, except in 1987–1992 when it was female monastery. The monastery was declared a Monument of Culture of Exceptional Importance in 1979, and it is protected by the state.

Within the monastery, there is a theological school and iconography is taught there.

In 2014, part of the roof of the monastery was completely burnt down. In 2015 the state of Serbia, local community and voluntary contributions funds are gathered to rebuild it.

== See also ==
- List of Serbian Orthodox monasteries
