= President of the Supervisory Commission of the League of Communists of Yugoslavia =

President of the Supervisory Commission
- Emblems of the LCY

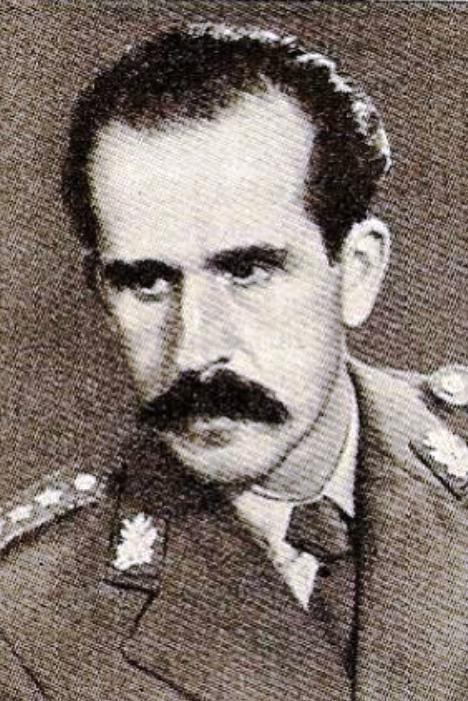
- First officeholder Otmar Kreačić; 29 July 1948 – 7 November 1952
- Seat: Palace of Socio-Political Organisations, Belgrade (1964–91); Marx and Engels Square, Belgrade (1945–1964)
- Appointer: Session of the Supervisory Commission
- Constituting instrument: Statute of the League of Communists of Yugoslavia
- Formation: 29 July 1948
- First holder: Otmar Kreačić
- Final holder: Pero Škrlin
- Abolished: 22 January 1990

The office of president of the Supervisory Commission of the League of Communists of Yugoslavia (LCY) was established on 29 July 1948 under the name chairman of the Central Auditing Commission. From 1948 until the 9th LCY Congress, held in 1969, the officeholder was elected by the Session of the Session of the LCY Central Committee. The 9th Congress amended the party statute, and transformed the Auditing Commission into the Supervisory Commission, and the chairmanship was renamed president.

== Officeholders ==
Chairs of the Supervisory Commission of the League of Communists of Yugoslavia
No.	Name	Took office	Left office	Tenure	Term	Birth	PM	Death	Branch	Ethnicity	Gender	Ref.
1	Otmar Kreačić	29 July 1948	7 November 1952	4 years, 101 days	5th (1948–52)	1913	1937	1992	Croatia	Croat	Male	
2	Mitar Bakić	7 November 1952	26 April 1958	5 years, 170 days	6th (1952–58)	1908	1932	1960	Montenegro	Montenegrin	Male	
3	Grga Jankez	26 April 1958	13 December 1964	6 years, 231 days	7th (1958–64)	1906	1926	1974	Croatia	Croat	Male	
4	Ilija Tepavac	13 December 1964	15 March 1969	4 years, 92 days	8th (1964–69)	1922	1941	?	Serbia	Serb	Male	
5	?	15 March 1969	30 May 1974	5 years, 76 days	9th (1969–74)	?	?	?	?	?	?	?
6	Angele Božinovski	30 May 1974	23 June 1978	4 years, 24 days	10th (1974–78)	1921	1945	?	Macedonia	Macedonian	Female	
7	Paško Romac	23 June 1978	29 June 1982	4 years, 6 days	11th (1982–86)	1916	1937	1982	Serbia	Serb	Male	
8	Anica Kuhar	29 June 1982	28 June 1986	3 years, 364 days	12th (1986–90)	1922	1941	2018	Slovenia	Slovene	Female	
9	Pero Škrlin	28 June 1986	22 January 1990	3 years, 208 days	13th (1986–90)	1929	1949	?	Croatia	Croat	Male	
