= Berislavci =

Berislavci Бериславци
- Village
- Location within Montenegro
- Country: Montenegro
- Municipality: Podgorica

Population (2011)
  - Total: 496
- Time zone: UTC+1 (CET)
  - Summer (DST): UTC+2 (CEST)

Berislavci (Serbian Cyrillic: Бериславци) is a village in the new Zeta Municipality of Montenegro. Until 2022, it was part of Podgorica Municipality.

== Demographics ==
According to the 2011 census, its population was 496.

Ethnicity in 2011
Ethnicity	Number	Percentage
Montenegrins	392	79.0%
Serbs	68	13.7%
other/undeclared	36	7.3%
Total	496	100%

== Notable residents ==
- Mitar Bakić
