= Central Auditing Commission of the 7th Congress of the League of Communists of Yugoslavia =

7th Central Auditing Commission
- Emblem of the League of Communists of Yugoslavia

26 April 1958 – 13 December 1964 (6 years, 231 days) Overview
- Type: Auditing organ
- Election: 7th Congress

Members
- Total: 20 members
- Newcomers: 11 members (7th)
- Old: 9 members (6th)
- Reelected: None (8th)

This electoral term of the Central Auditing Commission was elected by the 7th Congress of the League of Communists of Yugoslavia in 1958, and was in session until the gathering of the 8th Congress in 1964.

== Composition ==
Members of the Central Auditing Commission of the 7th Congress of the League of Communists of Yugoslavia
| Name | 6th | 8th | Birth | PM | Death | Branch | Nationality | Gender | Ref. |
|---|---|---|---|---|---|---|---|---|---|
| Milutin Baltić | Old | Not | 1920 | 1940 | 2013 | Croatia | Serb | Male | |
| Savo Brković | Old | Not | 1906 | 1924 | 1991 | Montenegro | Montenegrin | Male | |
| Tome Bukleski | New | Not | 1921 | 1941 | 2018 | Macedonia | Macedonian | Male | |
| Vančo Burzevski | Old | Not | 1916 | 1941 | 2007 | Macedonia | Macedonian | Male | |
| Bosa Cvetić | New | Not | 1912 | 1935 | 1975 | Serbia | Serb | Female | |
| Stjepan Debeljak | New | Not | 1908 | 1932 | 1968 | Croatia | Croat | Male | |
| Blažo Đuričić | New | Not | 1914 | 1941 | 1991 | Bosnia-Herzegovina | Serb | Male | |
| Milinko Đurović | Old | Not | 1910 | 1936 | 1988 | Montenegro | Montenegrin | Male | |
| Dimitrije Georgijević | Old | Not | 1884 | 1919 | 1959 | Serbia | Serb | Male | |
| Grga Jankez | Old | Not | 1906 | 1926 | 1974 | Croatia | Croat | Male | |
| Hajrudin Kapetanović | Old | Not | 1917 | 1940 | 1988 | Bosnia-Herzegovina | Muslim | Male | |
| Jovo Kapičić | Old | Not | 1919 | 1936 | 2013 | Serbia | Serb | Male | |
| Dušanka Kovačević | Old | Not | 1917 | 1940 | 1985 | Bosnia-Herzegovina | Serb | Female | |
| Leo Mates | Old | Not | 1911 | 1933 | 1991 | Croatia | Jew | Male | |
| Milosav Milosavljević | Old | Not | 1911 | 1934 | 1986 | Serbia | Serb | Male | |
| Mara Naceva | Old | Not | 1920 | 1939 | 2013 | Macedonia | Macedonian | Female | |
| France Popit | New | Not | 1921 | 1940 | 2013 | Slovenia | Slovene | Male | |
| Petar Relić | New | Not | 1913 | 1940 | 1990 | Serbia | Serb | Male | |
| Mitja Ribičič | New | Not | 1919 | 1941 | 2013 | Slovenia | Slovene | Male | |
| Ante Roje | Old | Not | 1914 | 1939 | 1982 | Croatia | Croat | Male | |
| Janko Rudolf | Old | Not | 1914 | 1941 | 1997 | Slovenia | Slovene | Male | |
| Kolj Široka | New | Not | 1922 | 1941 | 1994 | Serbia | Albanian | Male | |

== Bibliography ==
- Bechev, Dimitar (2013). Historical Dictionary of the Republic of Macedonia. Rowman & Littlefield Publishers. ISBN 9781538119617.
- Djukanović, Bojka (2023). Historical Dictionary of Montenegro. Rowman & Littlefield Publishers. ISBN 9781538139158.
- Hetemi, Atdhe (2020). Student Movements for the Republic of Kosovo: 1968, 1981 and 1997. Springer International Publishing.
- Janković, Slavko, ed. (1957). Ko je ko u Jugoslaviji: biografski podaci o jugoslovenskim savremenicima [Who's Who in Yugoslavia: Biographical Information About Yugoslav Contemporaries] (in Serbo-Croatian). Vol. 3. Izd. "Sedme sile".
- Joksimović, Milan; Rajović, Radošin (1970). Jugoslovenski savremenici: Ko je ko u Jugoslaviji [Yugoslav Contemporaries: Who's Who in Yugoslavia] (in Serbo-Croatian). Hronometar.
- Marković, Dragan; Kržavac, Savo (1985). Zašto su smenjivani [Why Were They Replaced?] (in Serbo-Croatian). Partizanska knjiga. ISBN 978-3-030-54951-0.
- Neal, Fred Warner (March 1957). "The Communist Party in Yugoslavia". The American Political Science Review. 1 (51): 88–111. doi:10.2307/1951773. JSTOR 1951773.
- Neal, Fred Warner (1958). Titoism in Action: The Reforms in Yugoslavia After 1948. University of California Press. ISBN 978-0-520-35044-1.
- Rajak, Svetozar (2011). Yugoslavia and the Soviet Union in the Early Cold War: Reconciliation, comradeship, confrontation, 1953–1957. Routledge. ISBN 978-0-415-38074-4.
- Rajović, Radošin, ed. (1970). Jugoslovenski savremenici: Ko je ko u Jugoslaviji [Yugoslav Contemporaries: Who's Who in Yugoslavia] (in Serbo-Croatian). Hronometar.
- Rusinow, Dennison (1978). The Yugoslav Experiment 1948–1974. University of California Press. ISBN 0-520-03730-8.
- Nešović, Slobodan (1981). Stvaranje nove Jugoslavije: 1941–1945 [Creation of the New Yugoslavia: 1941–1945] (in Serbo-Croatian). Sarajevo: Mladost. OCLC 444838775.
- Popović, Nikola (1977). Jugosloveni u oktobarskoj revoluciji: zbornik sećanja Jugoslovena ućesnika oktobarske revolucije i građanskog rata u Rusiji 1917–1921 [Yugoslavs in the October Revolution: A Collection of Memories of Yugoslav Participants in the October Revolution and the Russian Civil War 1917–1921] (in Serbo-Croatian). Institut za savremenu istoriju.
- Staff writer, ed. (1982). Politički i poslovni imenik [Political and Business Directory] (in Serbo-Croatian). Vol. 3. Tanjug.
- Staff writer, ed. (1948). Odluke V. kongresa Komunističke Partije Jugoslavije [Decisions of the Fifth Congress of the Communist Party of Yugoslavia] (in Serbo-Croatian). Kultura.
- Staff writer, ed. (1953). VI kongres Komunističke partije Jugoslavije: 2-7 novembra 1952: stenografske beleške [VI Congress of the Communist Party of Yugoslavia] (in Serbo-Croatian). Kultura.
- Staff writer, ed. (1965). VIII Kongres Saveza Komunista Jugoslavije Beograd, 7–13. decembra 1964.: stenog̈rafske beleške [VIII Congress of the Union of Communists of Yugoslavia Belgrade, 7–13 December 1964: shorthand notes] (in Serbo-Croatian). Vol. 3. Kultura.
- Staff writer, ed. (1966). Svjetski almanah [World Almanac] (in Serbo-Croatian). Vol. 4. Novinsko izdavačko poduzeće.
- Lewytzkyj, Borys; Stroynowski, Juliusz, eds. (1978). Who's Who in the Socialist Countries. K. G. Saur Verlag. ISBN 3-7940-3017-6.
- Stroynowski, Juliusz, ed. (1989a). Who's Who in the Socialist Countries of Europe: A–H. K. G. Saur Verlag. ISBN 3-598-10719-6.
- Stroynowski, Juliusz, ed. (1989b). Who's Who in the Socialist Countries of Europe: I–O. K. G. Saur Verlag. ISBN 3-598-10719-6.
- Stroynowski, Juliusz, ed. (1989c). Who's Who in the Socialist Countries of Europe: P–Z. K. G. Saur Verlag. ISBN 3-598-10719-6.
- Zalar, Charles, ed. (1961). Yugoslav Communism: A Critical Study. United States Government Printing Office. Archived from the original on 11 June 2023.
- Živkovíc, Dusan; Apostolski, Mihailo; Kačavenda, Petar, eds. (1982). National Heroes of Yugoslavia [Narodni heroji Jugoslavije] (in Serbo-Croatian). Narodna knjiga.
