= Stefan Kapičić =

Serbian actor (born 1978)

- Стефан Капичић
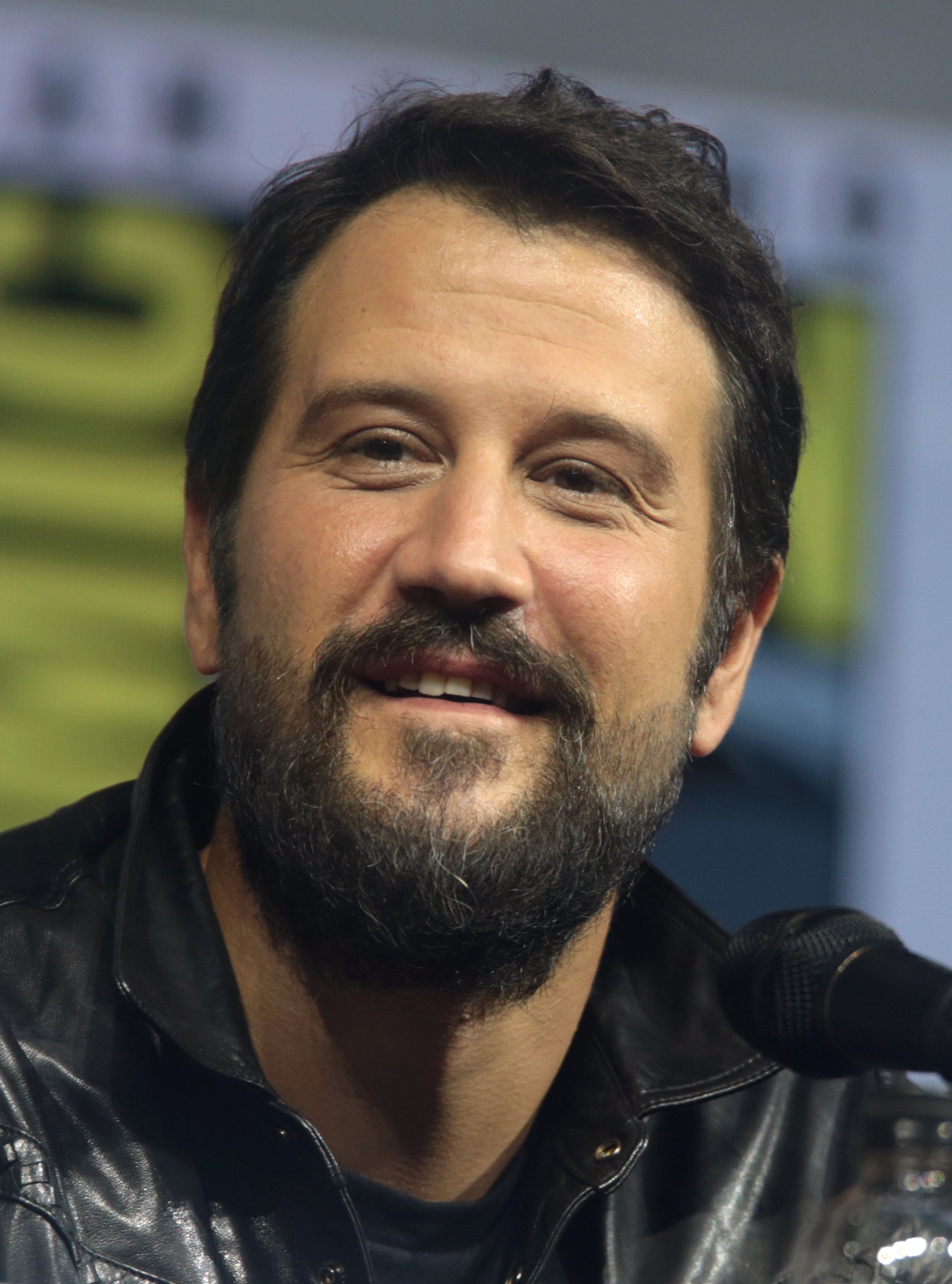
- Kapičić at the 2018 San Diego Comic-Con
- Born: 1 December 1978 (age 47); Cologne, West Germany
- Education: University of Belgrade
- Occupation: Actor
- Years active: 2002–present
- Height: 6 ft 4 in (1.93 m)
- Spouse: Ivana Horvat (m. 2017)
- Children: 2
- Father: Dragan Kapičić
- Relatives: Jovo Kapičić (grandfather)

Stefan Kapičić (Serbian Cyrillic: Стефан Капичић; born 1 December 1978) is a Serbian actor best known for his role voicing Colossus in the Deadpool franchise. He is also one of three members of the Council for Film Industry of Montenegro.

== Early life ==
Kapičić was born 1 December 1978 in Cologne, West Germany, the son of Slobodanka "Beba" Žugić, a Montenegrin actress, and Dragan Kapičić, a retired Serbian basketball player. His father played for Saturn Köln during that time. At three years of age the family returned to SFR Yugoslavia. His grandfather Jovo Kapičić bought him his first comic book when he was six years old, which sparked what he called an "ongoing love" in a 2015 interview about his role in Deadpool. He studied acting at the Faculty of Dramatic Arts in Belgrade. He speaks Serbian, English, German and Russian.

== Career ==
Kapičić played the role of his own father in the 2015 film Bićemo prvaci sveta (We Will Be World Champions) about the Yugoslavian national basketball team which won the 1970 FIBA World Championship.

By 2015, Kapičić had accumulated more than 80 roles in television, film, and theater. He made it to the second round of a secret casting process for the X-Man Colossus in the superhero film Deadpool, learning what the production was only after he passed that round. Working with first-time director Tim Miller in Los Angeles, Kapičić did 120 takes during his third call of auditions, stretching the session an additional eight hours beyond its intended four-hour duration, before flying back to Dubrovnik, Croatia to perform Romeo and Juliet. Kapičić, a self-described "comic book geek" who considered Deadpool one of his favorite characters, was especially delighted when he learned he won the role, taking over from Daniel Cudmore, who had played the role in the X-Men films. Kapičić was selected because Miller wanted his version of Colossus, who is Russian in the comics, to have a Russian accent. The 6-foot-4 Kapičić portrayed the 7-and-a-half-foot tall character through a combination of voice work and motion capture, completing filming in mid-December 2015, eight weeks before the film's 12 February 2016 release date.

In 2023, he appeared as Olgaren in The Last Voyage of the Demeter.

== Personal life ==
In December 2015, Kapičić became engaged to Croatian actress Ivana Horvat. They were married in 2017.

== Filmography ==
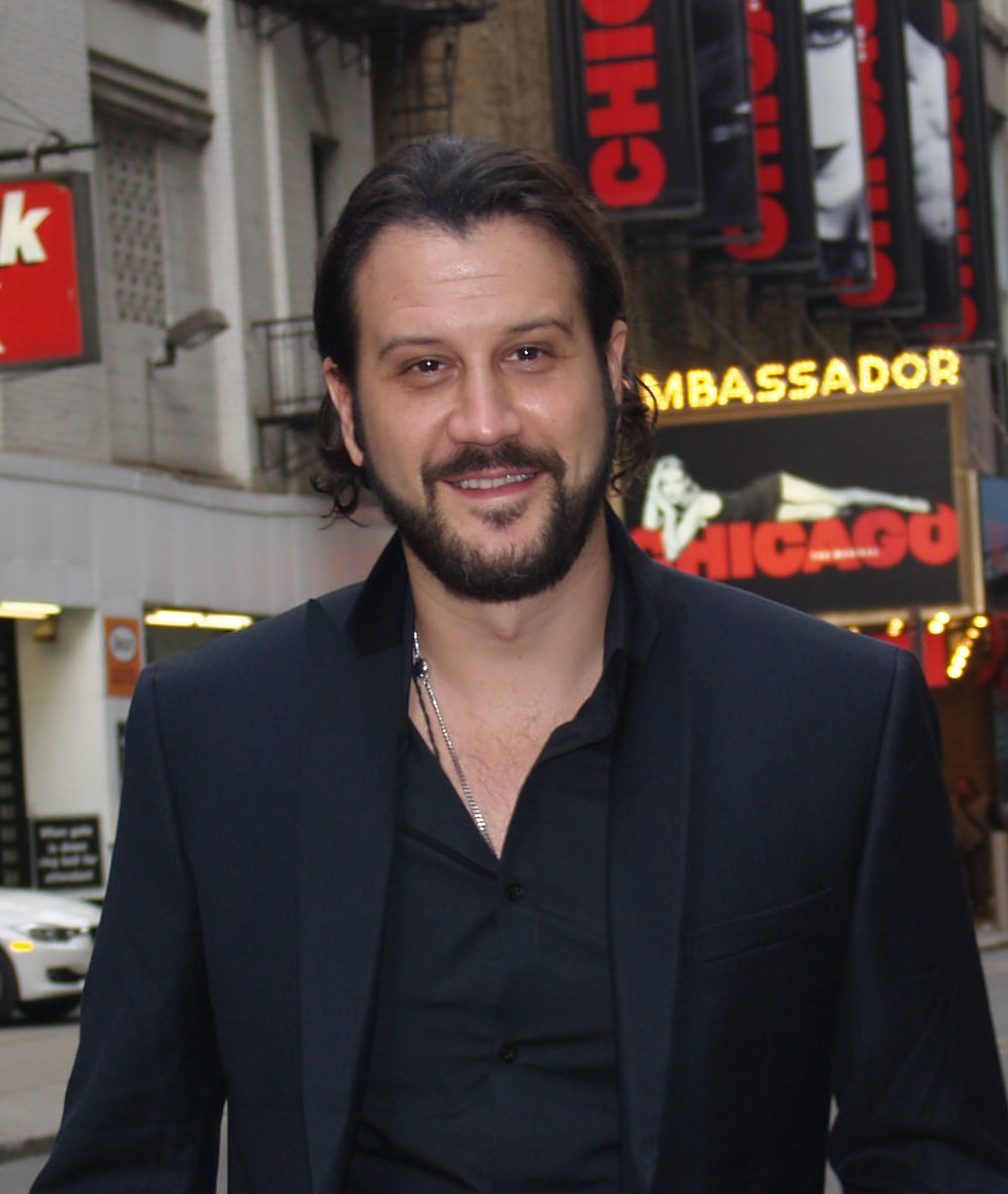
Stefan Kapičić at the Mayfair Hotel in Manhattan's Theater District in 2016

=== Film ===
Year	Film	Role	Notes
2002	Kordon		
2003	Citravita	Policeman in a Batman shirt	Short
2003	Skoro sasvim obična priča	Bane Leskovac	
2004	Slobodan pad	Nikola	Short
2004	Ulični hodač		
2004	O štetnosti duvana	Ahmed Crni Arapin	
2006	Ne skreći sa staze	Gej Deda Mraz	
2008	Čarlston za Ognjenku	Arsa 'Kralj čarlstona'	
2008	The Brothers Bloom	German Bar Owner	
2012	Big Miracle	Yuri	
2012	Larin izbor: Izgubljeni princ	Nikša Ivanov	
2013	Hitac	Crni	
2015	Bićemo prvaci sveta	Dragan Kapičić	
2016	Deadpool	Colossus	Voice and facial performance
2018	Deadpool 2	Colossus	Voice and facial performance
2023	The Last Voyage of the Demeter	Olgaren	
2023	Slotherhouse	Oliver	
2024	Deadpool & Wolverine	Colossus	Voice and facial performance
2026	Coyote vs. Acme	TBA	

=== Television ===
Year	Title	Role	Notes
2006–2007	Obični ljudi	Igor Nikolić	111 episodes
2008	Vratiće se rode	Dizajner Mitrović Dečanski	
2008	The Unit	Dragan	Episode: "Sex Trade"
2008	Numb3rs	Lee Hagopian	Episode: "Scan Man"
2010	24	Davros' Operative	Episode: "Day 8: 4:00 p.m. – 5:00 p.m."
2011	The Event	Dimitri Jelavitch	Episode: "Strain"
2011–2013	Larin izbor	Nikša Ivanov	251 episodes
2013	Stella	Zac	Guest star
2013–2014	Zora dubrovačka	Rocco Sorgo	48 episodes
2015	Andrija i Anđelka	Tonči	
2016	Prvaci sveta	Dragan Kapičić	
2018	Counterpart	Lieber	
2018–2022	Better Call Saul	Casper	6 episodes
2019	Love, Death & Robots	Lt. Nikolai Zakharov (voice)	Episode: "The Secret War"
2022	Chicago Med	Nikola Corluka	Season 7 Episode 22 "End of the day, anything can happen"

=== Serbian dubs ===
Year	Film	Role	Notes
2004	Pokémon	James	Seasons 1–5
2006	Garfield: A Tail of Two Kitties	Winston	
2006	Open Season	Shaw	
2006	Return to Never Land	Captain Hook	
2015	Animal Kingdom: Let's Go Ape	Édouard	
2015	Inside Out	Riley's Father	
2016	The Good Dinosaur	Poppa Henry	

=== Video games ===
Year	Title	Voice role	Notes
2019	Call of Duty: Modern Warfare	Nikolai, J-12	
2022	Call of Duty: Modern Warfare II	Nikolai	
2023	Call of Duty: Modern Warfare III	Nikolai	
2026	Grand Theft Auto VI	The Local Population	
