= Supervisory Commission of the 9th Congress of the League of Communists of Yugoslavia =

9th Supervisory Commission
- Emblem of the League of Communists of Yugoslavia

15 March 1969 – 30 May 1974 (5 years, 76 days) Overview
- Type: Auditing organ
- Election: 9th Congress

Members
- Total: 7 members
- Newcomers: 6 members (9th)
- Old: 1 member
- Reelected: 1 (10th)

This electoral term of the Supervisory Commission was elected by the 9th Congress of the League of Communists of Yugoslavia in 1969, and was in session until the convocation of the 10th Congress in 1974.

== Composition ==
=== Members ===
Members of the Supervisory Commission of the 9th Congress of the League of Communists of Yugoslavia
Name	8th	10th	Birth	PM	Death	Branch	Nationality	Gender	Ref.
Adolf Arigler	New	Not	1921	1941	1999	Slovenia	Slovene	Male	
Rajko Đuričanin	New	Not	1930	1948	?	Montenegro	Montenegrin	Male	
Zijo Filipović	New	Not	1924	1945	1992	Bosnia-Herzegovina	Muslim	Male	
Radojka Katić	Old	Elected	1922	1941	?	Croatia	Croat	Female	
Živorad Mišić	New	Not	1923	1942	?	Serbia	Serb	Male	
Kiro Serafimov	New	Not	1932	?	?	Macedonia	Macedonian	Male	
Ivan Valentak	New	Not	1926	1946	?	Croatia	Croat	Male	

=== Ex-officio ===
Ex-Officio Members of the Supervisory Commission of the 9th Congress of the League of Communists of Yugoslavia
Name	8th	10th	Birth	PM	Death	Branch	Nationality	Gender	Ref.
Dušan Cvijetić	New	Not	1931	1948	?	Bosnia-Herzegovina	Serb	Male	
Živko Jovanovski	New	Not	1923	?	2017	Yugoslav People's Army	Macedonian	Male	
Krešimir Piškulić	New	Not	?	?	?	Croatia	Croat	Male	
Nikola Popovski	New	Not	1924	1944	?	Macedonia	Macedonian	Male	
Petar Vučurović	New	Not	?	?	?	Montenegro	Montenegrin	Male	
Slavoljub Rašković	New	Not	1921	1944	?	Serbia	Serb	Male	
Lojzka Stropnik	New	Not	1921	1945	2009	Slovenia	Slovene	Female	

== Bibliography ==
- Rajović, Radošin (1970). Jugoslovenski savremenici: Ko je ko u Jugoslaviji [Yugoslav Contemporaries: Who's Who in Yugoslavia] (in Serbo-Croatian). Hronometar.
- Martinović, Savo (1970). Deveti kongres Saveza komunista Jugoslavije, Beograd, 11-13. III.1969 [Ninth Congress of the League of Communists of Yugoslavia, Belgrade, 11–13. III 1969] (in Serbo-Croatian). Komunist.
- Opačić, Nine (1968). Društveno-političke zajednice: Socijalističke republike i autonomme pokrajine [Socio-Political Communities: Socialist Republics and Autonomous Provinces] (in Serbo-Croatian). Međunarodna štampa-Interpress.
- Staff writer, ed. (1969). Peti kongres Saveza komunista Bosne i Hercegovine [Fifth Congress of the Union of Communists of Bosnia and Herzegovina: Sarajevo, 9-11. January 1969. The book was prepared by: Pozderac Hamdija] (in Serbo-Croatian). Vol. 3. Central Committee of the League of Communists of Bosnia and Herzegovina.
