= Supervisory Commission of the 12th Congress of the League of Communists of Yugoslavia =

12th Supervisory Commission
- Emblem of the League of Communists of Yugoslavia

29 June 1982 – 25 June 1986 (3 years, 361 days) Overview
- Type: Auditing organ
- Election: 12th Congress

Members
- Total: 15 members
- Newcomers: 14 members (12th)
- Old: 1 member (11th)
- Reelected: 2 members (13th)

This electoral term of the Supervisory Commission was elected by the 12th Congress of the League of Communists of Yugoslavia in 1982, and was in session until the convocation of the 13th Congress in 1986.

== Composition ==
=== Members ===
Members of the Supervisory Commission of the 12th Congress of the League of Communists of Yugoslavia
Name	11th	13th	Birth	PM	Death	Branch	Nationality	Gender	Ref.
Anica Kuhar	New	Elected	1922	1942	2018	Slovenia	Slovene	Female	
Nevena Mileva	New	Not	1932	1949	?	Macedonia	Macedonian	Female	
Srećko Nedeljković	Old	Not	1917	1940	?	Serbia	Serb	Male	
Zvonimir Nizić	New	Not	1953	1970	?	Bosnia-Herzegovina	Croat	Male	
Milica Obradović	New	Not	1927	1949	2017	Croatia	Croat	Female	
Biserka Prlja-Kecojević	New	Not	1940	1958	?	Montenegro	Montenegrin	Female	

=== Ex-officio ===
Ex-Officio Members of the Supervisory Commission of the 12th Congress of the League of Communists of Yugoslavia
Name	11th	13th	Birth	PM	Death	Branch	Nationality	Gender	Ref.
Vedad Hadžiosmanović	New	Not	1947	1966	?	Bosnia-Herzegovina	Muslim	Male	
Magdica Hranj	New	Not	1939	1958	?	Croatia	Croat	Female	
Živorad Jakovljević	New	Elected	1926	1945	?	Serbia	Serb	Male	
Enver Jusufi	New	Not	1927	1947	?	Kosovo	Albanian	Male	
Dušan Marković	New	Not	1925	1946	?	Montenegro	Montenegrin	Male	
Nikola Noveski	New	Not	1927	1948	?	Macedonia	Macedonian	Male	
Mićo Šaulić	New	Not	1929	1947	1997	Yugoslav People's Army	Montenegrin	Male	
Jože Simšič	New	Not	1927	1947	2018	Slovenia	Slovene	Male	
Dragica Vojnović	New	Not	1922	1945	?	Vojvodina	Serb	Female	

== Bibliography ==
=== Books ===
- Rajović, Radošin (1970). Jugoslovenski savremenici: Ko je ko u Jugoslaviji [Yugoslav Contemporaries: Who's Who in Yugoslavia] (in Serbo-Croatian). Hronometar.
- Martinović, Savo (1970). Deveti kongres Saveza komunista Jugoslavije, Beograd, 11-13. III.1969 [Ninth Congress of the League of Communists of Yugoslavia, Belgrade, 11–13. III 1969] (in Serbo-Croatian). Komunist.
- Opačić, Nine (1968). Društveno-političke zajednice: Socijalističke republike i autonomme pokrajine [Socio-Political Communities: Socialist Republics and Autonomous Provinces] (in Serbo-Croatian). Međunarodna štampa-Interpress.
- Staff writer, ed. (1953). VI kongres Komunističke partije Jugoslavije: 2-7 novembra 1952: stenografske beleške [VI Congress of the Communist Party of Yugoslavia] (in Serbo-Croatian). Kultura.

=== Newspaper ===
- Staff writer (30 June 1982). "Централни комитет Савеза комуниста Југославије" [Central Committee of the League of Communists of Yugoslavia]. Borba (in Serbo-Croatian). Socialist Alliance of Working People: 6–7. Archived from the original on 14 January 2025.
