= Supervisory Commission of the 10th Congress of the League of Communists of Yugoslavia =

10th Supervisory Commission
- Emblem of the League of Communists of Yugoslavia

30 May 1974 – 23 June 1978 (4 years, 24 days) Overview
- Type: Auditing organ
- Election: 10th Congress

Members
- Total: 15 members
- Newcomers: 4 members (9th)
- Old: 1 member
- Reelected: 4 (11th)

This electoral term of the Supervisory Commission was elected by the 10th Congress of the League of Communists of Yugoslavia in 1974, and was in session until the convocation of the 11th Congress in 1978.

== Composition ==
Members of the Supervisory Commission of the 10th Congress of the League of Communists of Yugoslavia
Name	9th	11th	Birth	PM	Death	Branch	Nationality	Gender	Ref.
Angele Bozinovski	New	Not	1921	1945	?	Macedonia	Macedonian	Male	
Franc Bukovinski	New	Not	?	?	?	Slovenia	Slovene	Male	
Desa Đorđević	New	Not	?	?	?	Kosovo	Serb	Female	
Živko Jovanovski	New	Not	?	?	?	Yugoslav People's Army	Macedonian	Male	
Stjepan Jureković	New	Not	1921	1940	?	Croatia	Croat	Male	
Radojka Katić	Old	Elected	1922	1941	?	Croatia	Croat	Female	
Milan Keča	New	Not	1928	1963	?	Bosnia-Herzegovina	Muslim	Male	
Đorđe Matić	New	Not	1917	1939	?	Serbia	Serb	Male	
Srećko Nedeljković	New	Elected	1917	1940	?	Serbia	Serb	Male	
Mehmed Nurkanović	New	Not	?	?	?	Bosnia-Herzegovina	Muslim	Male	
Nikola Popovski	New	Elected	1924	1944	?	Macedonia	Macedonian	Male	
Damjan Šećković	New	Not	?	?	?	Montenegro	Montenegrin	Male	
Vladimir Sekulić	New	Not	1932	1947	?	Montenegro	Montenegrin	Male	
Lojzka Stropnik	Old	Elected	1921	1941	2009	Slovenia	Slovene	Female	
Maniša Vojvodić	New	Not	?	?	?	Vojvodina	Serb	Male	

== Bibliography ==
- Rajović, Radošin (1970). Jugoslovenski savremenici: Ko je ko u Jugoslaviji [Yugoslav Contemporaries: Who's Who in Yugoslavia] (in Serbo-Croatian). Hronometar.
- Martinović, Savo (1970). Deveti kongres Saveza komunista Jugoslavije, Beograd, 11-13. III.1969 [Ninth Congress of the League of Communists of Yugoslavia, Belgrade, 11–13. III 1969] (in Serbo-Croatian). Komunist.
- Opačić, Nine (1968). Društveno-političke zajednice: Socijalističke republike i autonomme pokrajine [Socio-Political Communities: Socialist Republics and Autonomous Provinces] (in Serbo-Croatian). Međunarodna štampa-Interpress.
- Staff writer, ed. (1969). Peti kongres Saveza komunista Bosne i Hercegovine [Fifth Congress of the Union of Communists of Bosnia and Herzegovina: Sarajevo, 9-11. January 1969. The book was prepared by: Pozderac Hamdija] (in Serbo-Croatian). Vol. 3. Central Committee of the League of Communists of Bosnia and Herzegovina.
