= Supervisory Commission of the 11th Congress of the League of Communists of Yugoslavia =

11th Supervisory Commission
- Emblem of the League of Communists of Yugoslavia

23 June 1978 – 26 June 1982 (4 years, 3 days) Overview
- Type: Auditing organ
- Election: 11th Congress

Members
- Total: 15 members
- Newcomers: 11 members (11th)
- Old: 4 member (10th)
- Reelected: 1 (12th)

This electoral term of the Supervisory Commission was elected by the 11th Congress of the League of Communists of Yugoslavia in 1978, and was in session until the convocation of the 12th Congress in 1982.

== Composition ==
=== Members ===
Members of the Supervisory Commission of the 11th Congress of the League of Communists of Yugoslavia
Name	10th	12th	Birth	PM	Death	Branch	Nationality	Gender	Ref.
Todor Baković	New	Not	1936	1957	2016	Montenegro	Montenegrin	Male	
Radojka Katić	Old	Not	1922	1941	?	Croatia	Croat	Female	
Nikola Popovski	Old	Not	1924	1944	?	Macedonia	Macedonian	Male	
Živko Radišić	New	Not	1937	1955	2021	Bosnia-Herzegovina	Serb	Male	
Paško Romac	New	Not	1916	1937	1982	Serbia	Yugoslav	Male	
Lojzka Stropnik	Old	Not	1921	1945	2009	Slovenia	Slovene	Female	

=== Ex-officio ===
Ex-Officio Members of the Supervisory Commission of the 11th Congress of the League of Communists of Yugoslavia
Name	10th	12th	Birth	PM	Death	Branch	Nationality	Gender	Ref.
Džavid Begovski	New	Not	1919	1948	?	Macedonia	Turk	Male	
Humbert Gačnik	New	Not	1918	1943	2003	Slovenia	Slovene	Male	
Stjepan Jožinec	New	Not	1931	1958	?	Croatia	Croat	Male	
Srećko Nedeljković	Old	Elected	1917	1940	?	Serbia	Serb	Male	
Lazar Pavličević	New	Not	1925	1946	?	Kosovo	Montenegrin	Male	
Anto Prgomet	New	Not	1932	1952	?	Bosnia-Herzegovina	Croat	Male	
Osman Šabanadžović	New	Not	1923	1951	?	Montenegro	Albanian	Male	
Ida Sabo	New	Not	1915	1939	2016	Vojvodina	Hungarian	Female	
Marijan Vidas	New	Not	1924	1944	?	Yugoslav People's Army	Croat	Male	

== Bibliography ==
=== Books ===
- Rajović, Radošin (1970). Jugoslovenski savremenici: Ko je ko u Jugoslaviji [Yugoslav Contemporaries: Who's Who in Yugoslavia] (in Serbo-Croatian). Hronometar.
- Martinović, Savo (1970). Deveti kongres Saveza komunista Jugoslavije, Beograd, 11-13. III.1969 [Ninth Congress of the League of Communists of Yugoslavia, Belgrade, 11–13. III 1969] (in Serbo-Croatian). Komunist.
- Opačić, Nine (1968). Društveno-političke zajednice: Socijalističke republike i autonomme pokrajine [Socio-Political Communities: Socialist Republics and Autonomous Provinces] (in Serbo-Croatian). Međunarodna štampa-Interpress.
- Staff writer, ed. (1953). VI kongres Komunističke partije Jugoslavije: 2-7 novembra 1952: stenografske beleške [VI Congress of the Communist Party of Yugoslavia] (in Serbo-Croatian). Kultura.

=== Newspapers ===
- Staff writer (24 June 1978). "Надзорна комисија Савеза комуниста Југославије" [Supervisory Commission of the League of Communists of Yugoslavia]. Borba (in Serbo-Croatian). Socialist Alliance of Working People: 6–7. Archived from the original on 14 January 2025.
