= Auditing Commission of the 8th Congress of the League of Communists of Yugoslavia =

8th Auditing Commission
- Emblem of the League of Communists of Yugoslavia

13 December 1964 – 11 March 1969 (4 years, 88 days) Overview
- Type: Auditing organ
- Election: 8th Congress

Members
- Total: 15 members
- Newcomers: 15 members (8th)
- Reelected: 1 (9th)

This electoral term of the Auditing Commission was elected by the 8th Congress of the League of Communists of Yugoslavia in 1964, and was in session until the convocation of the 9th Congress in 1969.

== Composition ==
Members of the Auditing Commission of the 8th Congress of the League of Communists of Yugoslavia
Name	7th	9th	Birth	PM	Death	Branch	Nationality	Gender	Ref.
Nikola Đakonović	New	Not	1911	1937	1965	Montenegro	Montenegrin	Male	
Milovan Dinić	New	Not	1927	1944	2020	Serbia	Serb	Male	
Pero Djetelić	New	Not	1926	1944	2009	Croatia	Croat	Male	
Momčilo Dragović	New	Not	1922	1943	?	Montenegro	Montenegrin	Male	
Radojka Katić	New	Elected	1922	1941	?	Croatia	Croat	Female	
Vukosava Mićunović	New	Not	1921	1942	2016	Montenegro	Montenegrin	Female	
Mitre Minovski	New	Not	1931	1949	?	Macedonia	Macedonian	Male	
Zorka Peršič	New	Not	1914	1941	2007	Slovenia	Slovene	Female	
Stjepan Puklek	New	Not	1916	1939	?	Croatia	Croat	Male	
Mićo Rakić	New	Not	1922	1941	2007	Bosnia-Herzegovina	Serb	Male	
Božo Raković	New	Not	1928	1944	?	Bosnia-Herzegovina	Serb	Male	
Milka Šćepanović	New	Not	1925	1942	?	Serbia	Serb	Female	
Gojko Sekulovski	New	Not	1925	1944	2002	Macedonia	Macedonian	Male	
Ilija Tepavac	New	Not	1922	1941	?	Serbia	Serb	Male	
Milan Vižintin	New	Not	1925	1944	?	Slovenia	Slovene	Male	

== Bibliography ==
- Janković, Slavko, ed. (1957). Ko je ko u Jugoslaviji: biografski podaci o jugoslovenskim savremenicima [Who's Who in Yugoslavia: Biographical Information About Yugoslav Contemporaries] (in Serbo-Croatian). Vol. 3. Izd. "Sedme sile".
- Rajović, Radošin (1970). Jugoslovenski savremenici: Ko je ko u Jugoslaviji [Yugoslav Contemporaries: Who's Who in Yugoslavia] (in Serbo-Croatian). Hronometar.
- Popović, Nikola (1977). Jugosloveni u oktobarskoj revoluciji: zbornik sećanja Jugoslovena ućesnika oktobarske revolucije i građanskog rata u Rusiji 1917–1921 [Yugoslavs in the October Revolution: A Collection of Memories of Yugoslav Participants in the October Revolution and the Russian Civil War 1917–1921] (in Serbo-Croatian). Institut za savremenu istoriju.
- Staff writer, ed. (1965). VIII Kongres Saveza Komunista Jugoslavije Beograd, 7–13. decembra 1964.: stenog̈rafske beleške [VIII Congress of the Union of Communists of Yugoslavia Belgrade, 7–13 December 1964: shorthand notes] (in Serbo-Croatian). Vol. 3. Kultura.
- Staff writer, ed. (1966). Svjetski almanah [World Almanac] (in Serbo-Croatian). Vol. 4. Novinsko izdavačko poduzeće.
- Tito, Josip Broz (1982). Damjanović, Pero; Vujošević, Ubavka (eds.). Sabrana djela: Septembar 1939-Septembar 1940 [Collected Works: September 1939 – September 1940] (in Serbo-Croatian). Komunist.
