= Mitar Bakić =

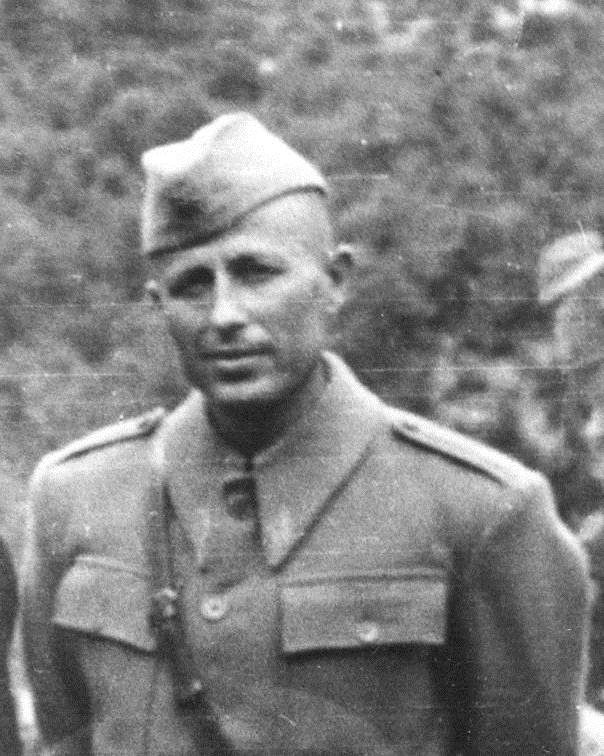
Mitar Bakić

Mitar Bakić (Serbian: Митар Бакић; Berislavci near Podgorica, 7 November 1908 - Belgrade, 25 November 1960), was a Yugoslav politician, general and People's Hero of Yugoslavia.

== Biography ==
During World War II, he was political commissar of the 4th Montenegrin brigade, 2nd Proletarian Division and 2nd Corps. After the war, he was the chief of staff of Josip Broz Tito, secretary-general of the Yugoslav government and member of Yugoslav mission in United Nations. He also had rank of reserve lieutenant general of Yugoslav People's Army.

== Gallery ==
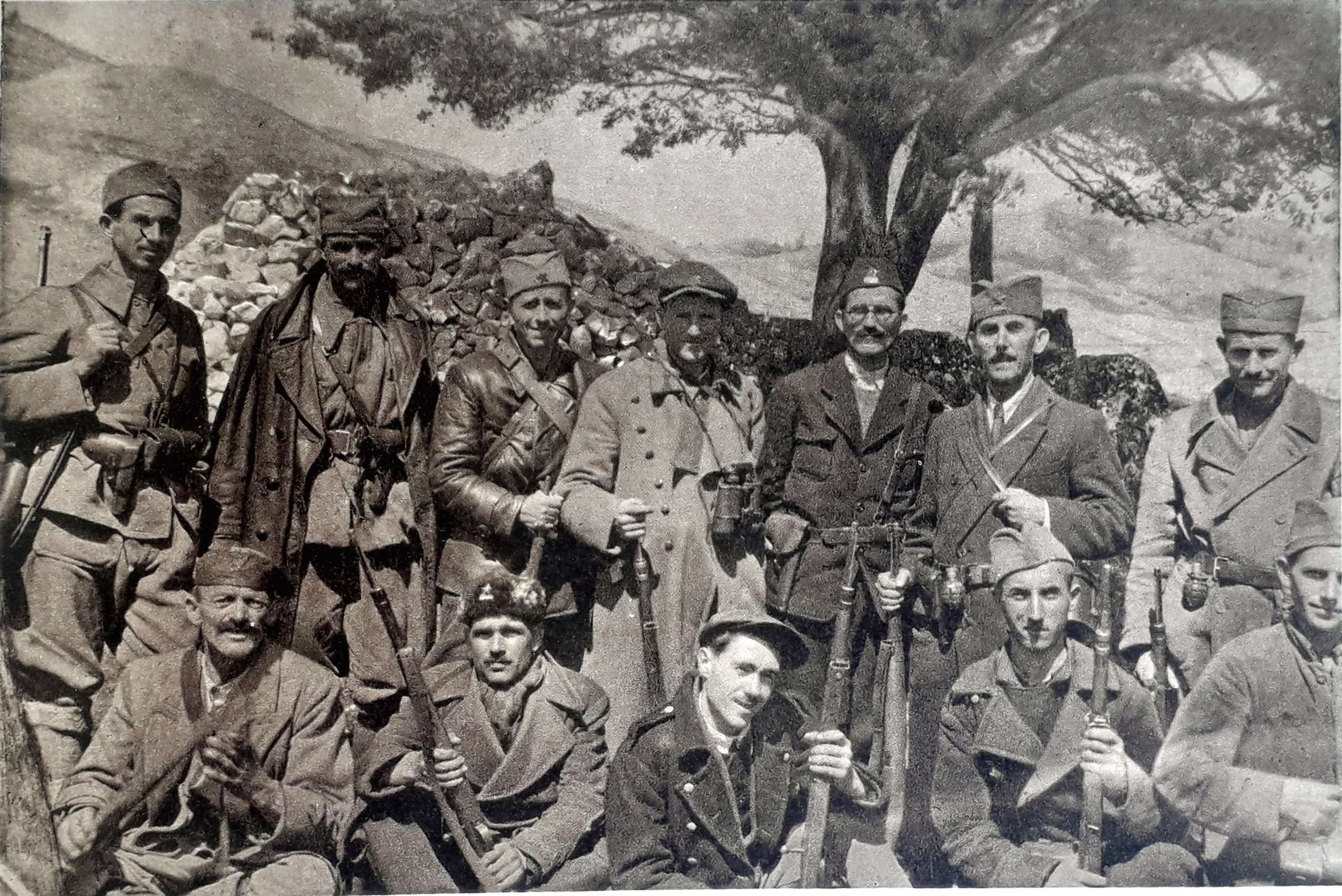
Leadership of partisan units from Montenegro. Standing from left to right: Mirko Burić, Blažo Jovanović, Mitar Bakić, Peko Dapčević, Ivan Milutinović, Savo Orović, Niko Strugar.

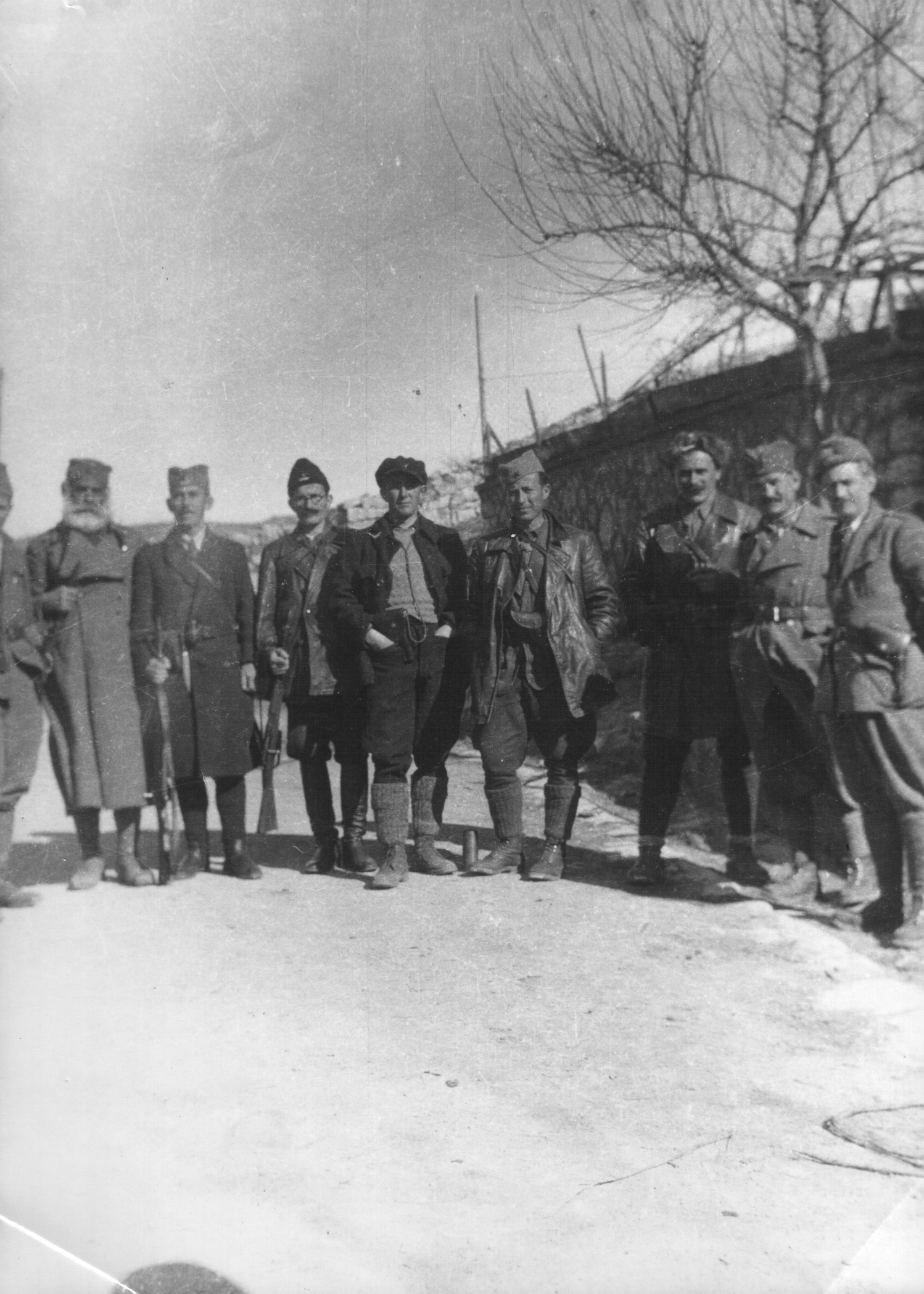
Leadership of partisan units from Montenegro. From left to right: Đoko Pavićević, Savo Orović, Ivan Milutinović, Milovan Đilas, Mitar Bakić, Sava Kovačević, Radoje Dakić.

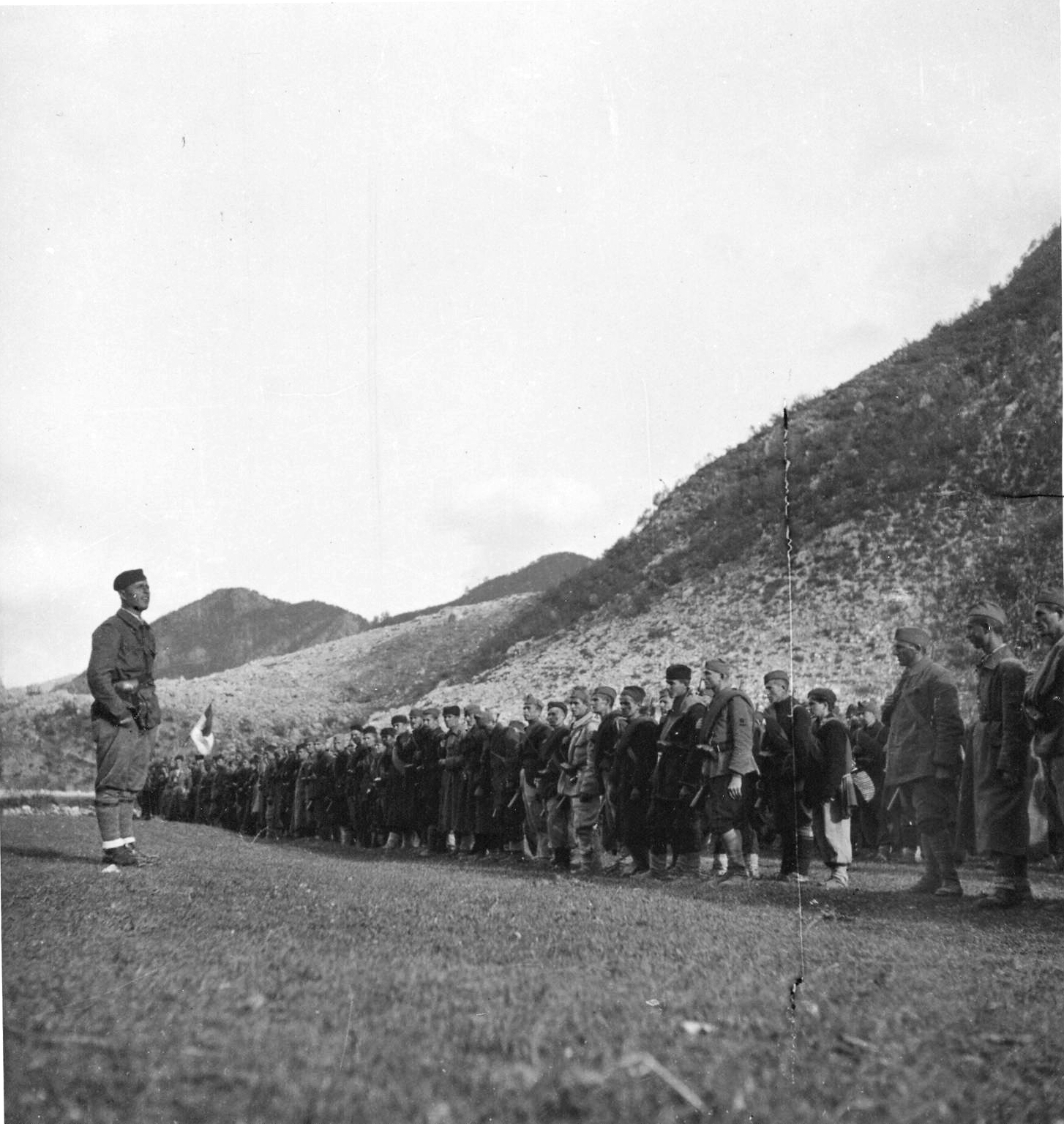
Bakić addresses to soldiers of 2nd Proleterian Division before Case White.

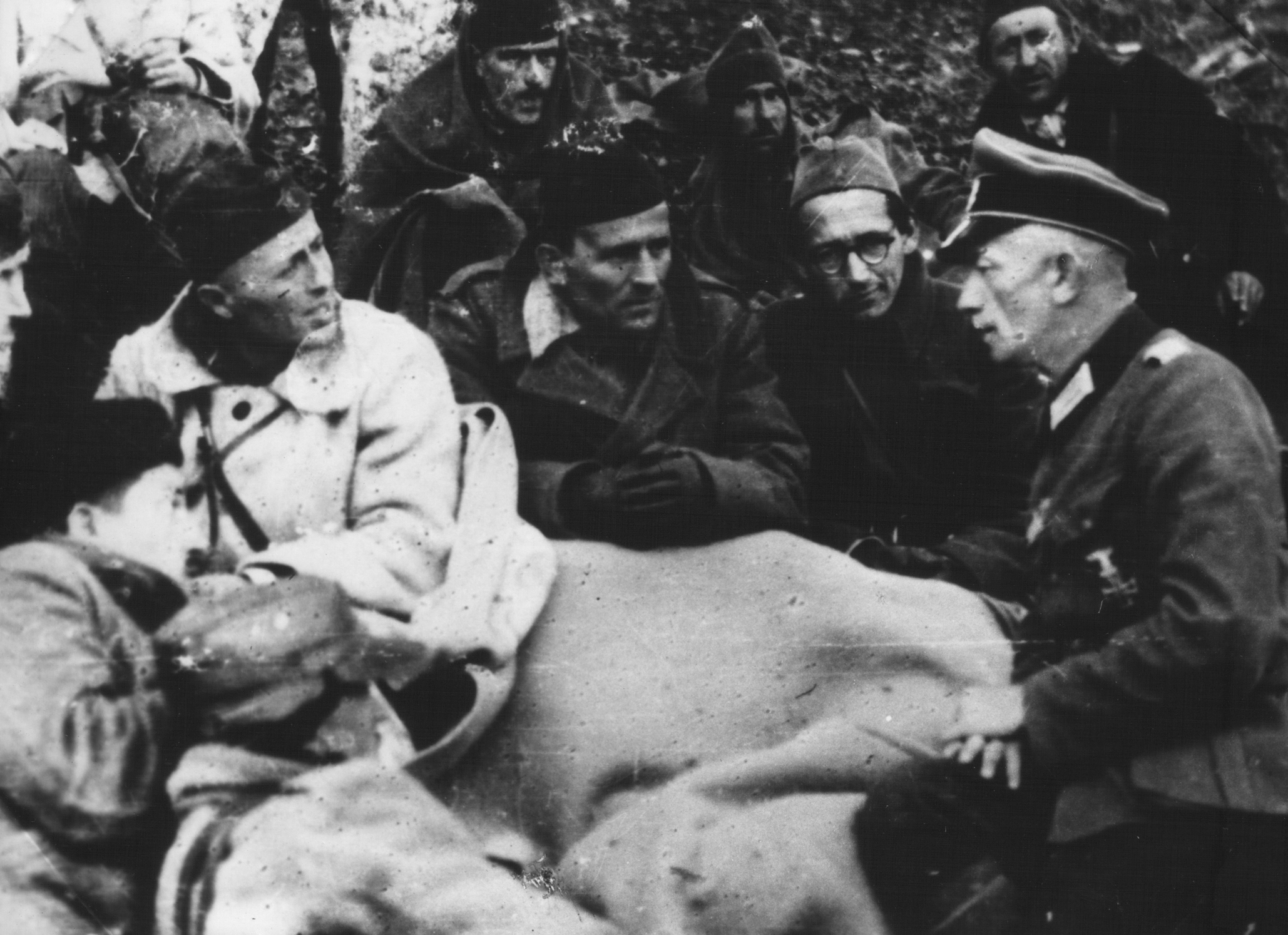
Political commissar Mitar Bakić (left) and commander of 2nd Proleterian Division Peko Dapčević (in the middle) interrogate captured Wehrmacht major Arthur Strecker during battle of Neretva.
