= Jovo Kapičić =

Montenegrin Yugoslav general (1919–2013)

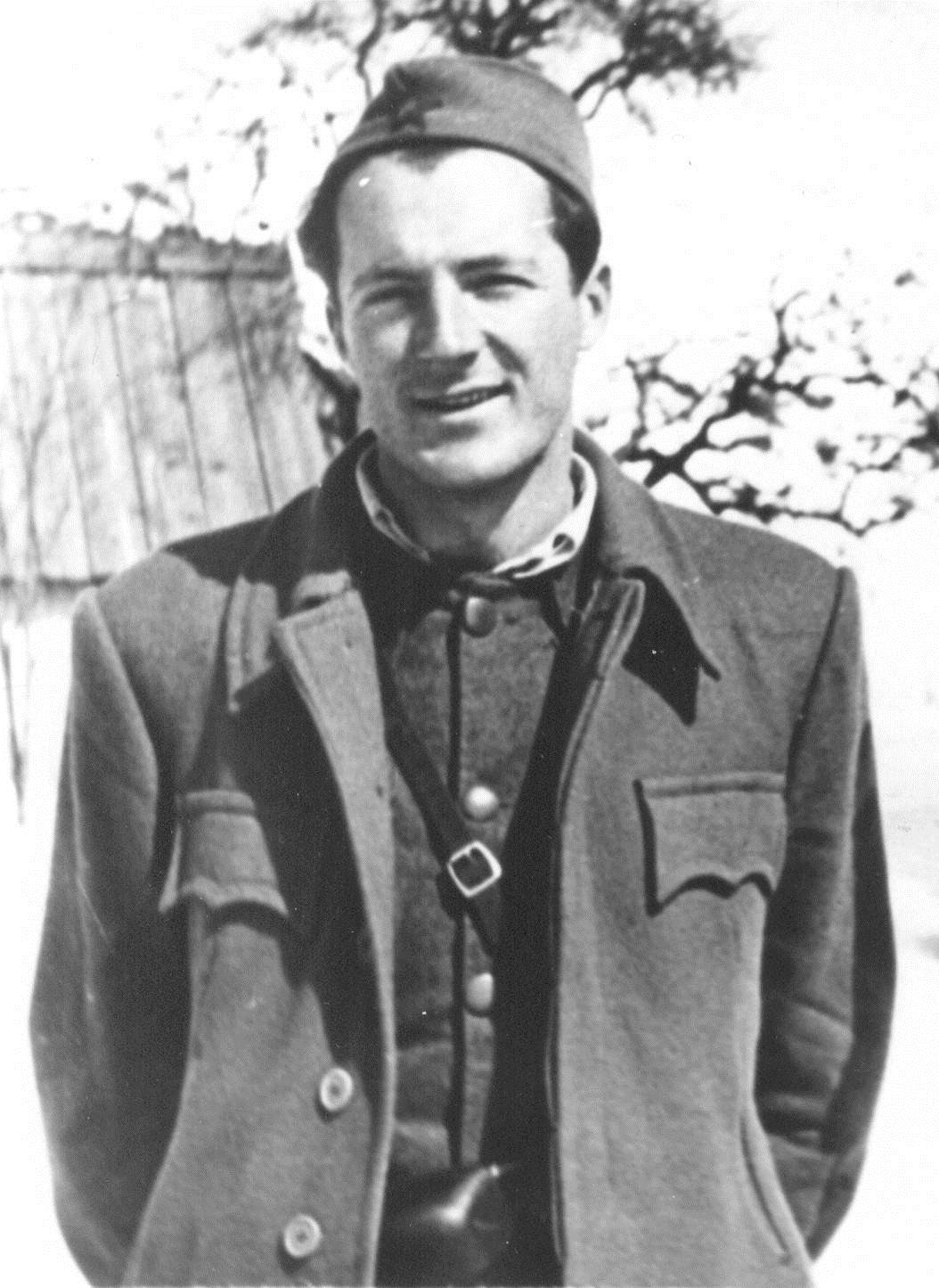
- Kapičić in 1944
- Born: 2 September 1919; Gaeta, Kingdom of Italy
- Died: 9 December 2013 (aged 94); Belgrade, Serbia
- Burial place: City Cemetery, Cetinje
- Military career
- Allegiance: Yugoslav Partisans International Brigades
- Service years: 1941–1955
- Nickname: Jovo Kapa
- Conflicts: World War II in Yugoslavia Spanish Civil War
- Awards: Order of the People's Hero

Jovan "Jovo" Kapičić, born Jovan Kapa, (Cyrillic: Јован Јово Капичић); 2 September 1919 – 9 December 2013) was a Yugoslav General and post-war communist politician, most famous for founding "Goli Otok" political concentration camp — famous for brutality.

== Early and personal life ==
Kapičić was born on 2 September 1919 in the Italian city of Gaeta where the Kingdom of Italy authorities had set up a large base for the Italian-supported exiled soldiers of the Royal Montenegrin Army following their unsuccessful 1919 Christmas Uprising against the Karađorđević dynasty. He was born with the surname Kapa, which he later changed to Kapičić. Jovo's father Milo Kapa was born in Ugnji near Cetinje, Montenegro, and he completed a theology degree. Later he was a theology professor and in 1918, he became a komita and joined the Montenegrin Federalist Party. Along with Jovo, Milo had two more sons (Pavle and Vlado or “Walter” who immigrated to the US in the 1930s) and a daughter Anka. Jovo was also an Ambassador of Socialist Federal Republic of Yugoslavia in People's Republic of Hungary in 1956 after the Hungarian Revolution of 1956. Jovo joined the Communist Party of Yugoslavia in 1936.

Jovo's son Dragan is a retired basketball player and his grandson Stefan Kapičić is an actor.
