= Josip Broz Tito =

Leader of Yugoslavia from 1943 to 1980

- Јосип Броз Тито
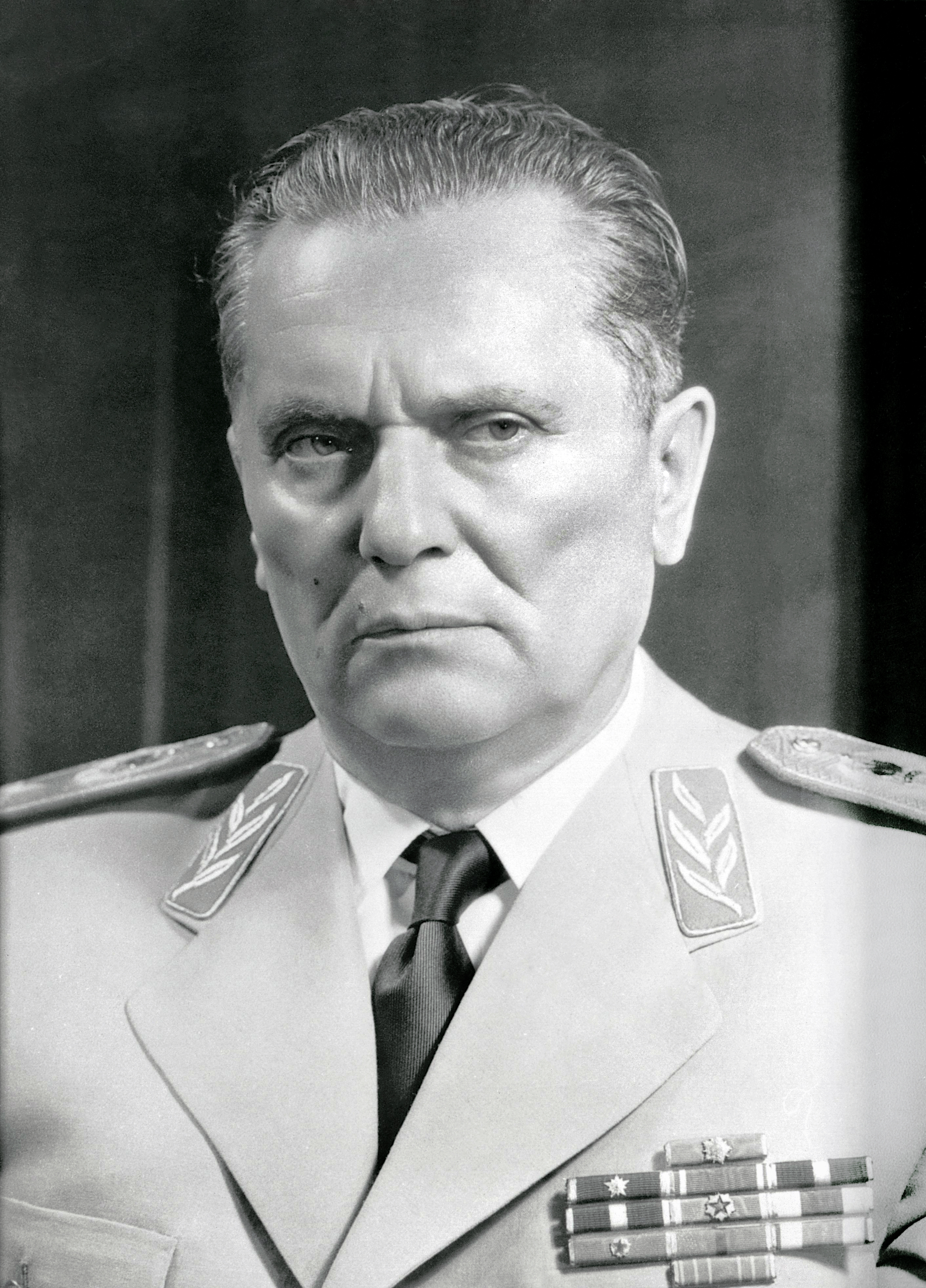
- Official portrait, 1961

President of Yugoslavia
- In office 14 January 1953 – 4 May 1980
- Prime Minister: See list: Himself (1953–1963) Petar Stambolić (1963–1967) Mika Špiljak (1967–1969) Mitja Ribičič (1969–1971) Džemal Bijedić (1971–1977) Veselin Đuranović (1977–1980)
- Vice President: See list: Aleksandar Ranković (1963–1966) Koča Popović (1966–1967)
- Preceded by: Ivan Ribar^{[a]}
- Succeeded by: Lazar Koliševski^{[b]}

Prime Minister of Yugoslavia
- In office 29 November 1945 – 29 June 1963
- President: Ivan Ribar; Himself (from 1953)
- Preceded by: Ivan Šubašić^{[c]} Himself^{[d]}
- Succeeded by: Petar Stambolić

Prime Minister of Democratic Federal Yugoslavia
- In office 29 November 1943 – 29 November 1945
- Monarch: Peter II
- President: Ivan Ribar^{[e]}
- Preceded by: Office established
- Succeeded by: Himself^{[h]}

President of the League of Communists of Yugoslavia
- In office 5 January 1939 – 4 May 1980
- Preceded by: Milan Gorkić^{[f]}
- Succeeded by: Stevan Doronjski^{[g]}

1st Secretary-General of the Non-Aligned Movement
- In office 1 September 1961 – 5 October 1964
- Preceded by: Office established
- Succeeded by: Gamal Abdel Nasser

Personal details
- Born: Josip Broz; 7 May 1892 Kumrovec, Croatia-Slavonia, Austria-Hungary
- Died: 4 May 1980 (aged 87) Ljubljana, SR Slovenia, Yugoslavia
- Resting place: House of Flowers, Belgrade, Serbia; 44°47′12″N 20°27′06″E
- Party: League of Communists of Yugoslavia (1920–1980); Social Democratic Party of Croatia and Slavonia (1910–1916)
- Spouses: See list: Pelageya Belousova (m. 1920; div. 1936); Lucia Bauer (m. 1936; died 1937); Herta Haas (m. 1940; div. 1943); Jovanka Budisavljević (m. 1952)
- Domestic partner: See list: Davorjanka Paunović (1943–1946)
- Relations: See list: Joška Broz (grandson) Svetlana Broz (granddaughter) Saša Broz (granddaughter)
- Children: See list: 5, including Žarko, Mišo
- Awards: Full list

Military service
- Allegiance: Austria-Hungary; Russian SFSR; Yugoslavia
- Branch/service: Austro-Hungarian Army; Red Army; Yugoslav People's Army
- Years of service: 1913–1915; 1918–1920; 1941–1980
- Rank: Marshal (1943–1980)
- Commands: National Liberation Army; Yugoslav People's Army (supreme commander)
- Battles/wars: World War I Russian Civil War; World War II
- Central institution membership: 1934–1980: Member, 4th, 5th, 6th, 7th, 8th, 9th, 10th, 11th Presidency; 1936–1966: Member, 4th, 5th, 6th, 7th, 8th Secretariat; 1934–1980: Member, 4th, 5th, 6th, 7th, 8th, 10th, 11th Central Committee; 1. As President of the Presidency of the People's Assembly of Yugoslavia.; 2. As President of the Presidency of Yugoslavia.; 3. As Prime Minister of the Yugoslav government-in-exile 4. As Prime Minister of Democratic Federal Yugoslavia; 5. As President of the Presidency of the AVNOJ; 6. As General Secretary of the Central Committee; 7. As President of the Presidency of the League of Communists; 8. As Prime Minister of Yugoslavia

Josip Broz (Note: Serbo-Croatian Cyrillic: Јосип Броз, pronounced [jǒsip brôːz].) (Note: Some particularly early sources would anglicize his name to Joseph.) (7 May 1892 – 4 May 1980), commonly known as Tito, (Note: English: /ˈtiːtoʊ/ TEE-toh; Serbo-Croatian Cyrillic: Тито, pronounced [tîto].) was a Yugoslav communist revolutionary and politician who led Yugoslavia as prime minister from 1943 to 1963 and as president from 1953 until his death in 1980. He was the longtime leader of the League of Communists of Yugoslavia, supreme commander of the Yugoslav Partisans during World War II, and one of the founders of the Non-Aligned Movement. The political ideology and policies associated with his rule are known as Titoism.

Tito was born in Kumrovec in present-day Croatia, then part of the Austro-Hungarian Empire. Drafted into military service, he distinguished himself, becoming the youngest sergeant major in the Austro-Hungarian Army. After being wounded and captured by the Russians during World War I, he was sent to a work camp in the Ural Mountains. Tito participated in the Russian Revolution in 1917 and the Russian Civil War. Upon his return to the Balkans in 1920, he entered the newly established Kingdom of Yugoslavia, where he joined the Communist Party of Yugoslavia. Tito assumed control of the party by 1937, became its general secretary in 1939 and led it until his death. During World War II, after the Axis invasion of Yugoslavia, he led the Yugoslav guerrilla movement, the Partisans (1941–1945), often regarded as the most effective resistance movement in German-occupied Europe. By the end of 1943, the Partisans, with the Allies' backing, took power in Yugoslavia.

After the war, Tito served as the prime minister (1943–1963), (Note: Upon the formation of the Provisional Government of the Democratic Federal Yugoslavia in March 1943, Tito was elected Prime Minister. Democratic Federal Yugoslavia preceded the post-war FPR/SFR Yugoslavia.) president (1953–1980; from 1974 president for life), and marshal of Yugoslavia, the highest rank of the Yugoslav People's Army (JNA). Under Tito's leadership, Yugoslavia became a communist state, known from 1945 to 1963 as the Federal People's Republic of Yugoslavia and thereafter as the Socialist Federal Republic of Yugoslavia. Despite being a founder of the Cominform, his party became the first member—and he the only leader during Joseph Stalin's lifetime—to defy Soviet hegemony in the Eastern Bloc, resulting in Yugoslavia's expulsion from the organisation in 1948 in the Tito–Stalin split. Alongside other leaders and Marxist theorists such as Edvard Kardelj and Milovan Đilas, he initiated the idiosyncratic model of socialist self-management. Tito wavered between supporting a centralised or more decentralised federation, and ended up favouring the latter to keep ethnic tensions under control. Thus, the constitution delegated much power to each republic. A powerful cult of personality arose around him and was sustained for several years after his death. Following Tito's death, Yugoslavia's leadership was transformed into an annually rotating presidency, giving representation to all its nationalities, and to prevent an authoritarian leader. Twelve years later, as communism collapsed in Eastern Europe and ethnic tensions escalated, Yugoslavia broke into several independent states and descended into a decade of interethnic wars, the deadliest conflict in Europe's postwar history until the Russo-Ukrainian war.

Historians critical of Tito view his presidency as authoritarian, while others characterise him as a benevolent dictator. He was popular in Yugoslavia and abroad, and remains so in the former countries of Yugoslavia. Tito was viewed as a unifying symbol, with his internal policies maintaining the peaceful coexistence of the nations of the Yugoslav federation. He gained further international attention as a co-founder of the Non-Aligned Movement. With a highly favourable reputation abroad in both Cold War blocs, he received a total of 98 foreign decorations, including the Legion of Honour and the Order of the Bath.

== Early life ==
=== Pre-World War I ===
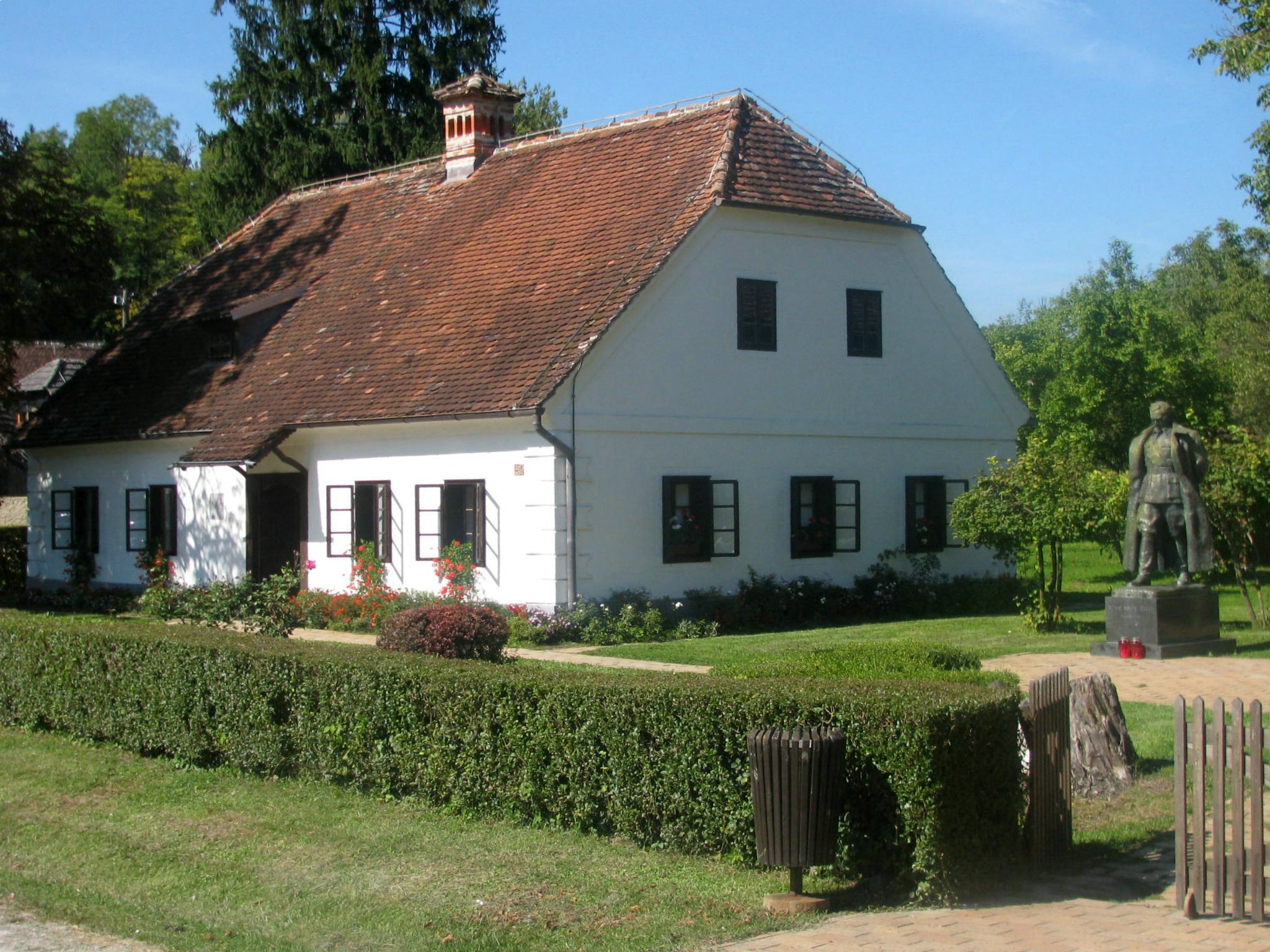
Tito's birthplace in the village of Kumrovec, Croatia

Josip Broz was born on 7 May 1892 (Note: After Tito became president of Yugoslavia, he celebrated his birthday on 25 May to mark the unsuccessful 1944 Nazi attempt on his life. The Germans found forged documents that stated 25 May was Tito's birthday and attacked him on that day.) in Kumrovec, a village in the northern Croatian region of Zagorje. At the time, it was part of the Kingdom of Croatia-Slavonia within the Austro-Hungarian Empire. (Note: Despite there being "not the slightest doubt" about the name, date and location of Tito's birth, many people in all parts of the former Yugoslavia give credence to various rumours about his origins. (see the section § Language and identity dispute)) He was the seventh or eighth child of Marija (née Javeršek) and Franjo Broz. His parents had already had a number of children die in early infancy. Broz was christened and raised as a Roman Catholic. His father was a Croat whose family had lived in the village for three centuries, while his mother was a Slovene from the village of Podsreda. Franjo had inherited a 4.0-hectare (10-acre) estate and a good house, but he was unable to make a success of farming. Josip spent a significant proportion of his pre-school years living with his maternal grandparents at Podsreda, where he became a favourite of his grandfather Martin Javeršek. By the time he returned to Kumrovec to begin school, he spoke Slovene better than Croatian, and had learned to play the piano. Despite his mixed parentage, Broz identified as a Croat like his father and neighbours.

In July 1900, Broz entered primary school at Kumrovec. He completed four years of school, failing 2nd grade and graduating in 1905. As a result of his limited schooling, throughout his life, Tito was poor at spelling. After leaving school, he initially worked for a maternal uncle and then on his parents' family farm. In 1907, his father wanted him to emigrate to the United States but could not raise the money for the voyage.

Instead, aged 15 years, Broz left Kumrovec and travelled about 97 kilometres (60 mi) south to Sisak, where his cousin Jurica Broz was doing army service. Jurica helped him get a job in a restaurant, but Broz soon got tired of that work. He approached a Czech locksmith, Nikola Karas, for a three-year apprenticeship, which included training, food, and room and board. As his father could not afford to pay for his work clothing, Broz paid for it himself. Soon after, his younger brother Stjepan also became apprenticed to Karas.

During his apprenticeship, Broz was encouraged to mark May Day in 1909, and he read and sold Slobodna Reč (lit. 'Free Word'), a socialist newspaper. After completing his apprenticeship in September 1910, Broz used his contacts to gain employment in Zagreb. At age 18, he joined the Metal Workers' Union and participated in his first labour protest. He also joined the Social Democratic Party of Croatia and Slavonia.

He returned home in December 1910. In early 1911, he began a series of moves in search of work, first in Ljubljana, then Trieste, Kumrovec and Zagreb, where he worked repairing bicycles. He joined his first strike action on May Day 1911. After a brief period of work in Ljubljana, between May 1911 and May 1912, he worked in a factory in Kamnik in the Kamnik–Savinja Alps. After it closed, he was offered redeployment to Čenkov in Bohemia. On arriving at his new workplace, he discovered that the employer was trying to bring in cheaper labour to replace the local Czech workers, and he and others joined successful strike action to force the employer to back down. (Note: Ridley notes that since his death, there have been stories written about this period in his life, some of which state that he married a Czech girl in 1912, with whom he had a son. According to Ridley, these stories are "almost impossible to verify".)

Driven by curiosity, Broz moved to Plzeň, where he was briefly employed at the Škoda Works. He next travelled to Munich in Bavaria. He also worked at the Benz car factory in Mannheim and visited the Ruhr industrial region. By October 1912, he had reached Vienna. He stayed with his older brother Martin and his family and worked at the Griedl Works before getting a job at Wiener Neustadt. There he worked for Austro-Daimler and was often asked to drive and test the cars. During this time, he spent considerable time fencing and dancing, and during his training and early work life, he also learned German and passable Czech. (Note: Ridley notes that some popular biographers falsely claim that he married for a second time in Vienna and had a son.)

=== World War I ===
In May 1913, Broz was conscripted into the Austro-Hungarian Army (Note: When he was conscripted into the army, his date of birth was recorded as 5 March 1892.) for his compulsory two years of service. He successfully requested to serve with the 25th Croatian Home Guard Regiment garrisoned in Zagreb. After learning to ski during the winter of 1913 and 1914, Broz was sent to a school for non-commissioned officers (NCO) in Budapest, after which he was promoted to sergeant major. At age 22, he was the youngest of that rank in his regiment. (Note: Vinterhalter states that he was promoted to sergeant after completing non-commissioned officer (NCO) training.) At least one source states that he was the youngest sergeant major in the Austro-Hungarian Army. After winning the regimental fencing competition, Broz came in second in the army fencing championships in Budapest in May 1914.

Soon after the outbreak of World War I in 1914, the 25th Croatian Home Guard Regiment marched toward the Serbian border. Broz was arrested for sedition and imprisoned in the Petrovaradin fortress in present-day Novi Sad. He later gave conflicting accounts of this arrest, telling one biographer that he had threatened to desert to the Russian side but also claiming that the whole matter arose from a clerical error. A third version was that he had been overheard saying that he hoped the Austro-Hungarian Empire would be defeated. After his acquittal and release, his regiment served briefly on the Serbian Front before being deployed to the Eastern Front in Galicia in early 1915 to fight against Russia. In his account of his military service, Broz did not mention that he participated in the failed Austrian invasion of Serbia, instead giving the misleading impression that he fought only in Galicia, as it would have offended Serbian opinion to know that he fought in 1914 for the Habsburgs against them. On one occasion, the scout platoon he commanded went behind the enemy lines and captured 80 Russian soldiers, bringing them back to their own lines alive. In 1980 it was discovered that Broz had been recommended for an award for gallantry and initiative in reconnaissance and capturing prisoners. Tito's biographer Richard West wrote that Tito actually downplayed his military record as the Austrian Army records showed that he was a brave soldier, which contradicted his later claim to have opposed the Habsburg monarchy and his self-portrait of himself as an unwilling conscript fighting in a war he opposed. Broz's fellow soldiers regarded him as kaisertreu ("true to the Emperor").

On 25 March 1915, (Note: West gives the date as 21 March, and Ridley says 4 April.) Broz was wounded in the back by a Circassian cavalryman's lance and captured during a Russian attack near the village of Vikno (Okno) in Bukovina. In his account of his capture, Broz wrote: "suddenly the right flank yielded and through the gap poured cavalry of the Circassians, from Asiatic Russia. Before we knew it they were thundering through our positions, leaping from their horses and throwing themselves into our trenches with lances lowered. One of them rammed his two-yard, iron-tipped, double-pronged lance into my back just below the left arm. I fainted. Then, as I learned, the Circassians began to butcher the wounded, even slashing them with their knives. Fortunately, Russian infantry reached the positions and put an end to the orgy".

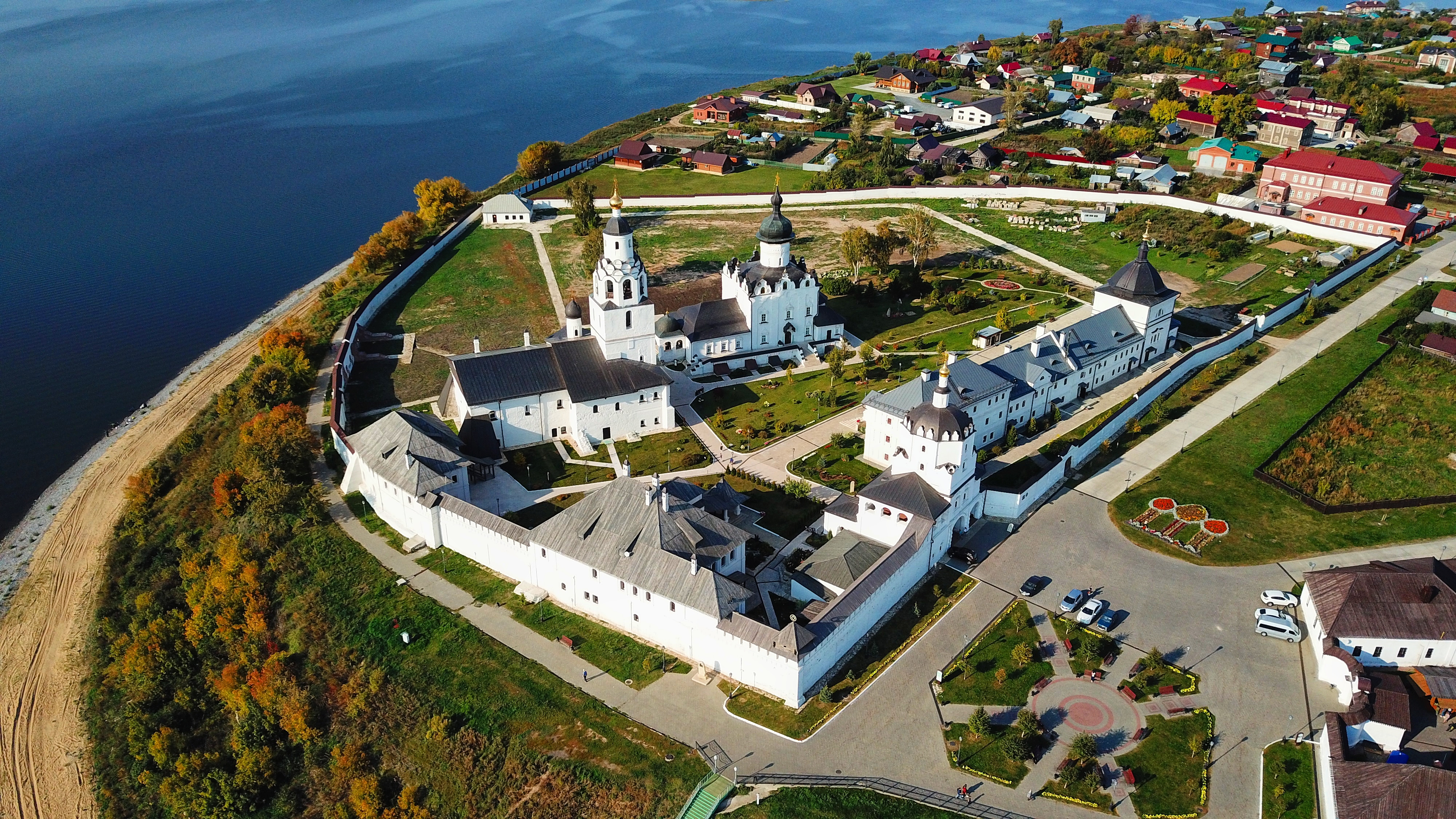
The Sviyazhsk Assumption Monastery, where Tito recuperated from his wounds

Now a prisoner of war (POW), Broz was transported east to a hospital established in an old monastery in the town of Sviyazhsk on the Volga river near Kazan. During his 13 months in hospital, he had bouts of unhealed spear wound, pneumonia and typhus which, according to his personal recollections, he narrowly survived. Having recovered sufficiently to leave the POW hospital, Broz was transferred in the spring of 1916 to his POW camp in the town of Alatyr, then part of the Simbirsk Governorate. There, according to his own recollections, he became friends with the then 49-year-old physician Ivan Nikolayevych Chistyakov and his daughter Antonina. He claimed that through socializing with her and another secondary-school student he further improved his Russian. They would allegedly borrow him literary classics by such authors as Tolstoy and Turgenev.

In mid-1916, Broz was transferred to the POW camp in Ardatov, where he used his skills to maintain the nearby village grain mill in Kalasyevo. His name appears in Ardatov archival records on a list of POWs, making it one of the extremely rare documents that confirm Broz's movements through Russia. At the end of the year, he was transferred to the Kungur POW camp near Perm where the POWs were used as labour to maintain the newly completed Trans-Siberian Railway. Broz was appointed to be in charge of all the POWs in the camp. According to his own recollections, during this period he became aware that camp staff were stealing the Red Cross parcels sent to the POWs; he complained and reported the stealings to the Red Cross delegate "Sarve", for which he was beaten and imprisoned by the Cossack guards at the camp. In his writings published in 1926, Swedish humanitarian missionary Johan Wilhelm Sarwe mentioned that he had travelled to Kungur by sleigh in February 1917, which chronologically coincides with Broz's accounts.

During the February Revolution, a crowd broke into the prison and returned Broz to the POW camp. A Bolshevik he had met while working on the railway told Broz that his son was working in engineering works in Petrograd, so, in June 1917, Broz walked out of the unguarded POW camp and hid aboard a goods train bound for that city, where he stayed with his friend's son. The journalist Richard West has suggested that because Broz chose to remain in an unguarded POW camp rather than volunteer to serve with the Yugoslav legions of the Serbian Army, he was still loyal to the Austro-Hungarian Empire, undermining his later claim that he and other Croat POWs were excited by the prospect of revolution and looked forward to the overthrow of the empire that ruled them.

Less than a month after Broz arrived in Petrograd, the July Days demonstrations broke out, and Broz joined in, coming under fire from government troops. In the aftermath, he tried to flee to Finland in order to make his way to the United States but was stopped at the border. He was arrested along with other suspected Bolsheviks during the subsequent crackdown by the Russian Provisional Government led by Alexander Kerensky. He was imprisoned in the Peter and Paul Fortress for three weeks, during which he claimed to be an innocent citizen of Perm. When he finally admitted to being an escaped POW, he was to be returned by train to Kungur, but escaped at Yekaterinburg, then caught another train that reached Omsk in Siberia on 8 November after a 3,200-kilometre (2,000 mi) journey. At one point, police searched the train looking for an escaped POW, but were deceived by Broz's fluent Russian.

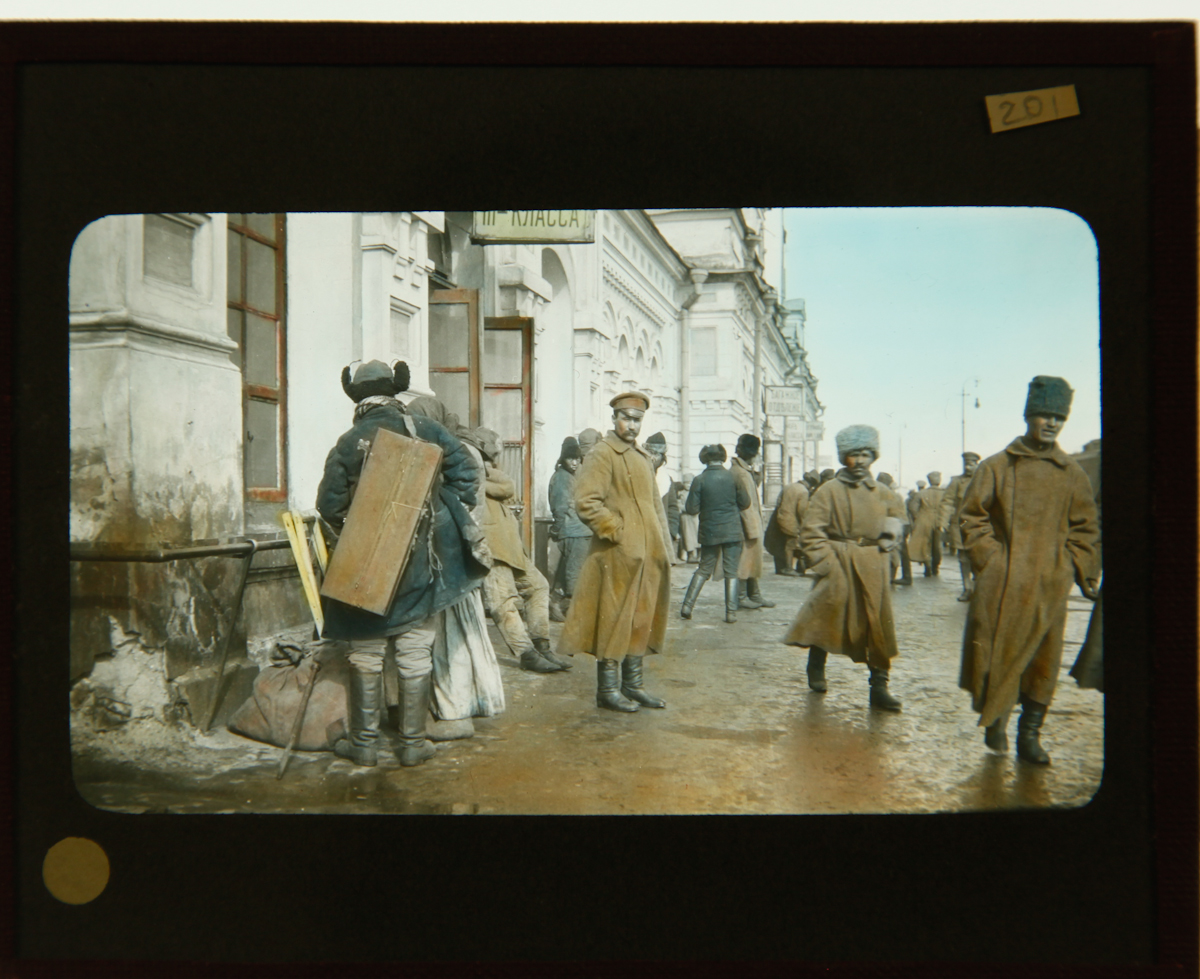
Russian soldiers outside Omsk railway station in 1917.

In Omsk, local Bolsheviks stopped the train and told Broz that Vladimir Lenin had seized control of Petrograd. They recruited him into an International Red Guard that guarded the Trans-Siberian Railway during the winter of 1917 and 1918. In May 1918, the anti-Bolshevik Czechoslovak Legion wrested control of parts of Siberia from Bolshevik forces, the Provisional Siberian Government established itself in Omsk after winning battles at Maryanovka on 25 May and 6 June 1918, with no evidence of Broz participating in the armed conflict. Broz and his comrades scattered, went into hiding - he would find refuge and employment in the steppe, in a village of Ukrainian settlers called Mikhailovka, established about 50 kilometres west of Omsk. At this time, Broz met a 14-year-old local girl, Pelagija "Polka" Belousova, who hid him and then helped him escape to Koychubay, a Kazakh village 64 kilometres (40 mi) from Omsk. Broz again worked maintaining the local mill, this time for a prominent rural Kazakh entrepreneur Isa Zhaksybayev.

Living with the half-nomadic Kazakh tribe for more than a year has been described as the most exotic part of Broz's long and adventurous life. He dressed in the Kazakh clothes, learned some language, shared the lifestyle of the Muslim natives who lived in the steppe and stayed in yurts. In his recollections, Broz, as well as the descendants of Zhaksybayev in present-day Koychubay, describe an allegedly close relationship between Broz, who worked as a mechanic, and his employer, a man who enjoyed a certain standing among the tribal elites of the area. His descendants preserve a family oral tradition that Zhaksybayev played a patronal role in arranging the marriage of Josip Broz to Pelagija Belousova from the nearby Slavic village of Mikhailovka. A number of local sources also mention the existence of small partisan groups in the forests of the Maryanovka area, which, in the circumstances of the Russian Civil War, probably gave the young Josip Broz his first direct or indirect experience of the phenomenon of partisan warfare. Broz himself often described his own involvement in the Russian Civil War and the Revolution as insignificant. He also described his health as very poor at the time, due to the wound and illnesses he had suffered back in 1915. He recalled "spitting blood" and "expecting he might pass away", and claimed that he finally recovered while living among the Kazakhs, attributing much of his recovery to their traditional drink, kumis.

In November 1919, when the Red Army recaptured Omsk from White forces loyal to the Provisional All-Russian Government of Alexander Kolchak, Broz moved back to Omsk and married Belousova in January 1920. (Note: West states that the marriage occurred in mid-1919.) At the time of their marriage, Broz was 27 years old and Pelagia Belousova was 14. They divorced in the 1930s in Moscow. Broz later wrote that during his time in Russia, he heard much talk of Lenin, a little of Trotsky, and "as for Stalin, during the time I stayed in Russia, I never once heard his name". Tito joined the Communist Party in 1920 in Omsk. In the autumn of 1920, he and his pregnant wife returned to his homeland, by train to Narva, by ship to Stettin, then by train to Vienna, where they arrived on 20 September. In early October, Broz returned to Kumrovec in what was then the Kingdom of Serbs, Croats and Slovenes to find that his mother had died and his father had moved to Jastrebarsko, near Zagreb. Sources differ over whether Broz joined the Communist Party of the Soviet Union while in Russia, but he said that the first time he joined the Communist Party of Yugoslavia (CPY) was in Zagreb after he returned to his homeland.

== Interwar communist activity ==
=== Communist agitator ===
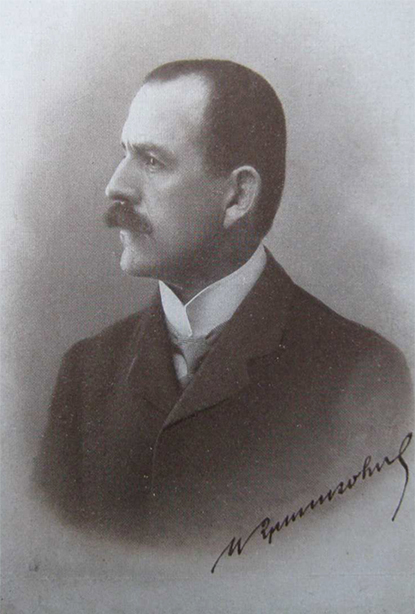
The assassination of the Minister of the Interior, Milorad Drašković, led to the outlawing of the Communist Party.

Upon his return home, Broz was unable to gain employment as a metalworker in Kumrovec, so he and his wife moved briefly to Zagreb, where he worked as a waiter and took part in a waiters' strike. He also joined the CPY. The CPY's influence on the political life of Yugoslavia was growing rapidly. In the 1920 elections, it won 59 seats and became the third-strongest party. In light of difficult economic and social circumstances, the regime viewed the CPY as the main threat to the system of government. On 30 December, the government issued a Proclamation (Obznana) outlawing communist activities, which included bans on propaganda, assembly halls, stripping of civil service for servants and scholarships for students found to be communist. Its author, Milorad Drašković, the Yugoslav Minister of the Interior, was assassinated by a young communist, Alija Alijagić, on 2 August 1921. The CPY was then declared illegal under the Yugoslav State Security Act of 1921, and the regime proceeded to prosecute party members and sympathisers as political prisoners.

Due to his overt communist links, Broz was fired from his employment. He and his wife then moved to the village of Veliko Trojstvo where he worked as a mill mechanic. After the arrest of the CPY leadership in January 1922, Stevo Sabić took over control of its operations. Sabić contacted Broz, who agreed to work illegally for the party, distributing leaflets and agitating among factory workers. In the contest of ideas between those that wanted to pursue moderate policies and those that advocated violent revolution, Broz sided with the latter. In 1924, Broz was elected to the CPY district committee, but after he gave a speech at a comrade's Catholic funeral, he was arrested when the priest complained. Paraded through the streets in chains, he was held for eight days and was eventually charged with creating a public disturbance. With the help of a Serbian Orthodox prosecutor who hated Catholics, Broz and his co-accused were acquitted. His brush with the law had marked him as a communist agitator, and his home was searched on an almost weekly basis. Since their arrival in Yugoslavia, Pelagija had lost three babies soon after their births and one daughter, Zlatica, at the age of two. Broz felt the loss of Zlatica deeply. In 1924, Pelagija gave birth to a boy, Žarko, who survived. In mid-1925, Broz's employer died, and the new mill owner gave him an ultimatum: give up his communist activities or lose his job. So, at age 33, Broz became a professional revolutionary.

=== Professional revolutionary ===
The CPY concentrated its revolutionary efforts on factory workers in the more industrialised areas of Croatia and Slovenia, encouraging strikes and similar action. In 1925, the now unemployed Broz moved to Kraljevica on the Adriatic coast, where he started working at a shipyard to further the aims of the CPY. During his time in Kraljevica, he acquired a love of the warm, sunny Adriatic coastline that lasted for the rest of his life, and throughout his later time as leader, he spent as much time as possible living on his yacht while cruising the Adriatic.

While at Kraljevica, he worked on Yugoslav torpedo boats and a pleasure yacht for the People's Radical Party politician, Milan Stojadinović. Broz built up the trade union organisation in the shipyards and was elected as a union representative. A year later, he led a shipyard strike and soon after was fired. In October 1926, he obtained work in a railway works in Smederevska Palanka near Belgrade. In March 1927, he wrote an article complaining about the exploitation of workers in the factory, and after speaking up for a worker, he was promptly sacked. Identified by the CPY as worthy of promotion, he was appointed secretary of the Zagreb branch of the Metal Workers' Union and, soon thereafter, the union's whole Croatian branch. In July 1927, Broz was arrested along with six other workers, and imprisoned at nearby Ogulin. After being held without trial for some time, he went on a hunger strike until a date was set. The trial was held in secret, and he was found guilty of being a member of the CPY. Sentenced to four months' imprisonment, he was released from prison pending an appeal. On the CPY's orders, Broz did not report to court for the hearing of the appeal, instead going into hiding in Zagreb. Wearing dark spectacles and carrying forged papers, Broz posed as a middle-class technician in the engineering industry, working undercover to contact other CPY members and coordinate their infiltration of trade unions.

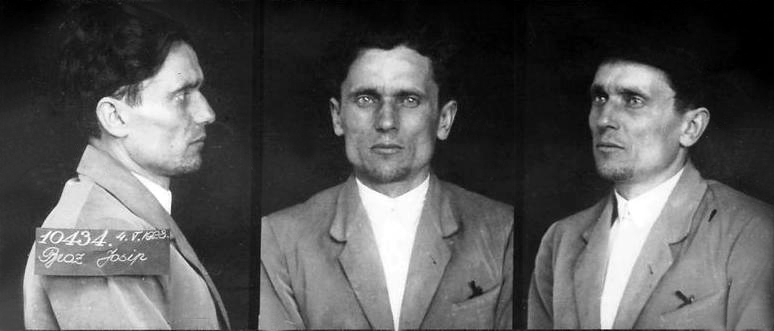
Tito's mug shot after arrest for communist activities in 1928

In February 1928, Broz was one of 32 delegates to the conference of the Croatian branch of the CPY. During the conference, he condemned factions within the party, including those that advocated a Greater Serbia agenda within Yugoslavia, like the long-term CPY leader Sima Marković. Broz proposed that the executive committee of the Communist International purge the branch of factionalism and was supported by a delegate sent from Moscow. After it was proposed that the Croatian branch's entire central committee be dismissed, a new central committee was elected, with Broz as its secretary. Marković was subsequently expelled from the CPY at the Fourth Congress of the Comintern, and the CPY adopted a policy of working for the breakup of Yugoslavia. Broz arranged to disrupt a meeting of the Social-Democratic Party on May Day that year; in a melee outside the venue, police arrested him. They failed to identify him, charging him under his false name for a breach of the peace. He was imprisoned for 14 days and then released, returning to his previous activities. The police eventually tracked him down with the help of a police informer. He was ill-treated and held for three months before being tried in court in November 1928 for his illegal communist activities, which included allegations that police had planted the bombs found at his address. He was convicted and sentenced to five years' imprisonment.

=== Prison ===
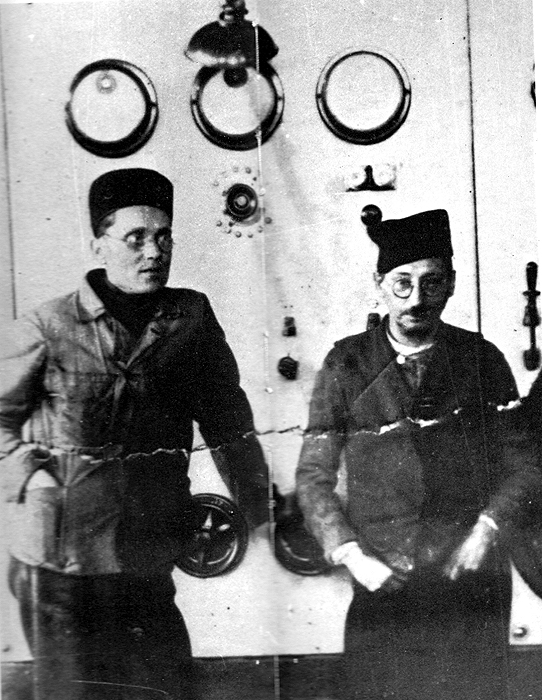
Tito (left) and his ideological mentor Moša Pijade while they were imprisoned in the Lepoglava jail, 1930s

After Broz's sentencing, his wife and son returned to Kumrovec, where sympathetic locals looked after them, but then one day, they suddenly left without explanation and returned to the Soviet Union. She fell in love with another man, and Žarko grew up in institutions; even after he became famous, details of Broz's life were so obscure that all John Gunther could write in 1949 about his wife after meeting him was that she was possibly Russian and "died many years ago". After arriving at Lepoglava prison, Broz was employed in maintaining the electrical system and chose as his assistant a middle-class Belgrade Jew, Moša Pijade, who had been given a 20-year sentence for his communist activities. Their work allowed Broz and Pijade to move around the prison, contacting and organising other communist prisoners. During their time together in Lepoglava, Pijade became Broz's ideological mentor. After two and a half years at Lepoglava, Broz was accused of attempting to escape and was transferred to Maribor prison, where he was held in solitary confinement for several months. After completing the full term of his sentence, he was released, only to be arrested outside the prison gates and taken to Ogulin to serve the four-month sentence he had avoided in 1927. He was finally released from prison on 16 March 1934, but even then, he was subject to orders that required him to live in Kumrovec and report to the police daily. During his imprisonment, the political situation in Europe had changed significantly, with the rise of Adolf Hitler in Germany and the emergence of right-wing parties in France and neighbouring Austria. He returned to a warm welcome in Kumrovec but did not stay long. In early May, he received word from the CPY to return to his revolutionary activities and left his hometown for Zagreb, where he rejoined the Central Committee of the Communist Party of Croatia.

The Croatian branch of the CPY was in disarray, a situation exacerbated by the escape of the executive committee of the CPY to Vienna in Austria, from which they were directing activities. Over the next six months, Broz travelled several times between Zagreb, Ljubljana and Vienna, using false passports. In July 1934, he was blackmailed by a smuggler but pressed on across the border and was detained by the local Heimwehr, a paramilitary Home Guard. He used the Austrian accent he had developed during his war service to convince them that he was a wayward Austrian mountaineer, and they allowed him to proceed to Vienna. Once there, he contacted the General Secretary of the CPY, Milan Gorkić, who sent him to Ljubljana to arrange a secret conference of the CPY in Slovenia. The conference was held at the summer palace of the Roman Catholic bishop of Ljubljana, whose brother was a communist sympathiser. It was at this conference that Broz first met Edvard Kardelj, a young Slovene communist who had recently been released from prison. Broz and Kardelj subsequently became good friends, with Tito later regarding him as his most reliable deputy. As he was wanted by the police for failing to report to them in Kumrovec, Broz adopted various pseudonyms, including "Rudi" and "Tito". He used the latter as a pen name when he wrote articles for party journals in 1934, and it stuck. He gave no reason for choosing the name "Tito" except that it was a common nickname for men from the district where he grew up. Within the Comintern network, his nickname was "Walter"; because of the obscurity of details of his life, many imaginative theories would spread about the "Tito" nickname's origin.

=== Flight from Yugoslavia ===
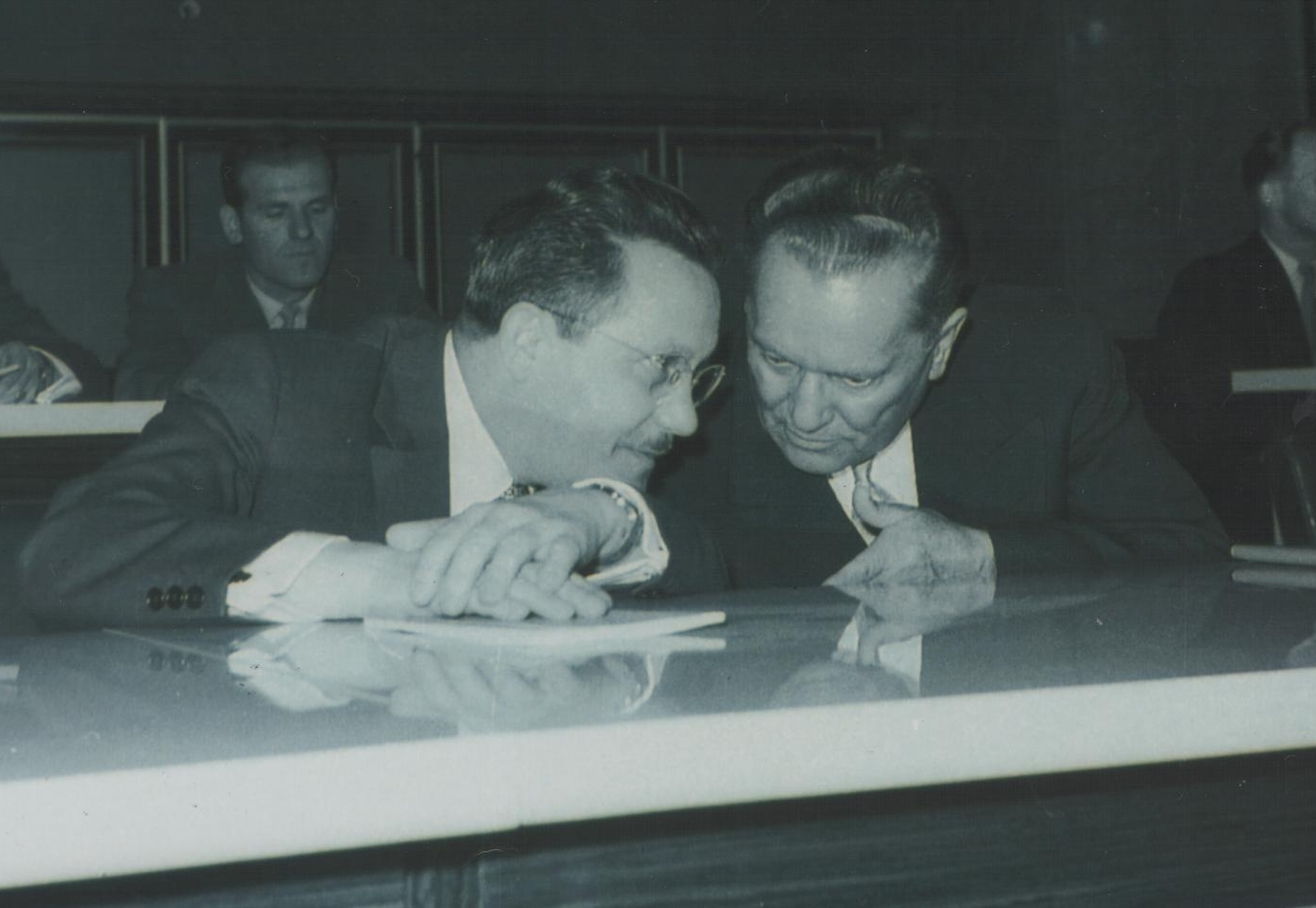
Edvard Kardelj (left) met Tito in 1934 and they became close friends

During this time, Tito wrote articles on the duties of imprisoned communists and on trade unions. He was in Ljubljana when Vlado Chernozemski, an assassin for the Internal Macedonian Revolutionary Organization (IMRO) and instructor for the Croatian ultranationalist organisation Ustaše, assassinated King Alexander in Marseilles on 9 October 1934. In the crackdown on dissidents that followed his death, it was decided that Tito should leave Yugoslavia. He travelled to Vienna on a forged Czechoslovak passport, where he joined Gorkić and the rest of the Politburo of the CPY. It was decided that the Austrian government was too hostile to communism, so the Politburo travelled to Brno in Czechoslovakia, and Tito accompanied them. On Christmas Day 1934, a secret meeting of the Central Committee of the CPY was held in Ljubljana, and Tito was elected as a member of the Politburo for the first time. The Politburo decided to send him to Moscow to report on the situation in Yugoslavia, and in early February 1935, he arrived there as a full-time official of the Comintern. He lodged at the main Comintern residence, the Hotel Lux on Tverskaya Street and was quickly in contact with Vladimir Ćopić, one of the leading Yugoslavs with the Comintern. He was soon introduced to the main personalities in the organisation. Tito was appointed to the secretariat of the Balkan section, responsible for Yugoslavia, Bulgaria, Romania and Greece. Kardelj was also in Moscow, as was the Bulgarian communist leader Georgi Dimitrov. Tito lectured on trade unions to foreign communists and attended a course on military tactics run by the Red Army, and occasionally attended the Bolshoi Theatre. He attended as one of 510 delegates to the Seventh World Congress of the Comintern in July and August 1935, where he briefly saw Joseph Stalin for the first time. After the congress, he toured the Soviet Union and then returned to Moscow to continue his work. He contacted Polka and Žarko, but soon fell in love with an Austrian woman who worked at the Hotel Lux, Johanna Koenig, known within communist ranks as Lucia Bauer. When she became aware of this liaison, Polka divorced Tito in April 1936. Tito married Bauer on 13 October of that year.

After the World Congress, Tito worked to promote the new Comintern line on Yugoslavia, which was that it would no longer work to break up the country and would instead defend the integrity of Yugoslavia against Nazism and Fascism. From a distance, Tito also worked to organise strikes at the shipyards at Kraljevica and the coal mines at Trbovlje near Ljubljana. He tried to convince the Comintern that it would be better if the party leadership were located inside Yugoslavia. A compromise was arrived at, where Tito and others would work inside the country, and Gorkić and the Politburo would continue to work from abroad. Gorkić and the Politburo relocated to Paris, while Tito began to travel between Moscow, Paris and Zagreb in 1936 and 1937, using false passports. In 1936, his father died.

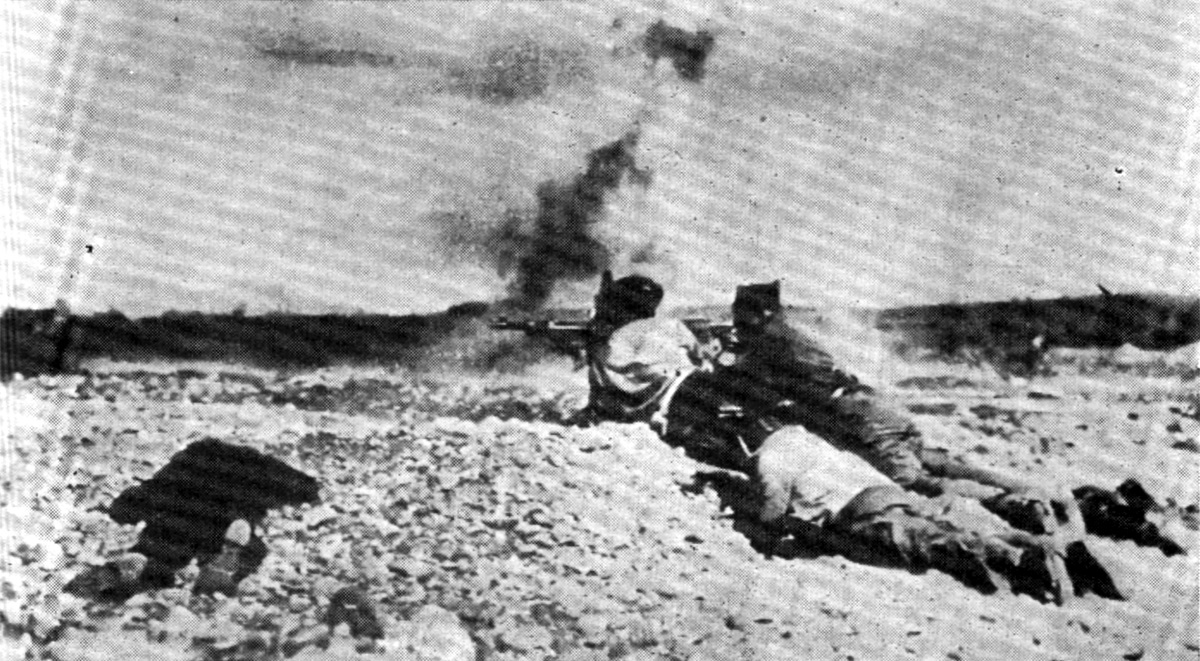
Yugoslav volunteers fighting in the Spanish Civil War

Tito returned to Moscow in August 1936, soon after the outbreak of the Spanish Civil War. At the time, the Great Purge was underway, and foreign communists like Tito and his Yugoslav compatriots were particularly vulnerable. Despite a laudatory report written by Tito about the veteran Yugoslav communist Filip Filipović, Filipović was arrested and shot by the Soviet secret police, the NKVD. However, before the Purge really began to erode the ranks of the Yugoslav communists in Moscow, Tito was sent back to Yugoslavia with a new mission, to recruit volunteers for the International Brigades being raised to fight on the Republican side in the Spanish Civil War. Travelling via Vienna, he reached the coastal port city of Split in December 1936. According to the Croatian historian Ivo Banac, the reason the Comintern sent Tito back to Yugoslavia was to purge the CPY. An initial attempt to send 500 volunteers to Spain by ship failed, with nearly all the volunteers arrested and imprisoned. Tito then travelled to Paris, where he arranged the volunteers' travel to France under the cover of attending the Paris Exhibition. Once in France, the volunteers crossed the Pyrenees to Spain. In all, he sent 1,192 men to fight in the war, but only 330 came from Yugoslavia; the rest were expatriates in France, Belgium, the U.S. and Canada. Fewer than half were communists, and the rest were social-democrats and anti-fascists of various hues. Of the total, 671 were killed in the fighting, and 300 were wounded. Despite speculation that he had fought in the Spanish War, Tito himself denied going to Spain. Between May and August 1937, he travelled several times between Paris and Zagreb, organising the movement of volunteers and creating a separate Communist Party of Croatia. The new party was inaugurated at a conference at Samobor on the outskirts of Zagreb on 1–2 August 1937. Tito later played a crucial role in organizing the return of the Yugoslav volunteers of the Spanish Civil War from German concentration camps to Yugoslavia when the decision was made to mount an armed resistance to the Axis occupation (see § World War II).

=== General Secretary of the CPY ===
In June 1937, Gorkić was summoned to Moscow, where he was arrested, and after months of NKVD interrogation, he was shot. According to Banac, Gorkić was killed on Stalin's orders. West concludes that despite being in competition with men like Gorkić for the leadership of the CPY, it was not in Tito's character to have innocent people sent to their deaths. Tito then received a message from the Politburo of the CPY to join them in Paris. In August 1937, he became acting General Secretary of the CPY. He later explained that he survived the Purge by staying out of Spain, where the NKVD was active, and also by avoiding visiting the Soviet Union as much as possible. When first appointed as general secretary, he avoided travelling to Moscow by insisting that he needed to deal with some disciplinary issues in the CPY in Paris. He also promoted the idea that the upper echelons of the CPY should be sharing the dangers of underground resistance within the country. He developed a new, younger leadership team that was loyal to him, including the Slovene Edvard Kardelj, the Serb, Aleksandar Ranković, and the Montenegrin, Milovan Đilas. In December 1937, Tito arranged for a demonstration to greet the French foreign minister when he visited Belgrade, expressing solidarity with the French against Nazi Germany. The protest march numbered 30,000 and turned into a protest against the neutrality policy of the Stojadinović government. It was eventually broken up by the police. In March 1938, Tito returned to Yugoslavia from Paris. Hearing a rumour that his opponents within the CPY had tipped off the police, he travelled to Belgrade rather than Zagreb and used a different passport. While in Belgrade, he stayed with a young intellectual, Vladimir Dedijer, who was a friend of Đilas. Arriving in Yugoslavia a few days ahead of the Anschluss between Nazi Germany and Austria, he made an appeal condemning it, in which the CPY was joined by the Social Democrats and trade unions. In June, Tito wrote to the Comintern, suggesting that he should visit Moscow. He waited in Paris for two months for his Soviet visa before travelling to Moscow via Copenhagen. He arrived in Moscow on 24 August.

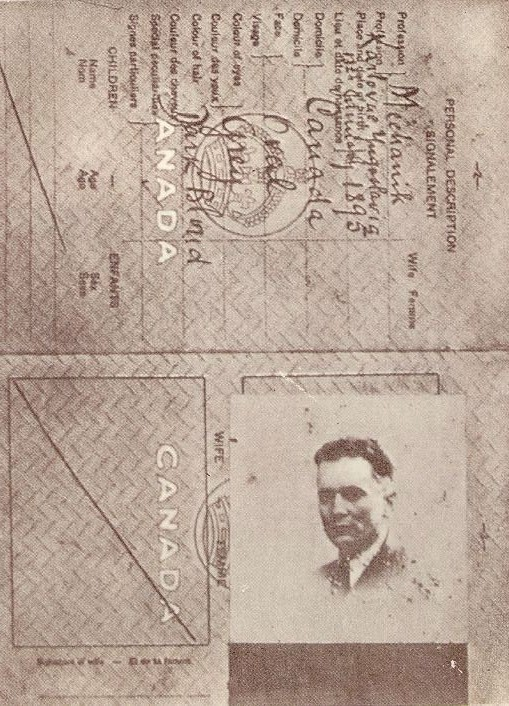
Fake Canadian ID, "Spiridon Mekas", used for returning to Yugoslavia from Moscow, 1939

On his arrival in Moscow, Tito found that all Yugoslav communists were under suspicion. The NKVD arrested and executed nearly all of the CPY's most prominent leaders, including over 20 members of the Central Committee. Both Tito's ex-wife Polka and his wife Koenig/Bauer were arrested as "imperialist spies". Both were eventually released, Polka after 27 months in prison. Tito therefore needed to make arrangements for the care of Žarko, who was 14. He placed him in a boarding school outside Kharkov, then at a school at Penza, but he ran away twice and was eventually taken in by a friend's mother. In 1941, Žarko joined the Red Army to fight the invading Germans. Some of Tito's critics argue that his survival indicates he must have denounced his comrades as Trotskyists. He was asked for information on a number of his fellow Yugoslav communists, but according to his own statements and published documents, he never denounced anyone, usually saying he did not know them. In one case, he was asked about the Croatian communist leader Kamilo Horvatin, but wrote ambiguously, saying that he did not know whether he was a Trotskyist. Nevertheless, Horvatin was not heard of again. While in Moscow, he was given the task of assisting Ćopić to translate the History of the Communist Party of the Soviet Union (Bolsheviks) into Serbo-Croatian, but they had only got to the second chapter when Ćopić too was arrested and executed. He worked on with a fellow surviving Yugoslav communist, but a Yugoslav communist of German ethnicity reported an inaccurate translation of a passage and claimed it showed Tito was a Trotskyist. Other influential communists vouched for him, and he was exonerated. A second Yugoslav communist denounced him, but the action backfired, and his accuser was arrested. Several factors were at play in his survival: his working-class origins, lack of interest in intellectual arguments about socialism, attractive personality, and capacity to make influential friends.

While Tito was avoiding arrest in Moscow, Germany was placing pressure on Czechoslovakia to cede the Sudetenland. In response to this threat, Tito organised a call for Yugoslav volunteers to fight for Czechoslovakia, and thousands of volunteers came to the Czechoslovak embassy in Belgrade to offer their services. Despite the eventual Munich Agreement and Czechoslovak acceptance of the annexation and the fact that the volunteers were turned away, Tito claimed credit for the Yugoslav response, which worked in his favour. By this stage, Tito was well aware of the realities in the Soviet Union, later saying he "witnessed a great many injustices" but was too heavily invested in communism and too loyal to the Soviet Union to step back. After restoring the image of a decisive, coherent and non-fractional CPY to the Comintern executives, Tito was by October 1938 reassured that the party would not be disestablished; he was then tasked to compile two resolutions on plans of future CPY activities. Hoping to return to Yugoslavia before the 1938 Yugoslavian parliamentary election in December, Tito requested permission to do so from Comintern's Georgi Dimitrov several times, saying that his stay in Moscow was greatly prolonged, but to no avail. The Comintern formally ratified his resolutions on 5 January 1939, and he was appointed General Secretary of the CPY. After his appointment to the party's highest position of leadership, the newly formed Politburo of the Central Committee retained the old leadership team of Tito, Kardelj, Đilas, Aleksandar Ranković, and Ivo Lola Ribar (the representative of SKOJ) and expanded it with Franc Leskošek, Miha Marinko and Josip Kraš, and by the end of 1939 and start of 1940, Rade Končar and Ivan Milutinović.

== World War II ==
=== Resistance in Yugoslavia ===
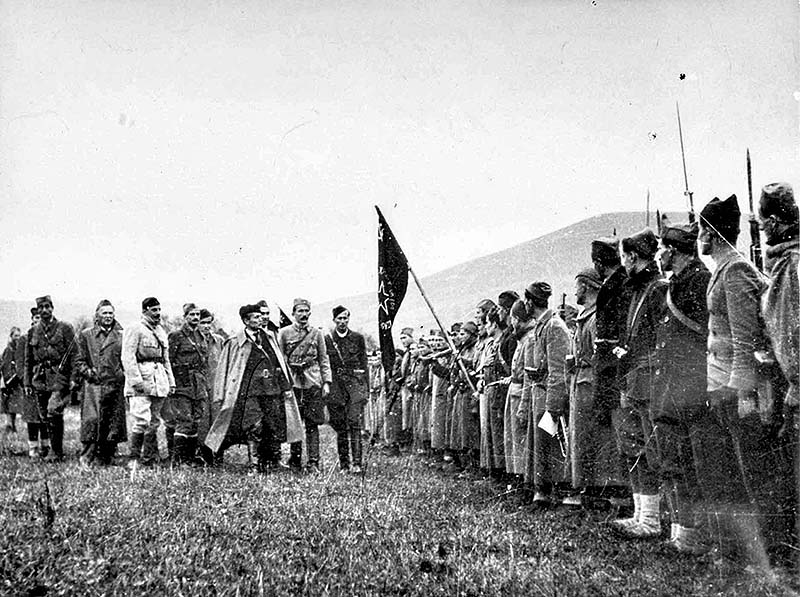
Tito inspects the 1st Proletarian Brigade. Next to him are: Ivan Ribar, Koča Popović, Filip Kljajić and Ivo Lola Ribar

Tito was in Zagreb, using the alias "Tomanek", when on 6 April 1941, Axis forces invaded Yugoslavia. On 10 April 1941, Slavko Kvaternik proclaimed the Independent State of Croatia, and Tito responded by forming a Military Committee within the Central Committee of the Communist Party of Yugoslavia (CPY). He smuggled himself—reportedly helped by Czech engineers—not out of the country but to Belgrade. Attacked from all sides, the armed forces of the Kingdom of Yugoslavia quickly crumbled. On 17 April 1941, after King Peter II and other members of the government fled the country, the remaining representatives of the government and military met with German officials in Belgrade. They quickly agreed to end military resistance. Prominent communist leaders, including Tito, held the May consultations to discuss the course of action to take in the face of the invasion. On 1 May 1941, Tito issued a pamphlet calling on the people to unite in a battle against the occupation. On 27 June 1941, the Central Committee appointed Tito commander-in-chief of all national liberation military forces. On 1 July 1941, Comintern sent precise instructions calling for immediate action.

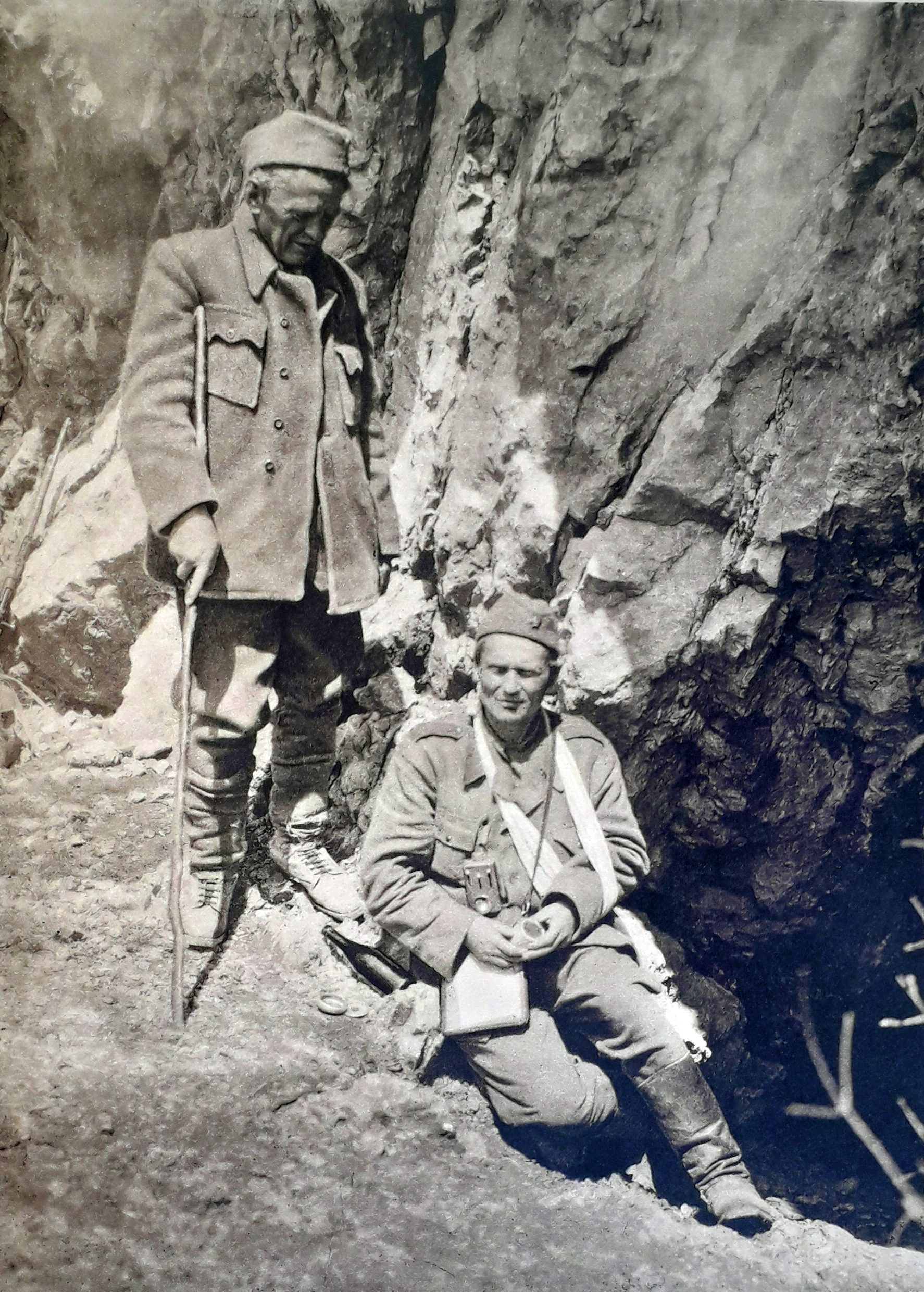
Tito and Ivan Ribar at Sutjeska in 1943

Tito stayed in Belgrade until 16 September 1941, when he, together with all members of the CPY, left Belgrade to travel to rebel-controlled territory. To leave Belgrade Tito used documents given to him by Dragoljub Milutinović, who was a voivode with the collaborationist Pećanac Chetniks. Since Pećanac was already fully co-operating with Germans by that time, this fact caused some to speculate that Tito left Belgrade with the blessing of the Germans because his task was to divide rebel forces, similar to Lenin's arrival in Russia. Tito travelled by train through Stalać and Čačak and arrived to the village of Robaje on 18 September 1941.

Despite conflicts with the rival monarchic Chetnik movement, Tito's Partisans succeeded in liberating territory, notably the "Republic of Užice". During this period, Tito held talks with Chetnik leader Draža Mihailović on 19 September and 27 October 1941. It is said that Tito ordered his forces to assist escaping Jews, and that more than 2,000 Jews fought directly for Tito.

On 21 December 1941, the Partisans created the First Proletarian Brigade (commanded by Koča Popović) and on 1 March 1942, Tito created the Second Proletarian Brigade. In liberated territories, the Partisans organised People's Committees to act as a civilian government. The Anti-Fascist Council of National Liberation of Yugoslavia (AVNOJ) convened in Bihać on 26–27 November 1942 and in Jajce on 29 November 1943. In the two sessions, the resistance representatives established the basis for the post-war organisation of the country, deciding on a federation of the Yugoslav nations. In Jajce, a 67-member "presidency" was elected and established a nine-member National Committee of Liberation (NKOJ; five communist members) as a de facto provisional government. Tito was named President of NKOJ.

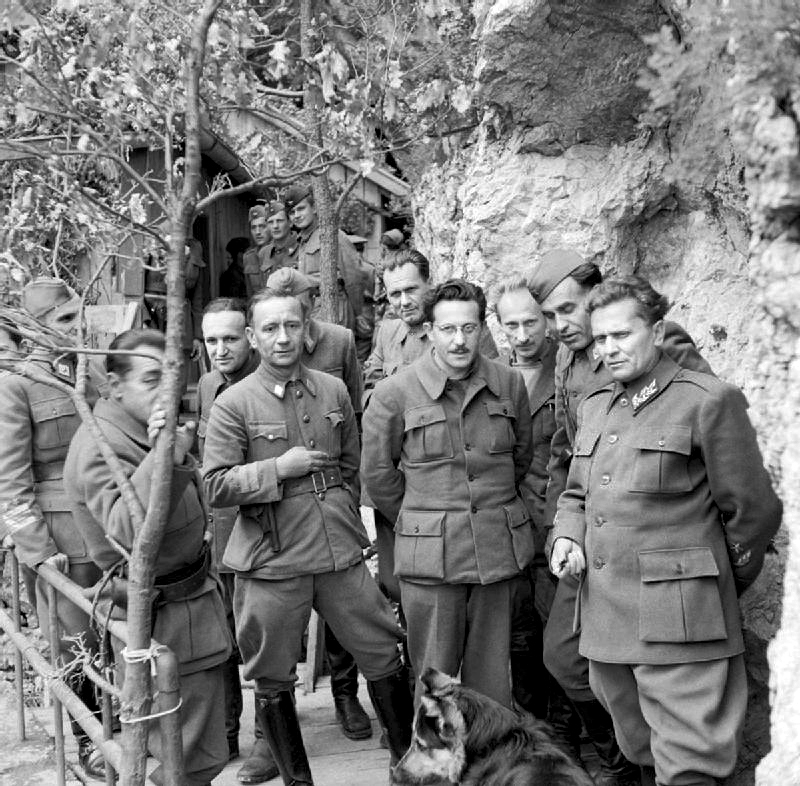
Tito and the Partisan Supreme Command, 14 May 1944

Tito supposedly revealed at Bihać his true identity as the old revolutionary Broz; he was otherwise a mystery. Mentions of "Tito" first appeared in Western newspapers in late 1943. C. L. Sulzberger warned in December 1943 that "Anyone who states with flat positiveness who Tito is, is talking through his hat. Not even the Allied liaison officers now stationed with him have that knowledge. The secret of Tito's identity is one of the best kept of this war", and mentioned theories that "Tito" was an alias for more than one person, even a woman. (Liaison officer Evelyn Waugh supposedly asked Tito whether the last theory was true. Tito reportedly answered "Well, if you were one, I could quickly prove that I am not".)

With the growing possibility of an Allied invasion in the Balkans, the Axis began to divert more resources to the destruction of the Partisans main force and its high command. The Germans offered 100,000 gold reichmarks for Tito's capture, and distributed numerous copies of a photograph they thought was his. On 25 May 1944, Tito managed to evade the Germans after the Raid on Drvar (Operation Rösselsprung), an airborne assault outside his Drvar headquarters in Bosnia.

After the Partisans managed to endure and avoid these intense attacks between January and June 1943, and the extent of Chetnik collaboration became evident, Allied leaders switched their support from Draža Mihailović to Tito. King Peter II, American President Franklin Roosevelt and British Prime Minister Winston Churchill joined Soviet Premier Joseph Stalin in officially recognising Tito and the Partisans at the Tehran Conference. This resulted in Allied aid being parachuted behind Axis lines to assist the Partisans. On 17 June 1944 on the Dalmatian island of Vis, the Treaty of Vis (Viški sporazum) was signed in an attempt to merge Tito's government (the AVNOJ) with the government in exile of King Peter II. The Balkan Air Force was formed in June 1944 to control operations that were mainly aimed at aiding his forces.

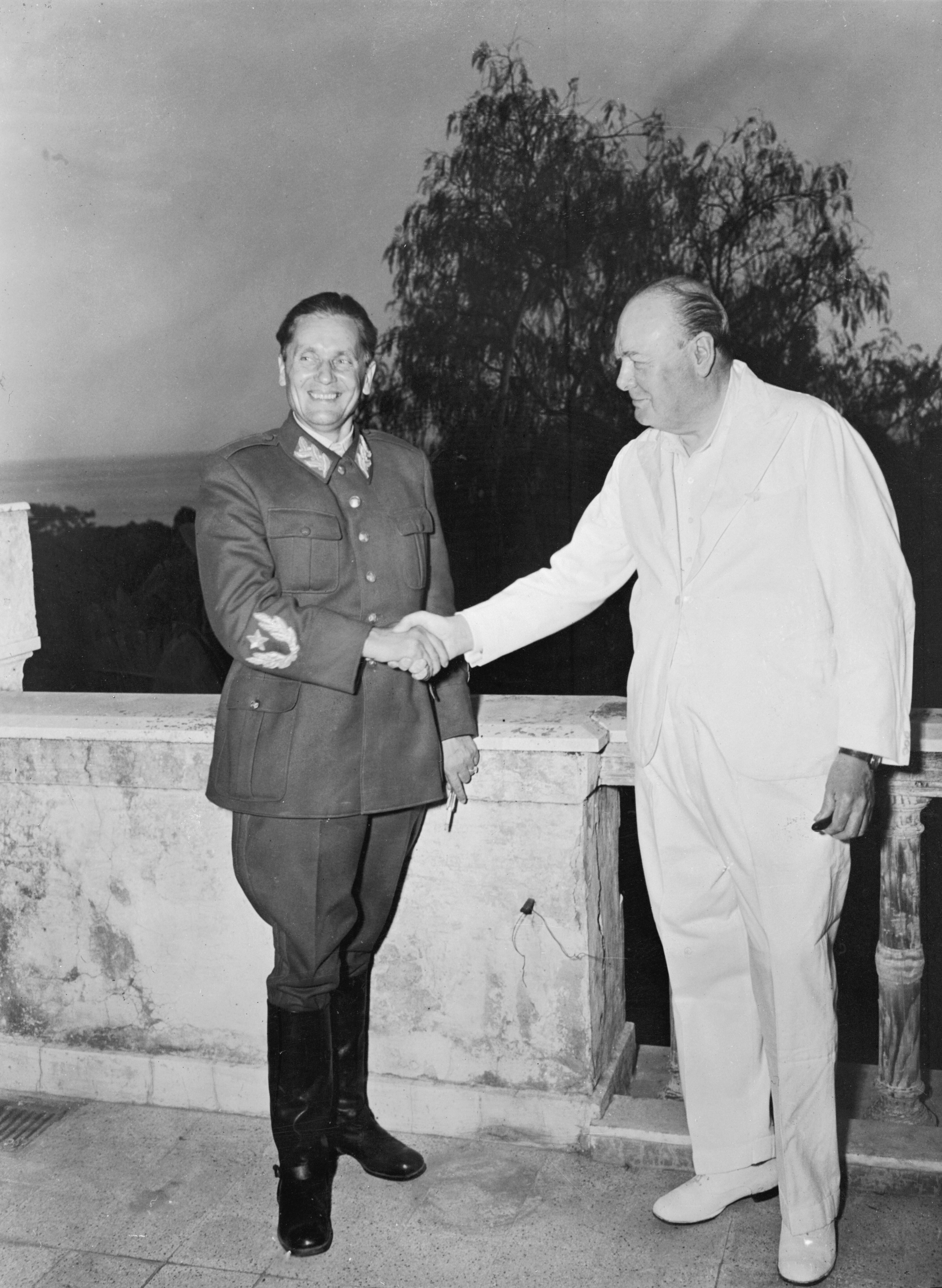
Tito and British prime minister Winston Churchill in 1944 in Naples, Italy

On 12 August 1944, Winston Churchill met Tito in Naples for a deal. On 12 September 1944, King Peter II called on all Yugoslavs to come together under Tito's leadership and stated that those who did not were "traitors", by which time Tito was recognised by all Allied authorities (including the government-in-exile) as the Prime Minister of Yugoslavia, in addition to the commander-in-chief of the Yugoslav forces. On 28 September 1944, the Telegraph Agency of the Soviet Union (TASS) reported that Tito signed an agreement with the Soviet Union allowing "temporary entry" of Soviet troops into Yugoslav territory, which allowed the Red Army to assist in operations in the northeastern areas of Yugoslavia. With their strategic right flank secured by the Allied advance, the Partisans prepared and executed a massive general offensive that succeeded in breaking through German lines and forcing a retreat beyond Yugoslav borders. After the Partisan victory and the end of hostilities in Europe, all external forces were ordered off Yugoslav territory.

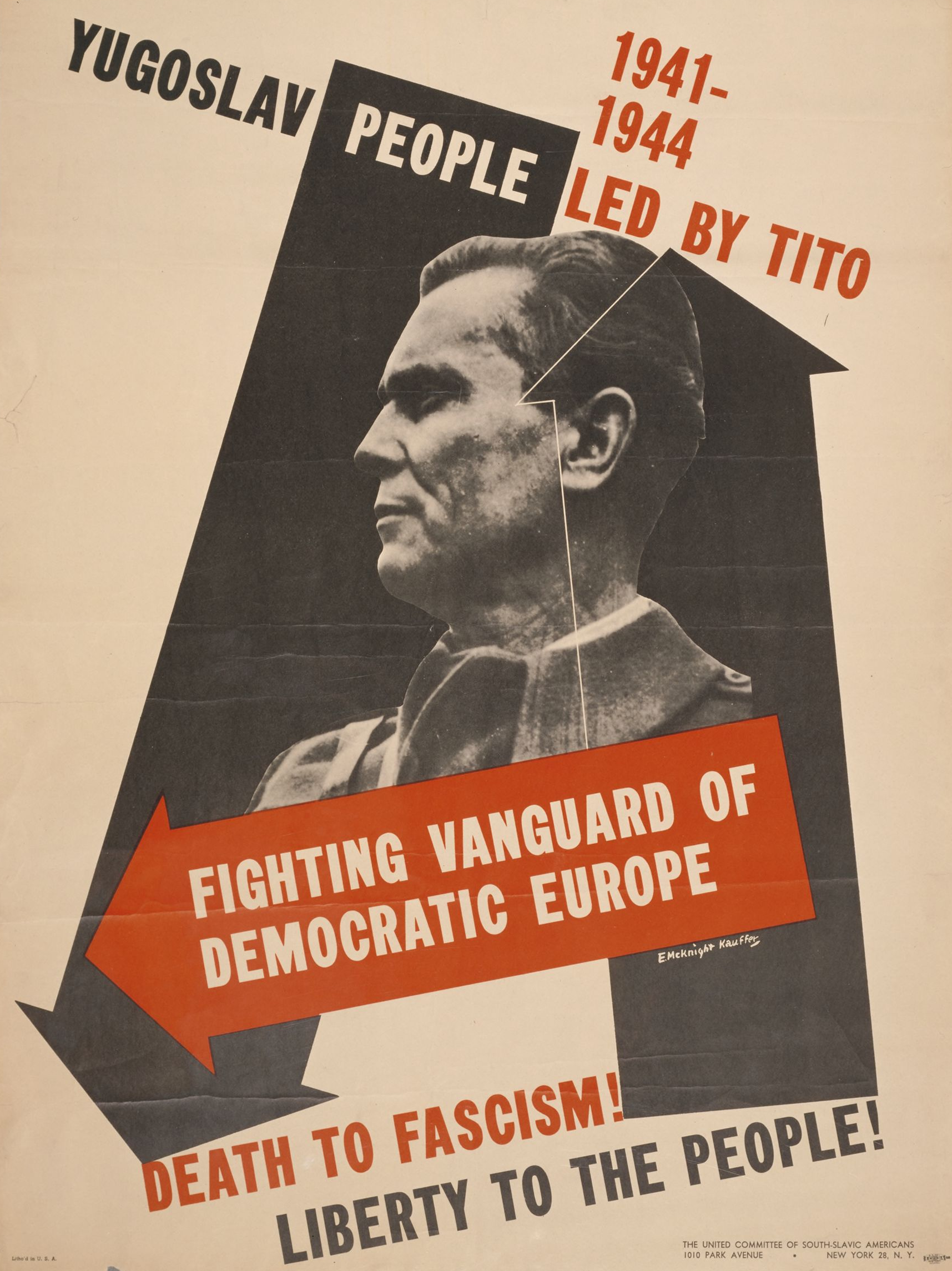
A poster by Edward McKnight Kauffer for the United Committee of South-Slavic Americans honoring Tito c. 1944

In the autumn of 1944, the communist leadership adopted a political decision on the expulsion of ethnic Germans from Yugoslavia. On 21 November, a special decree was issued on the confiscation and nationalisation of ethnic German property. To implement the decision, 70 camps were established in Yugoslav territory. In the final days of World War II in Yugoslavia, units of the Partisans were responsible for atrocities during Bleiburg repatriations, and accusations of culpability were later raised at the Yugoslav leadership under Tito. At the time, according to some scholars, Josip Broz Tito repeatedly issued calls for surrender to the retreating column, offering amnesty and attempting to avoid a disorderly surrender. On 14 May he dispatched a telegram to the supreme headquarters of the Slovene Partisan Army prohibiting the execution of prisoners of war and commanding the transfer of the possible suspects to a military court.

=== Aftermath ===
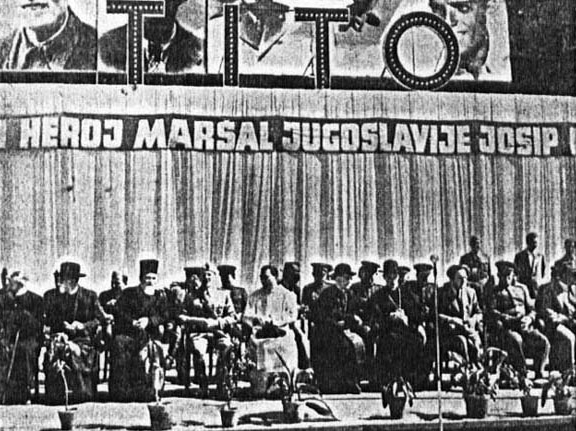
Celebration of liberation in Zagreb in 1945 dedicated to Tito, in presence of Orthodox dignitaries, the Catholic cardinal Aloysius Stepinac, and the Soviet military attaché

On 7 March 1945, the provisional government of the Democratic Federal Yugoslavia (DFY) was assembled in Belgrade by Josip Broz Tito, while the provisional name allowed for either a republic or monarchy. This government was headed by Tito as provisional Yugoslav Prime Minister and included representatives from the royalist government-in-exile, among others Ivan Šubašić. In accordance with the agreement between resistance leaders and the government-in-exile, post-war elections were held to determine the form of government. In November 1945, Tito's pro-republican People's Front, led by the Communist Party of Yugoslavia, won the elections with an overwhelming majority, the vote having been boycotted by monarchists. During the period, Tito evidently enjoyed massive popular support due to being generally viewed by the populace as the liberator of Yugoslavia. The Yugoslav administration in the immediate post-war period managed to unite a country that had been severely affected by ultra-nationalist upheavals and war devastation, while successfully suppressing the nationalist sentiments of the various nations in favour of tolerance, and the common Yugoslav goal. After the overwhelming electoral victory, Tito was confirmed as the Prime Minister and the Minister of Foreign Affairs of the DFY. The country was soon renamed the Federal People's Republic of Yugoslavia (FPRY) (later finally renamed into Socialist Federal Republic of Yugoslavia, SFRY). On 29 November 1945, King Peter II was formally deposed by the Yugoslav Constituent Assembly. The Assembly drafted the republican 1946 Yugoslav Constitution soon afterwards.

Yugoslavia organised the Yugoslav People's Army (Jugoslavenska narodna armija, JNA) from the Partisan movement and became the fourth strongest army in Europe at the time. The State Security Administration (Uprava državne bezbednosti, UDBA) was formed as the new secret police, along with a security agency, the Department of People's Security (Organ Zaštite Naroda (Armije), OZNA). Yugoslav intelligence was charged with imprisoning and bringing to trial large numbers of Nazi collaborators; controversially, this included catholic clergy involved with the Ustaše. Draža Mihailović was found guilty of collaboration, high treason and war crimes and was executed by firing squad in 1946.

Prime Minister Josip Broz Tito met with the president of the Bishops' Conference of Yugoslavia, Aloysius Stepinac on 4 June 1945, two days after his release from imprisonment. The two could not reach an agreement on the state of the Catholic Church. Under Stepinac's leadership, the bishops' conference released a letter condemning alleged Partisan war crimes in September 1945. The next year, Stepinac was arrested and put on trial, which some saw as a show trial. In October 1946, in its first special session for 75 years, the Vatican excommunicated Tito and the Yugoslav government for sentencing Stepinac to 16 years in prison on charges of assisting Ustaše terror and of supporting forced conversions of Serbs to Catholicism. Stepinac received preferential treatment in recognition of his status and the sentence was soon shortened and reduced to house arrest, with the option of emigration open to the archbishop. At the conclusion of the "Informbiro period", reforms rendered Yugoslavia considerably more religiously liberal than the Eastern Bloc states.

In the first post-war years, Tito was widely considered a communist leader very loyal to Moscow; indeed, he was often viewed as second only to Stalin in the Eastern Bloc. In fact, Stalin and Tito had an uneasy alliance from the start, with Stalin considering Tito too independent.

From 1946 to 1948, Tito actively engaged in building an alliance with neighbouring communist Albania, with the intent of incorporating Albania into Yugoslavia. According to Enver Hoxha, the then communist ruler of Albania, in the summer of 1946 Tito promised Hoxha that the Yugoslav province of Kosovo would be ceded to Albania. Despite the decision of unification being agreed upon by Yugoslav communists during the Bujan Conference, the plan never materialised. In the first post-war years in Kosovo, Tito enacted the policy of banning the return of Serb colonists to Kosovo, in addition to enacting the first large-scale primary education program of the Albanian language.

During the immediate post-war period, Tito's Yugoslavia had a strong commitment to orthodox Marxist ideas. Harsh repressive measures against dissidents and "enemies of the state" were common from government agents, although not known to be under Tito's orders, including "arrests, show trials, forced collectivisation, suppression of churches and religion". As the leader of Yugoslavia, Tito displayed a fondness for luxury, taking over the royal palaces that had belonged to the House of Karađorđević together with the former palaces used by the House of Habsburg in Yugoslavia. His tours across Yugoslavia in his luxury Blue Train closely resembled the royal tours of the Karađorđević kings and Habsburg emperors and in Serbia. He also adopted the traditional royal custom of being a godfather to every 9th son, although he modified it to include daughters as well after criticism was made that the practice was sexist. Just like a Serbian king, Tito would appear wherever a 9th child was born to a family to congratulate the parents and give them cash. Tito always spoke very harshly of the Karađorđević kings in both public and private (through in private, he sometimes had a kind word for the Habsburgs), but in many ways, he appeared to his people as sort of a king.

== Presidency ==
=== Tito–Stalin split ===
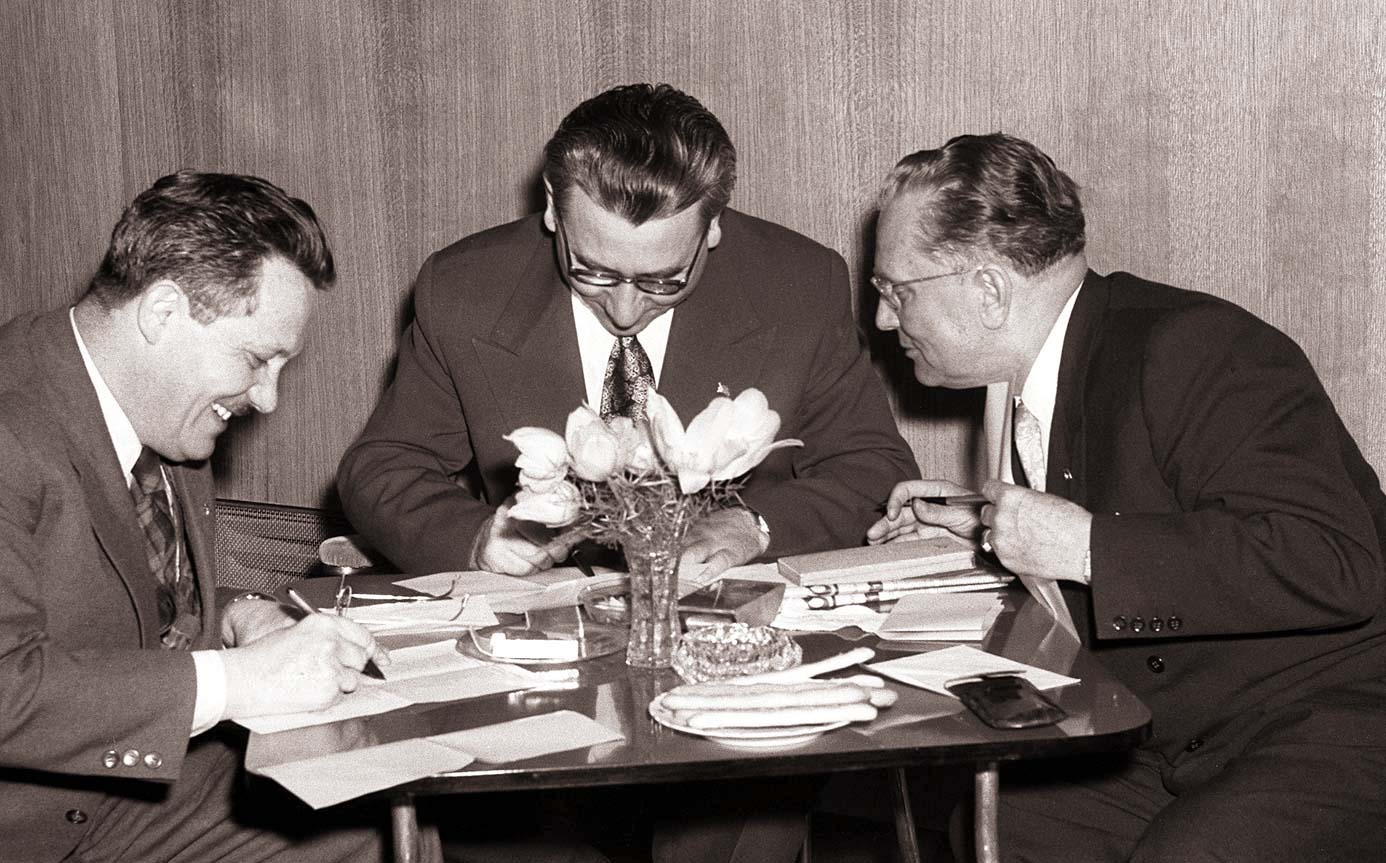
Edvard Kardelj, Aleksandar Ranković and Tito in 1958

Unlike other states in east-central Europe liberated by allied forces, Yugoslavia liberated itself from Axis domination with limited support from the Red Army. Tito's leading role in liberating Yugoslavia not only strengthened his position in his party and among Yugoslavians, but caused him to be insistent that Yugoslavia had more room to follow its interests than other Bloc leaders, who had more reasons to recognise Soviet efforts in liberating their countries. Although Tito was formally an ally of Stalin after World War II, the Soviets set up a spy ring in the Yugoslav party as early as 1945, giving way to an uneasy alliance.

In the aftermath of World War II, armed incidents occurred between Yugoslavia and the Western Allies. Yugoslavia acquired the Italian territory of Istria as well as the cities of Zadar and Rijeka. Yugoslav leadership was looking to incorporate Trieste as well, which was opposed by the Western Allies. This led to armed incidents, notably attacks by Yugoslav fighter planes on US transport aircraft, causing criticism from the West. In 1946, the Yugoslav Air Force shot down two US transport aircraft. The passengers and crew of the first plane were secretly interned by the Yugoslav government. The second plane and its crew were a total loss. The US was outraged and sent an ultimatum to the Yugoslav government, demanding release of the Americans in custody, U.S. access to the downed planes, and full investigation of the incidents. Stalin was opposed to what he felt were provocations, as he believed the USSR unready to face the West in open war so soon after World War II and when U.S. had operational nuclear weapons, whereas the USSR had yet to conduct its first test. Tito was openly supportive of the communists in the Greek Civil War, while Stalin kept his distance, having agreed with Churchill not to pursue Soviet interests there, though he did support the Greek communists politically, as demonstrated in several assemblies of the UN Security Council. In 1948, motivated by the desire to create a strong independent economy, Tito modelled his development plan independently from Moscow, which resulted in a diplomatic escalation followed by a bitter exchange of letters in which Tito wrote that "We study and take as an example the Soviet system, but we are developing socialism in our country in somewhat different forms".

The Soviet answer on 4 May admonished Tito and the Communist Party of Yugoslavia (CPY) for failing to admit and correct its mistakes and accused them of being too proud of their successes against the Germans, maintaining that the Red Army had saved them. Tito's response on 17 May suggested the matter be settled at the meeting of the Cominform to be held that June. However, Tito did not attend the second meeting of the Cominform, fearing Yugoslavia was to be openly attacked. In 1949 the crisis nearly escalated into armed conflict, as Hungarian and Soviet forces were massing on the northern Yugoslav frontier. An invasion of Yugoslavia was planned for 1949, via the combined forces of neighbouring Soviet satellite states of Hungary, Romania, Bulgaria and Albania, followed by the removal of Tito's government. On 28 June, the other member countries of the Cominform expelled Yugoslavia, citing "nationalist elements" that had "managed in the course of the past...six months to reach a dominant position in the leadership" of the CPY. The Hungarian and Romanian armies were expanded in size and, together with Soviet ones, massed on the Yugoslav border. The assumption in Moscow was that once it was known he had lost Soviet approval, Tito would collapse; "I will shake my little finger, and there will be no more Tito," Stalin remarked. The expulsion banished Yugoslavia from the Soviet-friendly bloc, while other socialist states of Eastern Europe underwent purges of alleged "Titoists". Stalin took the matter personally and arranged assassination attempts on Tito, none of which succeeded. Tito was well aware of Stalin's hostility and equally defiant, writing to the Soviet leader:

Stalin. Stop sending assassins to murder me. We have already caught five, one with a bomb, another with a rifle. [...] If this doesn't stop, I will send one man to Moscow and there will be no need to send another.

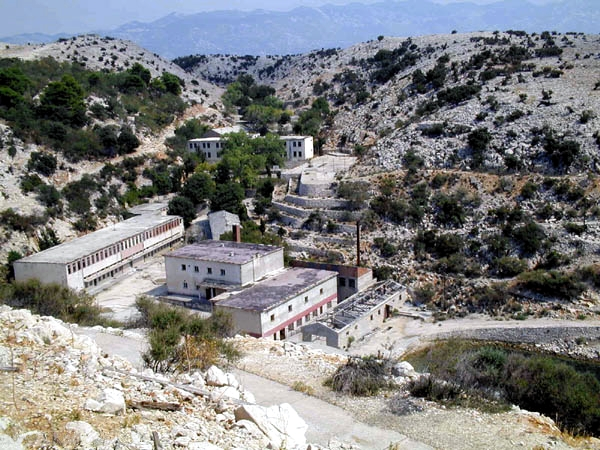
The Goli Otok prison

One consequence of the tension between Yugoslavia and the Soviet Union was Tito's decision to begin large-scale repression against enemies of the government. This repression was not limited to known and alleged Stalinists, but included members of the Communist Party, or anyone exhibiting sympathy towards the Soviet Union. Prominent partisans, such as Vlado Dapčević, were victims of this repression, which lasted until 1956 and was marked by violations of human rights. Tens of thousands of political opponents served in forced labour camps, such as Goli Otok (Barren Island), and hundreds died. A disputed, but feasible number, put forth by the Yugoslav government in 1964, places the number of Goli Otok inmates incarcerated between 1948 and 1956 to be 16,554, with fewer than 600 having died during detention. The facilities at Goli Otok were abandoned in 1956, and jurisdiction of the now-defunct political prison was handed over to the government of the People's Republic of Croatia.

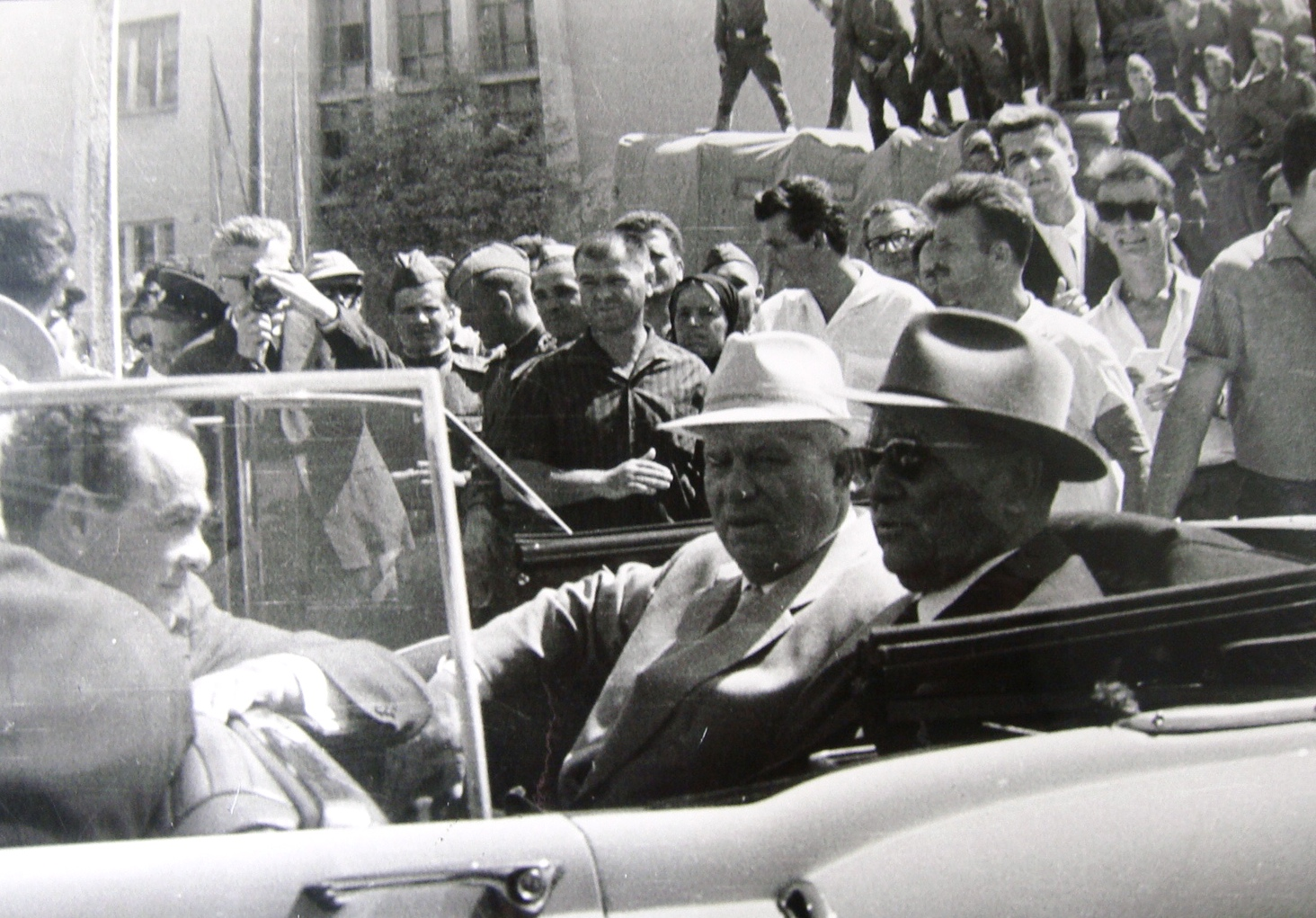
Tito and Soviet leader Nikita Khrushchev in Skopje after the 1963 earthquake

Tito's estrangement from the USSR enabled Yugoslavia to obtain US aid via the Economic Cooperation Administration (ECA). Still, Tito did not agree to align with the West, which was a common consequence of accepting American aid. After Stalin's death in 1953, relations with the USSR relaxed, and Tito began to receive aid from the Comecon as well. In this way, Tito played East–West antagonism to his advantage. Instead of choosing sides, he was instrumental in kick-starting the Non-Aligned Movement, which functioned as a "third way" for countries interested in staying outside the East–West divide.

The event was significant not only for Yugoslavia, but for the global development of socialism. It was the first major split between Communist states, casting doubt on Comintern's claims for socialism to be a unified force that would eventually control the world, as Tito became the first, and only successful, socialist leader to defy Stalin's leadership in the Cominform. This rift with the Soviet Union brought Tito international recognition, but triggered instability often referred to as the Informbiro period. Tito's form of communism was labelled "Titoism" by Moscow, which encouraged purges and repression against suspected and accused "Titoites" throughout the Eastern Bloc. Some Trotskyists considered Tito to be an 'unconscious Trotskyist' because of the split. However, this was rejected by Ted Grant in 1949 who asserted there were no fundamental principled differences between Stalin and Tito. He said they were both 'proletarian Bonapartists' ruling deformed workers' states – Tito modelling his regime on that of Stalin's.

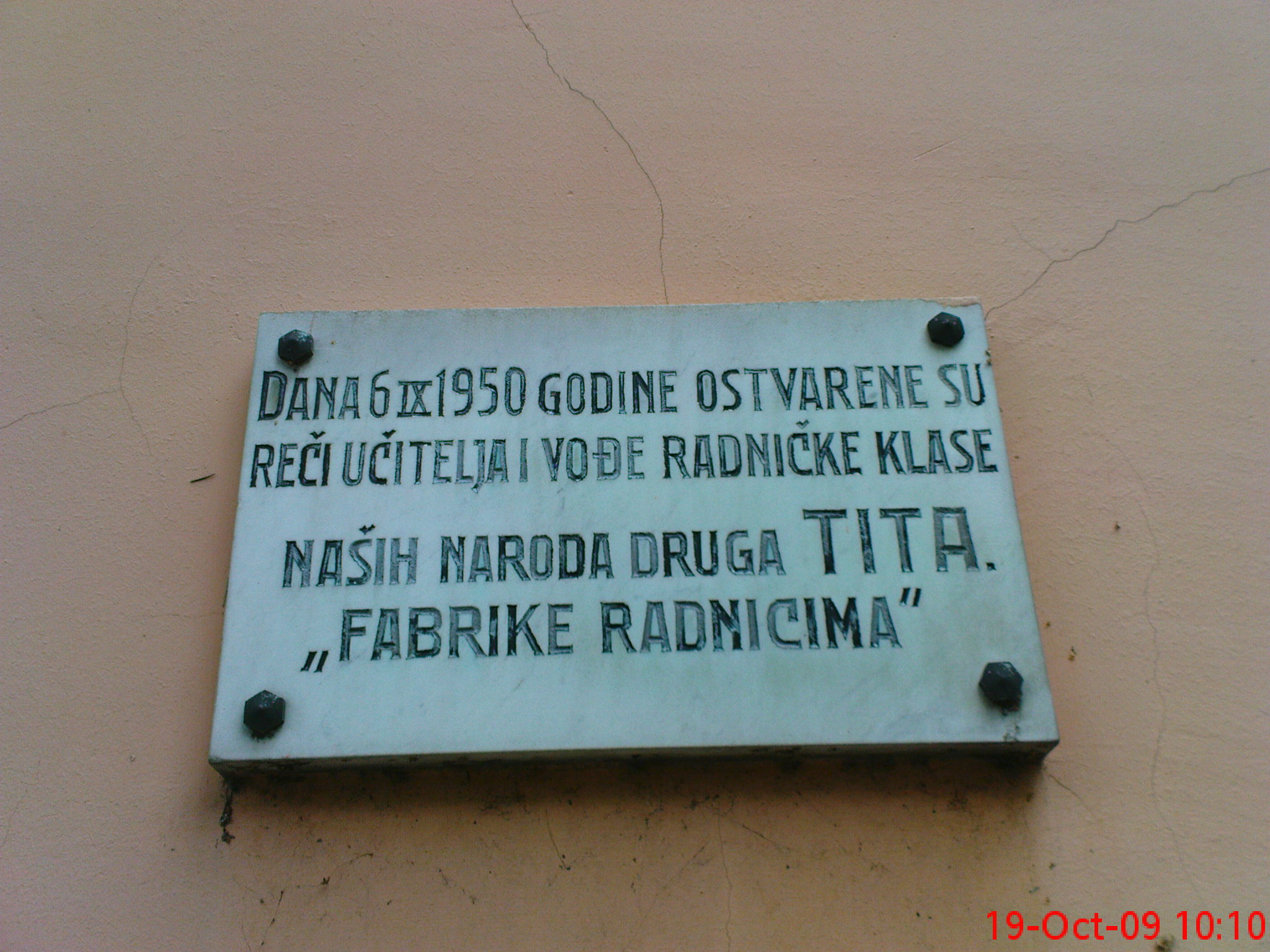
"Fabrike radnicima" ("Factories to the workers") as declared by Tito was the slogan of the Yugoslav socialist self-management system

In June 1950, the National Assembly supported a crucial bill written by Milovan Đilas and Tito regarding "socialist self-management", a type of cooperative independent socialist experiment that introduced profit sharing and workplace democracy in previously state-run enterprises, which then came under direct social ownership of the employees. On 13 January 1953, they established that the law on self-management was the basis of the social order in Yugoslavia. Tito succeeded Ivan Ribar as the President of Yugoslavia on 14 January 1953, becoming the official head of state. After Stalin's death, Tito rejected the USSR's invitation for a visit to discuss the normalisation of relations between the two nations. Nikita Khrushchev and Nikolai Bulganin visited Tito in Belgrade in 1955 and apologised for wrongdoings by Stalin, signing the Belgrade declaration. Tito visited the USSR in 1956, which signalled to the world that animosity between Yugoslavia and USSR was easing. Rapprochement between the two countries would not last long, as Yugoslav leadership took an increasingly explicit posture of non-alignment in the aftermath of the Hungarian Revolution of 1956. Relations further deteriorated in the 1960s because of Yugoslav economic reforms which consciously linked Yugoslavia to the international system, as well as Tito's support for the Prague Spring, which found much of its inspiration in Yugoslav market socialism, and opposition to the subsequent Warsaw Pact invasion of Czechoslovakia.

The Tito–Stalin split had large ramifications for countries outside the USSR and Yugoslavia. It has, for example, been given as one of the reasons for the Slánský trial in Czechoslovakia, in which 14 high-level Communist officials were purged, with 11 of them being executed. Stalin put pressure on Czechoslovakia to conduct purges to discourage the spread of the idea of a "national path to socialism", which Tito espoused.

=== Non-Alignment ===
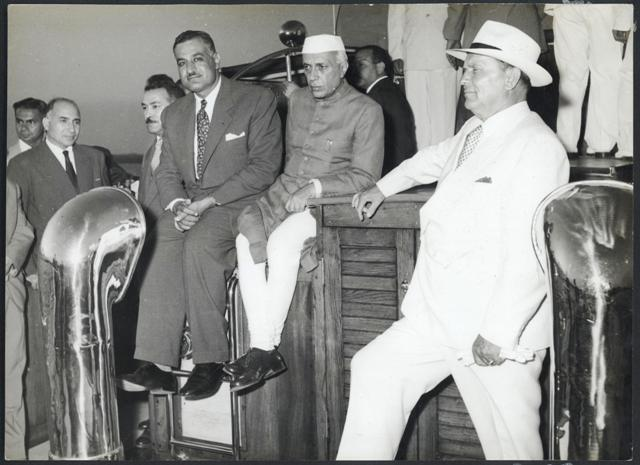
Tito receiving Indian prime minister Jawaharlal Nehru and Egyptian president Gamal Abdel Nasser in Belgrade, 1961

Under Tito's leadership, Yugoslavia became a founding member of the Non-Aligned Movement. In 1961, Tito co-founded the movement with Egypt's Gamal Abdel Nasser, India's Jawaharlal Nehru, Indonesia's Sukarno and Ghana's Kwame Nkrumah, in an action called The Initiative of Five, thus establishing strong ties with Third World countries. This move improved Yugoslavia's diplomatic position. Tito saw the Non-Aligned Movement as a way of presenting himself as a world leader of an important bloc, that would improve his bargaining power with the eastern and western blocs. In September 1961, Tito became the first Secretary-General of the Non-Aligned Movement.

Tito's foreign policy led to relationships with various governments, such as exchanging visits with Emperor Haile Selassie of Ethiopia, where a street was named in his honour. In 1953, Tito visited Ethiopia, and in 1954, the Emperor visited Yugoslavia. Tito's motives in befriending Ethiopia were self-interested as he wanted to send graduates of Yugoslav universities (whose standards were lower than Western universities, thus making them unemployable in the West) to work in Ethiopia, one of the few countries willing to accept them. As Ethiopia did not have much of a health care or university system, Selassie, from 1953 encouraged Yugoslav graduates, especially with medical degrees, to work in his empire. Reflecting his tendency to pursue closer ties with Third World nations, from 1950 Tito permitted Mexican films to be shown in Yugoslavia, where they became popular, especially Un día de vida, which became a hit when it premiered in Yugoslavia in 1952. The success of Mexican films led to the "Yu-Mex" craze of the 1950s–60s as Mexican music became popular, and it was fashionable for Yugoslav musicians to don sombreros and sing Mexican songs in Serbo-Croatian.

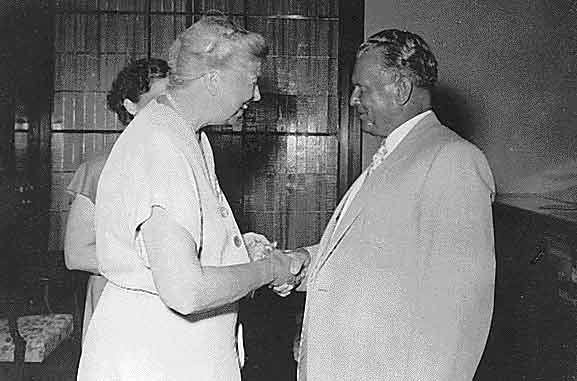
Josip Broz Tito greeting former U.S. first lady Eleanor Roosevelt during her July 1953 visit to Yugoslavia

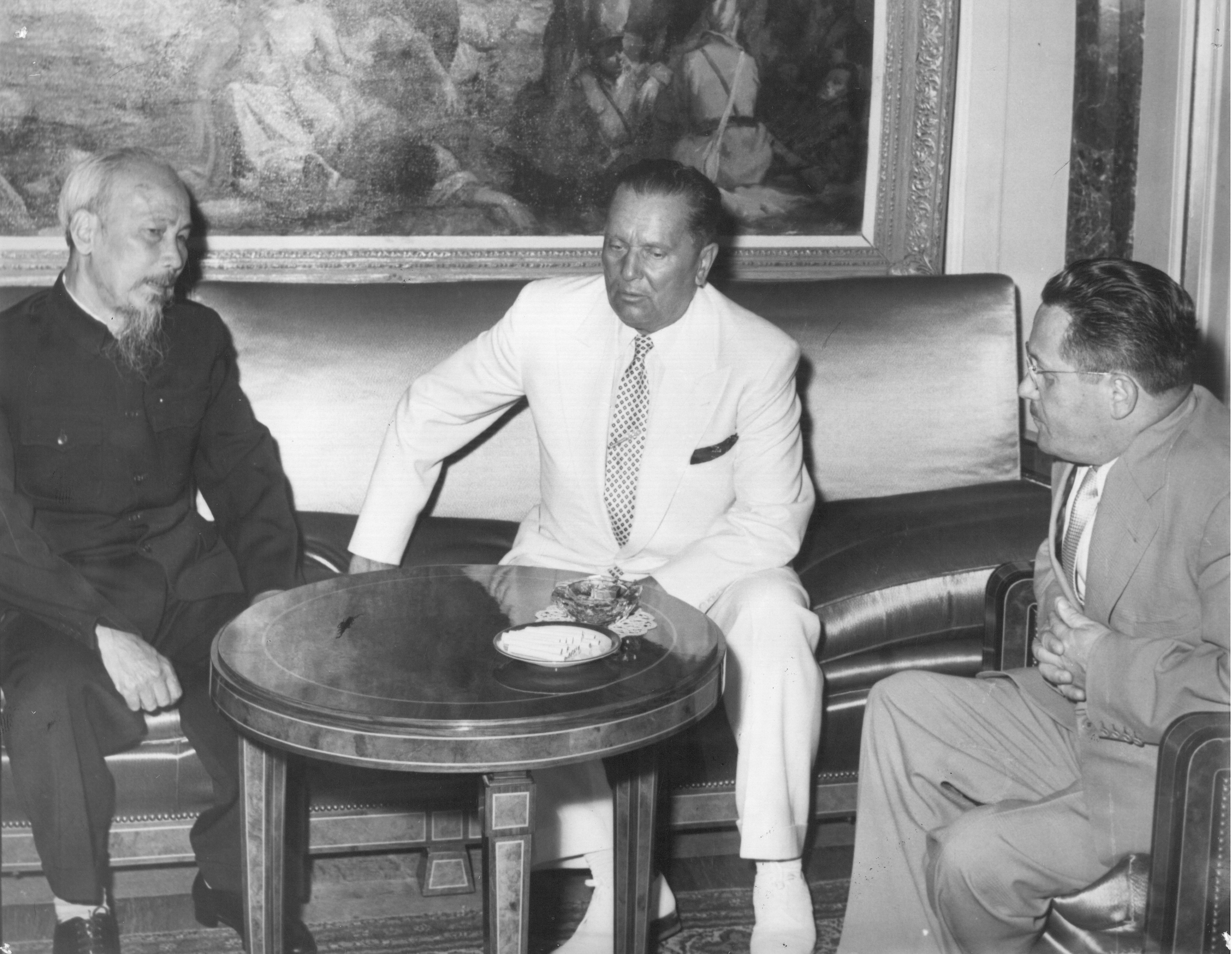
Tito with North Vietnamese leader Ho Chi Minh in Belgrade, 1957

Tito was notable for pursuing a foreign policy of neutrality during the Cold War and establishing ties with developing countries. Tito's belief in self-determination caused the 1948 rift with Stalin and, consequently, the Eastern Bloc. His speeches often reiterated that neutrality, and co-operation with all countries, would be natural as long as they did not use their influence to pressure Yugoslavia to take sides. Relations with Western nations were generally cordial.

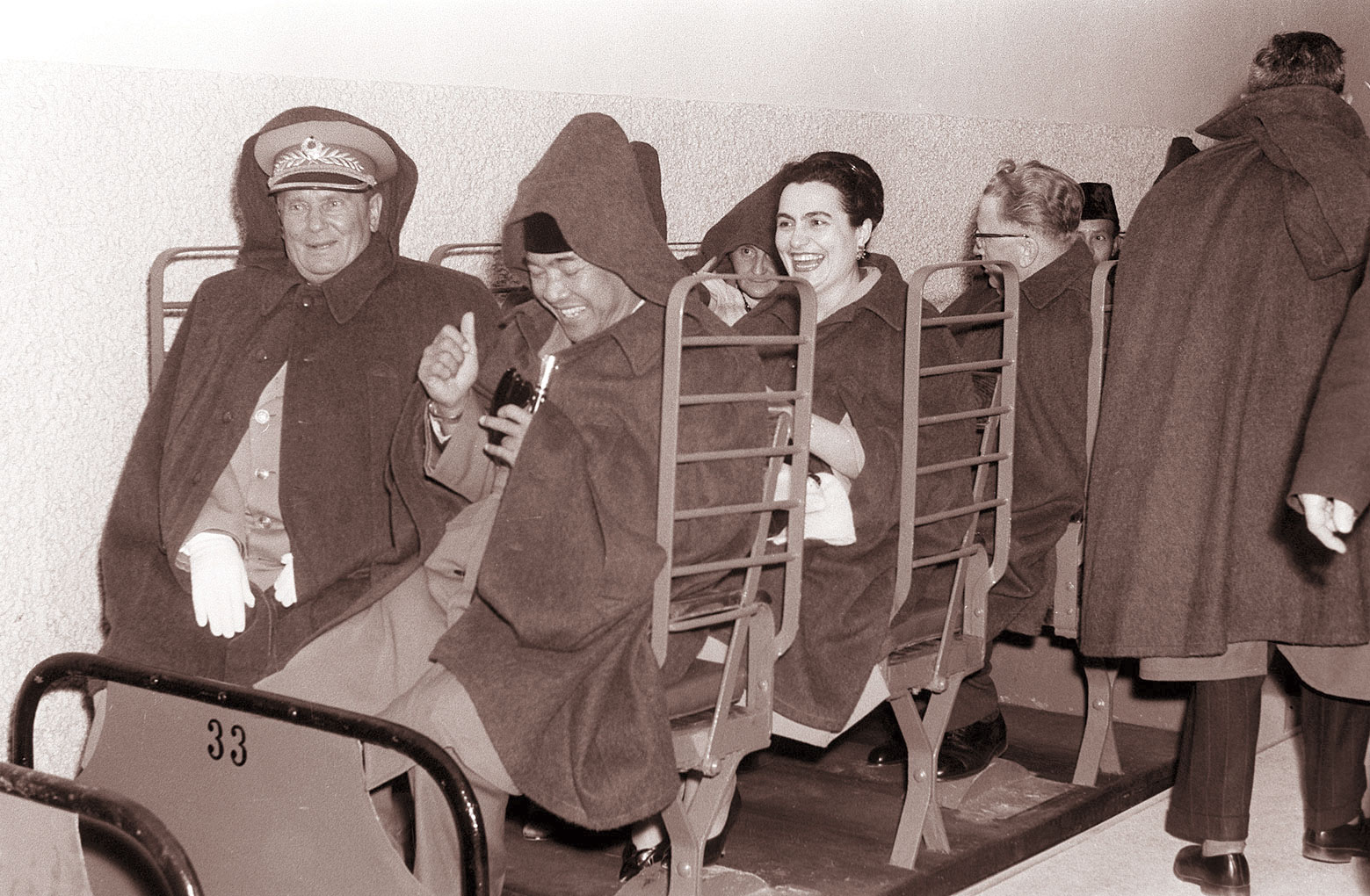
Tito and Sukarno at the Postojna Cave, 1960

In the early 1950s, Yugoslav-Hungarian relations were strained as Tito made little secret of his distaste for the Stalinist Mátyás Rákosi, and his preference for the "national communist" Imre Nagy. Tito's decision to create a "Balkan Pact (1953)" by signing an alliance with NATO members Turkey and Greece was regarded as tantamount to joining NATO in Soviet eyes, and his vague talk of a neutralist Communist federation of Eastern European states was seen as a threat in Moscow. The Yugoslav embassy in Budapest was seen by the Soviets as a centre of subversion in Hungary, they accused Yugoslav diplomats and journalists, sometimes with justification, of supporting Nagy. However, when the Hungarian Revolution of 1956 broke out, Tito accused Nagy of losing control, as he wanted a Communist Hungary independent of the Soviet Union, not the overthrow of Hungarian communism. On 31 October 1956, Tito ordered the Yugoslav media to stop praising Nagy and he quietly supported the Soviet intervention on 4 November to end the revolt, as he believed that a Hungary ruled by anti-communists would pursue irredentist claims against Yugoslavia, as had been the case during the interwar period. To escape from the Soviets, Nagy fled to the Yugoslav embassy, where Tito granted him asylum. On 5 November, Soviet tanks shelled the Yugoslav embassy in Budapest, killing the Yugoslav cultural attache and other diplomats. Tito's refusal to turn over Nagy, despite increasingly shrill Soviet demands, served his purposes well with Western relations, as he was presented in the West as the "good communist" who stood up to Moscow. On 22 November, Nagy and his cabinet left the embassy on a bus that took them into exile in Yugoslavia, after the new Hungarian leader, János Kádár, promised Tito in writing they would not be harmed. Much to Tito's fury, when the bus left the embassy, it was boarded by KGB agents who arrested the Hungarian leaders. Nagy's execution almost led Yugoslavia to break off diplomatic relations with the Soviet Union, and in 1957 Tito boycotted the Moscow ceremonies for the 40th anniversary of the October Revolution, the only communist leader who did not attend.

Yugoslavia had a liberal travel policy permitting foreigners to freely travel through the country and its citizens to travel worldwide, whereas it was limited by most Communist countries. Yugoslav citizens worked throughout Western Europe. Tito met many world leaders during his rule, such as Soviet rulers Joseph Stalin, Nikita Khrushchev and Leonid Brezhnev; Egypt's Gamal Abdel Nasser, Indian politicians Jawaharlal Nehru and Indira Gandhi; British Prime Ministers Winston Churchill, James Callaghan and Margaret Thatcher; U.S. Presidents Dwight D. Eisenhower, John F. Kennedy, Richard Nixon, Gerald Ford and Jimmy Carter. Other leaders and heads of state that Tito met included Che Guevara, Fidel Castro, Yasser Arafat, Pierre Trudeau, Willy Brandt, Helmut Schmidt, Georges Pompidou, Elizabeth II, Hua Guofeng, Kim Il Sung, Sukarno, Sheikh Mujibur Rahman, Suharto, Kenneth Kaunda, Gaddafi, Erich Honecker, Nicolae Ceaușescu, János Kádár, Saddam Hussein and Urho Kekkonen. He also met celebrities.

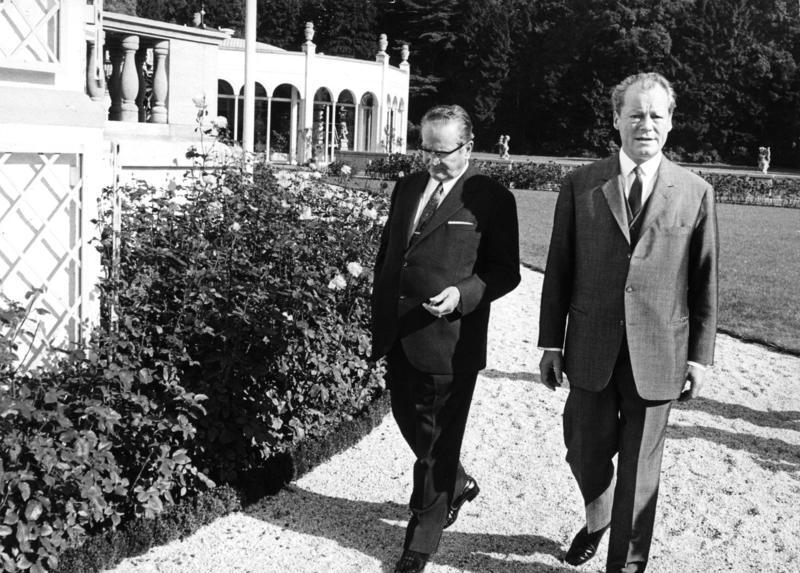
Tito and German chancellor Willy Brandt in Bonn, 11 October 1970

Yugoslavia provided major assistance to anti-colonialist movements in the Third World. The Yugoslav delegation was the first to bring the demands of the Algerian National Liberation Front (FLN) to the UN. In January 1958, the French Navy boarded the Slovenija cargo ship off Oran, whose holds were filled with weapons for the insurgents. Diplomat Danilo Milić explained that "Tito and the leading nucleus of the League of Communists of Yugoslavia really saw in the Third World's liberation struggles, a replica of their own struggle against the fascist occupants. They vibrated to the rhythm of the advances or setbacks of the FLN or Viet Cong."

Thousands of Yugoslav military advisors travelled to Guinea after its decolonisation and as the French government tried to destabilise the country. Tito covertly helped left-wing liberation movements to destabilise the Portuguese Empire. He saw the murder of Patrice Lumumba in 1961 as the "greatest crime in contemporary history". The country's military academies hosted left-wing activists from SWAPO (Namibia) and the Pan Africanist Congress of Azania (South Africa) as part of Tito's efforts to undermine apartheid. In 1980, the intelligence services of South Africa and Argentina plotted to return the 'favour', by covertly bringing 1,500 anti-urban communist guerrillas to Yugoslavia. The operation was aimed at overthrowing Tito and was planned during the 1980 Summer Olympics in Moscow so that the Soviets would be too busy to react. The operation was abandoned due to Tito's death.

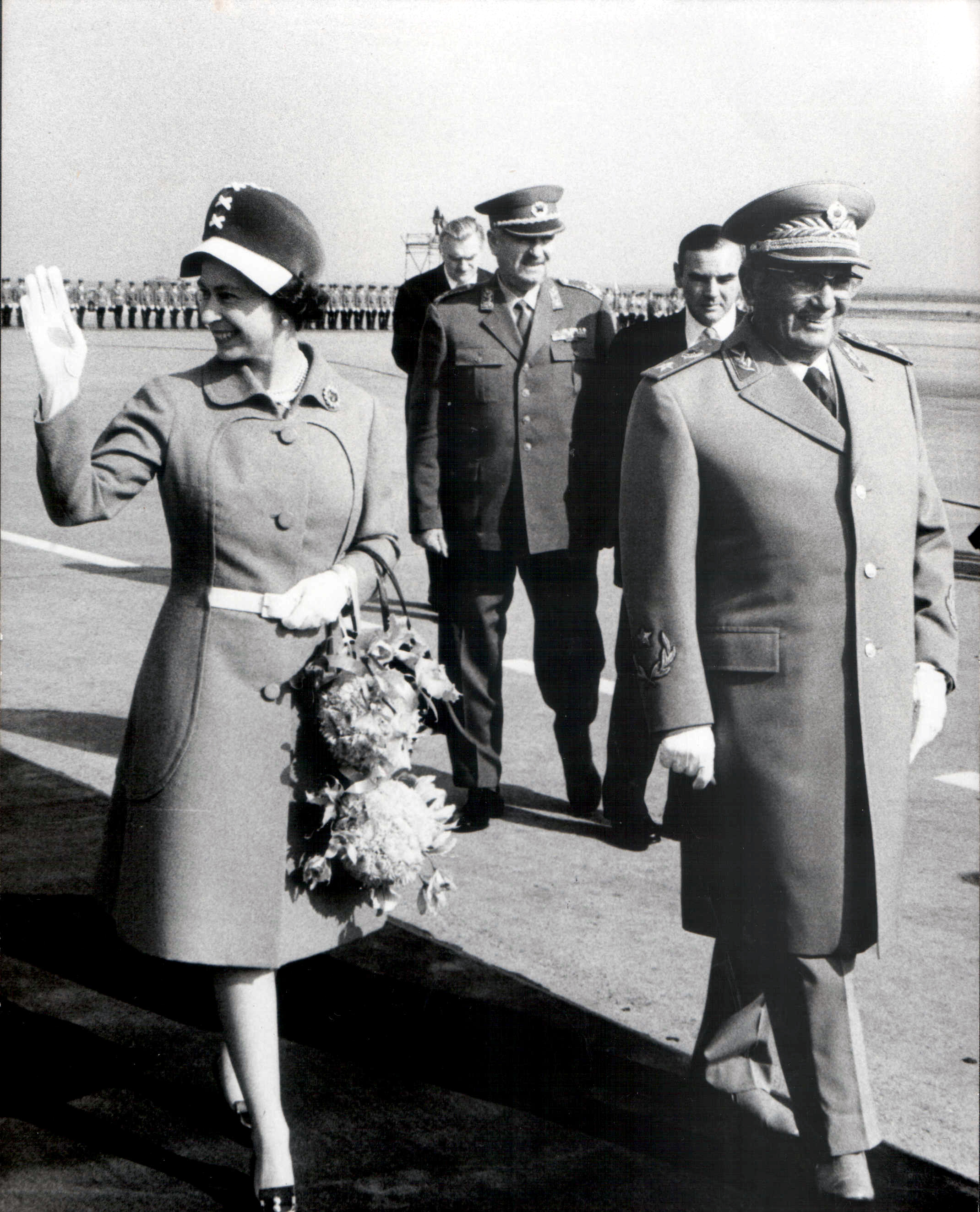
Tito with Elizabeth II in Belgrade, 1972

In 1953, Tito travelled to Britain for a state visit and met with Winston Churchill. He also toured Cambridge and visited the University Library. Tito visited India from December 1954 to January 1955. After his return, he removed many restrictions on Yugoslavia's churches and spiritual institutions.

Tito developed warm relations with Burma under U Nu, travelling to the country in 1955 and 1959, though he did not receive the same treatment in 1959 from the new leader, Ne Win. Tito had a close friendship with Prince Norodom Sihanouk of Cambodia, who preached an eccentric mixture of monarchism, Buddhism and socialism, and, like Tito, wanted his country to be neutral in the Cold War. Tito saw Sihanouk as a kindred soul who, like him, had to struggle to maintain his backward country's neutrality in the face of rival blocs. By contrast, Tito disliked President Idi Amin of Uganda, whom he saw as thuggish and possibly insane.

Because of its neutrality, Yugoslavia was rare among Communist countries in having diplomatic relations with right-wing, anti-communist governments. Yugoslavia was the only communist country that had diplomatic relations with Alfredo Stroessner's Paraguay. Yugoslavia sold arms to the staunchly anti-communist regime of Guatemala under Kjell Eugenio Laugerud García, during the Guatemalan Civil War. Notable exceptions to Yugoslavia's neutral stance toward anti-communist countries include Spain under Franco, the Greek junta, and Chile under Pinochet; Yugoslavia was one of many countries that severed diplomatic relations with Chile after Salvador Allende was overthrown.

=== Reforms ===
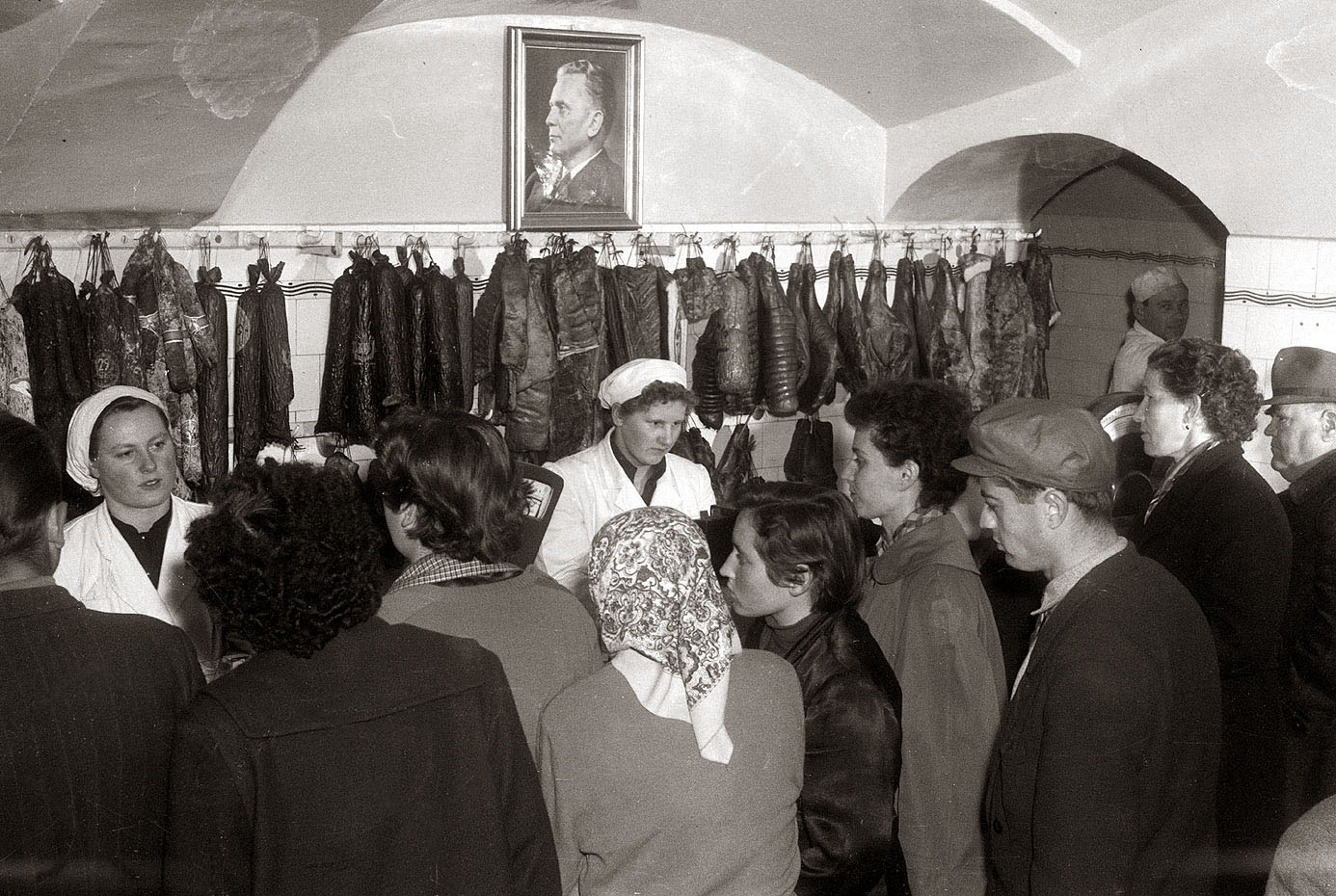
A butcher shop in Maribor adorned with a portrait of Tito, 1957

Starting in the 1950s, Tito's government permitted Yugoslav workers to go to western Europe, especially West Germany, as Gastarbeiter ("guest workers"). The exposure of many Yugoslavs to the West and its culture led many Yugoslavians to view themselves as culturally closer to Western Europe than Eastern Europe. In the autumn of 1960, Tito met President Dwight D. Eisenhower at the United Nations General Assembly meeting. They discussed a range of issues from arms control to economic development. When Eisenhower remarked that Yugoslavia's neutrality was "neutral on his side", Tito replied that neutrality did not imply passivity but meant "not taking sides". On 7 April 1963, the country changed its official name from "Federal People's Republic" to "Socialist Federal Republic" of Yugoslavia. Economic reforms encouraged small-scale private enterprise (up to five full-time workers; most of these were family businesses and largest in agriculture) and greatly relaxed restrictions on religious expression. Tito subsequently toured the Americas. In Chile, two government ministers resigned over his visit to that country.

At the beginning of the 1960s, foreign observers noted that the country was “booming” and that, meanwhile, Yugoslav citizens enjoyed far greater freedoms than those in the Soviet Union and other countries of the Eastern Bloc. Literacy increased exponentially and reached 91%, healthcare was free at all levels, and life expectancy rose to 72 years.

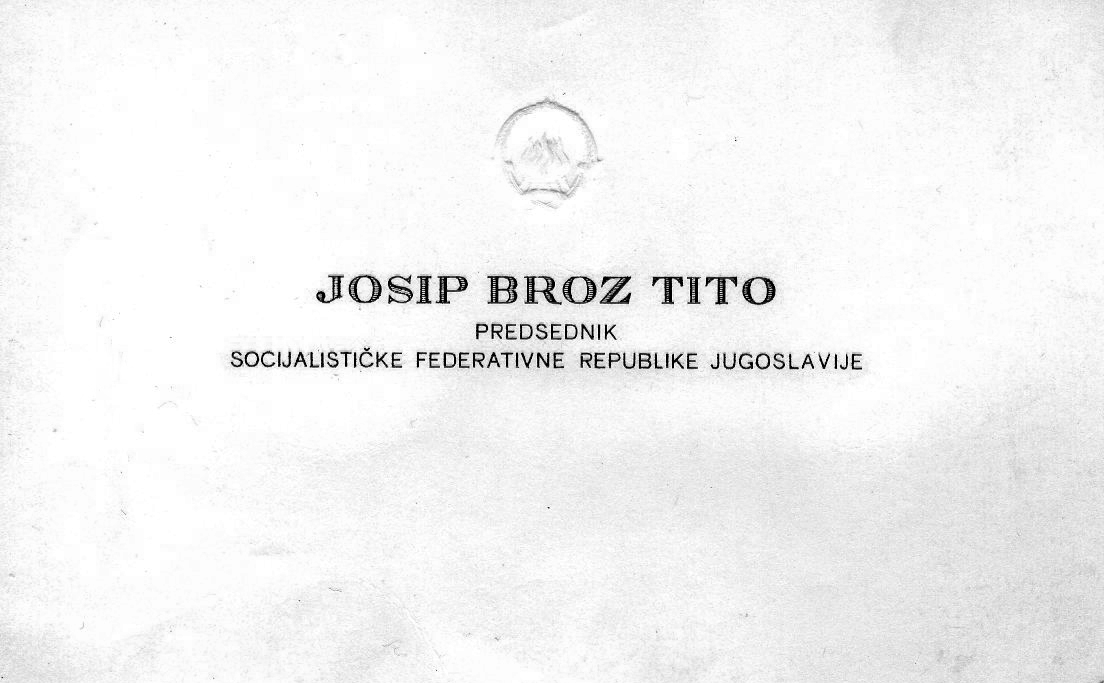
Tito's calling card from 1967

In 1966, an agreement with the Holy See, fostered in part by the death in 1960 of the anti-communist archbishop of Zagreb Aloysius Stepinac and shifts in the church's approach to resisting communism originating in the Second Vatican Council, accorded new freedom to the Yugoslav Roman Catholic Church, particularly to catechise and open seminaries. The agreement also eased tensions, which had prevented the naming of new bishops in Yugoslavia since 1945. Holy See and Yugoslavia reconciled their relations and worked together on achieving peace in Vietnam. Tito's new socialism met opposition from traditional communists culminating in a conspiracy headed by Aleksandar Ranković. Allegedly, the charge on which he was removed from power and expelled from the LCY was that he bugged Tito's working and sleeping quarters as well as those of many other high government officials. For almost 20 years, Ranković was at the head of the State Security Administration (UDBA), as well as Federal Secretary of Internal Affairs. His position as a party whip and Tito's way of controlling and monitoring the government and, to a certain extent, the people bothered many, especially the younger generation of government officials who were working toward a more liberal Yugoslav society. In the same year, Tito declared that communists must henceforth chart Yugoslavia's course by the force of their arguments (implying an abandonment of Leninist orthodoxy and development of liberal socialism).

On 1 January 1967, Yugoslavia became the first communist country to open its borders to all foreign visitors and abolish visa requirements. In the same year Tito became active in promoting a peaceful resolution of the Arab–Israeli conflict. His plan called for Arabs to recognise the state of Israel in exchange for territories Israel newly occupied.

In 1968, Tito offered to fly to Prague on three hours' notice if Czechoslovak leader Alexander Dubček needed help in facing down the Soviets. In April 1969, Tito removed generals Ivan Gošnjak and Rade Hamović in the aftermath of the invasion of Czechoslovakia due to the unpreparedness of the Yugoslav army to respond to a similar invasion of Yugoslavia.

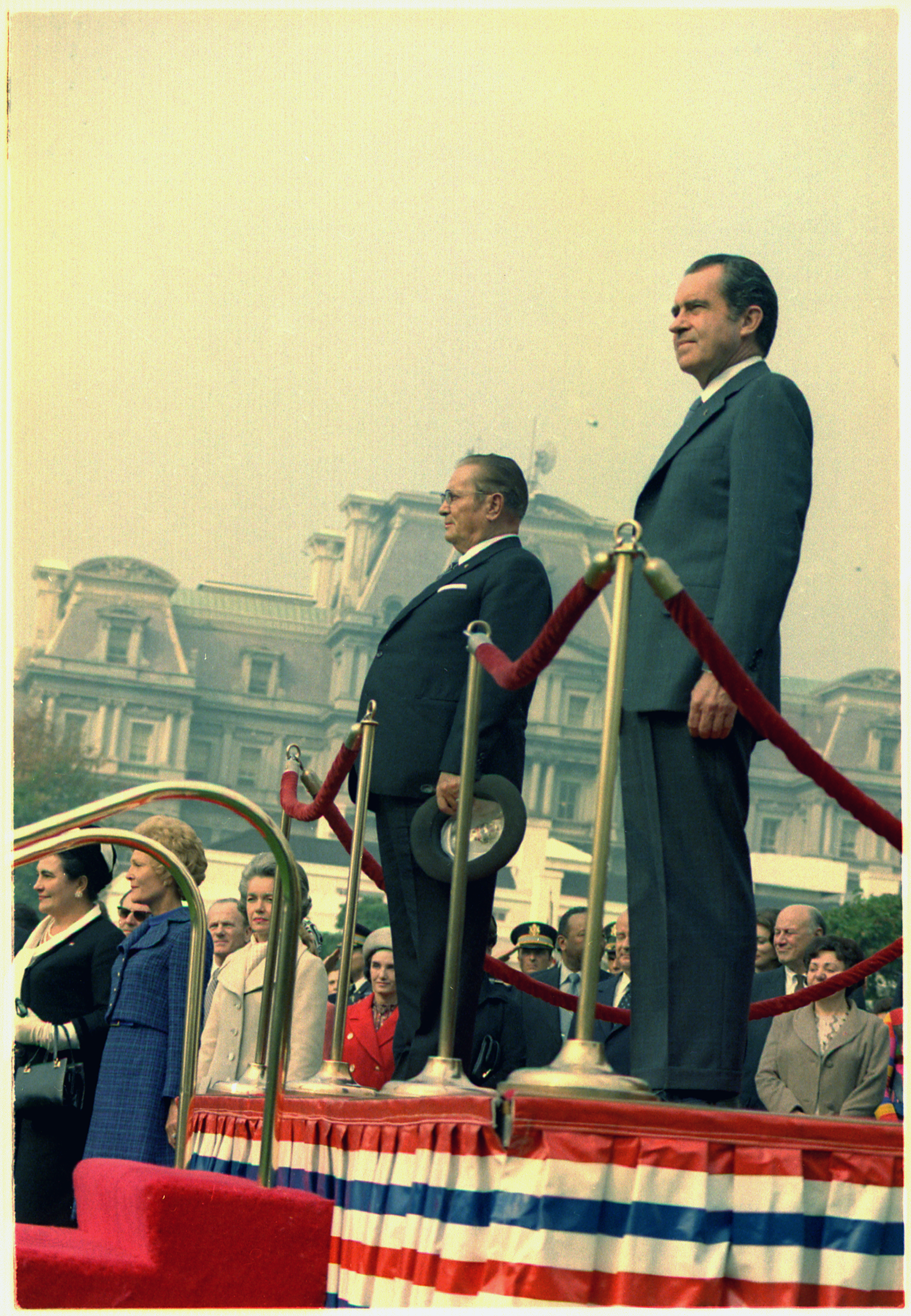
Tito with U.S. president Richard Nixon at the White House, 28 October 1971

In 1971, the Federal Assembly reelected Tito as president of Yugoslavia for the sixth time. In his speech before the Federal Assembly, he introduced 20 sweeping constitutional amendments to provide an updated framework on which the country would be based. The amendments provided for a collective presidency, a 22-member body consisting of elected representatives from six republics and two autonomous provinces. The body would have a single chairman of the presidency, and chairmanship would rotate among six republics. When the Federal Assembly failed to agree on legislation, the collective presidency would have the power to rule by decree. Amendments also provided for a stronger cabinet with considerable power to initiate and pursue legislation independently from the Communist Party. Džemal Bijedić was chosen as the Premier. The new amendments aimed to decentralise the country by granting greater autonomy to republics and provinces. The federal government would retain authority only over foreign affairs, defence, internal security, monetary affairs, free trade within Yugoslavia, and development loans to poorer regions. Control of education, healthcare, and housing would be exercised entirely by the governments of the republics and the autonomous provinces.

Tito's greatest strength, in the eyes of the western communists, had been in suppressing nationalist insurrections and maintaining unity throughout the country. It was Tito's call for brotherhood and unity, and related methods, that held together the people of Yugoslavia. This ability was put to a test several times during his reign, notably during the Croatian Spring (also referred as the Masovni pokret or Maspok for short, meaning "Mass Movement") when the government suppressed both public demonstrations and dissenting opinions within the Communist Party. Despite this suppression, much of Maspok's demands, including for decentralisation, were later realised with the new constitution, heavily backed by Tito himself against opposition from the Serbian branch of the party, who favoured centralisation. On 16 May 1974, the new Constitution was passed, and the 82-year-old Tito was named president for life. But the 1974 constitution caused issues for the Yugoslavian economy and distorted its market mechanism, leading to escalation of ethnic tensions.

Tito's visits to the U.S. avoided most of the Northeast due to large minorities of Yugoslav emigrants bitter about socialism in Yugoslavia. Security for the state visits was usually high to keep him away from protesters, who frequently burned the Yugoslav flag. During a visit to the United Nations in the late 1970s, emigrants shouted "Tito murderer" outside his New York hotel, which he protested to United States authorities.

== Final years and death ==
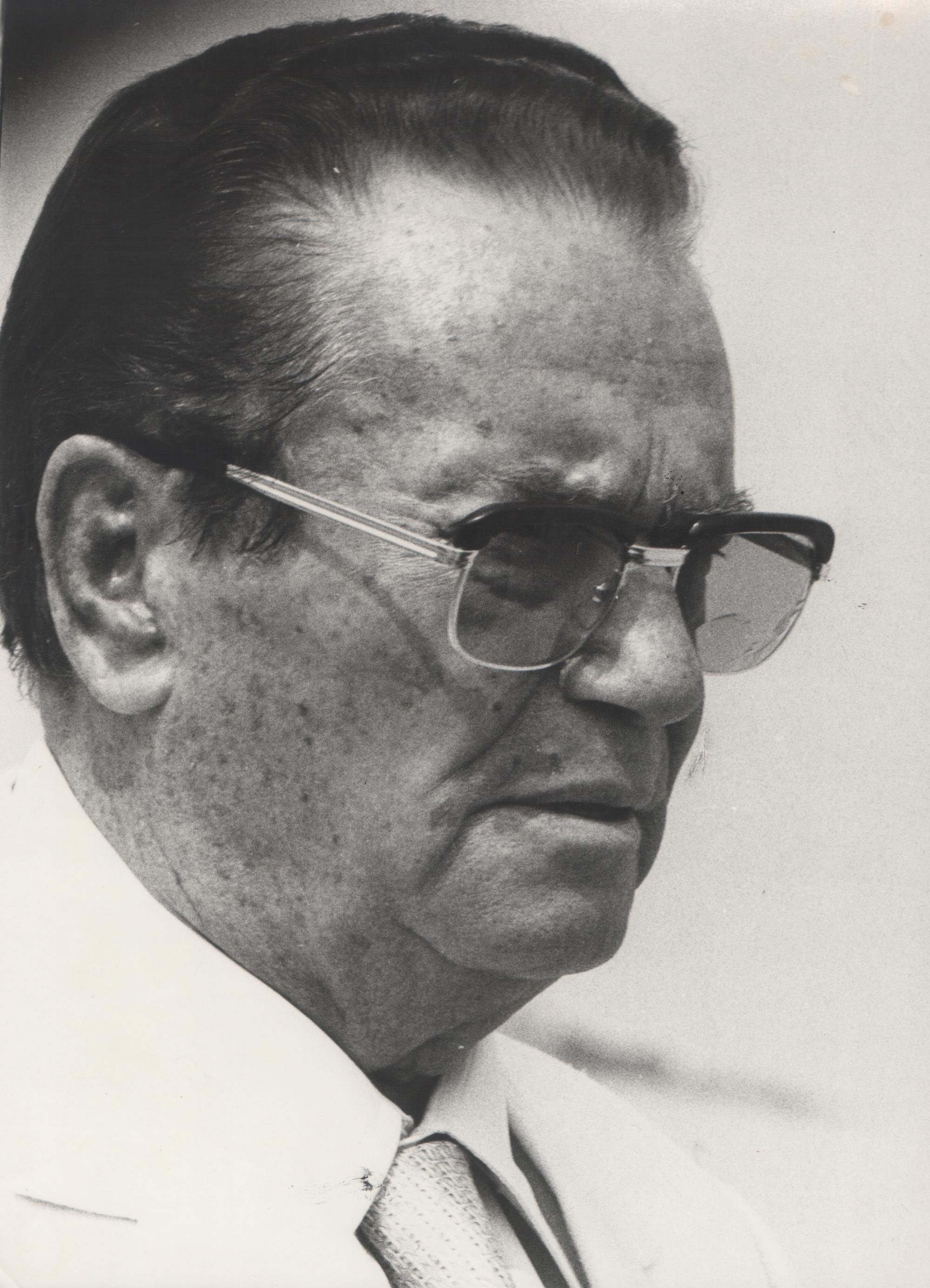
Tito in 1979

After the constitutional changes of 1974, Tito began reducing his role in the day-to-day running of the state, transferring much of it to the prime minister who was the head of government, but retained the final word on all major policy decisions as president and head of state and as the head of the League of Communists of Yugoslavia. The 40th anniversary of his communist party leadership was observed on the Youth Day of 1977 throughout Yugoslavia. He continued to travel abroad and receive foreign visitors, going to Beijing in 1977 and reconciling with the Chinese leadership that had once branded him a revisionist. In turn, Chairman Hua Guofeng visited Yugoslavia in 1979. In 1978, Tito travelled to the U.S. During the visit, strict security was imposed in Washington, D.C., owing to protests by anti-communist Croat, Serb and Albanian groups.

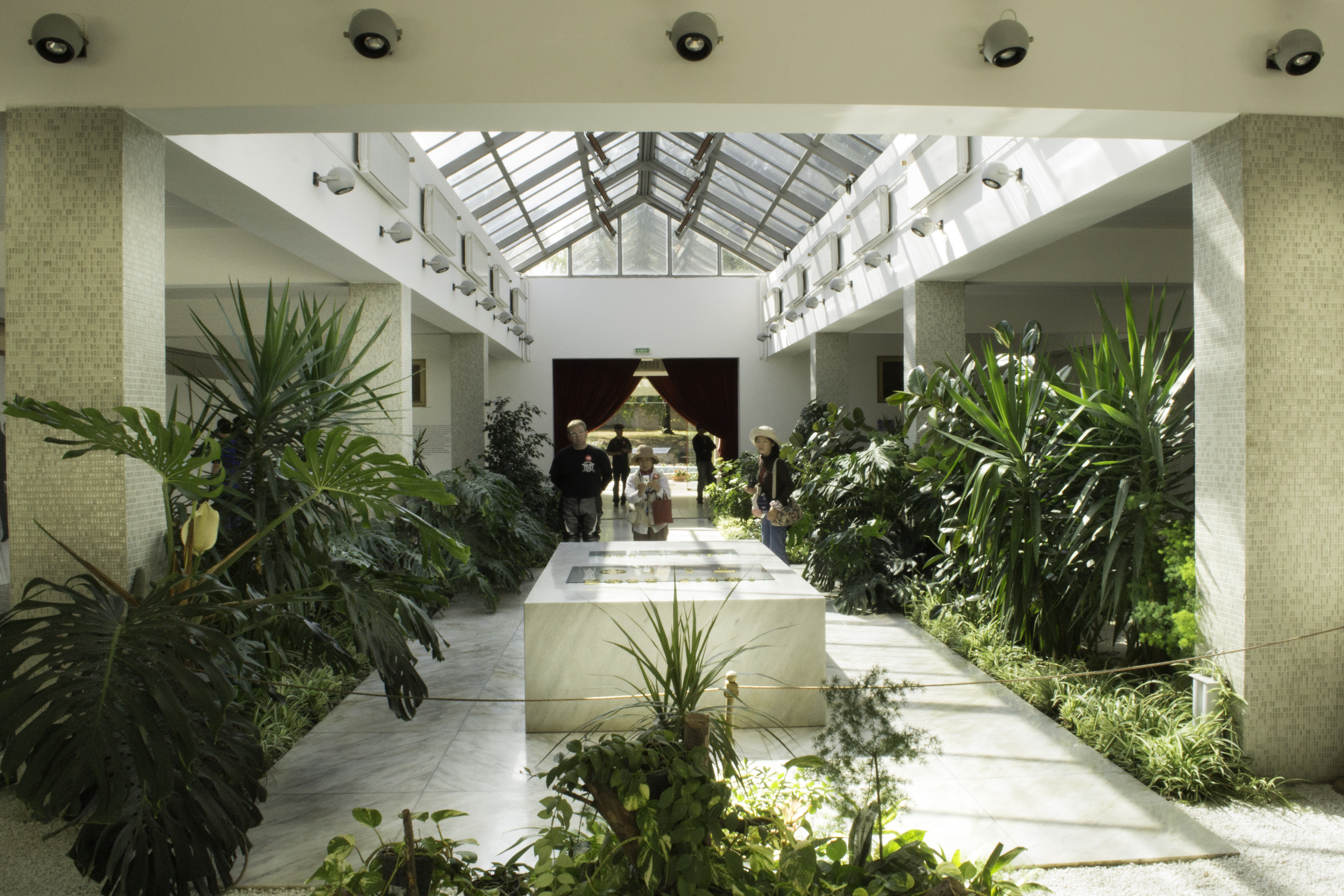
Tito's tomb at the House of Flowers, a mausoleum within the Museum of Yugoslavia in Belgrade, Serbia

Tito became increasingly ill over the course of 1979. During this time, Vila Srna was built for his use near Morović in the event of his recovery. On 7 January and again on 12 January 1980, Tito was admitted to the Medical Centre in Ljubljana, the capital city of the SR Slovenia, with circulation problems in his legs. Tito's stubbornness and refusal to allow doctors to follow through with the necessary amputation of his left leg played a part in his eventual death of gangrene-induced infection. His adjutant later testified that Tito threatened to take his own life if his leg was ever amputated and that he had to hide Tito's pistol in fear that he would follow through on his threat. After a private conversation with his sons Žarko and Mišo Broz, he finally agreed, and his left leg was amputated due to arterial blockages. The amputation proved to be too late, and Tito died at the Medical Centre of Ljubljana on 4 May 1980, three days short of his 88th birthday.

The state funeral of Josip Broz Tito drew many world statesmen. It attracted government leaders from 129 states. Based on the number of attending politicians and state delegations, at the time it was the largest state funeral in history; this concentration of dignitaries would be unmatched until the funeral of Pope John Paul II in 2005 and the memorial service of Nelson Mandela in 2013. Those who attended included four kings, 31 presidents, six princes, 22 prime ministers, and 47 ministers of foreign affairs. They came from both sides of the Cold War, from 128 countries out of 154 UN members at the time.

Reporting on his death, The New York Times wrote:

Tito sought to improve life. Unlike others who rose to power on the communist wave after WWII, Tito did not long demand that his people suffer for a distant vision of a better life. After an initial Soviet-influenced bleak period, Tito moved toward radical improvement of life in the country. Yugoslavia gradually became a bright spot amid the general grayness of Eastern Europe.

— The New York Times, 5 May 1980.

Tito was interred in the House of Flowers, a mausoleum in Belgrade which forms part of a memorial complex in the grounds of the Museum of Yugoslav History (formerly called "Museum 25 May" and "Museum of the Revolution"). The museum keeps the gifts Tito received during his presidency. The collection includes original prints of Los Caprichos by Francisco Goya, and many others.

== Evaluation ==
Dominic McGoldrick writes that as the head of a "highly centralised and oppressive" regime, Tito wielded tremendous power in Yugoslavia, with his authoritarian rule administered through an elaborate bureaucracy that routinely suppressed human rights. The main victims of this repression during the first years were known and alleged Stalinists, such as Dragoslav Mihailović and Dragoljub Mićunović, but in later years, even some of the most prominent of Tito's collaborators were arrested. On 19 November 1956, Milovan Đilas, perhaps the closest of Tito's collaborators, widely regarded as his possible successor, was arrested because of his criticism of Tito's regime. Victor Sebestyen writes that Tito "was as brutal as" Stalin. The repression did not exclude intellectuals and writers, such as Venko Markovski, who was arrested and sent to jail in January 1956 for writing poems considered anti-Titoist.

Even if, after the reforms of 1961, Tito's presidency had become comparatively more liberal than other communist regimes, the Communist Party continued to alternate between liberalism and repression. Yugoslavia managed to remain independent from the Soviet Union, and its brand of socialism was in many ways the envy of Eastern Europe, but Tito's Yugoslavia remained a tightly controlled police state. According to David Matas, outside the Soviet Union, Yugoslavia had more political prisoners than all of the rest of Eastern Europe combined. Tito's secret police were modelled on the Soviet KGB. Its members were ever-present and often acted extrajudicially, with victims including middle-class intellectuals, liberals and democrats. Yugoslavia was a signatory to the International Covenant on Civil and Political Rights, but scant regard was paid to its provisions.

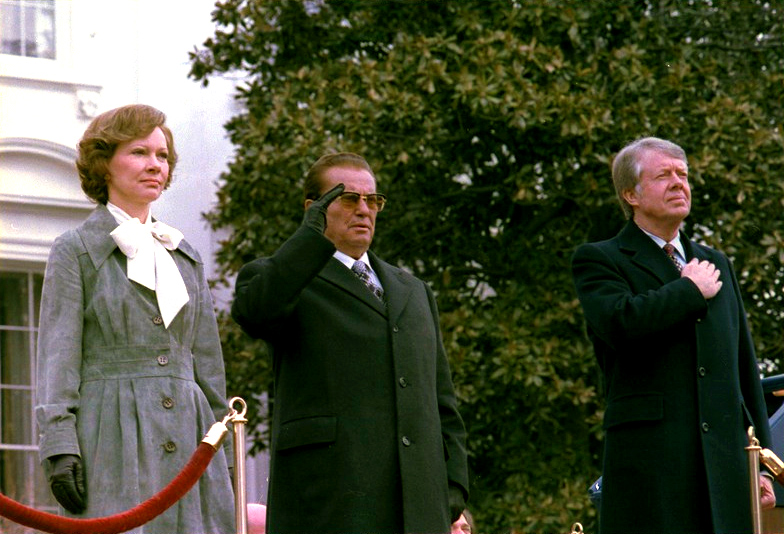
Tito with U.S. president Jimmy Carter in Washington, 7 March 1978

Tito's Yugoslavia was based on respect for nationality, though Tito ruthlessly purged any flowerings of nationalism that threatened the Yugoslav federation. But the contrast between the deference given to some ethnic groups and the severe repression of others was sharp. Yugoslav law guaranteed nationalities the right to use their language, but for ethnic Albanians, the assertion of ethnic identity was severely limited. Almost half of Yugoslavia's political prisoners were ethnic Albanians imprisoned for asserting their ethnic identity.

Yugoslavia's post-war development was impressive, but the country ran into economic snags around 1970 and experienced significant unemployment and inflation.

Declassified documents from the CIA state that in 1967, it was already clear that, although Tito's economic model had achieved growth of the gross national product around 7%, it also created frequently unwise industrial investment and a chronic deficit in the nation's balance of payment. In the 1970s, uncontrolled growth often created chronic inflation, which Tito and the Party could not fully stabilise or moderate. Yugoslavia also paid high interest on loans compared to the LIBOR rate, but Tito's presence eased investors' fears since he had proven willing and able to implement unpopular reforms. By 1979 with Tito's passing on the horizon, a global downturn in the economy, consistently increasing unemployment and growth slowing to 5.9% throughout the 1970s, it had become likely that "the rapid economic growth to which the Yugoslavs [had] become accustomed" would aggressively decline.

With the passing of the 1974 Yugoslav Constitution, Tito initiated what, according to A. Ross Johnson of the United States Department of State, "constituted the first effort in postwar Yugoslavia (and the first attempt in any Communist system) to establish depersonalised and institutionalised 'rules of the game' in Party decision-making bodies intended to apply to the period of succession". This system created a state and party presidency that was governed collectively, each limited to one year term of office. But this system might have contributed to the collapse of Yugoslavia, according to professor Robert M. Hayden: "While perhaps no federal structure could have contained the political pressures of Yugoslavia in 1989/91, the flaws of the 1974 constitution served to ensure that they became unmanageable, thus making civil war virtually inevitable. Responsibility for the war must thus be shared, between the Slovenes, whose actions destroyed the federal structure, Slobodan Milošević, whose aggressive politics goaded the Slovenes into doing so, and the drafters of the constitution, who made the chimaera of a "confederation" seem a reasonable constitutional structure."

== Legacy ==
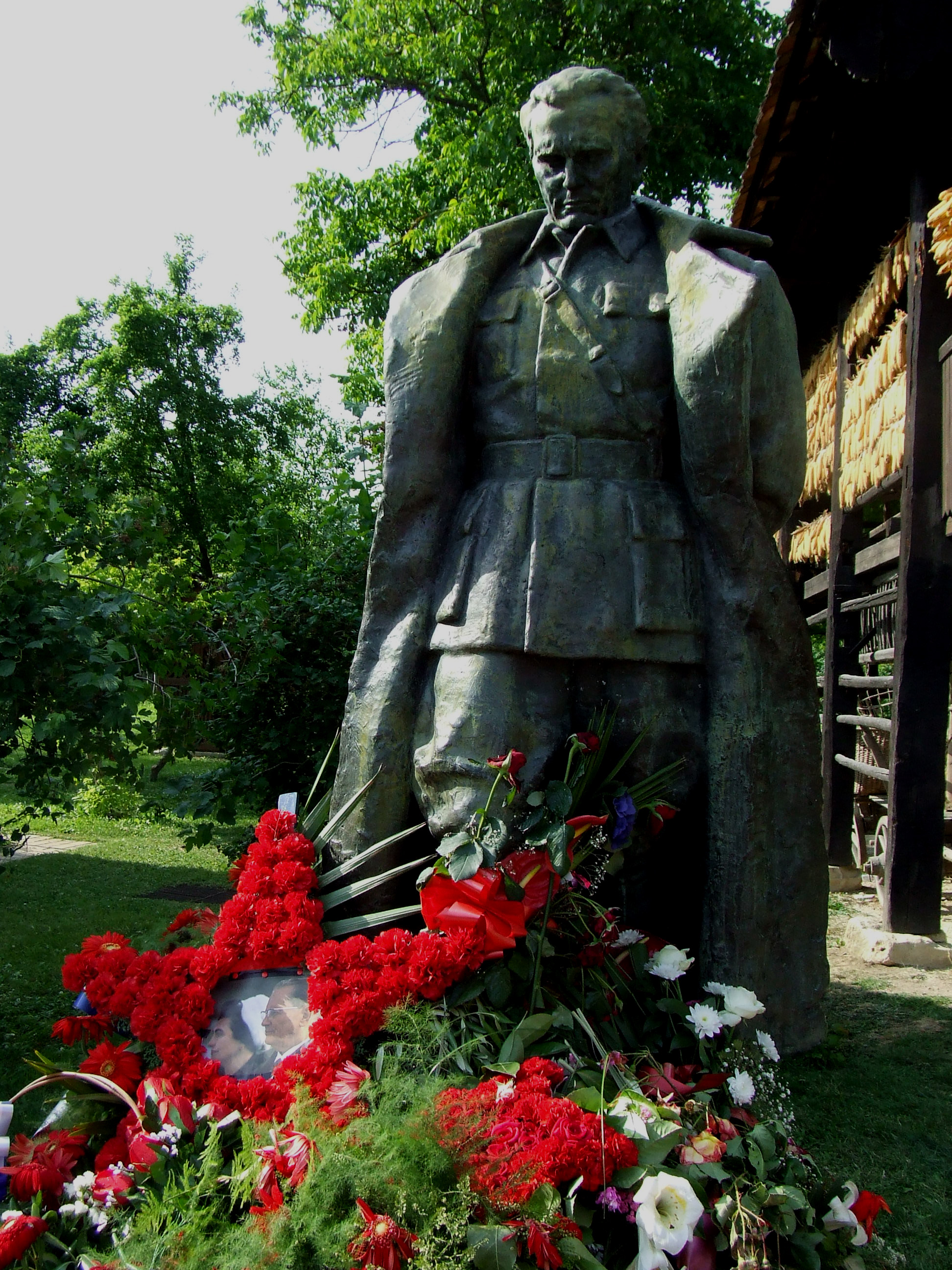
Statue of Tito in the village of his birth, Kumrovec, 2007

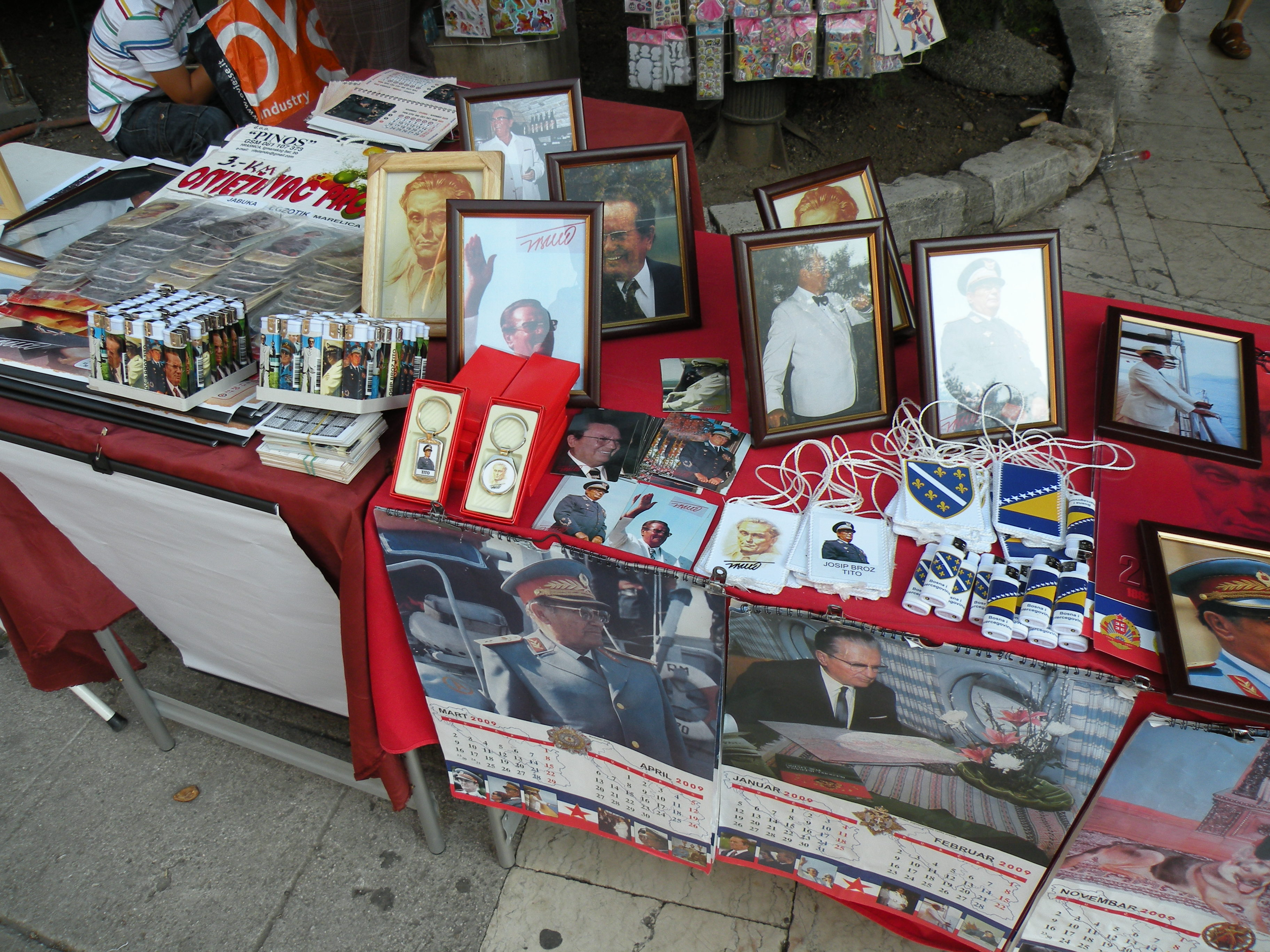
Tito memorabilia in a market in Sarajevo, Bosnia and Herzegovina, 2009

Tito is credited with transforming Yugoslavia from a poor nation to a middle-income one that saw vast improvements in women's rights, health, education, urbanisation, industrialisation, and many other areas of human and economic development. Evaluations, however, vary by region. In Slovenia, a poll by Mladina from 2010 found 75% of respondents considering him a "positive personality", with only 17% viewing him as a negative one; positive ratings were dominant across all generations (albeit lower among the youth), and the poll also had an unexpected finding that positive ratings reached about half (47%) even among supporters of the right-wing Slovenian Democratic Party, which is headed by Prime Minister Janez Janša, a strong critic of both Tito and the former socialist state. In Montenegro, when respondents were asked in 2021 to pick a historical figure who was most important for Montenegrin history, Tito came only in fourth place (chosen by 10.6%), but when asked to rate figures related to World War II, he came in first place with an average positive rating of 3.99 out of 5.00, overwhelmingly ahead of Chetnik leader Draža Mihailović, who averaged 2.75 (finishing second from the bottom on the list).

In his native Croatia, however, he is a more polarising figure; although ranked first in a 2003 poll to identify the "Greatest Croatian" by national weekly news magazine Nacional, he was only chosen by 26.4% of the respondents. In a 2019 Ipsos poll for Dnevnik Nove TV, when asked to choose between Tito and former president Franjo Tuđman, the first post-communist president and symbol of the nationalist camp, 51% chose Tuđman and only 35% Tito. Likewise in Serbia, his evaluation is divisive; a 2026 poll by political magazine NSPM found only 33.1% of respondents identifying Tito as "mostly positive", versus 47.0% viewing him as "mostly negative" and 19.9% withholding any evaluation, a slightly worse result than nationalist strongman Slobodan Milošević, who was 35.9% positive and 39.7% negative. This result for Tito matches the 32% who chose him as Serbia's greatest leader in 2016.

During his life and especially in the first year after his death, several places were named after Tito; several of these have since returned to their original names. For example, Podgorica, formerly Titograd (though Podgorica's international airport is still identified by the code TGD), and Užice, formerly known as Titovo Užice, which reverted to its original name in 1992. Streets in Belgrade, the capital, have all reverted to their original pre-World War II and pre-communist names as well. In 2004, Antun Augustinčić's statue of Broz in his birthplace of Kumrovec was decapitated in an explosion. It was subsequently repaired. Twice in 2008, protests took place in what was then Zagreb's Marshal Tito Square (since 2017 the Republic of Croatia Square), organised by a group called Circle for the Square (Krug za Trg), with an aim to force the city government to rename it to its previous name, while a counter-protest by Citizens' Initiative Against Ustašism (Građanska inicijativa protiv ustaštva) accused the "Circle for the Square" of historical revisionism and neo-fascism. Croatian president Stjepan Mesić criticised the demonstration to change the name.

In the Croatian coastal city of Opatija the main street (also its longest street) still bears the name of Marshal Tito. Rijeka, third largest city in Croatia, also refuses to change the name of one of the squares in the city centre named after Tito. There are streets named after Tito in numerous towns in Serbia, mostly in the country's north (Vojvodina). One of the main streets in downtown Sarajevo is called Marshal Tito Street, and Tito's statue in a park in front of the university campus (ex. JNA barrack "Maršal Tito") in Marijin Dvor is a place where Bosnians and Sarajevans still today commemorate and pay tribute to Tito. The largest Tito monument in the world, about 10 m (33 ft) high, is in Tito Square (Slovene: Titov trg), the central square in Velenje, Slovenia. One of the main bridges in Slovenia's second largest city of Maribor is Tito Bridge (Slovene: Titov most). The central square in Koper, the largest Slovenian port city, is named Tito Square. The main-belt asteroid 1550 Tito, discovered by Serbian astronomer Milorad B. Protić at Belgrade Observatory in 1937, was named in his honour.

The Croat historian Marijana Belaj wrote that for some people in Croatia and other parts of the former Yugoslavia, Tito is remembered as a sort of secular saint, mentioning how some Croats keep portraits of Catholic saints together with a portrait of Tito on their walls as a way to bring hope. The practice of writing letters to Tito has continued well after his death with several websites in former Yugoslavia devoted entirely as forums for people to send him posthumous letters, in which they often write about personal problems. Every year on 25 May, several thousand people from the former Yugoslavia gather in Tito's hometown of Kumrovec and his resting place, House of Flowers, to pay tribute to his memory and celebrate the former country's Youth Day, which in the Yugoslav era was one of the biggest annual celebrations and was marked by the Relay of Youth with a birthday pledge to Tito. Belaj wrote that much of the Tito cult's posthumous appeal centres around Tito's everyman persona and his image as a "friend" to ordinary people, in contrast to the way in which Stalin was depicted in his cult of personality as a cold, aloof, godlike figure whose extraordinary qualities set him apart from ordinary people. Most of those who come to Kumrovec on 25 May to kiss Tito's statue are women. Belaji wrote that the Tito cult's appeal today owes less to communism, observing that most people who come to Kumrovec do not believe in communism, than to nostalgia for Tito's Yugoslavia and affection for an "ordinary man" who became great. Tito was not a Croat nationalist, but the fact that Tito became the world's most famous Croat, serving as the leader of the Non-Aligned Movement and being seen as an important world leader, inspires pride in certain quarters of Croatia.

Every year a "Brotherhood and Unity" relay race is organised in Montenegro, North Macedonia, and Serbia that ends on 25 May at the "House of Flowers", Tito's final resting place. At the same time, runners in Slovenia, Croatia, and Bosnia and Herzegovina set off for Kumrovec. The relay is a leftover from the Relay of Youth from Yugoslav times, when young people made a similar yearly trek on foot through Yugoslavia that ended in Belgrade with a massive celebration.

Tito and Me (Serbo-Croatian: Тито и ја, Tito i ja), a Yugoslav comedy film by Serbian director Goran Marković, was released in 1992.

In the years following Yugoslavia's dissolution, historians started highlighting that human rights were suppressed in Yugoslavia under Tito, particularly in the first decade before the Tito–Stalin split. On 4 October 2011, the Slovenian Constitutional Court found a 2009 naming of a street in Ljubljana after Tito to be unconstitutional. While several public areas in Slovenia (named during the Yugoslav period) already bear Tito's name, on the issue of renaming an additional street the court ruled that:

The name "Tito" does not only symbolise the liberation of the territory of present-day Slovenia from fascist occupation in World War II, as claimed by the other party in the case but also grave violations of human rights and basic freedoms, especially in the decade following World War II.

But the court made clear that the purpose of the review was "not a verdict on Tito as a figure or on his concrete actions, as well as not a historical weighing of facts and circumstances". Slovenia has several streets and squares named after Tito, notably Tito Square in Velenje, incorporating a 10-meter statue.

Some scholars have named Tito as responsible for the systematic eradication of the ethnic German (Danube Swabian) population in Vojvodina by expulsions and mass executions following the collapse of the German occupation of Yugoslavia at the end of World War II, in contrast to his inclusive attitude towards other Yugoslav nationalities.

== Family and personal life ==
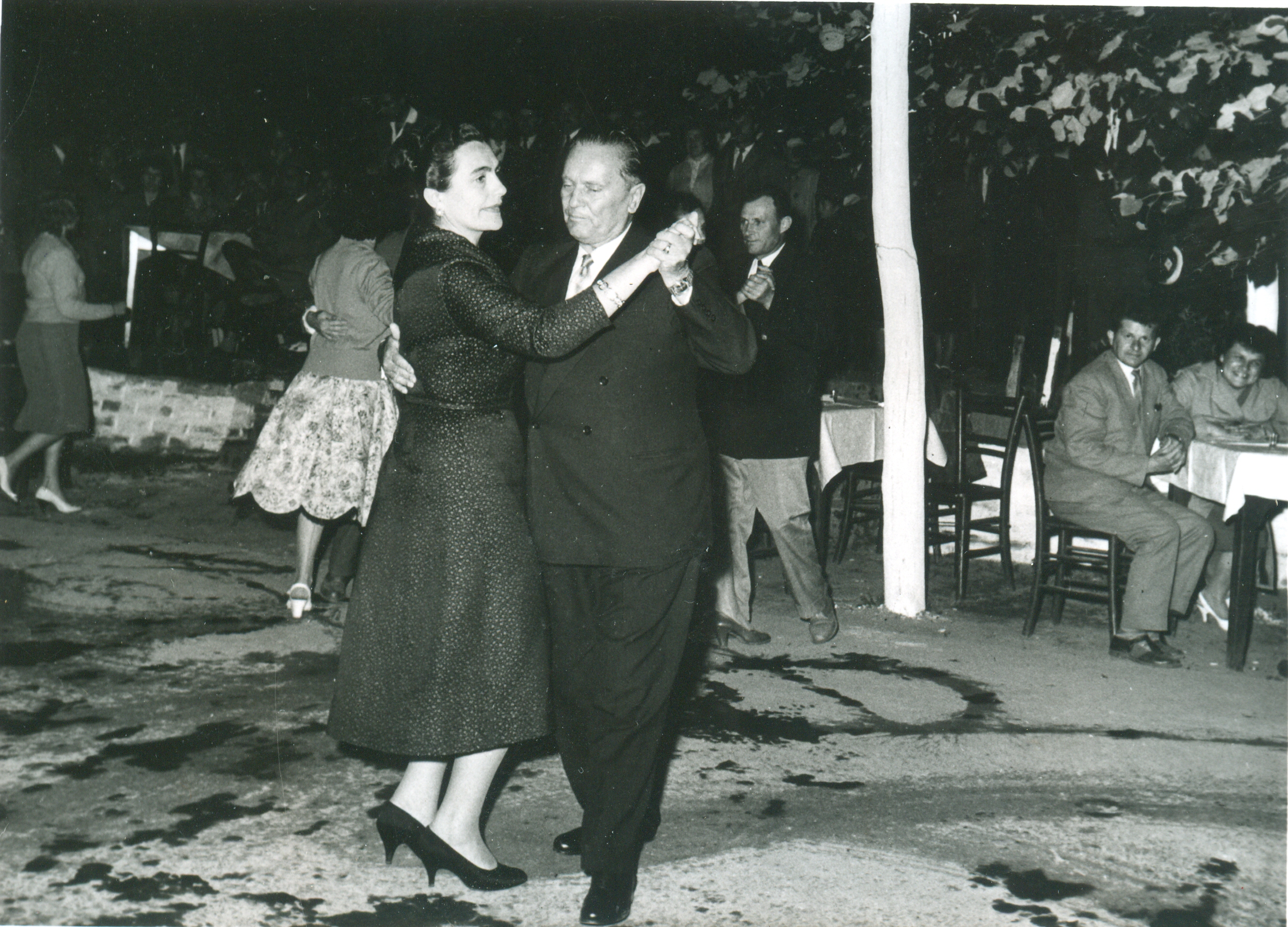
Jovanka Broz and Tito in Negotin, 1959

Tito's charisma was such that John Gunther was warned several times in Belgrade "Look out—don't be taken in!" Even those who opposed Tito's politics fondly recalled their Partisan days together. Women were especially amenable to his charm; he was married several times and had numerous affairs. In 1918 he was brought to Omsk, Russia, as a prisoner of war. There he met Pelagija Belousova, who was then 14; he married her a year later, and she moved with him to Yugoslavia. They had five children, but only their son Žarko Leon Broz (born 4 February 1924) survived. When Tito was jailed in 1928, Belousova returned to Russia. After the divorce in 1936, she remarried.

In 1936, when Tito stayed at the Hotel Lux in Moscow, he met the Austrian Lucia Bauer. They married in October 1936, but the records of this marriage were later deliberately erased.

In 1940, he married Herta Haas. Tito left for Belgrade after the April War, leaving Haas pregnant. In May 1941, she gave birth to their son, Aleksandar "Mišo" Broz. Throughout his relationship with Haas, Tito maintained a promiscuous life and had a parallel relationship with Davorjanka Paunović, who, under the codename "Zdenka Horvat", served as a courier in the resistance and became his personal secretary. Haas and Tito suddenly parted company in 1943 in Jajce during the second meeting of AVNOJ after she reportedly walked in on him and Davorjanka. The last time Haas saw Broz was in 1946. Davorjanka died of tuberculosis in 1946, and Tito insisted that she be buried in the backyard of the Beli Dvor, his Belgrade residence. Another secretary close to Tito was Olga Ninčić, daughter of Tito's opponent Momčilo Ninčić.

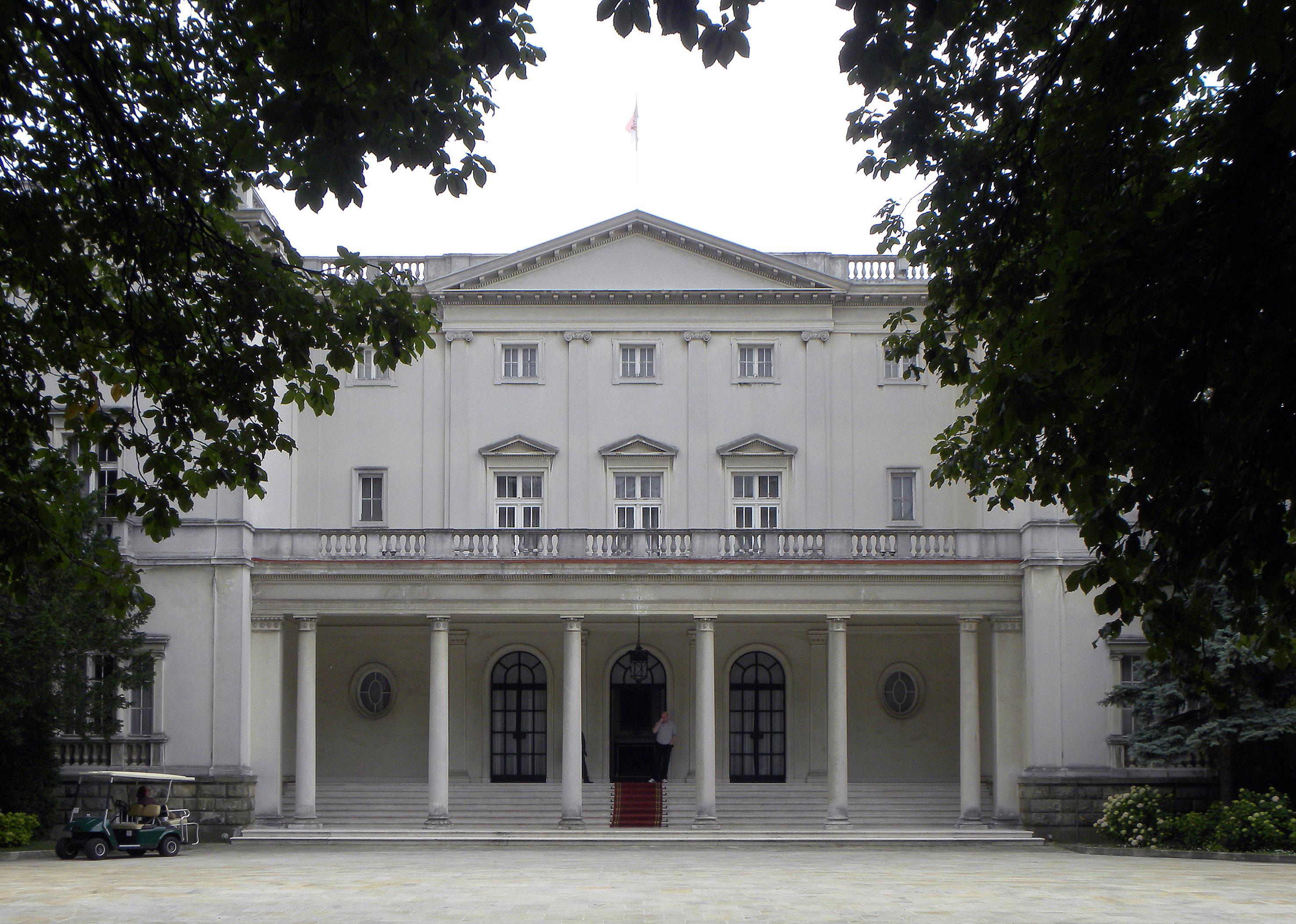
Beli Dvor in Belgrade, one of Tito's residences

Tito's best-known wife was Jovanka Broz. He was just shy of his 60th birthday and she was 27 when they married in April 1952, with state security chief Aleksandar Ranković as the best man. Their marriage came about somewhat unexpectedly since Tito actually rejected her some years earlier when his confidante Ivan Stevo Krajačić originally presented her to him. At that time, she was in her early 20s, and Tito objected to her upbeat personality. Not one to be easily discouraged, Jovanka continued working at Beli Dvor, where she managed the staff and eventually got another chance. Their relationship was not happy. It had gone through many, often public, ups and downs, with episodes of infidelity and even allegations of preparation for a coup d'état by the latter pair. Certain unofficial reports suggest Tito and Jovanka formally divorced in the late 1970s, shortly before his death, but during Tito's funeral, she was present in an official capacity as his wife and later claimed inheritance rights. The couple had no children.

Tito's grandchildren include Saša Broz, a theatre director in Croatia; Svetlana Broz, a cardiologist and writer in Bosnia and Herzegovina; Josip Broz (better-known as Joška Broz), a politician in Serbia; Edvard Broz and Natali Klasevski, an artisan of Bosnia and Herzegovina.

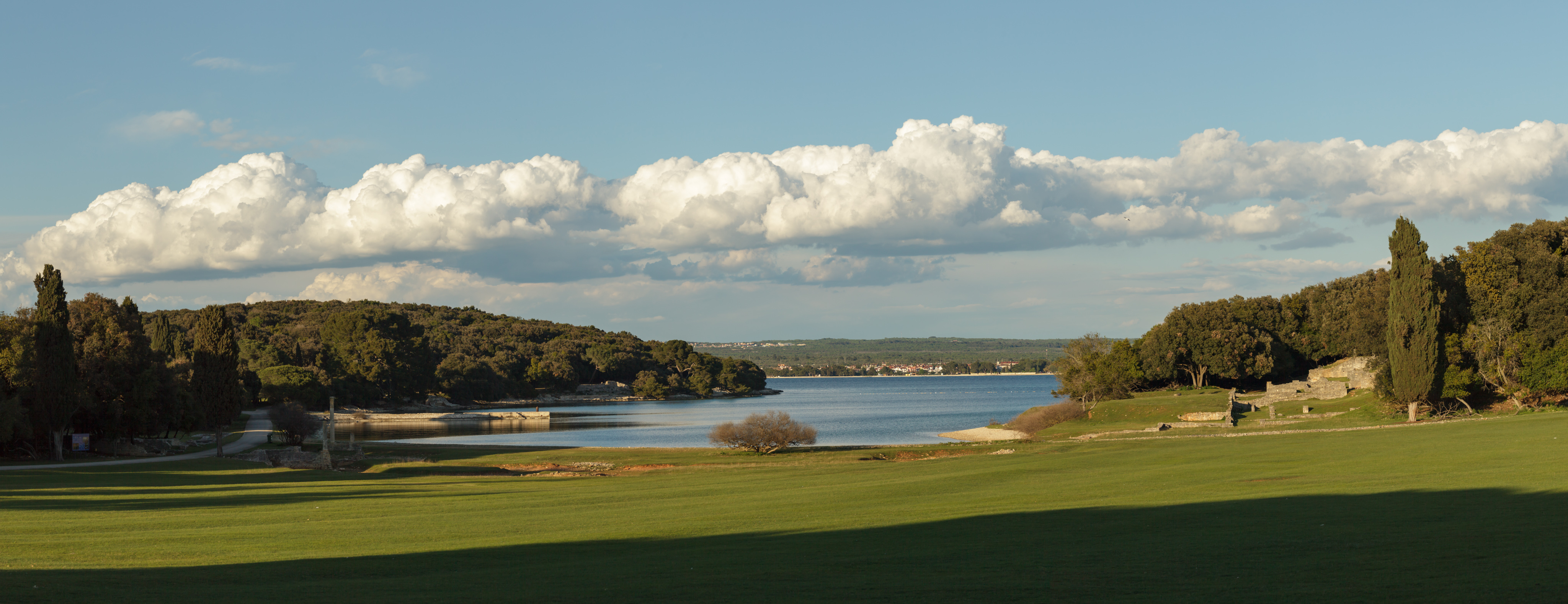
Brijuni Islands, location of the summer residence

As president, Tito had access to extensive (state-owned) property associated with the office and maintained a lavish lifestyle. In Belgrade, he resided in the official residence, the Beli Dvor, and maintained a separate private home at 10 Užička Street. The Brijuni Islands were the site of the State Summer Residence from 1949 on. The pavilion was designed by Jože Plečnik and included a zoo. Close to 100 foreign heads of state visited Tito at the island residence, along with film stars.

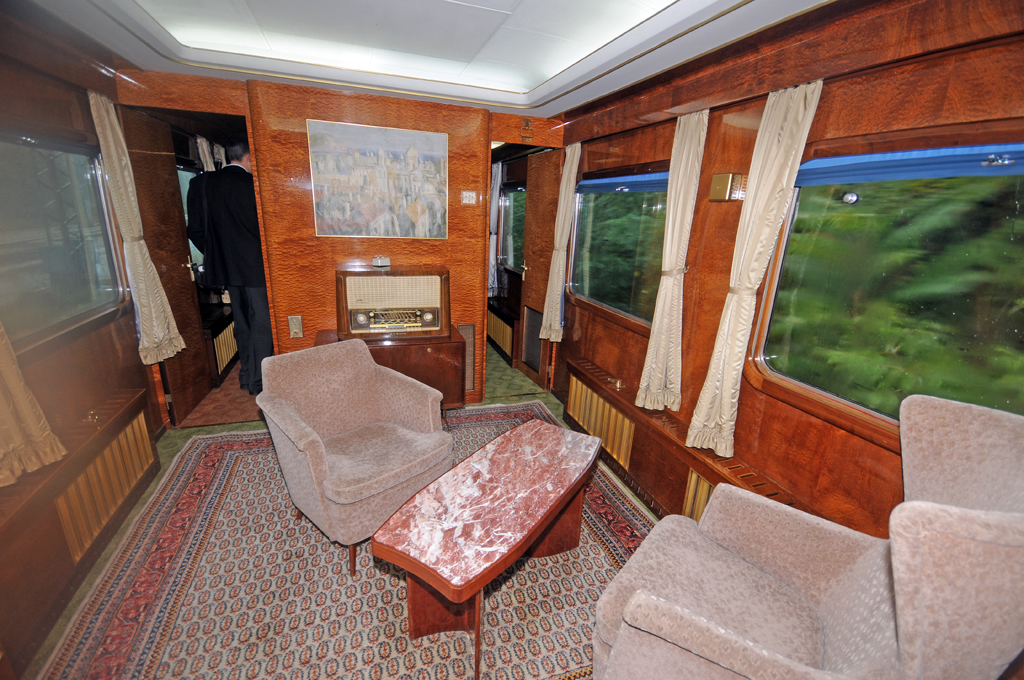
Lounge in the Blue Train

Another residence was maintained at Lake Bled, while the grounds at Karađorđevo were the site of "diplomatic hunts". By 1974 Tito had at his disposal 32 official residences, large and small, the yacht Galeb ("seagull"), a Boeing 727 as the presidential aeroplane, and the Blue Train. After his death, the presidential Boeing 727 was sold to Aviogenex, the Galeb remained docked in Montenegro, and the Blue Train was stored in a Serbian train shed for over two decades. While Tito was the person who held the office of president for by far the longest period, the associated property was not private, and much of it continues to be used by national governments, as public property or for use by high-ranking officials.

Tito claimed to speak Serbo-Croatian, German, Russian, and some English. His official biographer and then fellow Central Committee-member Vladimir Dedijer said in 1953 that he spoke "Serbo-Croatian ... Russian, Czech, Slovenian ... German (with a Viennese accent) ... understands and reads French and Italian ... [and] also speaks Kazakh". Gunther found that Tito's comprehension of English was excellent, but he was reluctant to speak it. At the 38th World Esperanto Congress held in Zagreb in 1953, Tito revealed his knowledge of Esperanto, which he had learned during his time in prison.

In his youth, Tito attended Catholic Sunday school and was later an altar boy. After an incident where he was slapped and shouted at by a priest when he had difficulty helping the priest remove his vestments, Tito did not cross another church's threshold. As an adult, he identified as an atheist.

Every federal unit had a town or city with historical significance to World War II renamed to include Tito's name. The largest of these was Titograd, now Podgorica, the capital city of Montenegro. With the exception of Titograd, the cities were renamed simply by the addition of the adjective Titov 'Tito's'. The names reverted to their original names after the Fall of Communism. The cities were:

Republic	City	Original name
Bosnia and Herzegovina	Titov Drvar (1981–1991)	Drvar
Croatia	Titova Korenica (1945–1991)	Korenica
Macedonia	Titov Veles (1946–1996)	Veles
Montenegro	Titograd (1948–1992) (Note: the capital of Montenegro.)	Podgorica
Serbia Kosovo Vojvodina	Titovo Užice (1947–1992) Titova Mitrovica (1981–1991) Titov Vrbas (1983–1992)	Užice Mitrovica Vrbas
Slovenia	Titovo Velenje (1981–1990)	Velenje

=== Language and identity dispute ===
During Tito's life and afterward, theories have been put forward suggesting the existence of several people who were actually Tito, none with any serious evidence to support them. Serbian journalist Vladan Dinić argued in Tito Is Not Tito that three separate people had identified as Tito. Tito's personal physician, Aleksandar Matunović, wrote a book about Tito in which he questioned his true origins, noting that Tito's habits and lifestyle could mean only that he was from an aristocratic family.

In 2013, media coverage was given to a declassified NSA study in Cryptologic Spectrum that concluded Tito had not spoken Serbo-Croatian like a native speaker. The report noted that his speech had features of other Slavic languages (Russian and Polish). The hypothesis that "a non-Yugoslav, perhaps a Russian or a Pole" assumed Tito's identity was included with a note that this had happened during or before the Second World War. The report notes Draža Mihailović's impressions of Tito's Russian origins after he had personally spoken with Tito.

However, the NSA's report was disputed by Croatian experts. The report failed to recognise that Tito was a native speaker of the very distinctive local Kajkavian dialect of Zagorje. His strong accent, present only in Croatian dialects, which Tito was able to pronounce perfectly, is the strongest evidence for his Zagorje origins.

=== Origin of the name "Tito" ===
As the Communist Party was outlawed in Yugoslavia starting on 30 December 1920, Josip Broz took on many assumed names during his activity within the Party, including "Rudi", "Walter", and "Tito". Broz himself explains:

It was a rule in the Party in those times not to use one's real name, in order to reduce the chances of exposure. For instance, if someone working with me was arrested, and flogged into revealing my real name, the police would easily trace me. But the police never knew the real person hiding behind an assumed name, such as I had in the Party. Naturally, even the assumed names often had to be changed. Even before going to prison, I had taken the name of Gligorijević, and of Zagorac, meaning the 'man from Zagorje'. I even signed a few newspaper articles with the second. Now I had to take a new name. I adopted first the name of Rudi, but another comrade had the same name and so I was obliged to change it, adopting the name Tito. I hardly ever used Tito at first; I assumed it exclusively in 1938, when I began to sign articles with it. Why did I take this name 'Tito' and has it special significance? I took it as I would have any other, because it occurred to me at the moment. Apart from that, this name is quite frequent in my native district. The best-known Zagorje writer of the late eighteenth century was called Tito Brezovački; his witty comedies are still given in the Croatian theatre after more than a hundred years. The father of Ksaver Šandor Gjalski, one of the greatest Croatian writers, was also called Tito.

== Awards and decorations ==
Josip Broz Tito received 119 awards and decorations from 60 countries. 21 decorations were from Yugoslavia itself, including the Order of the National Hero on three occasions. Of the 98 international awards and decorations, three were received on two occasions (Order of the White Lion, Polonia Restituta, and Karl Marx). The most notable awards included the French Legion of Honour and National Order of Merit, the British Order of the Bath, the Soviet Order of Victory, the Japanese Order of the Chrysanthemum, the West German Federal Cross of Merit, and the Order of Merit of the Italian Republic.

The decorations were seldom displayed, however. After the Tito–Stalin split of 1948 and his inauguration as president in 1953, Tito rarely wore his uniform except when present in a military function, and then (with rare exception) only wore his Yugoslav ribbons for practical reasons. The awards were displayed in full number only at his funeral in 1980. Tito's reputation as one of the Allied leaders of World War II, along with his diplomatic position as the founder of the Non-Aligned Movement, was primarily the cause of the favourable international recognition.

=== Domestic awards ===
1st row						
1st row	Order of the People's Hero ^{[α]}^{[β]}					
2nd row						
2nd row	Order of the Yugoslav Great Star	Order of Freedom	Order of the Hero of Socialist Labour	Order of National Liberation	Order of the War Banner	Order of the Yugoslav Flag with Sash
3rd row						
3rd row	Order of the Partisan Star with Golden Wreath	Order of the Republic with Golden Wreath	Order of Merits for the People with Golden Star	Order of Brotherhood and Unity with Golden Wreath	Order of the People's Army with Laurel Wreath	Order of Military Merits with Great Star
4th row						
4th row	Order of Bravery	Commemorative Medal of the Partisans of 1941	10 Years of the Yugoslav People's Army Medal	20 Years of the Yugoslav People's Army Medal	30 Years of the Yugoslav People's Army Medal	30 Years of the Victory over Fascism Medal
Note 1: Awarded 3 times. Note 2: All state decorations of the former Yugoslavia are now defunct.

== Bibliography ==
- Auty, Phyllis (1970). Tito: A Biography. New York City: McGraw-Hill. OCLC 100536.
- Banac, Ivo (1988). With Stalin against Tito: Cominformist splits in Yugoslav Communism. Ithaca, New York: Cornell University Press. ISBN 978-0-8014-2186-0.
- Barnett, Neil (2006). Tito. London: Haus Publishing. ISBN 978-1913368425.
- Belaj, Marijana (2008). "'I'm not religious, but Tito is a God': Tito, Kumrovec, and the New Pilgrims". In Margry, Peter Jan (ed.). Shrines and Pilgrimage in the Modern World: New Itineraries into the Sacred. Amsterdam: Amsterdam University Press. pp. 71–94. ISBN 978-90-485-0224-0.
- Borneman, John (2004). Death of the Father: An Anthropology of End in Political Authority. Berghahn Books. ISBN 978-1-57181-111-0.
- Cook, Bernard A. (2001). Europe Since 1945: An Encyclopedia, Volume 2 K-Z. New York City: Garland Publishing Inc. ISBN 9780815340584.
- Corbel, Josef (1951). Tito's Communism. Denver, Colorado: The University of Denver Press.
- Dedijer, Vladimir (1980) [1952]. Tito. New York: Simon and Schuster. ISBN 978-0-405-04565-3.
- Dedijer, Vladimir (1953). Tito Speaks: His Self Portrait and Struggle with Stalin. London, England: Weidenfeld and Nicolson.
- Dimić, Ljubodrag (2012). "Josip Broz Tito, Yugoslav policy and the formation of the concept of European security, 1968–1975". From Helsinki to Belgrade: the First CSCE follow-up meeting and the crisis of détente. Bonn: Bonn University Press. pp. 59–81. ISBN 978-3899719383.
- Forsythe, David P., ed. (2009). Encyclopedia of Human Rights. Vol. 5. Oxford, England: Oxford University Press. ISBN 978-0-19-533402-9.
- Frankel, Benjamin (1992). The Cold War, 1945–1991: Leaders and Other Important Figures in the Soviet Union, Eastern Europe, China, and the Third World. Vol. 2. London, England: Gale Research. ISBN 978-0-8103-8928-1.
- Finlan, Alastair (2004). The Collapse of Yugoslavia 1991–1999. New York: Osprey Publishing. ISBN 978-1-4728-1027-4.
- Gilbert, Martin (2004). The First World War: A Complete History. New York: Henry Holt and Company. ISBN 978-0-8050-7617-2.
- Jeffreys-Jones, Rhodri (2013). In Spies We Trust: The Story of Western Intelligence. OUP Oxford. ISBN 978-0-19-958097-2.
- Jelavich, Barbara (1983). History of the Balkans: Volume 2. Cambridge University Press. ISBN 978-0521274593.
- Kocon, Ivan; Jeličić, Matej; Škunca, Ivan (1988). Stvaranje Titove Jugoslavije [The Creation of Tito's Yugoslavia] (in Serbo-Croatian). Opatija, Yugoslavia: Otokar Keršovani. ISBN 978-86-385-0091-8.
- Laqueur, Walter (1976). Guerrilla Warfare: A Historical & Critical Study. New Brunswick, New Jersey: Transaction Publishers. ISBN 978-1-4128-2488-0.
- Lee, Khoon Choy (1993). Diplomacy of a Tiny State. Singapore: World Scientific. ISBN 978-981-02-1219-3.
- Lees, Lorraine M. (2006). Keeping Tito Afloat: The United States, Yugoslavia, and the Cold War. Pennsylvania State University Press. ISBN 978-0-253-34656-8.
- Maclean, Fitzroy (1957). The Heretic: the life and times of Josip Broz-Tito. Harper & Bro. LCCN 57-6130. OCLC 346176.
- Matas, David (1994). No More: The Battle Against Human Rights Violations. Dundurn. ISBN 978-1-55002-221-6.
- McGoldrick, Dominic (2000). "Accommodating National Identity in National Law and International Law". In Stephen Tierney (ed.). Accommodating National Identity: New Approaches in International and Domestic Law. Martinus Nijhoff Publishers. ISBN 978-90-411-1400-6.
- Minahan, James (1998). Miniature Empires: A Historical Dictionary of the Newly Independent States. Westport, Connecticut: Greenwood Publishing Group. ISBN 978-0-313-30610-5.
- Mikola, Milko (2008). "Communist Concentration and Labour Camps in Slovenia". In Jambrek, Peter (ed.). Crimes Committed by Totalitarian Regimes (PDF). Ljubljana: Slovenian Presidency of the Council of the European Union. ISBN 978-961-238-977-2. Archived from the original (PDF) on 13 July 2019.
- Nikolić, Kosta (2003). Drašković, Dragan; Ristić, Radomir (eds.). Kraljevo in October 1941. Kraljevo: National Museum Kraljevo, Historical Archive Kraljevo.
- Pavlowitch, Stevan K. (1988). The improbable survivor: Yugoslavia and its problems, 1918–1988. (online free to borrow)
- Pavlowitch, Stevan K. (1992). Tito--Yugoslavia's great dictator : a reassessment. (online free to borrow)
- Pavlowitch, Stevan K. (2008). Hitler's New Disorder: The Second World War in Yugoslavia. Columbia University Press. ISBN 978-0231700504. (excerpt and text search)
- Petrović, Vladimir (2014). Josip Broz Tito's summit diplomacy in the international relations of socialist Yugoslavia 1944–1961 (PDF) (original scientific article). Belgrade: Institute of Contemporary History. pp. 577–592. Archived (PDF) from the original on 16 July 2020.
- Ramet, Sabrina Petra (2006). The Three Yugoslavias: State-Building and Legitimation, 1918–2005. Bloomington: Indiana University Press. ISBN 978-0-253-34656-8. Archived from the original on 23 December 2024.
- Ridley, Jasper (1994). Tito: A Biography. London: Constable and Company. ISBN 978-0-09-475610-6.
- Roberts, Walter R. (1987). Tito, Mihailović and the Allies: 1941–1945. New Brunswick, New Jersey: Duke University Press. ISBN 978-0-8223-0773-0.
- Stričević, Marko (2024). Tito u Rusiji: sibirska odiseja 1915.-1920. Biblioteka Ambrozija. Zagreb: V.B.Z. ISBN 978-953-52-0701-6.
- Swain, Geoffrey (2010). Tito: A Biography. London: I.B. Tauris. ISBN 978-1-84511-727-6.
- Sherwood, Timothy H. (2013). The Rhetorical Leadership of Fulton J. Sheen, Norman Vincent Peale, and Billy Graham in the Age of Extremes. Lexington Books. ISBN 978-0-7391-7431-9.
- Tomasevich, Jozo; Vucinich, Wayne S. (1969). Contemporary Yugoslavia: Twenty Years of Socialist Experiment. University of California Press.
- Tomasevich, Jozo (1975). War and Revolution in Yugoslavia, 1941–1945: The Chetniks. Stanford, California: Stanford University Press. ISBN 978-0-8047-0857-9.
- Tomasevich, Jozo (2001). War and Revolution in Yugoslavia, 1941–1945: Occupation and Collaboration. Stanford, California: Stanford University Press. ISBN 978-0-8047-3615-2. Archived from the original on 17 March 2025.
- Trbovich, Ana S. (2008). A Legal Geography of Yugoslavia's Disintegration. Oxford: Oxford University Press. ISBN 978-0-19-533343-5.
- Calic, Marie-Janine (2019). A History of Yugoslavia. West Lafayette, Indiana: Purdue University Press. ISBN 978-1-55753-838-3.
- Vinterhalter, Vilko (1972). In the Path of Tito... Tunbridge Wells, England: Abacus Press. ISBN 978-0-85626-011-7.
- Vucinich, Wayne S. (1969). "Interwar Yugoslavia". Contemporary Yugoslavia: Twenty Years of Socialist Experiment. Berkeley, California: University of California Press. OCLC 652337606.
- West, Richard (1995). Tito and the Rise and Fall of Yugoslavia. New York: Carroll & Graf. ISBN 978-0-7867-0191-9.

Journals and papers

- Dimić, Ljubodrag (2003). "Tito and Krushchev 1953–1956: Coming together, reconciliation, disappointment". Journal of Central and East European Studies. 5 (2): 423–456.
- Dimić, Ljubodrag (2016). "Yugoslavia and Security in Europe during the 1960s (Views, Attitudes, Initiatives)" (PDF). Токови историје (3): 9–42. Archived (PDF) from the original on 30 April 2019.
- Filipič, France [in Slovenian] (1979). "Prije četrdeset godina" [Forty Years Ago]. Časopis za suvremenu povijest (in Serbo-Croatian). 11 (2–3). Zagreb, Croatia: Croatian Institute of History. ISSN 1848-9079.
- Granville, Johanna (May 1998). "Hungary, 1956: The Yugoslav Connection". Europe-Asia Studies. 50 (3): 493–505. doi:10.1080/09668139808412549.
- Mahmutović, Vahidin (2013). "Politički osuđenici u KZ Zenica u periodu 1918–1941. godine" [Political prisoners in KZ Zenica during the period of 1918–1941]. Annals of the Faculty of Law of the University of Zenica (in Serbo-Croatian). 6 (12). University of Zenica: 267–277. ISSN 1986-5791. Archived from the original on 1 February 2023.
- McKee Irwin, Robert (Spring 2010). "Mexican Golden Age Cinema in Tito's Yugoslavia". The Global South. 4 (1): 151–166. doi:10.2979/gso.2010.4.1.151. JSTOR 10.2979/gso.2010.4.1.151. S2CID 145443397.
- Hayden, Robert M. (1992). "The Beginning of the End of Federal Yugoslavia: The Slovenian Amendment Crisis of 1989". The Carl Beck Papers in Russian and East European Studies (1001): 1–37. doi:10.5195/cbp.1992.108. Archived from the original on 2 June 2023.
- Johnson, A. Ross (1983). Political Leadership in Yugoslavia: Evolution of the League of Communists (PDF) (Report). United States Department of State. Archived (PDF) from the original on 2 June 2023.
- Perović, Jeronim (1983). "The Tito-Stalin Split: A Reassessment in Light of New Evidence" (PDF). Journal of Cold War Studies. 9 (2). MIT Press: 32–63. doi:10.1162/jcws.2007.9.2.32. JSTOR 26926016. S2CID 154278864. Archived (PDF) from the original on 5 June 2023.

Party political offices
Preceded by Milan Gorkić	President of the League of Communists of Yugoslavia; 1937–1980 (acting before October 1940)	Succeeded by Branko Mikulić
Political offices
Preceded by Ivan Šubašić as Prime Minister of the Kingdom of Yugoslavia	President of the Federal Executive Council¹; 1944–1963	Succeeded by Petar Stambolić
Preceded by Ivan Šubašić as Ministry of Foreign Affairs of the Kingdom of Yugoslavia in exile	Foreign Minister of Yugoslavia; 1945–1946 (acting)	Succeeded by Stanoje Simić
Preceded by Borisav Ristić as Minister of the Army, Navy and Air Force of the Yugoslav government-in-exile	Defence Minister of Yugoslavia; 1945–1953	Succeeded by Ivan Gošnjak
Preceded by Ivan Ribar as President of the Presidency of the People's Assembly	President of Yugoslavia; 1953–1980²	Succeeded by Lazar Koliševski as President of the Presidency of Yugoslavia
Military offices
New title	Marshal of Yugoslavia; 1943–1980	Title Abolished
Diplomatic posts
New office	Secretary-General of the Non-Aligned Movement; 1961–1964	Succeeded by Gamal Abdel Nasser
Notes and references
1. i.e. Prime Minister of Yugoslavia; 2. President for Life from 22 January 1974, died in office
