= Olympic Committee of Serbia =

Sports governing body in Serbia

- Country: Serbia
- Code: SRB
- Created: 1910; 116 years ago
- Recognized: 1912
- Continental Association: EOC
- Headquarters: Belgrade, Serbia
- President: Dejan Tomašević
- Secretary General: Đorđe Višacki
- Website: oks.org.rs

The Olympic Committee of Serbia (Serbian: Olimpijski komitet Srbije, Serbian Cyrillic: Олимпијски комитет Србије) is the National Olympic Committee representing Serbia. It organizes the country's participation at the Olympic Games and other multisport events.

The Committee consists of 47 sports federations, which elect an Executive Council composed of the president and seventeen members.

== History ==
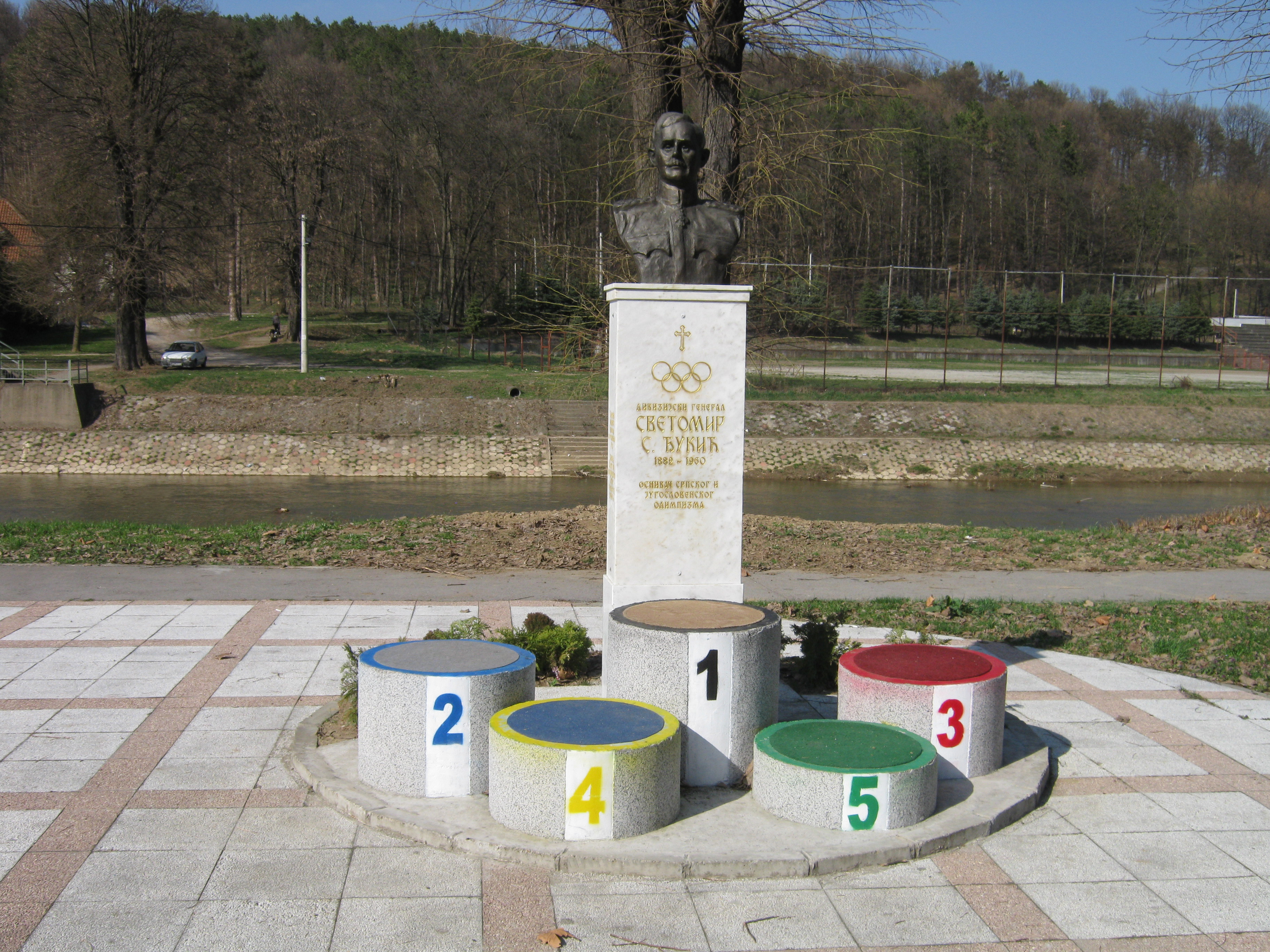
A statue of Svetomir Đukić, the founder of the Olympic Committee of Serbia, in Valjevo

The Serbian Olympic Club (Serbian: Srpski olimpijski klub, Serbian Cyrillic: Српски олимпијски клуб) was established on February 23, 1910. Major Svetomir Đukić is considered the founder of the Olympic movement in Serbia. In 1912, the Serbian Olympic Club changed its name to the Olympic Committee of Serbia and that year it was recognized by the International Olympic Committee (IOC). After the Creation of Yugoslavia, the Yugoslav Olympic Committee (Југословенски олимпијски комитет / Jugoslovenski olimpijski komitet) was created in Zagreb in 1919, before moving to Belgrade in 1927. It was recognized by the IOC in 1920.

After the country was renamed from the Federal Republic of Yugoslavia to Serbia and Montenegro in 2003, it changed its name to the Olympic Committee of Serbia and Montenegro (Олимпијски комитет Србије и Црне Горе / Olimpijski komitet Srbije i Crne Gore). In 2006, Serbia became an independent country following the Montenegrin independence referendum, and the Olympic Committee of Serbia reverted to its original name. Belgrade, the capital of Serbia and Yugoslavia, submitted two separate bids to host the 1992 Summer Olympics and the 1996 Summer Olympics.

== List of presidents ==
President	Term
Nikodije Stevanović	1910–1919
Franjo Bučar	1919–1927
Dušan Stefanović	1927–1931
Stefan Hadži	1931–1941
Stanko Bloudek	1948–1950
Dušan Korać	1950–1951
Gustav Vlahov	1951–1952
Boris Bakrač	1952–1960
Milijan Neoričić	1960–1964
Zoran Polič	1964–1973
Gojko Sekulovski	1973–1977
Đorđe Peklić	1977–1981
Slobodan Filipović	1981–1982
Azem Vllasi	1982–1983
Zdravko Mutin	1983–1986
Ivan Mećanović	1986–1989
Aleksandar Bakočević	1989–1996
Dragan Kićanović	1996–2005
Philip Zepter	2005
Ivan Ćurković	2005–2009
Vlade Divac	2009–2017
Božidar Maljković	2017–2025
Dejan Tomašević	2025–present

== IOC members ==
Member	Term
Svetomir Đukić	1912–1948
Franjo Bučar	1920–1947
Stanko Bloudek	1948–1959
Boris Bakrač	1960–1986
Slobodan Filipović	1987–1995
Borislav Stanković	1988–2005
Nenad Lalović	2015–present

== Executive committee ==
The 2017-2020 committee of the OCS is represented by:

- President: Božidar Maljković
- IOC member: Nenad Lalović
- Honorary IOC Member: Borislav Stanković
- President of Sports Commission of OCS: Ivan Miljković
- Members:
- 10 Members from the Olympic Sports Federations: Mirko Nišović (president of Canoe Federation), Željko Trajković (president of Wrestling Federation), Veselin Jevrosimović (president of Athletics Federation), Zoran Gajić (president of Volleyball Federation), Predrag Danilović (president of Basketball Federation), Snežana Žugić (president of Diving Association), Nenad Petković (president of Shooting Federation), Iva Popović (president of Synchronized Swimming Federation), Milorad Krivokapić (president of Water Polo Federation), Vladeta Radivojević (president of Ski Association)
- 3 Members who were chosen by the OCS: Žarko Zečević, Bogdan Obradović, Milica Mandić
- Member of Sports Association of Serbia: Aleksandar Šoštar

== Member federations ==
The Serbian National Federations are the organizations that coordinate all aspects of their individual sports. They are responsible for training, competition and development of their sports. There are currently 35 Olympic Summer and 7 Olympic Winter Sport Federations along with 5 other Sports Federations in Serbia.

=== Olympic Sport Federations ===
National Federation	Summer or Winter	Headquarters
Archery Association of Serbia	Summer	Belgrade
Athletics Federation of Serbia	Summer	Belgrade
Badminton Association of Serbia	Summer	Belgrade
Baseball Federation of Serbia	Summer	Belgrade
Basketball Federation of Serbia	Summer	Belgrade
Biathlon Union of Serbia	Winter	Belgrade
Serbian Bob & Skeleton Association	Winter	Belgrade
Serbian Boxing Federation	Summer	Belgrade
Serbian Canoe Federation	Summer	Belgrade
Sport Climbing Federation of Serbia	Summer	Belgrade
Clay Target Shooting Federation of Serbia	Summer	Belgrade
National Curling Association of Serbia	Winter	Belgrade
Cycling Federation of Serbia	Summer	Belgrade
Serbian Diving Association	Summer	Belgrade
Federation for Equestrian Sport of Serbia	Summer	Belgrade
Fencing Federation of Serbia	Summer	Belgrade
Football Association of Serbia	Summer	Belgrade
Golf Association of Serbia	Summer	Belgrade
Gymnastics Federation of Serbia	Summer	Belgrade
Handball Federation of Serbia	Summer	Belgrade
Serbian Hockey Association	Summer	Belgrade
Serbian Ice Hockey Association	Winter	Belgrade
Judo Federation of Serbia	Summer	Belgrade
Karate Federation of Serbia	Summer	Belgrade
Serbian Luge Association	Winter	Belgrade
Serbian Rowing Federation	Summer	Belgrade
Rugby Union of Serbia	Summer	Belgrade
Serbian Sailing Association	Summer	Belgrade
Serbian Shooting Sport Federation	Summer	Belgrade
Serbian Skating Association	Winter	Belgrade
Ski Association of Serbia	Winter	Belgrade
Softball Federation of Serbia	Summer	Belgrade
Serbian Swimming Federation	Summer	Belgrade
Synchronized Swimming Federation of Serbia	Summer	Belgrade
Table Tennis Association of Serbia	Summer	Belgrade
Serbian Taekwondo Association	Summer	Belgrade
Tennis Federation of Serbia	Summer	Belgrade
Serbian Triathlon Union	Summer	Belgrade
Volleyball Federation of Serbia	Summer	Belgrade
Serbia Water Polo Federation	Summer	Belgrade
Serbian Weightlifting Federation	Summer	Belgrade
Wrestling Federation of Serbia	Summer	Belgrade

=== Other Federations ===
National Federation	Headquarters
Coaches Association of Serbia	Belgrade
Olympians Association of Serbia	Belgrade
Paralympic Committee of Serbia	Belgrade
Sports Association of Serbia	Belgrade
Sports Medicine Association of Serbia	Belgrade

== Awards ==
In 1994, the Yugoslav Olympic Committee began giving awards to the most successful athletes from each calendar year. Initially, the awards were given to the best male and female athletes, but this was later expanded to include the best men’s and women’s teams, coaches, youth athletes and youth teams. The awards are presently given to athletes who have achieved results in current Olympic sports, as well as in the Chess Olympiad.

== Logos ==
Olympic Committee of Serbia Logo (2006–2011, Cyrillic)

Olympic Committee of Serbia Logo (2006–2011, Latin)

== See also ==
- Serbia at the Olympics
- List of Yugoslav Olympic medalists
