= German–Yugoslav Partisan negotiations =

March 1943 ceasefire and prisoner exchange talks

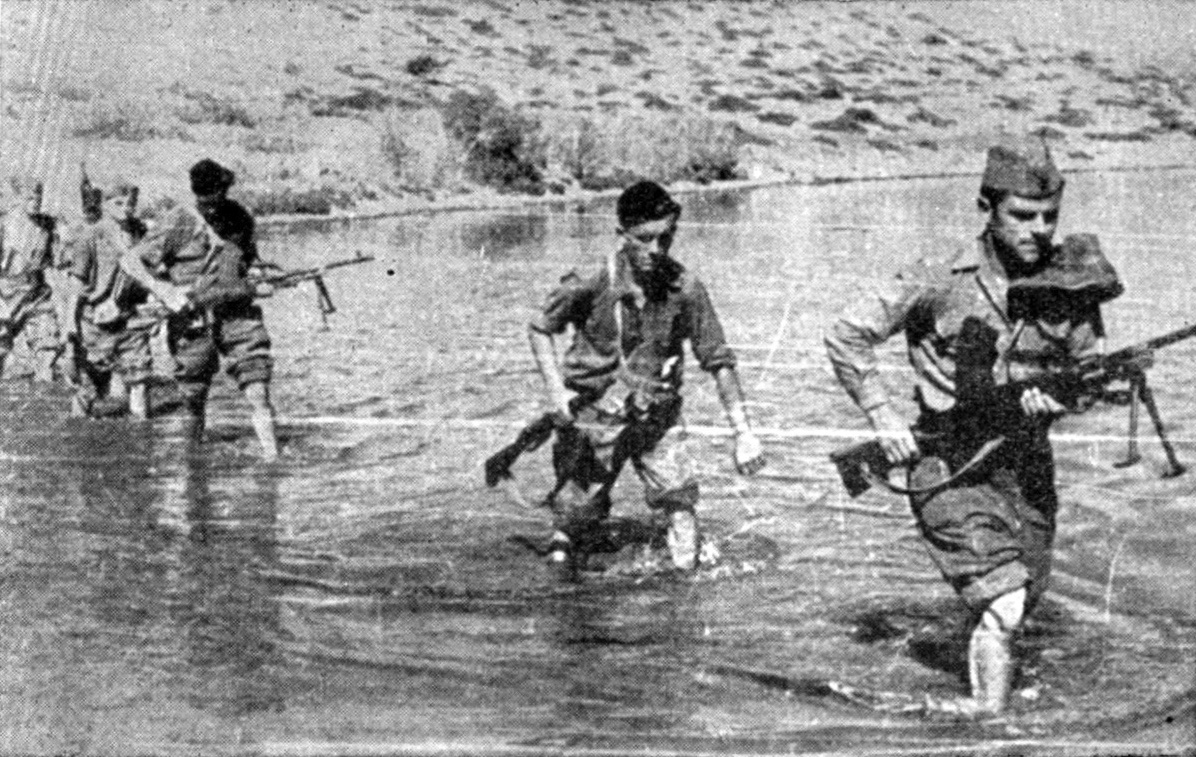
Yugoslav Partisans wading across the Mrežnica river in the Independent State of Croatia in 1943

The German–Yugoslav Partisan negotiations (Serbo-Croatian: Martovski pregovori, lit. 'March negotiations') were held between German commanders in the Independent State of Croatia and the Supreme Headquarters of the Yugoslav Partisans in March 1943 during World War II. The negotiations – focused on obtaining a ceasefire and establishing a prisoner exchange – were conducted during the Axis Operation Weiss offensive. They were used by the Partisans to delay the Axis forces while the Partisans crossed the Neretva River, and to allow the Partisans to focus on attacking their Chetnik rivals led by Draža Mihailović. The negotiations were accompanied by an informal ceasefire that lasted about six weeks before being called off on orders from Adolf Hitler. The short-term advantage gained by the Partisans through the negotiations was lost when the Axis Operation Schwarz offensive was launched in mid-May 1943. Prisoner exchanges, which had been occurring between the Germans and Partisans for some months prior, re-commenced in late 1943 and continued until the end of the war.

Details of the negotiations were little known by historians until the 1970s, despite being mentioned by several authors from 1949 on. The key Partisan negotiator, Milovan Đilas, was first named in Walter Roberts' Tito, Mihailović, and the Allies, 1941–1945 in 1973. Roberts' book was met with protests from the Yugoslav government of Josip Broz Tito. The objections centred on claims that Roberts was effectively equating the German–Partisan negotiations with the collaboration agreements concluded by various Chetnik leaders with the Italians and Germans during the war. Roberts denied this, but added that the book did not accept the mythology of the Partisans as a "liberation movement" or the Chetniks as "traitorous collaborators". Subsequently, accounts of the negotiations were published by Yugoslav historians and the main Yugoslav protagonists.

== Background ==
In August 1942, during the Partisan Long March west through the Independent State of Croatia (Croatian: Nezavisna Država Hrvatska, NDH), Josip Broz Tito's Yugoslav Partisans captured a group of eight Germans from the civil and military engineering group Organisation Todt near Livno. The leader of the captured group was a mining engineer, Hans Ott, who was also an officer of the Abwehr, the Wehrmacht's intelligence organisation. The captured group had been identifying new sources of metal and timber for the Germans, but Ott had also been tasked by the Abwehr with making contact with the Partisans. Following their capture, Ott told his captors that he had an important message to deliver to Partisan headquarters, and after he had been taken there he suggested to the Partisans that his group be exchanged for Partisans held by the Germans in jails in Zagreb. On that basis, Ott was sent to Zagreb on parole, where he met with the German Plenipotentiary General in Croatia, General der Infanterie (Lieutenant General) Edmund Glaise-Horstenau. He advised Glaise-Horstenau that Tito was willing to exchange the eight Germans for ten Partisans who were being held by the Germans, Italians and NDH authorities. Glaise-Horstenau contacted the commander of the Italian 2nd Army, Generale designato d'Armata (acting General) Mario Roatta, who had most of the identified Partisan prisoners in his custody. On 14 August, the German ambassador to the NDH, SA-Obergruppenführer (Lieutenant General) Siegfried Kasche, sent a telegram to the Reich Foreign Ministry advising of the proposed exchange and asked the Ministry to intercede with the Italians. In his book Tito, Mihailović, and the Allies, 1941–1945, published in 1973, the former US diplomat Walter Roberts argued that the Abwehr considered some sort of modus vivendi with the Partisans might be possible, and were thinking of more than prisoner exchanges when they gave Ott the task of making contact with the Partisans. The number of Germans in Partisan custody had been increasing, and this made some sort of prisoner swap agreement more likely. These agreements were initially led by Marijan Stilinović on behalf of the Partisan Supreme Headquarters. On 5 September, a prisoner swap was completed in an area between Duvno and Livno, where 38 Partisans and family members were exchanged for one senior German officer who had been captured during the Battle of Livno in December 1942.

Continuing negotiations between the Germans and Partisan headquarters resulted in a further prisoner exchange on 17 November 1942. The second of these was negotiated by Stilinović and Vladimir Velebit, also a member of the Partisan Supreme Headquarters, and Ott was involved on the German side. On the day of the second prisoner exchange, the Partisans delivered a letter addressed to Glaise-Horstenau which apparently explained that the Partisans were "an independent armed force with military discipline and not an agglomeration of bands", and "proposed mutual application of the rules of international law, especially in regard to prisoners and wounded, a regular exchange of prisoners, and a sort of armistice between the two sides". Glaise-Horstenau, Kasche and others wanted to continue exchanging prisoners as a means of obtaining intelligence, and also wanted a modus vivendi with the Partisans to allow the Germans to exploit the mineral resources of the NDH without disruption. In particular, they wanted to minimise disruption in the NDH south of the Sava River and on the Zagreb–Belgrade railway line. Adolf Hitler and Reich Foreign Minister Joachim von Ribbentrop were opposed to a modus vivendi, as they were afraid it would give the Partisans the status of a regular belligerent. As a result of Hitler's opposition, this Partisan proposal was not answered.

== March negotiations ==
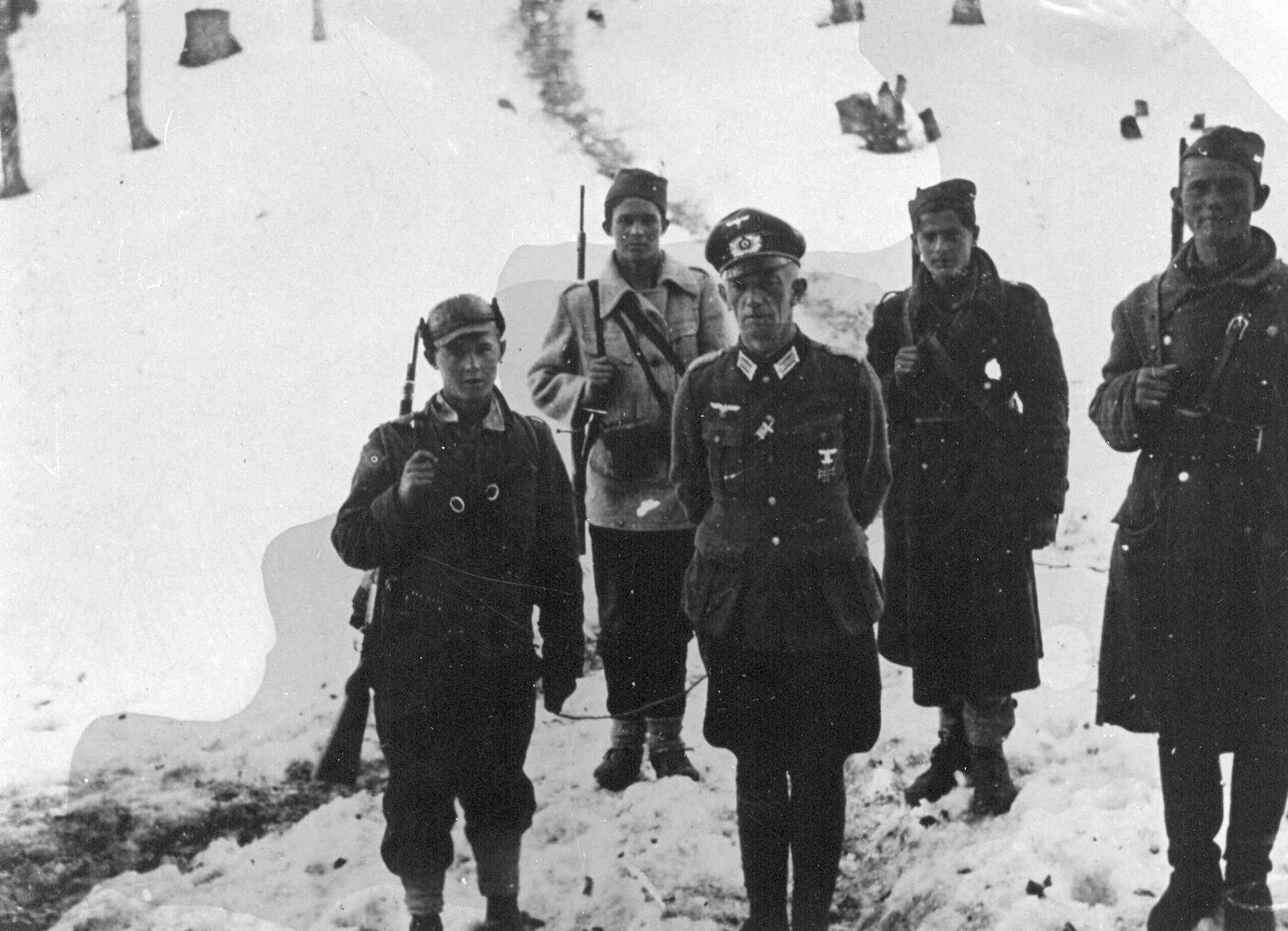
Partisans with captured German major Arthur Strecker, who was offered in exchange for captured partisans.

From 20 January 1943, the Partisans had been hard-pressed by the Axis Operation Weiss offensive. Throughout that offensive, Partisan Supreme Headquarters engaged the Germans in negotiations to gain time to cross the Neretva River. In late February or early March 1943, the Partisans captured a German officer and about 25 soldiers, who joined about 100 Croatian Home Guards, and 15 Italian officers and 600 soldiers already being held as prisoners of war by the Partisans. Due to their desperate situation at this stage of Operation Weiss, and their need to delay the Axis in order to cross the Neretva river before the Germans struck, they decided to use the recently captured German officer to initiate negotiations. The German historians Ladislaus Hory and Martin Broszat concluded that at this critical period, Tito was also concerned that by the end of the war the attrition to his Partisan forces would be such that Mihailović's Chetniks would be more powerful. They suggest that Tito may have been willing to agree to a truce with the Germans in order to destroy the Chetniks.

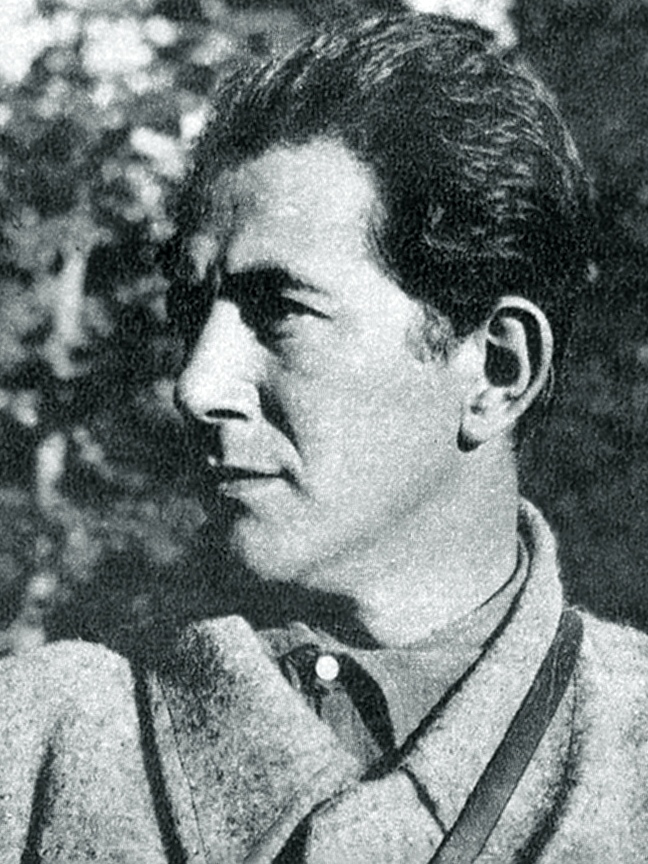
Milovan Đilas was the main Partisan delegate for the negotiations at both Gornji Vakuf and Zagreb.

The negotiations commenced on 11 March 1943 in Gornji Vakuf. According to the historian Jozo Tomasevich, the three Partisans tasked with the negotiations show the importance that the Partisans placed on the outcome. They were: Koča Popović, Spanish Civil War veteran and commander of the 1st Proletarian Division; Milovan Đilas, a member of the Partisan Supreme Headquarters and member of the Politburo of the Communist Party of Yugoslavia (using the alias of Miloš Marković); and Velebit (using the alias of Dr. Vladimir Petrović). The German negotiators were led by the commander of the 717th Infantry Division Generalleutnant (Major General) Benignus Dippold, one of his staff officers and a Hitler Youth representative. In their written statement, the Partisans:

- identified their prisoners and indicated who they wanted in exchange, emphasising that they wanted to complete the exchange as soon as possible;
- said that if the Germans accepted the Partisan proposal, especially in regard to the wounded and captured, the Partisans would reciprocate;
- stated that Partisan Supreme Headquarters believed that, given the circumstances, there was no reason for the Germans to attack the Partisans, and it would be in the interests of both if hostilities stopped and areas of responsibilities were agreed;
- stated that they considered the Chetniks their main enemies;
- proposed that an armistice should apply during the negotiations; and
- required a signature from their higher headquarters on any final agreement.

Popović returned to report to Tito, and the Wehrmacht Commander South-East Generaloberst (Senior General) Alexander Löhr approved an informal ceasefire while the talks continued. On 17 March, Kasche reported on the negotiations to the Reich Foreign Ministry, requesting approval to continue discussions, and asking for instructions. The following is an extract from Kasche's telegram:

Under circumstances possibility exists that Tito will demonstratively turn his back on Moscow and London who left him in the lurch. The wishes of the Partisans are: Fight against the Chetniks in the Sandžak, thereafter return to their villages and pacification in Croatian and Serbian areas; return of camp-followers to their villages after they are disarmed; no executions of leading Partisans on our part... It is my opinion that this possibility should be pursued since secession from the enemy of this fighting force highly regarded in world opinion would be very important. In fact, the Tito Partisans are, in their masses, not Communists and in general have not committed extraordinary excesses in their battles and in the treatment of prisoners and the population. I refer to previous written reports and also to my conversation with State Secretary von Weizsäcker. Request instructions. In talks with Casertano [Italian Minister in Zagreb] and Lorković [Croatian Foreign Minister] I found that the above development would be treated positively.

— Siegfried Kasche

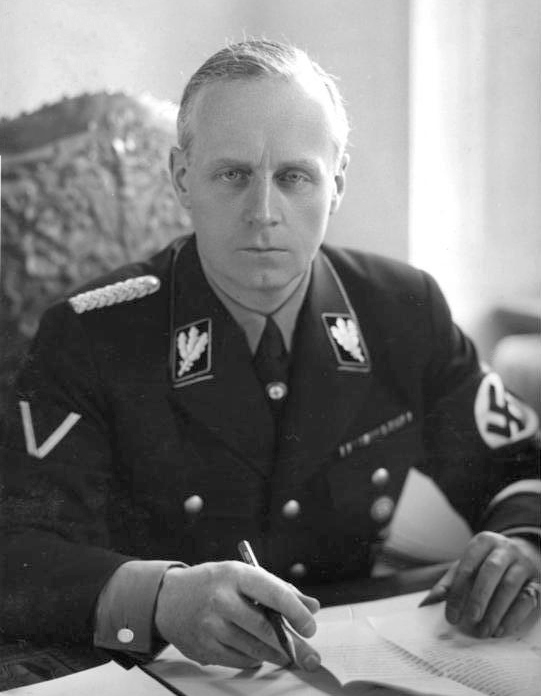
In late March 1943, Reich Foreign Minister Joachim von Ribbentrop prohibited any further negotiations with the Partisans.

According to Roberts, it is clear that the next phase of negotiations was intended to go beyond prisoner exchanges, as the prisoner of war negotiator Stilinović was not involved. Đilas and Velebit were passed through the German lines to Sarajevo and were then flown to Zagreb on 25 March in a military aircraft. These negotiations were with German representatives supervised by Ott, apparently on all the points discussed at Gornji Vakuf, and the Partisans made it clear to the Germans that their proposals did not amount to an offer of surrender. Velebit met personally with Glaise-Horstenau, as the Austrian had known Velebit's father, a Yugoslav general. After this first visit to Zagreb, Velebit visited Partisan commanders in Slavonia and eastern Bosnia passing on orders for the suspension of attacks on the Germans and their rail communications, and the release of prisoners.

Kasche had not received a reply to his telegram of 17 March, so he sent a further telegram to von Ribbentrop on 26 March. In it he advised that two Partisan representatives had arrived in Zagreb for negotiations, and named them using their aliases. He pointed out that the Partisan interest in an armistice had increased, and emphasised that he considered this a significant development. By this time, Đilas and Velebit had returned to Zagreb, where they reiterated that the Partisans wanted recognition as a regular belligerent, and emphasised the futility of continued fighting. They effectively asked to be left alone to fight the Chetniks. According to Pavlowitch, it is not clear which side posed the question of what the Partisans would do if the British were to land in Yugoslavia without Partisan authorisation. Đilas and Velebit said they would fight them as well as the Germans. They stated that their propaganda had been slanted towards the Soviet Union because they did not want to communicate with London. Their determination to fight the British if they landed was because they believed that the British would try to thwart their objective of seizing power in Yugoslavia. The Partisans also believed that the British were clandestine supporters of Chetnik collaboration. Đilas and Velebit further stated that the Chetniks would not fight the British because such a landing was exactly what they were waiting for.

Von Ribbentrop responded on 29 March, prohibiting all further contact with the Partisans and inquiring about what evidence Kasche had gathered to support his optimistic conclusions. When told of the talks with the Partisans, Hitler apparently responded, "One does not negotiate with rebels—rebels must be shot". On 31 March, Kasche responded with a further telegram, saying that there had been no direct contact with Tito, and contradicted his earlier telegram by stating that the contacts had been strictly about prisoner exchanges. Kasche stated that Tito had abided by his promises thus far, and:

I think the Partisan question is misjudged by us. Our fight therefore has been practically without success anywhere. It should be based more on political and less on military means. Complete victory over the Partisans is unattainable militarily or through police measures. Military measures can destroy clearly defined areas of revolt, security measures can discover communications and serve to finish off Partisans and their helpers. The extent of success depends on troops and time available. If both are scarce the possibility of political solutions should not be rejected out of hand.

— Siegfried Kasche

Kasche further stated that it would be useful from a military perspective if the Partisans were allowed to fight the Chetniks without German interference, and counselled against trying to fight the Partisans and the Chetniks at the same time. On 30 March, Đilas had returned to Partisan headquarters with 12 more Partisans that had been held in the Ustaše-run Jasenovac concentration camp. Velebit remained in Zagreb to complete a further task: he successfully arranged the release of a detained Slovenian communist, Herta Haas, who was Tito's wife and the mother of his two-year-old son, Aleksandar.

== Reaction and aftermath ==
Mihailović was the first to receive reports of contact between the Germans and Partisans, and passed them on to his British Special Operations Executive liaison officer, Colonel Bill Bailey. When Bailey's report arrived in London on 22 March, it was not taken seriously. Italian military intelligence also became aware of the talks. Tito himself mentioned the prisoner exchanges to the Comintern in Moscow, but when they realised more was being discussed and demanded an explanation, Tito was taken aback. He responded that he was not getting any external support, and needed to look after the interests of captured Partisans and refugees.

German–Partisan prisoner exchanges re-commenced in late 1943, but became the responsibility of the Partisan Chief Headquarters for Croatia rather than Partisan Supreme Headquarters. Initially these were organised by Stilinović, then by Dr. Josip Brnčić, before Boris Bakrač took over the role. Between March 1944 and May 1945, Bakrač attended about 40 meetings with German representatives, 25 of which were in Zagreb under agreements for safe conduct. On the German side, Ott continued to play a leading role. These negotiations resulted in the exchange of between 600 and 800 Partisans in total.

== Historiography ==
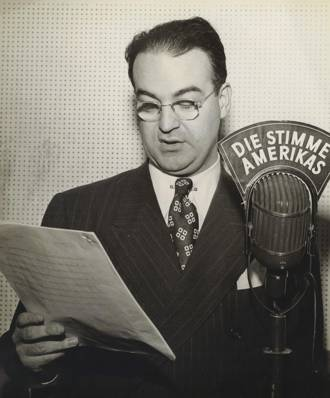
Walter Roberts broadcasting on Voice of America. Roberts' book, published in 1973, drew the ire of the Yugoslav government.

The negotiations were first mentioned publicly in 1949 when Stephen Clissold published his Whirlwind: An Account of Marshal Tito's Rise to Power. This was closely followed by Wilhelm Höttl's Die Geheime Front, Organisation, Personen und Aktionen des deutschen Geheimdienstes (The Secret Front, the Organisation, People and Activities of the German Secret Service) in 1950. There was another mention in a book published in German in 1956, Generalmajor Rudolf Kiszling's Die Kroaten. Der Schicksalsweg eines Südslawenvolkes (The Croats: The Fateful Path of a South Slav People). Ilija Jukić obtained evidence from German Foreign Ministry sources, which he included in his 1965 book Pogledi na prošlost, sadašnjost i budućnost hrvatskog naroda (Views on the Past, Present and Future of the Croatian Nation), published in London. In 1967, the Yugoslav historian Mišo Leković was officially commissioned to produce a full report on the talks. In 1969, Ivan Avakumović published his Mihailović prema nemačkim dokumentima (Mihailović according to German documents), which used captured German military documents.

In 1973, Roberts published Tito, Mihailović, and the Allies, 1941–1945 which included information about the German–Partisan negotiations of March 1943. The publishing of the book disturbed the Yugoslav government, which lodged a complaint with the US Department of State. The thrust of the Yugoslav complaint was that the book equated the Partisans with the Chetniks. Roberts denied this, stating that his book did not equate the two or accept the Partisan mythology of the Partisans as a "liberation movement" or the Chetniks as "traitorous collaborators". The book also identified Đilas as the main negotiator. In 1977, Đilas confirmed his involvement in his book Wartime, but stated that he would not have disclosed the details of the negotiations if it had not already been known through Roberts' book. In 1978, Tito admitted that the negotiations occurred, but characterised their purpose as "solely to obtain German recognition of belligerent status for the Partisans". In 1985, after Tito's death, Leković was able to publish the results of his investigation that had started in 1967, in Martovski pregovori 1943 (The March Negotiations 1943). In 1989, Popović gave his version of events in Aleksandar Nenadović's Razgovori s Kočom (Conversations with Koča), followed by Velebit in Mira Šuvar's Vladimir Velebit: svjedok historije (Vladimir Velebit: Witness to History) in 2001, and in his own Tajne i zamke Drugog svjetskog rata (Secrets and Traps of the Second World War) the following year.
