= Broz =

Broz (Croatian pronunciation: [brôːz]) is a Croatian surname. It is derived from the given name Àmbrōzije, corresponding to English Ambrose. Notable people with the surname include:

- Ivan Broz (1852–1893), Croatian linguist and literary historian
- Josip Broz Tito (1892–1980), revolutionary and statesman
- Joška Broz (1947–2025), Serbian politician, grandson of Tito
- Jovanka Broz (1924–2013), widow of Yugoslav leader Josip Broz Tito
- Mišo Broz (born 1941), Croatian diplomat, son of Tito
- Saša Broz (born 1968), Croatian theatre and television director, granddaughter of Tito
- Svetlana Broz (1955–2025), Bosnian author and physician, granddaughter of Tito

== See also ==
- Brozović
