= Milorad Unković =

Serbian politician

- Милорад Унковић
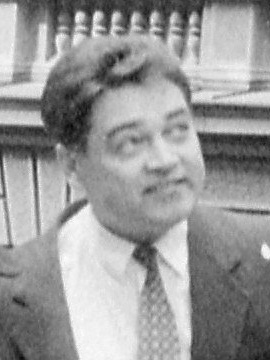

Mayor of Belgrade
- In office 4 December 1989 – 2 July 1992
- Preceded by: Aleksandar Bakočević
- Succeeded by: Slobodanka Gruden

Personal details
- Born: 19 July 1945 Nevesinje, DF Yugoslavia
- Died: 12 July 2013 (aged 67) Belgrade, Serbia
- Party: Socialist Party of Serbia
- Education: University of Belgrade Faculty of Economics

Milorad Unković (Serbian Cyrillic: Милорад Унковић; 19 July 1945 – 12 July 2013) was a Serbian politician who served as the Mayor of Belgrade from 4 December 1989 to 2 July 1992.

Political offices
Preceded by Aleksandar Bakočević	Mayor of Belgrade; 1989–1992	Succeeded by Slobodanka Gruden
