= Boris Bakrač =

Croatian and Yugoslav politician and civil engineer

- Born: 25 March 1912; Požega, Kingdom of Croatia-Slavonia, Austria-Hungary (now Croatia)
- Died: 29 November 1989 (aged 77); Zagreb, Socialist Republic of Croatia, Socialist Federal Republic of Yugoslavia
- Other name: Ivo Zuljević
- Education: University of Zagreb
- Occupations: Civil engineer, politician
- Political party: League of Communists of Yugoslavia; League of Communists of Croatia

Boris Bakrač (25 March 1912 in Požega – 29 November 1989 in Zagreb) was a Croatian civil engineer and politician. Bakrač graduated from the University of Zagreb in 1936 before starting a career in civil engineering. After the outbreak of the World War II and the Invasion of Yugoslavia, he joined the Communist Party of Yugoslavia, as its covert agent in Zagreb in 1942. A year later, the Partisan resistance command in Croatia appointed Bakrač the chief negotiator for prisoner exchanges with the Axis powers within the framework of the German–Yugoslav Partisan negotiations. He oversaw exchange of a total of 700 to 800 Axis-held prisoners of war in the process. He conducted the negotiations under the pseudonym Ivo Zuljević to conceal his identity.

In 1944, following the Belgrade offensive, Bakrač evacuated Mišo Broz, the youngest son of the Yugoslav Partisan leader Josip Broz Tito, from Zagreb to Belgrade. Mišo was born in Zagreb shortly after the outbreak of the war. He and his mother Herta Haas remained in the city and in the nearby area of Hrvatsko Zagorje aided by Partisan supporters.

After the war, Bakrač was the deputy minister and then minister of construction in the government of the People's Republic of Croatia between 1945 and 1951. From 1958 to 1963, Bakrač again became a member of the Croatian government. He was a member of the Croatian Sabor until 1974, serving as the deputy president of its executive committee from 1969 to 1972, and the deputy Speaker from 1972 to 1974. In 1975–1978, he was a member of the Presidnecy of Croatia tasked with international relations. Bakrač was also a member of the Assembly of Yugoslavia from 1953 to 1957, and a member of the Central Committee of the League of Communists of Croatia from 1954 to 1974.

At various times, Bakrač was the President of the Association of Engineers and Technicians of Croatia, the President of the Tourist Association of Croatia, the President of the Federal Chamber of Civil Engineers of Yugoslavia, the President of the Croatian Football Federation, the President of the Croatian Sports Association, and the President of the Yugoslav Olympic Committee. In 1960, he became a permanent member of the International Olympic Committee. In 1987, Bakrač received the Silver Olympic Order.
