= Serbian Swimming Federation =

Swimming Association of Serbia

- Пливачки савез Србије; Plivački savez Srbije
- Sport: swimming
- Abbreviation: PSS
- Founded: 1904
- Affiliation: International Swimming Federation (FINA); European Swimming League (LEN)
- Location: Belgrade, Serbia
- President: Boris Drobac

Official website
- www.serbia-swim.org.rs

The Serbian Swimming Federation, also known as the Swimming Association of Serbia (Serbian: Пливачки савез Србије / Plivački savez Srbije; abbr. ПСС / PSS), is the governing body of swimming in Serbia. It carries out its activities directly and through three regional associations: Swimming Federation of Vojvodina, Swimming Federation of Belgrade and Swimming Federation of Central Serbia. It is an independent sports organization, member of the LEN (the European Swimming League), FINA (International Swimming Federation), Sports Association of Serbia, Olympic Committee of Serbia.

It is based in Belgrade and its current president is Boris Drobac.

== See also ==
- List of Serbian records in swimming
