= Yugoslavia in War 1941–1945 =

- Written by: Božidar Nikolić
- Directed by: Milan Kundaković
- Starring: Nora Beloff; Basil Davidson; Milovan Đilas; Veselin Đuretić; Venceslav Glišić; Tomislav Karađorđević; Bogdan Krizman; Stevan K. Pavlowitch; Branko Petranović; Čedomir Popov; Radmila Radić; Enver Redžić; Holm Sundhaussen; Vladimir Velebit; Svetozar Vukmanović Tempo
- Country of origin: FR Yugoslavia
- Original languages: Serbo-Croatian, German, English, Italian, Slovenian
- No. of episodes: 23 regular + 2 special

Production
- Producer: Božidar Nikolić
- Running time: 50–95 minutes

Original release
- Release: 1992

Yugoslavia in War 1941–1945 (Serbo-Croatian: Југославија у рату 1941–1945., Jugoslavija u ratu 1941–1945.) is a Radio Television of Serbia (RTS) documentary series first broadcast in the early 1990s. The documentary includes participants and eyewitnesses from the war, as well as notable Yugoslav, British, German, Russian and Italian historians, publicists and journalists. The documentary attempts to provide multiple viewpoints for significant events of that time period.

== Episodes ==
Number	Title	Original title	Overview	Contributors
1	March 27	27. mart	Yugoslav coup d'état	
2	April 6	6. april	Invasion of Yugoslavia	
3	April 10	10. travanj	Creation of Independent State of Croatia	
4	Serbia, Spring 1941	Srbija, proleće 1941.	Creation of Territory of the Military Commander in Serbia	
5	Serbia, Summer 1941	Serbia, leto 1941.	Uprising in Serbia	
6	Serbia, Fall 1941	Srbija, jesen 1941.	Partisan-Chetnik split and beginning of civil war, Operation Užice	
7	July 13	13. juli	13 July uprising, battle of Pljevlja	
8	Independent State of Croatia - Ustashe Revolution	NDH - ustaška revolucija	Ustashe atrocities in 1941, Glina massacre, creation of Anti-Communist Volunteer Militia	
9	Independent State of Croatia - The Flower of Croatdom	NDH - cvijet hrvatsva	Bosnia and Bosnian Muslims in 1941	
10	Preemptive Liquidations	Preventive likvidacije	Leftist errors	
11	Dark Side of Pacification of Independent State of Croatia	Naličje pacifikacije NDH	Creation of Croatian Orthodox Church, Ustasha-Chetnik collaboration, Battle of Kozara	
12	Pacification of Serbia	Umirivanje Srbije	Government of National Salvation, war crimes in Serbia 1941–1944	
13	Yugoslav Government in Exile	Jugoslovenska vlada u izbeglištvu	Yugoslav Government in Exile	
14	Black and White	Crno i belo	Republic of Bihać, Operation Weiss, March negotiations, Operation Schwarz	
15	Federations	Federacije	Plans of all sides for post-war organization of Yugoslav territories	
16	British Bet or Conspiracy	Britanski ulog ili zavera	Role of SOE in Churchill's decision to abandon Chetniks and support partisans	
17	A State of Reconciliation	Država pomirenja	Second session of AVNOJ	
18	British Finale	Britanska završnica	Vis Agreement	
19	Vendée	Vandeja	Civilian life in occupied Serbia, Ba Congress, Chetniks in 1943–44	
20	Migration	Selidba	Liberation of Serbia and Belgrade Offensive	
21	Stalin's Finale	Staljinova završnica	Temporary Government of the Democratic Federal Yugoslavia	
22	May	Maj	Syrmian Front and the end of the war	
23	War Stories	Ratne priče	Personal stories, anecdotes, and commentary by war participants	
special episode	Stepinac – Saint or Criminal?	Stepinac – svetac ili zločinac?	Alojzije Stepinac and Catholic clergy involvement with the Ustaše	
special episode	Slovenia	Slovenija	World War II in the Slovene Lands	

== Contributors ==
=== Direct participants and eyewitnesses ===
==== Members of Yugoslav government and Yugoslav Royal Army ====
- Prince Alexander of Yugoslavia
- Prince Tomislav of Yugoslavia
- Nikola Kosić, a mayor of YRA
- Svetozar Lolić

==== Partisans ====
- Milovan Đilas
- Vladimir Velebit
- Svetozar Vukmanović Tempo
- Vlado Dapčević
- Milutin Morača
- Nikola Ilić
- Milan Basta
- Mihailo Švabić
- Mirko Stanojković
- Mihajlo Đurđević
- Aleksandar Stevanović
- Zoran Milentijević
- Jože Žukovec
- Ante Klarić
- Vera Sarić
- Aleksandar Krunić
- Mihailo Marković

==== Chetniks ====
- Miomir Kolarević
- Branko Mihailović, son of Dragoljub Mihailović
- Radoban Dubak, a flag bearer of Pavle Đurišić
- Vladan Radosavljević, son of a Chetnik commander

==== Others ====
- Claus Vogell, a captain of Wehrmacht
- Julian Amery
- Peter Kemp
- Ljuban Jednak, the sole survivor of Glina massacre

=== Historians, publicists and journalists ===
==== Yugoslavs ====
- Branko Petranović (also a partisan during the war)
- Mile Bjelajac
- Čedomir Popov
- Bogdan Krizman
- Dušan Bilandžić (also a partisan during the war)
- Aleksandar Kasaš
- Radmila Radić
- Savo Skoko (also a partisan during the war)
- Enver Redžić (also a partisan during the war)
- Stevan K. Pavlowitch
- Milan Koljanin
- Radmila Radić
- Čedomir Janić
- Feliks Pašić
- Jaša Almuli
- Smilja Avramov
- Milan Ristović
- Rasim Hurem
- Dragan Ćirić
- Dragoljub Živojinović
- Gojko Miljanić
- Dragoljub Mirčetić (also a partisan during the war)

==== Foreign ====
- Holm Sundhaussen
- Manfred Messerschmidt
- Karl-Heinz Schlarp
- Basil Davidson
- Michael McConville
- Igor Buharkin
- Leonid Gibiansky
- Francesco Privitera
