= Electoral firsts in Serbia =

This article lists notable achievements of women, ethnic minorities, people with disabilities, and LGBT people in Serbian politics.

== Women ==
- Ana Brnabić, first female Prime Minister of Serbia
- Nataša Mićić, first female President of the National Assembly of Serbia
- Ljiljana Ćuić, first female to contest the presidency of Serbia (1990 election)
- Slobodanka Gruden, first female mayor of Belgrade
- Maja Gojković, first female President of the Government of Vojvodina

== LGBT ==
- Ana Brnabić, first lesbian government minister
- Ana Brnabić, first lesbian Prime Minister of Serbia
- Ana Brnabić, first lesbian President of the National Assembly of Serbia
