= Bakočević =

Bakočević (Serbian Cyrillic: Бакочевић) is a Montenegrin surname that originates from Montenegro. The Bakočevići was a brotherhood (bratstvo) of the Kuči from Zatrijebač. The family name is found in Kuči and Rovca in Montenegro, and Zlatibor and Mačva in Serbia. The families have the krsna slava (patron saint) of St. John (Jovanjdan). It may refer to:

People

- Aleksandar Bakočević, Yugoslav Serbian politician
- Radmila Bakočević, Serbian soprano
- Nebojša Bakočević, Serbian actor
- Vaso Bakočević, Montenegrin MMA fighter
