= List of Serbian records in Olympic weightlifting =

The following are the national records in Olympic weightlifting in Serbia. Records are maintained in each weight class for the snatch lift, clean and jerk lift, and the total for both lifts by the Serbian Weightlifting Federation (Савез Србије за дизање тегова).

== Current records ==
=== Men ===
Event	Record	Athlete	Date	Meet	Place	Ref
60 kg
Snatch	110 kg	Stevan Vladisavljev	20 April 2026	European Championships	Batumi, Georgia	
Clean & Jerk	135 kg	Stevan Vladisavljev	20 April 2026	European Championships	Batumi, Georgia	
Total	245 kg	Stevan Vladisavljev	20 April 2026	European Championships	Batumi, Georgia	
65 kg
Snatch	114 kg	Stevan Vladisavljev	20 September 2026	Serbian Championships	Sombor, Serbia	
Clean & Jerk	141 kg	Stevan Vladisavljev	20 September 2026	Serbian Championships	Sombor, Serbia	
Total	255 kg	Stevan Vladisavljev	20 September 2026	Serbian Championships	Sombor, Serbia	
70 kg
Snatch	105 kg	Standard				
Clean & Jerk	134 kg	Aleksandar Saulić	20 September 2026	Serbian Championships	Sombor, Serbia	
Total	238 kg	Standard				
75 kg
Snatch	110 kg	Standard				
Clean & Jerk	137 kg	Standard				
Total	247 kg	Standard				
85 kg
Snatch	125 kg	Balázs Bencsik Masa	15 August 2026	Subotica Cup	Subotica, Serbia	
Clean & Jerk	157 kg	Balázs Bencsik Masa	15 August 2026	Subotica Cup	Subotica, Serbia	
Total	282 kg	Balázs Bencsik Masa	15 August 2026	Subotica Cup	Subotica, Serbia	
95 kg
Snatch	125 kg	Standard				
Clean & Jerk	155 kg	Standard				
Total	280 kg	Standard				
110 kg
Snatch	140 kg	Mihajlo Šijak	15 August 2026	Subotica Cup	Subotica, Serbia	
Clean & Jerk	162 kg	Standard				
Total	294 kg	Mihajlo Šijak	15 March 2026		Sombor, Serbia	
+110 kg
Snatch	140 kg	Standard				
Clean & Jerk	175 kg	Standard				
Total	315 kg	Standard				

=== Women ===
Event	Record	Athlete	Date	Meet	Place	Ref
49 kg
Snatch	62 kg	Standard				
Clean & Jerk	75 kg	Standard				
Total	137 kg	Standard				
53 kg
Snatch	73 kg	Radmila Zagorac	15 August 2026	Subotica Cup	Subotica, Serbia	
Snatch	75 kg	Radmila Zagorac	29 October 2026	World Championships	Ningbo, China	
Clean & Jerk	95 kg	Radmila Zagorac	31 August 2026	Mediterranean Games	San Giorgio Ionico, Italy	
Total	168 kg	Radmila Zagorac	31 August 2026	Mediterranean Games	San Giorgio Ionico, Italy	
57 kg
Snatch	68 kg	Standard				
Clean & Jerk	83 kg	Standard				
Total	152 kg	Standard				
61 kg
Snatch	72 kg	Standard				
Clean & Jerk	86 kg	Standard				
Total	158 kg	Standard				
69 kg
Snatch	85 kg	Tamara Arunović	15 March 2026		Belgrade, Serbia	
Clean & Jerk	103 kg	Aleksandra Jeremić	15 March 2026		Belgrade, Serbia	
Total	185 kg	Aleksandra Jeremić	15 March 2026		Belgrade, Serbia	
77 kg
Snatch	78 kg	Standard				
Clean & Jerk	100 kg	Aleksandra Prokić	5 October 2025		Sombor, Serbia	
Total	176 kg	Aleksandra Prokić	5 October 2025		Sombor, Serbia	
86 kg
Snatch	84 kg	Standard				
Clean & Jerk	103 kg	Standard				
Total	187 kg	Standard				
+86 kg
Snatch	88 kg	Standard				
Clean & Jerk	108 kg	Standard				
Total	196 kg	Standard				

== Historical records ==
=== Men (2018–2025) ===
Event	Record	Athlete	Date	Meet	Place	Ref
71 kg
Snatch	118 kg	Balázs Bencsik Masa	16 November 2025		Bač, Serbia	
Clean & Jerk	140 kg	Stevan Vladisavljev	16 November 2025		Bač, Serbia	
Total	254 kg	Stevan Vladisavljev	16 November 2025		Bač, Serbia	
79 kg
Snatch	122 kg	Balázs Bencsik Masa	15 March 2026		Sombor, Serbia	
Clean & Jerk	150 kg	Balázs Bencsik Masa	15 March 2026		Sombor, Serbia	
Total	272 kg	Balázs Bencsik Masa	15 March 2026		Sombor, Serbia	
88 kg
Snatch	130 kg	Uroš Dašić	28 September 2025	Serbian Championships	Belgrade, Serbia	
Clean & Jerk	160 kg	Uroš Dašić	28 September 2025	Serbian Championships	Belgrade, Serbia	
Total	290 kg	Uroš Dašić	28 September 2025	Serbian Championships	Belgrade, Serbia	
94 kg
Snatch	133 kg	Predrag Lazarević	28 September 2025	Serbian Championships	Belgrade, Serbia	
Clean & Jerk	165 kg	Mihajlo Cvetićanin	15 March 2026		Belgrade, Serbia	
Total	295 kg	Mihajlo Cvetićanin	15 March 2026		Belgrade, Serbia	

=== Men (2018–2025) ===
Event	Record	Athlete	Date	Meet	Place	Ref
55 kg
Snatch	75 kg	Miloš Jošić	24 October 2020		Bač, Serbia	
Clean & Jerk	80 kg	Miloš Jošić	24 October 2020		Bač, Serbia	
Total	155 kg	Miloš Jošić	24 October 2020		Bač, Serbia	
61 kg
Snatch	116 kg	Stevan Vladisavljev	13 February 2024	European Championships	Sofia, Bulgaria	
Clean & Jerk	141 kg	Stevan Vladisavljev	13 February 2024	European Championships	Sofia, Bulgaria	
Total	257 kg	Stevan Vladisavljev	13 February 2024	European Championships	Sofia, Bulgaria	
67 kg
Snatch	120 kg	Stevan Vladisavljev	12 November 2023		Subotica, Serbia	
Clean & Jerk	148 kg	Stevan Vladisavljev	21 September 2024		Subotica, Serbia	
Total	265 kg	Stevan Vladisavljev	24 September 2023		Subotica, Serbia	
73 kg
Snatch	118 kg	Balaž Benčik Maša	16 March 2025		Sombor, Serbia	
Clean & Jerk	145 kg	Stevan Vladisavljev	8 October 2023	Malta International Open	Cospicua, Malta	
Total	261 kg	Stevan Vladisavljev	8 October 2023	Malta International Open	Cospicua, Malta	
81 kg
Snatch	136 kg	Ervin Rožnjik	25 May 2019		Sombor, Serbia	
Clean & Jerk	170 kg	Ervin Rožnjik	14 March 2020		Bač, Serbia	
Total	302 kg	Ervin Rožnjik	14 March 2020		Bač, Serbia	
89 kg
Snatch	133 kg	Marko Stevanov	12 November 2023		Subotica, Serbia	
Clean & Jerk	160 kg	Mihajlo Cvetićanin	26 September 2021		Belgrade, Serbia	
Total	289 kg	Mihalj Pece	26 September 2021		Subotica, Serbia	
96 kg
Snatch	142 kg	Filip Bertran	7 November 2021		Subotica, Serbia	
Clean & Jerk	177 kg	Filip Bertran	1 August 2023	European Junior Championships	Bucharest, Romania	
Total	315 kg	Filip Bertran	1 August 2023	European Junior Championships	Bucharest, Romania	
102 kg
Snatch	160 kg	Nenad Kužić	13 April 2019	European Championships	Batumi, Georgia	
Clean & Jerk	200 kg	Nenad Kužić	13 April 2019	European Championships	Batumi, Georgia	
Total	360 kg	Nenad Kužić	13 April 2019	European Championships	Batumi, Georgia	
109 kg
Snatch	165 kg	Nenad Kužić	8 November 2018	World Championships	Ashgabat, Turkmenistan	
Clean & Jerk	200 kg	Nenad Kužić	8 November 2018	World Championships	Ashgabat, Turkmenistan	
Total	365 kg	Nenad Kužić	8 November 2018	World Championships	Ashgabat, Turkmenistan	
+109 kg
Snatch	177 kg	Tamaš Kajdoči	5 June 2022	European Championships	Tirana, Albania	
Clean & Jerk	226 kg	Tamaš Kajdoči	5 June 2022	European Championships	Tirana, Albania	
Total	403 kg	Tamaš Kajdoči	5 June 2022	European Championships	Tirana, Albania	

=== Men (1998–2018) ===
Event	Record	Athlete	Date	Meet	Place	Ref
–56 kg
Snatch	100.5 kg	Borivoje Macanović	17 November 2001		Novi Bečej, Serbia	
Clean & Jerk	125 kg	Nikola Alilomov	9 May 1999		Belgrade, Serbia	
Total	220 kg	Nikola Alilomov	9 May 1999		Belgrade, Serbia	
–62 kg
Snatch	115 kg	Borivoje Macanović	29 May 2004		Belgrade, Serbia	
Clean & Jerk	137 kg	Stevan Vladisavljev	4 November 2017	Vladan Mihailović Memorial	Inđija, Serbia	
Total	250 kg	Borivoje Macanović	29 May 2004		Belgrade, Serbia	
–69 kg
Snatch	118 kg	Dejan Peić Tukuljac	5 June 2010		Inđija, Serbia	
Clean & Jerk	152.5 kg	Silvester Nađ	10 October 1999		Subotica, Serbia	
Total	265 kg	Silvester Nađ	18 September 1999		Subotica, Serbia	
–77 kg
Snatch	137 kg	Ervin Rožnjik	5 October 2015	European U23 Championships	Klaipėda, Lithuania	
Clean & Jerk	170 kg	Ervin Rožnjik	5 October 2015	European U23 Championships	Klaipėda, Lithuania	
Total	307 kg	Ervin Rožnjik	5 October 2015	European U23 Championships	Klaipėda, Lithuania	
–85 kg
Snatch	137 kg	Ervin Rožnjik	18 November 2017	Mediterranean Cup	Ljubljana, Slovenia	
Clean & Jerk	168 kg	Silvester Nađ	21 October 2006		Subotica, Serbia	
Total	303 kg	Ervin Rožnjik	30 October 2016	Serbian Cup	Subotica, Serbia	
–94 kg
Snatch	156 kg	Nenad Kužić	6 December 2014	Serbian Cup	Bač, Serbia	
Clean & Jerk	187 kg	Nenad Kužić	6 December 2014	Serbian Cup	Bač, Serbia	
Total	343 kg	Nenad Kužić	6 December 2014	Serbian Cup	Bač, Serbia	
–105 kg
Snatch	165 kg	Nenad Kužić	1 May 2016	Fajr Cup	Tehran, Iran	
Clean & Jerk	205 kg	Nenad Kužić	8 October 2016	Vladan Mihajlović Memorial	Inđija, Serbia	
Total	368 kg	Nenad Kužić	1 May 2016	Fajr Cup	Tehran, Iran	
+105 kg
Snatch	180 kg	Tamaš Kajdoči	17 June 2017	World Junior Championships	Tokyo, Japan	
Clean & Jerk	225 kg	Tamaš Kajdoči	10 December 2016	European Junior Championships	Eilat, Israel	
Total	403 kg	Tamaš Kajdoči	17 June 2017	World Junior Championships	Tokyo, Japan	

=== Women (2025–2026) ===
Event	Record	Athlete	Date	Meet	Place	Ref
48 kg
Snatch	60 kg	Standard				
Snatch	72 kg	Radmila Zagorac	19 April 2026	European Championships	Batumi, Georgia	
Clean & Jerk	74 kg	Standard				
Total	134 kg	Standard				
58 kg
Snatch	68 kg	Standard				
Clean & Jerk	83 kg	Standard				
Total	152 kg	Standard				
63 kg
Snatch	87 kg	Tamara Arunović	5 October 2025		Sombor, Serbia	
Clean & Jerk	105 kg	Tamara Arunović	5 October 2025		Sombor, Serbia	
Total	192 kg	Tamara Arunović	5 October 2025		Sombor, Serbia	

=== Women (2018–2025) ===
Event	Record	Athlete	Date	Meet	Place	Ref
45 kg
Snatch	68 kg	Radmila Zagorac	28 May 2022	European Championships	Tirana, Albania	
Clean & Jerk	84 kg	Radmila Zagorac	28 May 2022	European Championships	Tirana, Albania	
Total	152 kg	Radmila Zagorac	28 May 2022	European Championships	Tirana, Albania	
49 kg
Snatch	74 kg	Radmila Zagorac	26 July 2023	European U23 Championships	Bucharest, Romania	
Clean & Jerk	92 kg	Radmila Zagorac	26 October 2024	European U23 Championships	Raszyn, Poland	
Clean & Jerk	95 kg	Radmila Zagorac	13 April 2025	European Championships	Chișinău, Moldova	
Total	161 kg	Radmila Zagorac	26 July 2023	European U23 Championships	Bucharest, Romania	
Total	169 kg	Radmila Zagorac	13 April 2025	European Championships	Chișinău, Moldova	
55 kg
Snatch	75 kg	Radmila Zagorac	11 October 2023		Sombor, Serbia	
Clean & Jerk	93 kg	Radmila Zagorac	11 October 2023		Sombor, Serbia	
Total	167 kg	Radmila Zagorac	11 October 2023		Sombor, Serbia	
59 kg
Snatch	85 kg	Tamara Arunović	11 October 2023		Sombor, Serbia	
Clean & Jerk	98 kg	Tamara Arunović	11 October 2023		Sombor, Serbia	
Total	183 kg	Tamara Arunović	11 October 2023		Sombor, Serbia	
64 kg
Snatch	89 kg	Tamara Arunović	15 February 2024	European Championships	Sofia, Bulgaria	
Clean & Jerk	113 kg	Tamara Arunović	15 February 2024	European Championships	Sofia, Bulgaria	
Total	202 kg	Tamara Arunović	15 February 2024	European Championships	Sofia, Bulgaria	
71 kg
Snatch	95 kg	Tamara Arunović	23 March 2025		Belgrade, Serbia	
Clean & Jerk	115 kg	Tamara Arunović	23 March 2025		Belgrade, Serbia	
Total	210 kg	Tamara Arunović	23 March 2025		Belgrade, Serbia	
76 kg
Snatch	76 kg	Aleksandra Prokić	6 October 2024		Sombor, Serbia	
Clean & Jerk	96 kg	Aleksandra Prokić	6 October 2024		Sombor, Serbia	
Total	172 kg	Aleksandra Prokić	6 October 2024		Sombor, Serbia	
81 kg
Snatch	100 kg	Judit Vrabel	17 November 2019		Niš, Serbia	
Clean & Jerk	110 kg	Judit Vrabel	17 November 2019		Niš, Serbia	
Total	210 kg	Judit Vrabel	17 November 2019		Niš, Serbia	
87 kg
Snatch	50 kg	Anđela Popović	17 November 2019		Niš, Serbia	
Clean & Jerk	70 kg	Danica Bjelić	6 October 2024		Sombor, Serbia	
Total	118 kg	Anđela Popović	6 October 2024		Sombor, Serbia	
+87 kg
Snatch	72 kg	Nikolina Radaković	1 November 2020		Belgrade, Serbia	
Clean & Jerk	90 kg	Nikolina Radaković	1 November 2020		Belgrade, Serbia	
Total	153 kg	Nikolina Radaković	1 November 2020		Belgrade, Serbia	

=== Women (1998–2018) ===
Event	Record	Athlete	Date	Meet	Place	Ref
–48 kg
Snatch	63 kg	Tijana Stevanović	2 April 2017	European Championships	Split, Croatia	
Clean & Jerk	82 kg	Tijana Stevanović	20 November 2016	Serbian Women's Cup	Belgrade, Serbia	
Total	144 kg	Tijana Stevanović	20 November 2016	Serbian Women's Cup	Belgrade, Serbia	
–53 kg
Snatch	55 kg	Anica Jovanović	7 June 2015	Serbian Women's Championships	Belgrade, Serbia	
Clean & Jerk	71 kg	Anica Jovanović	3 June 2017	Serbian Women's Championships	Niš, Serbia	
Total	126 kg	Anica Jovanović	3 June 2017	Serbian Women's Championships	Niš, Serbia	
–58 kg
Snatch	71 kg	Gorica Kankaraš	3 May 2008		Austria	
Clean & Jerk	88 kg	Aleksandra Prokić	10 December 2017	Serbian Women's Cup	Belgrade, Serbia	
Total	156 kg	Aleksandra Prokić	10 December 2017	Serbian Women's Cup	Belgrade, Serbia	
–63 kg
Snatch	82 kg	Silvana Vukas	15 November 2008		Sarajevo, Bosnia and Herzegovina	
Clean & Jerk	104 kg	Silvana Vukas	11 September 2010		Belgrade, Serbia	
Total	185 kg	Silvana Vukas	15 November 2008		Sarajevo, Bosnia and Herzegovina	
–69 kg
Snatch	82 kg	Silvana Vukas	8 March 2009		Sombor, Serbia	
Clean & Jerk	106 kg	Silvana Vukas	8 March 2009		Sombor, Serbia	
Total	188 kg	Silvana Vukas	8 March 2009		Sombor, Serbia	
–75 kg
Snatch	84 kg	Verica Dušanić	18 November 2017	Mediterranean Cup	Ljubljana, Slovenia	
Clean & Jerk	95 kg	Silvana Vukas	23 March 2013	Serbian Junior Championships	Belgrade, Serbia	
Total	177 kg	Verica Dušanić	18 November 2017	Mediterranean Cup	Ljubljana, Slovenia	
–90 kg
Snatch	76 kg	Verica Dušanić	3 June 2017	Serbian Women's Championships	Niš, Serbia	
Clean & Jerk	88 kg	Verica Dušanić	3 June 2017	Serbian Women's Championships	Niš, Serbia	
Total	164 kg	Verica Dušanić	3 June 2017	Serbian Women's Championships	Niš, Serbia	
+90 kg
Snatch	88 kg	Ana Perlić	3 June 2017	Serbian Women's Championships	Niš, Serbia	
Clean & Jerk	109 kg	Ana Perlić	3 June 2017	Serbian Women's Championships	Niš, Serbia	
Total	197 kg	Ana Perlić	3 June 2017	Serbian Women's Championships	Niš, Serbia	
