= Serbian Weightlifting Federation =

Weightlifting has been part of the Olympic Games program since 1896.

In the sport of weightlifting two lifts are recognised which must be executed in the following sequence:

1. the snatch
2. the clean and jerk

In the sport of weightlifting, competitions are organised for men and women. The athletes compete in specified bodyweight categories (eight men's and seven women's ) and age groups (Youth: age 13–17 years of age; Junior: 15–20; Senior: over 15 years of age; Masters: over 35).

== History ==
The Heavy Athletics Federation of Serbia was founded on June 18, 1950, in Belgrade. Its name soon changed to the Serbian Weightlifting Federation.

Serbian Weightlifting Federation continues the tradition of Heavy Athletics Federation of Yugoslavia, the Yugoslav Weightlifting Federation, and the Weightlifting Federation of Serbia and Montenegro, into the International Weightlifting Federation.

== Membership ==
Serbian Weightlifting Federation is a member of:

- International Weightlifting Federation
- European Weightlifting Federation
- Euro-Asian Regional Association for weightlifting
- Mediterranean Weightlifting Confederation
- Olympic Committee of Serbia
- Sports Association of Serbia
