= Stevan K. Pavlowitch =

Yugoslav British historian (1933–2022)

Stevan Kosta Pavlowitch
- Born: 7 September 1933; Belgrade, Kingdom of Yugoslavia
- Died: 24 January 2022 (aged 88)
- Occupations: Professor, writer, journalist

Academic background
- Education: University of Paris
- Thesis: Anglo-Russian Rivalry in Serbia, 1837—1839 (1961)

Academic work
- Discipline: History
- Institutions: University of Southampton

Stevan Kosta Pavlowitch (Serbian: Stevan K. Pavlović, Стеван К. Павловић; 7 September 1933 – 24 January 2022) was a Yugoslav and British historian, emeritus professor of Balkan history at the University of Southampton, and a fellow of the Royal Historical Society.

== Biography ==
Stevan Kosta Pavlowitch was born in Belgrade, Kingdom of Yugoslavia on 7 September 1933, into a well-known Serbian family of diplomats from the Kingdom of Serbia and the Kingdom of Yugoslavia. His father Kosta St. Pavlović was a diplomat, who was personal secretary of Vojislav Marinković, the Yugoslav Foreign Minister; his grandfather, also named Stevan K. Pavlović, was an influential lawyer, interpreter and diplomat who had served with the Ministry of Foreign affairs, was a member of the Yugoslav delegation at the Paris Peace Conference in 1919–1920, and had received the Legion of Honour. His great-grandfather Kosta Pavlović was the first mayor of Niš and a member of the Liberal Party.

Pavlowitch began his schooling in Bucharest, where his father was stationed as a diplomat. Following the Axis invasion of Yugoslavia in 1941, the family followed the Yugoslav royal government to the United Kingdom where his father was appointed chief of the Cabinet of the Prime Ministers Dušan Simović, Slobodan Jovanović (Note: Jovanović was cousins with Pavlowitch's father. Jovanović and Pavlowitch's family remained friends in exile. When Jovanović died in December 1958, he was buried on the Pavlowitch family's burial plot in London.) and Miloš Trifunović then in 1943 First Secretary of the Yugoslav Embassy. After the war Pavlowitch's father completed postgraduate magisterial studies at the University of Cambridge, where he became, in 1961, a permanent member of the Faculty for Contemporary and Medieval Languages and a permanent member of the Regent House of the University of Cambridge.

Pavlowitch studied history in Paris at the Sorbonne University, in Lille and in London both at the School of Slavonic and East European Studies and King's College. From 1958 to 1965, Pavlowitch worked as a journalist and was stationed in Belgium and Italy. In 1965, he joined the staff of the University of Southampton and in 1997 became the emeritus professor of Balkan history, and was a fellow of the Royal Historical Society. He was the emeritus professor of Balkan history at the University of Southampton and a fellow of the Royal Historical Society. With his research on the history of Yugoslavia, rejection of essentialist, Balkanist or Orientalist as well as predetermined or simplistic nationalists interpretations of history, he became one of the most prominent and respected scholars in the field.

Pavlowitch was a contributor for the 1992 Radio Television of Serbia documentary series entitled Yugoslavia in War 1941–1945. He died on 24 January 2022, at the age of 88.

== Bibliography ==
- Anglo–Russian Rivalry in Serbia, 1837–1839: The Mission of Colonel Hodges. Paris: Mouton & Company. 1961.
- Yugoslavia. New York: Praeger. 1971.
- Bijou d'art: Histoires de la vie, de l'œuvre et du milieu de Bojidar Karageorgévitch, artiste parisien et prince balkanique (1862–1908). Lausanne: Éditions L'Âge d'Homme. 1978.
- The Albanian Problem in Yugoslavia: Two Views. London: Institute for the Study of Conflict. 1982. (with Elez Biberaj)
- Unconventional Perceptions of Yugoslavia 1940–1945. New York: Columbia University Press. 1985. ISBN 9780880330817.
- The Improbable Survivor: Yugoslavia and its Problems 1918–1988. Columbus: Ohio State University Press. 1988. ISBN 9780814204863.
- Tito: Yugoslavia's Great Dictator. Columbus: Ohio State University Press. 1992. ISBN 9780814206003.
- A History of the Balkans 1804–1945. London, New York: Longman. 1999. ISBN 9780582045859.
- History of the Balkans 1804-1945. Belgrade: Clio. 2001.
- Serbia: The History behind the Name. London: Hurst & Company. 2002. ISBN 9781850654773.
  - Republished in US as : Serbia: The History of an Idea. New York: New York University Press. 2002.
- Serbia: The history behind the name. Belgrade: Clio. 2004. ISBN 9785200000494.
- History of the Balkans 1804–1945 (2 ed.). Belgrade: Clio. 2004. ISBN 9788671021449.
- Hitler's New Disorder: The Second World War in Yugoslavia. New York: Columbia University Press. 2008. ISBN 9780231700504.
- Hitler's New Anti-Order: World War II in Yugoslavia. Belgrade: Clio. 2009. ISBN 9788671023610.
- Histories of the life, work and environment of Božidar Karađorđević, Parisian artist and Balkan prince (1862–1908). Belgrade: Clio. 2012. ISBN 9788671024204.
