= Vladimir Velebit =

Yugoslav politician, diplomat, military leader, and historian

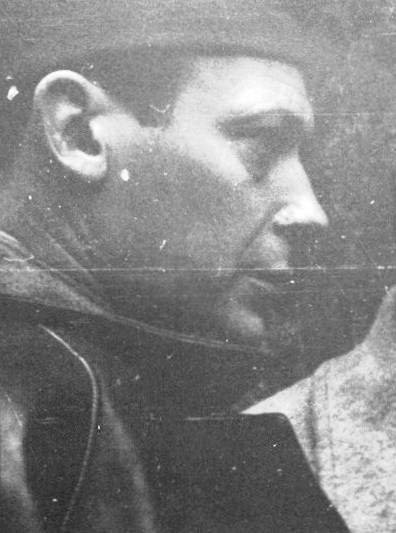
Velebit in 1943

Vladimir "Vlatko" Velebit, PhD (19 August 1907 – 29 August 2004) was a Yugoslav politician, diplomat and military leader who rose the rank of Major-General during World War II. A lawyer by profession, after the war he became a diplomat and historian.

Among his notable post-World War II appointments were the Yugoslav Ambassador to Rome as well as the Court of St. James's and World Bank. Additionally, he was Yugoslav Deputy Minister of Foreign Trade, and UNECE Executive Secretary from 1960 to 1967.

== Early life and education ==
Born in Zadar, Austria-Hungary to Serbian father Ljubomir Velebit and Slovenian-Croatian mother Olga Šeme, Vladimir's family had a long military tradition. His father Ljubomir was an officer in the Austro-Hungarian Army, fighting on the Russian front during World War I and later becoming brigadier-general in the Royal Yugoslav Army, while Vladimir's paternal grandfather Dušan Velebit was a general in the Austrian Army who married Elisabeth Marno von Eichenhorst, daughter of another Austrian general Adolf Marno von Eichenhorst. Even Vladimir's great grandfather Ilija Velebit was an officer in the Austrian army.

His male ancestors were Serbs originating from the village of Gornja Pastuša near Petrinja in the Banija region that was part of the Austrian-created Military Frontier. They were recruited into the Austrian army, eventually achieving high ranks.

Velebit began his formal education in Timișoara in German language. His family left the city just after the outbreak of World War I and went to Trieste while his father was off in Russia fighting for the Austro-Hungarians. Young Vladimir was soon moved again, this time to Vienna where he got enrolled in a private school that held classes in French language. Following the end of the war in 1918 and the final break-up of Austria-Hungary, the family moved to Zagreb which was now part of the newly created Kingdom of Serbs, Croats and Slovenes. At this point, 11-year-old Vladimir spoke very little Serbo-Croatian and had to study hard to be able to communicate in school. Due to his father's (who was now in the Royal Yugoslav Army) job, the family then moved to Čakovec and later to Varaždin, which is where Vladimir graduated high school in 1925.

He started studies at the University of Zagreb's Faculty of Law and then went to Paris for specialization, before returning to Zagreb to graduate in 1931. He earned his PhD two years later in 1933 from the same university.

== Legal career and communist activities on the side ==
After passing the lawyer's and judge's exams, Velebit began working as legal assistant at the District Court in Niš. Accused of having leftist political leanings during his student days he got transferred to Leskovac. Once there he hooked up with Communist Party (KPJ) members (a political party that was at the time an underground organization because of the ban on its activities in the Kingdom of Yugoslavia) and took part in starting the newspaper Leskovačke nedeljne novine that wasn't openly communist, but supported political opposition to the ruling coalition and by proxy to King Alexander I Karađorđević. Because of this Velebit got transferred again, this time to Priština where he was a judge in the County Court. The continual career demotion didn't deter Velebit from continuing with leftist activity; in Priština he started a readers' group that met clandestinely in his room to read Marxist literature and discuss politics. When authorities caught wind of this, the county sheriff ordered his room to be searched, but nothing incriminating was found. Velebit then became the chief of County Court in Kičevo, and later got transferred to Šid where he established contact with more KPJ members among whom was Herta Haas (at the time a student at Economics High School in Zagreb, later to become Josip Broz Tito's wife).

By 1937 Velebit had enough of being a judge, and moved to Zagreb where he established a law practice. Already deeply involved with the communists, in parallel with his legal practice he became a courier for the underground movement. Due to the nature of his job and a considerable network of professional connections, he was perfectly suitable for carrying messages to foreign countries. On one of those trips to Istanbul in 1939, 32-year-old Velebit met 47-year-old Josip Broz Tito who was KPJ's general secretary at the time. Being impressed with Velebit's guile, skills, and intelligence, Tito immediately offered him membership in the party. After becoming a full-fledged member Velebit began working as assistant to Josip Kopinič, Comintern's agent in Zagreb. In 1940 Velebit obtained and set up a radio station used to establish daily contact with Moscow - the station was never discovered and was functional throughout the war.

== World War II ==
Following April 1941 Nazi invasion and dismemberment of the Yugoslav Kingdom, Velebit stayed in Zagreb that became capital of the newly created Nazi client, Ustaše-run puppet state entity Independent State of Croatia (NDH). He operated as an underground collaborator of the KPJ-established People's Liberation Front. While working underground he used the alias name Vladimir Petrović, although due to being a well known and respected lawyer before the war he experienced no trouble with NDH authorities.

During March 1942 Velebit left Zagreb and joined the Partisans who mounted a guerrilla resistance to the Nazis and domestic collaborationists. Right away Tito included him in the army's Supreme Command where he mostly worked on establishing some sort of military court authority. Due to his education and knowledge of foreign languages, along with Koča Popović and Milovan Đilas, Velebit was part of the Partisan delegation in Gornji Vakuf and Zagreb at the controversial March 1943 German-Partisan negotiations while the Battle of Neretva raged several hundred kilometers to the south. Velebit and Đilas conducted the negotiations under pseudonyms Vladimir Petrović and Miloš Marković, respectively, while Koča Popović gave his real name.

In June 1943, Velebit became the point of contact for foreign military missions in their dealings with the Partisans. Following the death of Ivo Lola Ribar (member of Supreme Command and the chief of Partisan first military mission) on 27 November 1943, Velebit took over his duties. Following the Teheran Conference where the Allies agreed on backing the Partisan resistance exclusively over the Chetnik one, Velebit was sent to the Near East with lieutenant-colonel Miloje Milojević for negotiations over the details and scope of the support. After establishing first contact with the Allies in Cairo, he was on his way to London for further negotiations. Once there, Velebit had meetings with British envoys Fitzroy Maclean and William Deakin over the formal recognition of the People's Liberation Front as a new state entity. In May 1944 Velebit met with Winston Churchill and was also present in Caserta near Naples during Churchill's meeting with Tito on 12 August 1944.

== Post-war diplomatic career ==
Right after the end of World War II Velebit continued his diplomatic activity.

In the Democratic Federal Yugoslavia's provisionary government that got formed on the basis of British-brokered Treaty of Vis and later the Belgrade Agreement, he was the deputy to the Foreign Affairs Minister. He then became one of the chief members of the secret Yugoslav diplomatic mission to Washington, negotiating the terms and scope of the American help to Yugoslavia. After returning home to the country that was in the meantime re-constituted as a Stalinist communist state called Federal People's Republic of Yugoslavia, he became deputy to Foreign Affairs Minister Stanoje Simić. In that role, Velebit negotiated with the Allies during the Trieste Crisis.

In March 1948, after Soviet accusation that he was a British spy, Velebit was forced into resigning his post at the Yugoslav Foreign Affairs Ministry and got moved to the Tourist and Service Industry Committee. During the 1948 Cominform resolution and the fallout of subsequent Tito–Stalin split, Velebit was on more than one occasion cited by the Soviets as a spy who works for the British.

In 1951, Velebit became Yugoslav ambassador to Italy, while a year later he got the same job in the United Kingdom. During March 1953, he prepared Tito's first official state visit to a Western country. Tito thus became the first communist leader to visit the UK.

In 1960, on invitation from the United Nations secretary-general Dag Hammarskjöld, Velebit became executive secretary at the UN European Economic Commission (UNECE) in Geneva. He performed this job up until his retirement in 1967. Known in Western circles as a skilled diplomat, his last assignment was as an emissary of the Carnegie Foundation in the Israeli-Palestinian conflict.

In the early 1990s during the Yugoslav breakup and the beginning stages of the Yugoslav Wars, Velebit moved from London to Zagreb due to nationalist threats. Once back he divided his time between Zagreb and Mali Lošinj.

In 1992, Velebit was a contributor for the Radio Television of Serbia documentary series entitled Yugoslavia in War 1941–1945.

During retirement he wrote two books 1983's Sećanja (Memories) and 2002's Tajne i zamke Drugog svetskog rata (World War II's Secrets and Traps).

He died on 29 August 2004 at the Rebro clinical center in Zagreb. He was buried at the city's Mirogoj Cemetery on 3 September 2004.

Vladimir Velebit is mentioned in the 2009 book A Rat Hole to be Watched by American historian Coleman Armstrong Mehta as the point of contact between Frank Wisner (head of the Central Intelligence Agency's Directorate of Plans) and Yugoslav communist government during the early 1950s. Wisner apparently contacted Velebit because he was known to be the leading proponent of the idea that Yugoslav state should be oriented towards the West. According to Mehta's book that's based upon recently declassified American intelligence documents, the Wisner-Velebit contact, which occurred in the wake of Tito–Stalin split, eventually resulted in intelligence cooperation agreement between the United States and Federal People's Republic of Yugoslavia. The agreement enabled the Americans to get their hands on recently developed and deployed MiG-15 Soviet fighter plane, which was delivered to them by the Josip Broz Tito's Yugoslav government in 1951.

== Personal ==
Velebit married Vera Becić, a woman of Croatian ethnicity, the daughter of Croatian painter Vladimir Becić. They had two sons: Vladimir Jr. and Dušan.

== See also ==
- Socialist Federal Republic of Yugoslavia
- Yugoslav People's Army
- Titoism
- Communism
