= Brozović =

Brozović (Croatian pronunciation: [brǒːzoʋitɕ]) is a Croatian surname. Etymologically it is derived from the surname Broz, by means of possessive suffix -ov and a patronymic-forming suffix -ić.

It is among the most common surnames in the Karlovac County of Croatia.

Notable people with the surname include:

- Dalibor Brozović (1927–2009), Croatian linguist and Slavist
- Ilija Brozović (born 1991), Croatian handball player
- Marcelo Brozović (born 1992), Croatian footballer
- Milica Brozović (born 1983), Russian-Slovak pair skater
- Miroslav Brozović (1917–2006), Bosnian Croat footballer
