= Enver Redžić =

Bosnian historian (1915–2009)

Enver Redžić Енвер Реџић
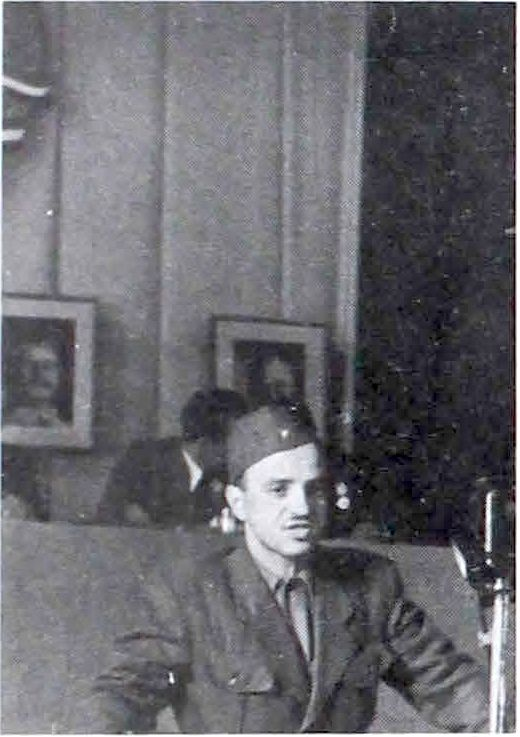
- Born: 4 May 1915; Sanski Most, Austro-Hungarian Empire
- Died: 4 November 2009 (aged 94); Sarajevo, Bosnia and Herzegovina
- Education: University of Sarajevo
- Occupation: Historian

Enver Redžić (Serbian Cyrillic: Енвер Реџић; 4 May 1915 – 4 November 2009) was a Bosnian historian, cultural observer, professor, and founder of the publishing company Svjetlost. During World War II, he was a member of anti-fascist groups ZAVNOBiH and AVNOJ.

== Early life and education ==
Redžić, born to Bosnian Muslim parents in the village Stari Majdan by the Bosnian city Sanski Most, identified as an ethnic Serb. He attended elementary and secondary school in Bihać. He studied Yugoslav literature and history at the Philosophical Faculty in Sarajevo and graduated in 1940.

== World War II ==
When World War II broke out in Yugoslavia in 1941, Redžić was in his 20s. He actively participated in NOB from 1941–45 and was also a councilor on the State Anti-fascist Council for the National Liberation of Bosnia and Herzegovina and the Anti-Fascist Council for the National Liberation of Yugoslavia. He was secretary and vice president of the District People's Liberation Committee over from 1944 to 1945 in Bihać.

== Later life ==
Redžić worked as an assistant professor in social science at the Philosophy Faculty in Sarajevo University in the 1950s. He was director of his publishing company Svjetlost from 1952 to 1959, and also director of the Institute for the History of the labor movement between 1960 and 1971. He retired in 1972, after which he was elected to the Academy of Sciences and Arts of Bosnia and Herzegovina, first by correspondence in 1978, and then as a full member from 1984.

Enver Redžić received many awards for his social, cultural and scientific research. The holder of the Partisan Memorial (Partizanske Spomenice) in 1941, the Medal for Bravery, the Order of Brotherhood and Unity (II Order), the Order of Merit for the People (II Order), the Order of the Red Flag, the Order of the Republic with golden wreath. His publishing company Svjetlost also won awards in the 1980s.

Redžić was a contributor for the Radio Television of Belgrade documentary series entitled Yugoslavia in War 1941-1945.

His two sons, Fadil and Zoran Redžić were prominent rock musicians, playing bass guitar in two of the best known Bosnian rock bands, Indeksi and Bijelo Dugme, respectively.

He died in November 2009 at the age of 94.

== Bibliography ==
- Prilozi o nacionalnom pitanju (1963)
- Tokovi i otpori (1970)
- Austromarksizam i jugoslovensko pitanje (1977)
- Jugoslovenska misao i socijalizam (1982)
- Jugoslavenski radnički pokret i nacionalno pitanje u Bosni i Hercegovini (1918–1941) (1983)
- Muslimansko autonomaštvo i 13. SS divizija – autonomija BiH i Hitlerov Treći Rajh' (1987)
- Istorijski pogledi na vjerske i nacionalne odnose u BiH (1993)
- Bosna i Hercegovina u Drugom svjetskom ratu (1998)
- Sto godina muslimanske politike (2000)
- Pogledi iz antiistorije (2001)
- Akademici i istoričari: Anto Babić (2001)
- Pola stoljeća ANUBiH (2004)
- Bosnia and Herzegovina in the Second World War (2005)

== Sources ==
- Banac, Ivo (1992). Protiv straha: članci, izjave i javni nastupi [Against fear: articles, statements and public appearances] (in Croatian). Zagreb: Slon.
