= Yugoslav Olympic Committee =

Former National Olympic Committee

- Country: Yugoslavia
- Code: YUG
- Created: 14 December 1919 (as JOO); 5 August 1947 (as JOK)
- Recognized: 1920
- Continental Association: EOC
- Dissolved: 3 April 2003
- Headquarters: Zagreb (1919–1927); Belgrade (1927–1931); Zagreb (1931–1941); Belgrade (1947–2003)

The Yugoslav Olympic Committee (Croatian: Jugoslavenski olimpijski komitet; Serbian: Југословенски олимпијски комитет / Jugoslovenski olimpijski komitet; Slovene: Jugoslovanski оlimpijski кomite; Macedonian: Југословенски олимписки комитет, romanized: Jugoslovenski olimpiski komitet; also known by the acronym JOK) was the non-profit organization representing Yugoslav athletes in the International Olympic Committee.

Throughout its existence JOK was the country's authority in charge of organizing the sending of Yugoslavia's teams to the Summer and Winter Olympic Games, as well as organizing the hosting of large international sporting events in the country.

== History ==
The Yugoslav Olympic Committee (country code YUG) was the governing body responsible for organizing delegations to Olympic Games during three distinct periods in the history of the country, from the 1920s until the 2000s:

=== Kingdom of Yugoslavia (1920 S – 1936 S) ===
Kingdom of Yugoslavia at the Olympics (1920–1936)
Edition	Athletes	Medals
1920 (S)	15	—
1924 (W)	4	—
1924 (S)	37	2
1928 (W)	6	—
1928 (S)	34	5
1932 (W)	DNP	
1932 (S)	1	—
1936 (W)	17	—
1936 (S)	93	1

The organization was originally established in Zagreb in December 1919 as Jugoslavenski olimpijski odbor (JOO), intended to represent athletes from the newly established Kingdom of Yugoslavia (officially styled as "Kingdom of Serbs, Croats and Slovenes" from 1918 to 1929).

In 1920 it was recognized by the IOC as a successor to the pre-war Olympic Committee of Serbia (Olimpijski komitet Serbije, OKS) which had been accepted by the IOC in June 1912 as representative of the Kingdom of Serbia, and which had previously competed in the Olympics once, at the 1912 Summer Olympics in Stockholm. (Before World War I Slavic athletes from areas in modern-day Slovenia, Croatia, Bosnia and Herzegovina and Vojvodina, which had all been part of Austria-Hungary at the time, competed as part of Austrian or Hungarian teams in the Olympics held between 1896 and 1912.)

In 1927 the organization was briefly moved to capital Belgrade, when it changed its name to Jugoslovenski olimpijski komitet (JOK), only to relocate back to Zagreb in 1931.

During this period Yugoslav athletes competed in five Summer Olympics (1920, 1924, 1928, 1932, 1936) and three Winter Olympics (1924, 1928, 1936), missing only the 1932 Winter Olympics at Lake Placid. Following the May 1938 cancellation of the planned 1940 Games in Japan and the outbreak of World War II in Europe in 1939 JOK's activities were put on hiatus. In April 1941 Yugoslavia was invaded, and soon after that the newly installed authorities of the Nazi-allied NDH regime in Zagreb officially dissolved and banned the organization.

In its first appearance in 1920 Yugoslavia sent only the men's football team, who suffered a humiliating 0–7 defeat to Czechoslovakia in their only match of the tournament. Yugoslavia's first medalist was the gymnast Leon Štukelj four years later in Paris, who won two golds, in men's all-round competition and in horizontal bars events. Štukelj also competed in the 1928 edition in Amsterdam and the 1936 Olympics in Berlin, winning one more gold, two bronzes, and one silver.

His silver in Berlin, in the rings event, was the last medal won by any athlete for the Kingdom of Yugoslavia—and with a career total of six medals, including three golds, he remains the most decorated Yugoslav Olympian of all times.

Between 1920 and 1936 Yugoslav athletes won a total of eight Olympic medals, including three golds. The country's last flagbearer in this period was hammer thrower Milan Stepišnik, at the 1936 Summer Olympics opening ceremony in Berlin. He led Yugoslavia's largest team to date, which included 93 athletes in 13 sports.

=== SFR Yugoslavia (1948 W – 1992 W) ===
After World War II, the new communist authorities of SFR Yugoslavia re-established the organization as JOK in August 1947, this time permanently headquartered in capital Belgrade, in order to send athletes to the first post-war Games, the January–February 1948 Winter Olympics in St. Moritz and the July–August 1948 Summer Olympics in London.

The first post-war Olympians from Yugoslavia were therefore a delegation of 17 athletes at the St. Moritz Olympics (all of them Slovene), and a 90-strong team (79 men and 11 women) who competed in London in eight sports. Yugoslavia won two silver medals, in the men's football tournament, and men's hammer throw.

Athletes representing SFR Yugoslavia went on to compete in 11 Summer Olympics between 1948 and 1988, and 11 Winter Olympics between 1948 and 1992. Yugoslavia also hosted the 1984 Winter Olympics in Sarajevo, with alpine skier Jure Franko becoming the only Yugoslav athlete in history to win a medal on home soil, a silver in the men's giant slalom race held at Bjelašnica.

The first post-war flag bearer was water polo player Božo Grkinić, and the first gold medalists of this era were men's rowers in the coxless four event at the 1952 Olympics in Helsinki, all members of VK Gusar from Split. The first gold in any team sports was won by the men's national football team at the 1960 Olympics in Rome, and the first Yugoslav woman to win an Olympic gold was the swimmer Đurđica Bjedov at the 1968 Olympics in Mexico City, who later became the only Yugoslav inducted into the International Swimming Hall of Fame.

Slovenia's Mateja Svet was the last ever Winter Olympic medalist for SFR Yugoslavia, winning silver in women's slalom on 26 February 1988 in Nakiska, a resort west of Calgary, behind Switzerland's Vreni Schneider. The country's last Summer Olympics medalists were the men's national water polo team who won gold on 1 October 1988 in Seoul, beating the United States 9–7 in the final of the tournament.

In the era between 1948 and 1988 Yugoslav Olympians won a total of 75 medals, including 23 golds. Their best result was at the 1984 Summer Olympics in Los Angeles, which was boycotted by the Warsaw Pact countries in retaliation for the West's boycott of the 1980 Summer Olympics in Moscow. As a staunchly non-aligned country Yugoslavia competed in both editions, and in Los Angeles the team won 18 medals, including seven golds, ending up 9th in the medal table, the only time the nation was ranked among the top 10 Olympic performers.

The largest team Yugoslavia ever sent was for the 1980 Moscow Olympics, which had 164 competitors (135 men and 28 women). Other notable achievements of Yugoslav Olympians in this era were in wrestling (16 medals, including four golds) and boxing (11 medals, including three golds). In team sports, between 1968 and 1988 men's and women's national basketball teams won seven medals, and in the same period Yugoslavia's Olympic water polo team also won seven, including four golds.

The very last flagbearer for Yugoslavia before the country began falling apart was the celebrated canoeist Matija Ljubek, at the 1988 opening ceremony in Seoul.

=== FR Yugoslavia (1996 S – 2002 W) ===
In 1991 the violent dissolution of Yugoslavia began, and by late 1991 SR Slovenia and SR Croatia had declared independence from Yugoslavia, forming their own National Olympic Committees. Slovenia's NOC was officially recognized by the IOC in January 1992, and Croatia's was provisionally accepted in January 1992, with full membership granted in September 1993. They both sent teams to the 1992 Winter Olympics in Albertville and the subsequent 1992 Summer Olympics in Barcelona.

Meanwhile, the Yugoslav Olympic Committee, now representing the "rump" of SFR Yugoslavia, also sent a team to the 1992 Winter Olympics. This proved to be the last appearance for the team under that name and flag. By that time SR Macedonia had also declared independence from Yugoslavia (but was not yet recognized by the IOC) and in March 1992 SR Bosnia and Herzegovina followed, leaving only SR Serbia and SR Montenegro carrying the Yugoslav name.

In April 1992, two months after the Albertville Olympics, Serbia and Montenegro reformed into the new Federal Republic of Yugoslavia, with its Olympic Committee in Belgrade claiming legacy and historical records of previous Yugoslav teams. In May 1992 the country was also hit by UN sanctions which banned it from taking part in international sporting events, so its athletes slated to compete in the upcoming 1992 Summer Olympics in July were billed as part of the Independent Olympic Participants team (IOP), rather than representatives of Yugoslavia (along with athletes from Macedonia, whose NOC was recognized only after the Games, in 1993). The ban lasted until 1995, meaning that FR Yugoslavia was also banned from competing at the 1994 Winter Olympics in Lillehammer.

FR Yugoslavia and its Yugoslav Olympic Committee returned for the 1996 Summer Olympics in Atlanta. Under that name, they competed in two Summer Olympics and two Winter Olympics, with their last appearance at the 2002 Winter Olympics in Salt Lake City.

Between 1996 and 2002 athletes competing for FR Yugoslavia won seven Olympic medals, including two golds. The last medalists in this era were the men's volleyball team who won gold at the 2000 Olympics, beating Russia in the final, and the last flagbearer was volleyball player Vladimir Grbić, at the opening ceremony of the same Games held in Sydney.

In early 2003 FR Yugoslavia was officially renamed Serbia and Montenegro, and, conversely, on 3 April 2003 the Belgrade-based Yugoslav Olympic Committee was renamed Olympic Committee of Serbia and Montenegro (OKSCG), marking a historic end to the name under which athletes had been competing for more than 80 years.

=== Later developments ===
As "Serbia and Montenegro" (designated new team code SCG) the team competed in the 2004 Summer Olympics in Athens, and the 2006 Winter Olympics in Turin. Although the Belgrade-based NOC's claim of continuity was eventually recognized by the IOC, in some sources the entire period from 1996 to 2006 is retroactively attributed to Serbia and Montenegro, while others conflate the entire 1920–2002 period under "Yugoslavia".

In June 2006 Montenegro declared independence, peacefully broke away and formed its own NOC in Podgorica. Serbia once again became an independent country at the Olympics (country code SRB) and renamed its national committee in Belgrade Olympic Committee of Serbia (OKS), the same name it had before 1919. The modern-day OKS claims unbroken lineage from 1912 to the present day.

Serbia and Montenegro competed as separate nations for the first time in the 2008 Summer Olympics in Beijing.

Meanwhile, the 1998–99 Kosovo War later led to Kosovo's declaration of independence in February 2008. Although recognized by many countries, the declaration is disputed by Serbia which regards Kosovo as its southern province. Nevertheless, in December 2014 the IOC recognized the Olympic Committee of Kosovo (KOK), with the first Kosovar team appearing at the 2016 Olympics in Rio de Janeiro.

== Events hosted ==
The JOK was also tasked with organizing Yugoslavia's bidding for hosting of major multi-sport events in Yugoslavia, and was involved with planning and rating large sports development projects and infrastructure needed for them. These included the following:

- Successful bid to host the 1979 Mediterranean Games in Split; Bid prepared and submitted in 1975.
- Successful bid to host the 1984 Winter Olympics in Sarajevo; At the 80th IOC session in May 1978 Sarajevo won the second round of voting, beating Sapporo (1972 host) and Gothenburg.
- Failed bid to host the 1992 Summer Olympics in Belgrade; At the 91st IOC session in October 1986 Belgrade finished fourth in the third round of voting, behind Barcelona (1992 host), Paris (1900, 1924, 2024) and Brisbane (2032), ahead of Birmingham and Amsterdam (1928).
- Failed bid to host the 1996 Summer Olympics in Belgrade; At the 96th IOC session in September 1990 Belgrade finished sixth in the first round of voting, behind Atlanta (1996), Athens (2004), Toronto, Melbourne (1956) and Manchester.

== Administrators ==
=== Presidents ===
- 1919–1927: Franjo Bučar
- 1927–1931: Gen. Dušan Stefanović
- 1931–1941: Stevan Hadži
- 1948–1950: Stanko Bloudek
- 1950–1951: Gen. Dušan Korać
- 1951–1952: Gustav Vlahov
- 1952–1960: Boris Bakrač
- 1960–1964: Milijan Neoričić
- 1964–1973: Zoran Polič
- 1973–1977: Gojko Sekulovski
- 1977–1981: Đorđe Peklić
- 1981–1982: Slobodan Filipović
- 1982–1983: Azem Vllasi
- 1983–1986: Zdravko Mutin
- 1986–1989: Ivan Mecanović
- 1989–1996: Aleksandar Bakočević
- 1996–2003: Dragan Kićanović

=== Secretaries-general ===
- 1949–1965: Branko Polič
- 1965–1973: Nebojša Popović
- 1973–1978: Marijan Kraljević
- 1978–1993: Časlav Veljić
- 1993–2000: Đorđe Perišić
- 2000–2003: Predrag Manojlović

== Successors ==
- Slovenian Olympic Committee (OKS) (est. 1991, recognized in 1992)
- Croatian Olympic Committee (HOK) (est. 1991, recognized in 1993)
- Olympic Committee of Bosnia and Herzegovina (OKBiH) (est. 1992, recognized in 1993)
- Olympic Committee of North Macedonia (MOK) (est. 1992, recognized in 1993)
- Olympic Committee of Serbia and Montenegro (OKSCG) (1992–2006)
  - Montenegrin Olympic Committee (COK) (est. 2006, recognized in 2007)
  - Olympic Committee of Serbia (OKS) (1910–1918; re-est. 2006)
- Olympic Committee of Kosovo (KOK) (est. 1992, recognized in 2014)

== See also ==
- Yugoslavia at the Olympics
- List of Olympic medalists for Yugoslavia
