= Podgor, Montenegro =

Podgor Подгор
- Village
- Country: Montenegro
- Municipality: Bar Municipality
- Time zone: UTC+1 (CET)
  - Summer (DST): UTC+2 (CEST)

Podgor (Montenegrin Cyrillic: Подгор) is a village in the Crmnica region of Montenegro. It is best known as the birthplace of the celebrated Yugoslav communist politician Svetozar Vukmanović-Tempo, who was born there in 1912.

== Notable residents ==
- Svetozar Vukmanović
