= Svetozar Vukmanović =

Montenegrin communist politician

- Светозар Вукмановић
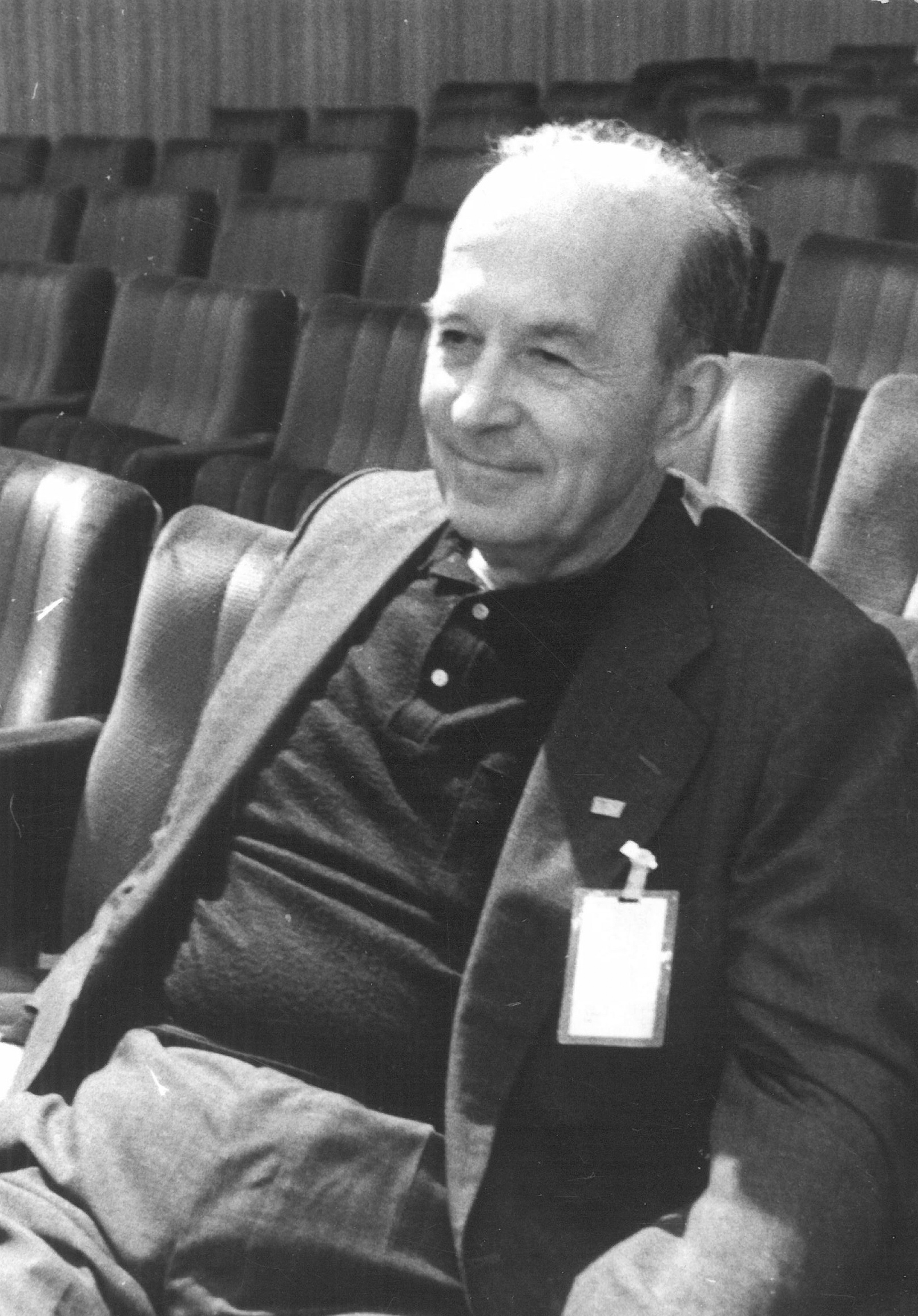

Personal details
- Born: Svetozar Vukmanović; 3 August 1912 Podgor, Montenegro
- Died: 6 December 2000 (aged 88) Reževići, Montenegro, FR Yugoslavia
- Party: Communist Party of Yugoslavia

Military service
- Allegiance: Yugoslav Partisans
- Battles/wars: Uprising in Montenegro

Svetozar Vukmanović - Tempo (Serbo-Croatian Cyrillic: Светозар Вукмановић - Темпо; 3 August 1912 – 6 December 2000) was a leading Montenegrin communist and member of the Central Committee of the League of Communists of Yugoslavia. During World War II he served on the Supreme Staff, went on missions to Bulgaria, Greece, and Albania, and became Josip Broz Tito's personal representative in the Socialist Republic of Macedonia. He held high positions in the postwar government, and was proclaimed a People's Hero of Yugoslavia.

== Early life ==
Born to Nikola Vukmanović and Marija Pejović in the village of Podgor in Crmnica, young Svetozar grew up with three siblings: older brothers Đuro and Luka and sister Milica. In search of work, their father Nikola went over to North America where he made a living by doing manual labour in mines, but eventually returned to Montenegro. After World War I, he was an opponent of the matter of the unification of Serbia and Montenegro and held pro-Zelenaši views following the Podgorica Assembly. For this he was arrested by the royal Yugoslav regime, spending two years in prison during the early 1920s.

Svetozar completed primary school in his village with excellent grades, before going to Cetinje, like his brothers previously, for gymnasium studies. He did this against the wishes of his father who wanted at least one male to stay with the family at the village. His first exposure to communist ideas occurred in 1927 when his oldest brother Đuro (who studied philosophy in Paris where he became a member of the French Communist Party (PCF) and even spent time in prison in Italy over communist activity) came back to the village in poor health and soon died. Impressed with what he heard, young Svetozar became a communist and along with his first cousin Branko Vukmanović started reading Marxist and Soviet literature.

After graduating from the Gymnasium in 1931, he moved to Belgrade with his first cousin to study at the University of Belgrade's Law School.

== Student days ==
Although a communist for a few years already, Svetozar was not a member of the Communist Party (KPJ) in the Kingdom of Yugoslavia, mostly because its organization in Montenegro was still weak with sporadic activity. Immediately upon arriving to Belgrade, however, he took an active part in the revolutionary student movement that was strong at the university. Right away, he participated in the large demonstrations during November 1931 for which he got kicked out of the dormitory the following year. He was thus forced to pay rent in various private apartments and for a time even lived with another communist activist Đuro Strugar, who was his friend from Cetinje gymnasium. In 1933, Svetozar formally joined the Party along with his gymnasium friends Novica Ulićević, Dimitrije Živanović, Ratomir Popović, Branko Mašanović, and Đuro Strugar.

As a student in 1933, he organized strikes and demonstrations. He graduated from the University of Belgrade's Law School in 1935.

He was nicknamed Tempo because of his urging people to hurry.

After publishing his memoirs in the 1980s, Tempo came back into the public spotlight by providing vocals for the rock band Bijelo dugme on their 1986 album Pljuni i zapjevaj moja Jugoslavijo.

Tempo died in late 2000 in his seacoast villa in Reževići. Before his death, he explicitly requested to be buried next to his brother Luka in their home village Podgora.

== Execution of his brother Luka ==
Svetozar Vukmanović's own brother Luka Vukmanović was a Serbian Orthodox Church priest in Montenegro. He was executed by Yugoslav Partisans in May 1945, after being captured and tortured along with Metropolitan Joanikije. In fact Svetozar, as a loyal communist, did nothing to save the life of his brother.

The details of his capture, torture, and subsequent execution remain somewhat unclear, along with the role of his brother Tempo in the said events.

In mid-1945 priest Luka Vukmanović was escaping Montenegro along with clergy of the Serbian Orthodox Church's Metropolitanate of Montenegro-Littoral in a mass exodus towards Slovenia and Austria. Also in the mass convoy were various members of the Podgorica Assembly who voted to unite Montenegro with Serbia in 1918 and who now feared reprisals in increasingly chaotic situation in Montenegro, as well as royal government ministers and a number of other royalists and chetniks who bitterly opposed communism and many of whom had collaborated with the occupying forces of the Axis. In particular, the most prominent member of the clergy in the exodus, Metropolitan Joanikije, had collaborated with the occupying Italian and German forces and supported the activities of the Serbian Chetniks. They were all on the run since November 1944. Luka's 14-year-old son Čedomir was also within the convoy.

The convoy was intercepted by troops commanded by communist general from Montenegro Peko Dapčević (incidentally, also from a clerical family as his father Jovan Dapčević was a deacon). According to some accounts, this happened near Zidani Most in Slovenia, and according to others it took place in Austria. Wherever it was, most of the people in the convoy were executed on the spot and buried in various unmarked graves.

This is when Tempo was reportedly informed about Luka's capture and asked to decide on what should happen to his brother. His reported answer was: "The same as what happens to others". Luka's young son Čedomir, who managed to survive the bloody ordeal was later effectively raised by his uncle Tempo who took care of his nephew's living arrangements and education in Belgrade.

Before the mass executions began, Metropolitan Joanikije, as the most prominent member of the clergy was separated from the group and transported to Aranđelovac vicinity in Serbia where he was imprisoned, and eventually executed.

In 1971, Tempo wrote a book entitled Revolucija koja teče (An Ongoing Revolution) in which he wrote the following about his brother: "I didn't want to talk to my mother about Luka. She didn't dare mention him in front of me. She once tried to say that he wasn't with the occupiers, but I interrupted her sternly and told her not to mention him anymore in my presence if she wants to see me in her house ever again. She never mentioned him again."

Since then, towards the end of his life, and especially after the collapse of communism, Tempo defended himself in some interviews by saying he was never informed about his brother's capture.

Luka's son Čedomir Vukmanović said he believes that his uncle Tempo found out about what happened to Luka few days after he was executed. In June 2005, as he was getting ready to go to Slovenia to commemorate 60 years since the mass execution, Čedomir Vukmanović gave an interview for Belgrade daily Blic and said the following: "It's untrue that my uncle gave an order for my father to be executed. I've had hundreds of conversations with my uncle on that very subject. Nobody informed him, nor consulted him. Nor did he know that my father was going to be killed. Before his death in 2000, Tempo was very motivated to find out who gave the order to have those 18,000 people executed. He came upon shocking findings - the order was given by some of his closest comrades".

== See also ==
- Socialist Federal Republic of Yugoslavia
- Titoism
- Vukmanović was a contributor for the 1992 Radio Television of Serbia documentary series entitled Yugoslavia in War 1941–1945.
