= Svetomir Đukić =

Serbian general and sports administrator

Đukić standing, third, in a photo with the officers of the 2nd Battalion of 9th Infantry Regiment of 1st Call.

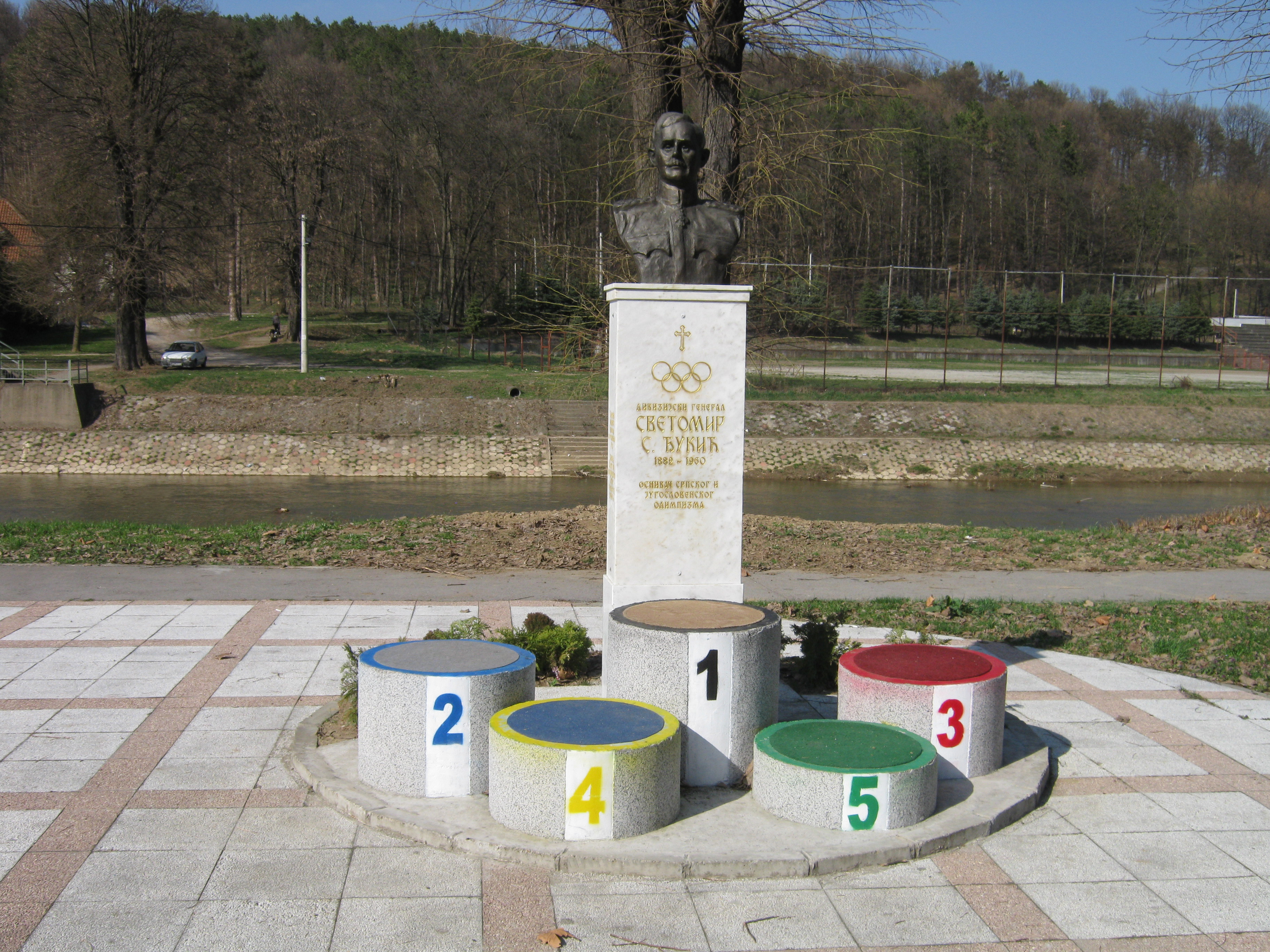
The Monument of Svetomir Đukić, the founder of Olympic Committee of Serbia in Valjevo

Svetomir Đukić (29 May 1882 – 19 October 1960) was the founder of the Olympic Committee of Serbia, an officer in the Serbian Army and a general in the Chetnik movement.

== Biography ==
Đukić was born in 1882 in the Principality of Serbia.

In mid-April 1945 he met with Draža Mihailović who instructed him to meet with the leader of the Independent State of Croatia, Ante Pavelić. He was to seek passage through Croatian territory, as well as supplies. He arrived in Zagreb on April 17.

He led a Chetnik delegation which carried on talks with Croatian officials. These talks were held on solely between the respective Croat and Serb delegations, without the involvement of Nazi Germany. On the first day, and Vladimir Predavac had a meeting with Pavelić and Andrija Artuković. On the second day of talks Đukić was joined by Žika Andrić and a representative of Mihailović, Ranko Brašić while Artuković's place was taken by generals Djordje Gruić and Maks Luburić.

After the last meeting, held on April 22, Pavelić agreed to Đukić's requests. Pavelić later confirmed the meeting in his work Hrvatska država živi (1949).

His memoirs Iz šume u emigraciju - Dražine poruke Paveliću (1955) were printed in Buenos Aires. He died in 1960.
