= Saša Broz =

Croatian theatre and television director

- Born: Aleksandra Broz; 19 October 1968 (age 57); Zagreb, SR Croatia, SFR Yugoslavia
- Occupations: Theatre and television director
- Spouse: Ranko Zidarić (m. 1994; div. 2000)
- Children: 1
- Relatives: Mišo Broz (father); Josip Broz Tito (grandfather)

Aleksandra "Saša" Broz (born 19 October 1968) is a Croatian theatre and television director. She has worked for several theatres in Croatia and one in Bosnia and Herzegovina.

== Family and education ==
Saša Broz is the daughter of diplomat Mišo Broz and granddaughter of the Yugoslav president Josip Broz Tito and Herta Haas. She was born and educated in Zagreb. She became interested in classical ballet in early childhood, which her parents discouraged. With the support of her grandfather Tito, who was close to her and involved in her upbringing, she nevertheless enrolled into a ballet school.

Broz received graduate and postgraduate degrees from the Moscow State Academy of Choreography, but a foot injury ended her ballet career, and she returned to Croatia. She took up studying theatre directing at the Academy of Dramatic Art, University of Zagreb, and started her career as a director already in her second year of studies.

== Career ==
Broz has worked for a number of theatres in Zagreb, including the Croatian National Theatre and Gavella Drama Theatre, as well as in Velika Gorica. She has also worked outside Croatia, most notably for the Tuzla National Theatre in Bosnia and Herzegovina. During her two-year-long tenure as intendant of the Istria National Theatre in Pula, the theatre received awards at festivals in Italy and Montenegro. The city authorities terminated her position in 2006. Broz sued them, claiming that their decision was politically motivated. She also directed the 50th Pula Film Festival. Croatian Radiotelevision has employed her as the director of synchronization for animated films. The 2013 decision to name Broz director of opera at the Croatian National Theatre Ivan pl. Zajc in Rijeka was criticized by some cultural workers, including Darko Lukić and Slobodan Šnajder, who stated that she had no training or experience in opera directing.

== Personal life ==
Saša Broz was married to actor Ranko Zidarić from 1994 until their divorce in 2000. They have a daughter. In 2006, Saša and Mišo Broz trademarked the name and signatures of Josip Broz Tito; Saša said the intent was to preserve her grandfather's dignity.
