= Walter Roberts (writer) =

American writer

Walter R. Roberts
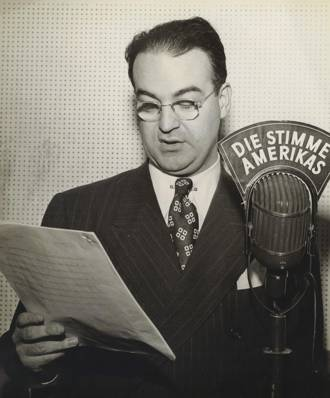
- Walter R. Roberts at the Voice of America (VOA) microphone
- Born: August 26, 1916; Austria-Hungary
- Died: June 29, 2014 (aged 98); Washington, DC
- Education: University of Vienna; Cambridge University (M.Litt., Ph.D.)
- Occupations: government official, author
- Known for: work at Voice of America

Walter R. Roberts (August 26, 1916 – June 29, 2014) was an American writer, lecturer, and former government official.

== Life and career ==
Walter R Roberts was born in Austria, and was educated at the University of Vienna and Cambridge University (M.Litt., Ph.D.).

He was a research assistant at The Harvard Law School (1940–1942) and joined the US Government (Coordinator of Information) in 1942. After eight years of service with the Voice of America, he was transferred to the Austrian Desk of the Department of State (1950).

In 1953, he was appointed Deputy Area Director for Europe in the newly created U.S. Information Agency (USIA). In 1955, he was a member of the American Delegation to the Austrian Treaty Talks that culminated in a State Treaty, signed in Vienna by the four occupying powers (U.S. Great Britain, France and the Soviet Union) on May 15, 1955.

In 1960, he was appointed Counselor for Public Affairs at the American Embassy in Belgrade, Yugoslavia. In 1966, he was assigned as Diplomat in Residence at Brown University in Providence, R.I. and in 1967 he was transferred to Geneva, Switzerland to serve as Counselor for Public Affairs at the U.S. Mission to the United Nations. In 1969, he was appointed Deputy Associate Director of USIA and in 1971 was elevated to the associate director position, then the senior career post in USIA.

In 1973, his book Tito, Mihailović and the Allies, 1941–1945 was published, described by Foreign Affairs as "the best book on the subject." In 1974, he received the Distinguished Honor Award from USIA. He retired from the U.S. Government in 1974 to take the position of Director of Diplomatic Studies at Georgetown University's Center for Strategic and International Studies (CSIS). His first assignment there was to serve as executive director of a panel on International Information, Educational and Cultural Affairs (also called the Stanton Panel after its chairman, the then President of CBS, Dr. Frank Stanton).

In 1975, he was called back into government to serve as executive director of the Board for International Broadcasting. (BIB, the government agency overseeing Radio Free Europe and Radio Liberty. The BIB was dissolved and replaced in 1999 by the Broadcasting Board of Governors. In 1985, he retired for the second time from the U.S. Government and was appointed diplomat-in-residence at The George Washington University where he taught a course on "Diplomacy in the Information Age" for ten years.

In 1991, President George H. W. Bush appointed him to be a member of the U.S. Advisory Commission on Public Diplomacy and President Bill Clinton reappointed him in 1994. In 1993, he accepted an appointment as a member of the board of the Salzburg Global Seminar. In 2001, he co-founded (as a successor to the Public Diplomacy Foundation) The Institute for Public Diplomacy and Global Communication and the Public Diplomacy Council. He was later an advisor to the (renamed) Institute for Public Diplomacy and Global Communication and was a member emeritus of the board of the Public Diplomacy Council.

In 2009, he received the Voice of America "Director's Special Recognition Award".

In 2014, his book "Tito, Mihailović and the Allies, 1941 – 1945" was republished in Serbia. After his personal recollections about Josip Broz Tito were published by American Diplomacy, the Serbian newspaper Politika covered the story on its front page.

After his retirement from government, he wrote and spoke widely on foreign affairs subjects.

He died in 2014 in Washington D.C.

== Books ==
- Tito, Mihailović and the Allies,1941–1945, Rutgers University Press, 1973; reprinted by Duke University Press, 1987
- Culture and Information: Two Foreign Policy Functions (with Terry L. Deibel), Sage Publications, 1976.

== Articles ==
- "U.S. Experience in Evaluating Information Programs", Zeitschrift für Kulturaustausch, Stuttgart, 1975
- "The Global Information Revolution and the Communist World" (with Harold E. Engle), The Washington Quarterly, Spring, 1986
- "The Information Revolution: A Breakthrough in the East?" The World Today (The Royal Institute of International Affairs), June 1989. Published in German by the Europaische Rundschau in the Fall of 1989.
- "A New Status for Eastern Europe?", The World Today (The Royal Institute of International Affairs), October, 1989
- "Germany: The Gorbachev Memorandum", The World Today (The Royal Institute of International Affairs), October, 1990
- "Diplomacy in the Information Age", The World Today (The Royal Institute of International Affairs), July, 1991. Published in German by the Europaische Rundschau in the Fall of 1991.
- "The Life and Death of Integration in Yugoslavia", Mediterranean Quarterly, Spring, 1992
- "Torn Curtain" (with Harold E.Engle), Foreign Service Journal June, 1993
- "The Voices of America", World & I, November, 1993
- "Eberhard P. Deutsch: A Comment" Austrian Information (Washington, D.C.) Vol.49, No. 11, 1996
- "Austria as a Model", Foreign Policy, Fall, 1996
- "Follow the Austrian Model", Washington Quarterly, Winter, 1997
- "The Only Good Serb is a..." (With David Binder), Mediterranean Quarterly, Summer, 1998
- "Serbs as Victims", The Washington Post, April 10, 1999
- "Government Broadcasting", Virtual Diplomacy (Net diplomacy-Beyond Old Borders) U.S. Institute of Peace, August, 2002
- "Rebuilding Public Diplomacy" (with Barry Fulton), National Strategy Forum Review, Spring, 2004
- "The Evolution of Diplomacy" Mediterranean Quarterly, Summer, 2006
- "What is Public Diplomacy? Past Practices, Present Conduct, Possible Future", Mediterranean Quarterly, Fall, 2007
- "Rebooting America's Image Abroad", WhirledView, February 14, 2009
- "The Voice of America – Origins and Recollections", American Diplomacy, Oct.26, 2009
- "The Voice of America – Origins and Recollections II", American Diplomacy, Jan.11, 2011
- "The Israel Palestine Conflict: 1967 Lines with Mutually Agreed Swaps", American Diplomacy, Sept.21, 2011
- "The Day Austria Disappeared from the Map", American Diplomacy, February 2012
- "Years of Self-Inflicted Disasters – Austria Before Annexation in 1938", American Diplomacy, May 2012
- "Austria Redux – How Austria Reappeared on the Map of Europe", American Diplomacy, September 2013
- "Tito – Personal Reflections", American Diplomacy, February 2014
