= Aleksandar Bakočević =

Serbian politician

- Александар Бакочевић
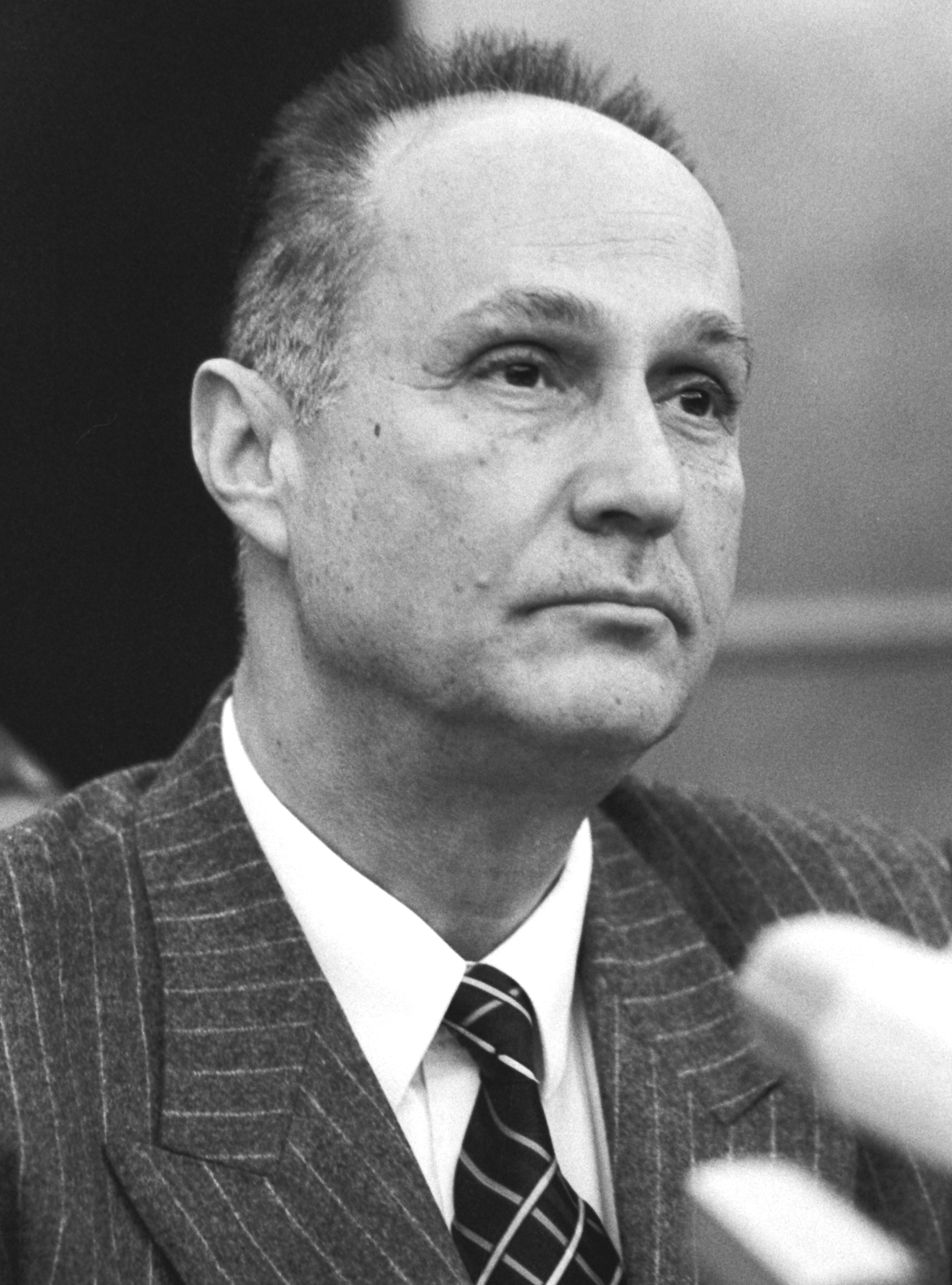

President of the Yugoslav Olympic Committee
- In office 1989–1996
- Preceded by: Ivan Mećanović
- Succeeded by: Dragan Kićanović

President of the National Assembly of Serbia
- In office 5 June 1991 – 25 January 1993
- Preceded by: Slobodan Unković
- Succeeded by: Zoran Lilić

Mayor of Belgrade
- In office 29 April 1986 – 4 December 1989
- Preceded by: Bogdan Bogdanović
- Succeeded by: Milorad Unković

Personal details
- Born: 8 November 1928 Užice, Kingdom of SCS
- Died: 13 January 2007 (aged 78) Belgrade, Serbia
- Party: Socialist Party of Serbia
- Other political affiliations: League of Communists of Yugoslavia (1948–1990)
- Spouse: Radmila Bakočević
- Education: University of Belgrade Faculty of Law

Aleksandar Bakočević (Serbian Cyrillic: Александар Бакочевић; 8 November 1928 – 13 January 2007) was a Serbian politician who served as the mayor of Belgrade from 1986 to 1989, and as the president of the National Assembly of Serbia from 1991 to 1993.

He additionally served as the President of the Yugoslav Olympic Committee from 1989 to 1996; the end of his mandate coincides with the 1996 Summer Olympics in Atlanta, United States.

Political offices
Preceded by Bogdan Bogdanović	Mayor of Belgrade; 1986–1989	Succeeded by Milorad Unković
Preceded by Slobodan Unković	President of the National Assembly of Serbia; 1991–1993	Succeeded by Zoran Lilić
Civic offices
Preceded by Ivan Mećanović	President of the Yugoslav Olympic Committee; 1989–1996	Succeeded by Dragan Kićanović
