= Mišo Broz =

Croatian diplomat

Aleksandar Mišo Broz

Ambassador of Croatia to Indonesia
- In role 2004–2009
- President: Stjepan Mesić
- Preceded by: Boris Mitrović
- Succeeded by: Željko Čimbur

Personal details
- Born: Aleksandar Broz; 21 May 1941 (age 85) Zagreb, Independent State of Croatia (now Croatia)
- Spouse: Mira Broz
- Children: Saša Broz; Andrej Broz (born 1973)
- Parents: Josip Broz Tito; Herta Haas
- Education: University of Zagreb
- Occupation: Diplomat

Aleksandar "Mišo" Broz (Serbo-Croatian Cyrillic: Александар "Мишо" Броз; born c. 21 May 1941) is a Croatian retired diplomat. He is the youngest son of Yugoslav president and Marshal Josip Broz (1892–1980) and Herta Haas (1914–2010).

== Early life ==
He was born on c. 21 May 1941 in Zagreb. He was given the name Aleksandar at birth, but during the war he was given the name Mišo, which he continued to use later.

Mišo's father, Josip Broz Tito, met Mišo's mother Herta Haas in 1937. Their relationship lasted until 1941. Just before his birth, Nazi Germany invaded his home country of Yugoslavia. His father Josip Broz Tito, the secretary general of the then illegal Communist Party of Yugoslavia (KPJ), had to move to Belgrade a few days prior to his birth. Although the rules of the illegal revolutionary life at the time dictated that an illegitimate mother hand over her newborn child to a different family for care, so as not to expose herself and the child to the risk of arrest, his mother Herta Haas refused and at first took care of her son alone. Her mother Priska and Tito's friend Vladimir Velebit helped her take care of the child.

When Herta Haas was threatened with arrest in November 1941, she gave her son Aleksandar, who was already six months old at the time, into the care of a family. He then became one of the youngest fugitives and took the illegal name Mišo. His mother was later arrested, and in 1943 she was exchanged for captured German officers and moved to the liberated territory. Until the end of the war, Mišo did not know his real parents - he saw his father for the first time in April 1945, and his mother in May of the same year.

After the liberation of Yugoslavia, Mišo lived in Belgrade, in the immediate vicinity of his father, the prime minister of Yugoslavia. Mišo, and later his older brother's children from his first marriage – Josip Joška and Zlatica, were taken care of by cousin Marija, daughter of Tito's eldest brother Martin Broz. He finished elementary school and high school in Belgrade, and then moved to Zagreb, where he graduated from the University of Zagreb.

== Career ==
After graduating from university, he worked in the economy. First, he worked at the "Prvomajska" machine tool factory, where he was the head of the export department and director of foreign trade. Later, he worked for the oil company INA, where he was the director of the import-export sector, and for the Government of the Socialist Republic of Croatia, where he was on the Committee for Foreign Relations. From 1983 to 1993, he held the highest positions in INA.

After the independence of the Republic of Croatia, in 1991, at the suggestion of then president Franjo Tuđman, he moved to the Ministry of Foreign Affairs, where he was first an advisor to the minister, and then plenipotentiary minister at the Croatian embassy in Russia and Egypt. His last duty was as ambassador to Indonesia, from 2004 to 2009.

== Personal life ==
He is married to Mira Broz, born Kosinc, and has two children - daughter Saša (b. 1969) and son Andrej (b. 1973), as well as three grandchildren - Sara, Luka, and Zita. He lives in Zagreb.

Broz has registered several trademarks related to his father.

Diplomatic posts
Preceded by Boris Mitrović	Ambassador of Croatia to Indonesia; 2004–2009	Succeeded by Željko Čimbur
