= Slobodanka Gruden =

Serbian doctor and politician (1940–2025)

Slobodanka Gruden (Serbian Cyrillic: Слободанка Груден; 2 July 1940 – 31 October 2025) was a Serbian medical doctor, academic and politician. She was the first female mayor of Belgrade, serving in the role from 1992 to 1994. During her time in office, Gruden was a member of the Socialist Party of Serbia (SPS).

== Early life and academic career ==
Gruden was born in Belgrade, in what was then the Kingdom of Yugoslavia. The years of World War II were difficult for her family; both of her parents were held in captivity during the conflict. An active member of the Red Cross from a young age, Gruden graduated from the University of Belgrade Faculty of Medicine in 1966, completed her specialization in 1976, and became primarius in 1984.

== Political career ==
Gruden joined the League of Communists of Serbia as a student and in this context became a friend of Slobodan Milošević, the future Serbian president. She served on the municipal committee of the League of Communists in Vračar and was later the president of the socio-political council in the municipality of Zemun. In 1986, she became a member of presidency of the League of Communists in Belgrade.

Serbia ceased to be a one-party socialist state in 1990, and the League of Communists transformed itself into the SPS in the same year. Gruden joined the restructured party and became a member of its main board. She was elected to the City Assembly of Belgrade for Zemun's third division in the May 1992 Serbian local elections. After the election, she was chosen as president of the assembly, a position that was at the time equivalent to mayor. She was re-elected in the December 1992 local elections and confirmed afterward for another mayoral term.

Gruden became mayor of Belgrade during the time of the Croatian War and the Bosnian War of the 1990s. Serbia was under an embargo in this period; there was a shortage of medical supplies, stores were often short of goods, and the underground economy was flourishing. As mayor, she worked to ensure the city remained functional, and she later credited the city's strong relationship with Bucharest for ensuring regular supplies of fuel. Gruden has said that one of her most important accomplishments was arranging for Serb refugee children from Croatia and Bosnia and Hercegovina to continue their education in Athens, Greece. She also returned the official Spasovdan ceremony to Belgrade after an absence of forty-five years.

Her political downfall took place after she publicly responded to criticism of her job performance by Milošević's wife Mirjana Marković. Gruden later said that she lost the support of both Milošević and Marković after persuading Vuk Drašković, the leader of the opposition Serbian Renewal Movement (SPO) party, to end a hunger strike in 1993. It became impossible for her to continue as mayor, and she resigned on 23 June 1994, receiving a round of applause from the opposition delegates in assembly.

After leaving political office, Gruden returned to working as a doctor; during the 1999 NATO bombing of Yugoslavia, she was deputy director and head of the blood transfusion service at Zemun's central clinic. Following Milošević's defeat in the 2000 Yugoslavian presidential election, she was part of a group of SPS members that called on him to resign as leader and for the party to return to its core values.

== Death ==
Gruden died on 31 October 2025, at the age of 85.
