= Sports Association of Serbia =

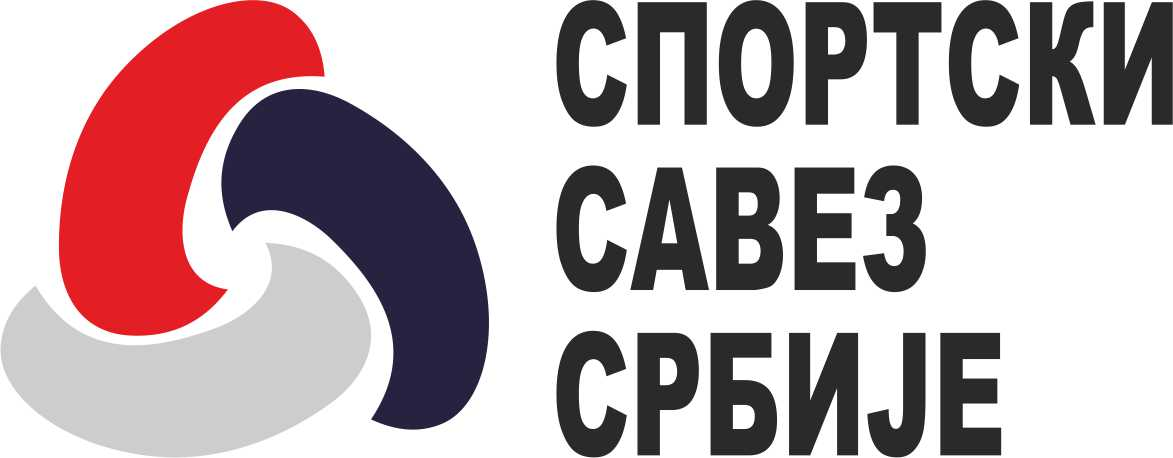
- Sport: Association of Sports
- Abbreviation: SSS
- Founded: 1945
- President: Davor Štefanek
- Secretary: Goran Marinković

Official website
- sportskisavezsrbije.rs
- (Serbia)

The Sports Association of Serbia (Serbian: Спортски савез Србије/Sportski savez Srbije, abbreviated SSS), is the National Sports Committee of Serbia. It was founded on 24 March 1946, when the Anti-fascist Assembly for the National Liberation of Serbia made a decision by which the Supreme Leadership of Fisculture left to the Initiative Sports Committee of Serbia on the entire territory of Socialist Republic of Serbia. The Sports Association of Serbia unites the various satellite sports associations in Serbia and provides a large number of sports facilities and equipment to cities over country.

The Sports Association of Serbia is in cooperation with Meridianbet in the construction of sports fields and the acquisition of sports props.
