= Herta Haas =

Slovene and Yugoslav partisan (1914–2010)

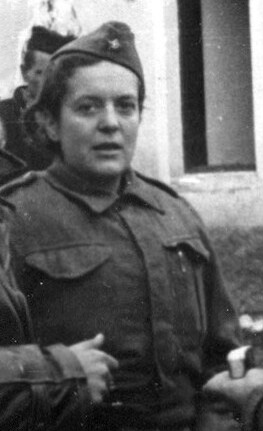
Haas in 1943

Herta Haas (29 March 1914 – 5 March 2010) was a World War II Yugoslav Partisan and the third wife of Josip Broz Tito, leader of the partisans and a future president of Yugoslavia. She was of German descent.

== Early life and family ==
Haas was born 1914 in Slovenska Bistrica, which was part of Austria-Hungary at the time. She was originally registered as Herta Gabriele Schindler and was the illegitimate daughter of Prisca Schindler (1888–1975) and the lawyer Heinrich Haas (1864–1925). After Heinrich Haas obtained a divorce from his wife, Elsa Demel Haas (1868–1951), he married Herta's mother in 1924. Her surname was legally changed to Haas in 1925.

She joined the revolutionary workers movement in high school and worked as a courier between groups in Yugoslavia and France.

== Later life ==
Haas met Tito in Paris in 1937, a year after he had divorced his first wife, Pelagija "Polka" Belousova. In 1940, Haas travelled to Istanbul to deliver a passport to Tito, who was returning from a trip to Moscow. Their relationship soon turned romantic, according to Tito's authorized biography, The Loves of Josip Broz Tito. The couple married in 1940 and returned to Yugoslavia using aliases. They lived in Zagreb until the Invasion of Yugoslavia, when Tito moved to Belgrade, while Haas, who was pregnant with their only child, remained in Zagreb.

In May 1941, Haas gave birth to their only son, Mišo Broz, who was a Croatian ambassador to Indonesia from 2004 to 2009. Partisan supporters hid Haas and her son from Nazi German authorities and their allies, but she was eventually caught and arrested. She was swapped for a German officer in a 1943 prisoner exchange between the Germans and the Partisans.

By the time Haas was released and rejoined the Partisans in 1943, Tito was having an affair with his personal secretary Davorjanka Paunović, who was code named "Zdenka". Haas and Tito suddenly separated in 1943 in Jajce during the second meeting of AVNOJ after she reportedly walked in on him and Davorjanka Paunović. Haas spent much of the rest of World War II in Slovenia, away from Tito.

Haas reportedly met Tito only once after World War II during a visit to his presidential office in Belgrade. Following the end of the war, Haas worked at several Yugoslav government institutions. She remarried and gave birth to two daughters; one of them is researcher Cvetana Krstev. She lived much of her later life in relative obscurity.

Haas died in Belgrade, Serbia, on 5 March 2010 aged 95.
